= Melody (Spanish singer) discography =

Melody discography
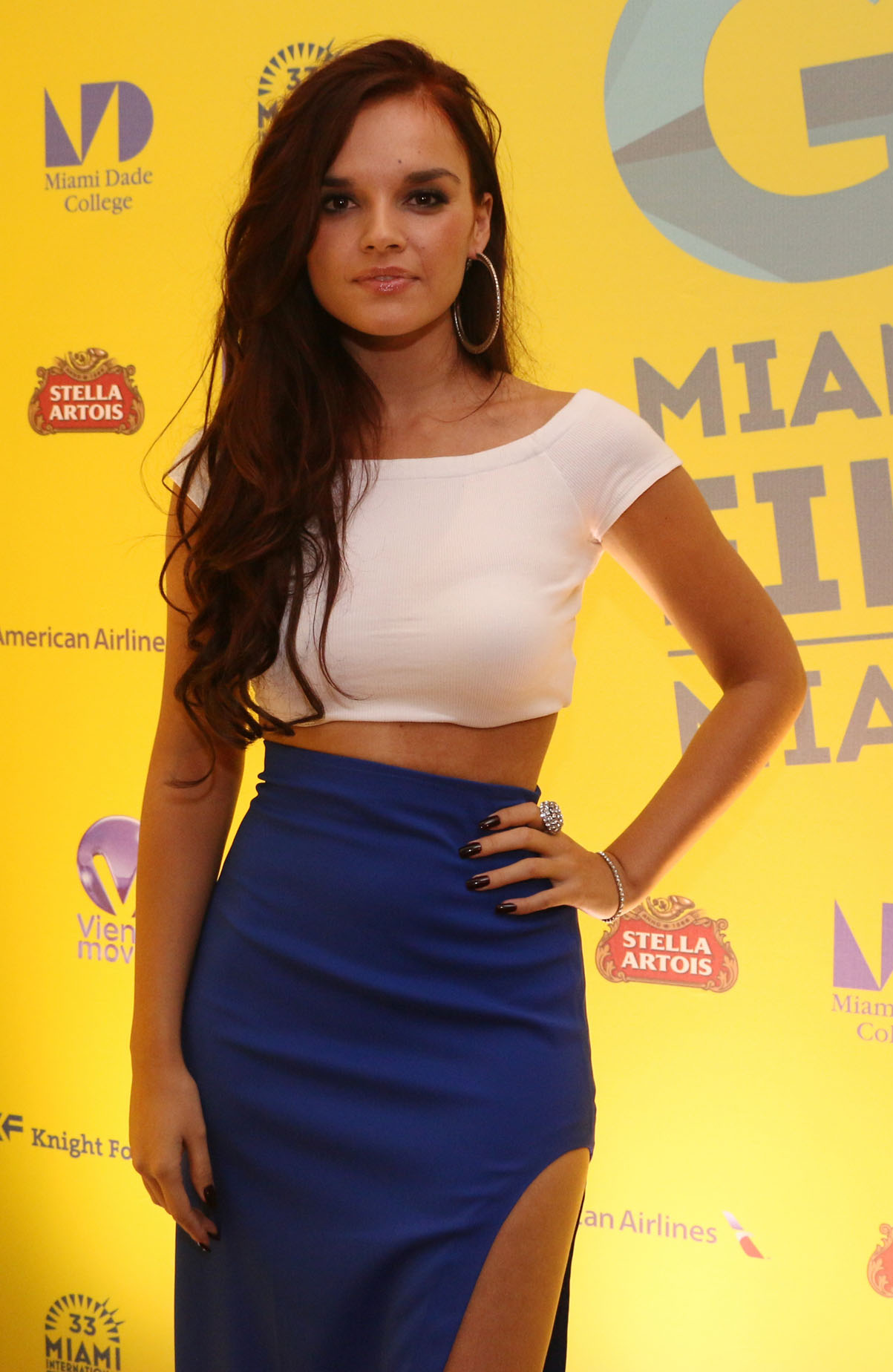
- Studio albums: 6
- Singles: 26

Spanish singer Melody has released six studio albums and about 26 singles.

== Studio albums ==
Title	Album details	Chart positions			Certifications
Title	Album details	SPA	US Latin	US Latin Pop	Certifications
De pata negra	Released: June 11, 2001; Label: Epic / Sony Music Entertainment Spain; Formats: CD, MC	2	27	12	PROMUSICAE: 2× Platinum; RIAA: Platinum (Latin)
Muévete	Released: June 9, 2002; Label: Epic / Sony Music Entertainment Spain; Formats: CD, MC	27	70	—	
T.Q.M.	Released: June 23, 2003; Label: Sony Music Entertainment Spain; Formats: CD	84	—	—	
Melodía	Released: October 18, 2004; Label: Sony Music Entertainment Spain; Formats: CD	33	—	—	
Los buenos días	Released: July 8, 2008; Label: Disparate Records; Formats: CD, download	70	—	—	
Mucho camino por andar	Released: June 9, 2014; Label: Rumba Records; Formats: CD, download	—	—	—	

== Extended plays ==
=== Promotional EPs ===
Year	Title	Album
2004	Melody	Melodía

== Singles ==
Year	Title	Peak chart positions							Certifications	Album
Year	Title	SPA	FIN	LTU	SWE Heat.	US Latin Pop	US Trop.	VEN Pop	Certifications	Album
2001	"El baile del gorila"	1	—	—	—	34	20	—	AFYVE: Platinum	De pata negra
2001	"De pata negra"	12	—	—	—	27	18	—		De pata negra
2002	"Muévete"	7	—	—	—	—	—	—		Muévete
2003	"Será"	—	—	—	—	—	—	—		T.Q.M.
2003	"Dabadabadá"	9	—	—	—	—	—	—		T.Q.M.
2003	"No sé"	—	—	—	—	—	—	—		T.Q.M.
2004	"Y ese niño"	—	—	—	—	—	—	—		Melodía
2004	"La novia es chiquita"	—	—	—	—	—	—	—		Melodía
2008	"Te digo adiós"	—	—	—	—	—	—	—		Los buenos días
2009	"Amante de la luna"	48	—	—	—	—	—	—		Non-album single
2012	"Ten cuidaíto conmigo"	—	—	—	—	—	—	—		Mucho camino por andar
2014	"Hoy me voy" (feat. DJ Pana or Ele)	—	—	—	—	—	—	—		Mucho camino por andar
2014	"Mucho camino por andar"	—	—	—	—	—	—	—		Mucho camino por andar
2015	"In My Mind"^{[A]}	—	—	—	—	—	—	—		Non-album singles
2018	"Parapapá"	—	—	—	—	—	—	18		Non-album singles
2018	"Parapapá (versión rumba)"	—	—	—	—	—	—	—		Non-album singles
2019	"Rúmbame"	—	—	—	—	—	—	—		Non-album singles
2020	"Las cosas del amor"	—	—	—	—	—	—	—		Non-album singles
2021	"Sin ley"	—	—	—	—	—	—	—		Non-album singles
2022	"Sobe son"	—	—	—	—	—	—	—		Non-album singles
2023	"Mujer loba"	—	—	—	—	—	—	—		Non-album singles
2023	"El trato"	—	—	—	—	—	—	—		Non-album singles
2024	"Y cómo es él"	—	—	—	—	—	—	—		Non-album singles
2024	"Bandido"	—	—	—	—	—	—	—		Non-album singles
2024	"Esa diva"	2	47	53	5	—	—	—	PROMUSICAE: Platinum	Non-album singles
2025	"El Apagón"	—	—	—	—	—	—	—		Non-album singles
2026	"Alarma"	—	—	—	—	—	—	—		Non-album singles
2026	"Ilarie"	—	—	—	—	—	—	—		Non-album singles
2026	"El Huracán"	—	—	—	—	—	—	—		Non-album singles

^{[A]} from the 2015 Spanish film It's Now or Never

=== Remix singles ===
Year	Title
2001	El baile del gorila Remixes
2001	El baile del gorila ¡Uh, Uh Mixes!
2001	De pata negra Remixes
2002	Gorila Dance Remixes 2002
2002	Muévete Remixes

For chart positions, see "Singles".

=== Promotional singles ===
Year	Title	Album
2001	"Papi ¿Que me pasa a mi?"	De pata negra
2001	"La ratita"	De pata negra
2001	"Besos de cristal"	De pata negra
2001	"La cuerda de su guitarra"	De pata negra
2002	"Cuidado con el toro"	Muévete
2002	"Lo mío es la música"	Muévete

=== Collaboration singles ===
Year	Title
2013	"No sé (Remix)" (DJ Pana feat. Melody)
2015	"Do You Know" / "Tú lo sabes" (Melek 2)
2019	"Mátame" (Descemer Bueno feat. Melody & El Micha)
2021	"No sé (Remix)" (Explosión de Iquitos feat. Melody)

== Music videos ==
Title	Year	Director(s)	Ref.
Muévete	2002		
"Hoy me voy" (Melody ft. Ele)	2018		
"Mátame" (Descemer Bueno feat. Melody & El Micha)	2019	Descemer Bueno and Pedro Vázquez	
Esa diva	2025	Mario Ruiz	
