= Spain in the Eurovision Song Contest 2025 =

- Eurovision Song Contest 2025
- Participating broadcaster: Radiotelevisión Española (RTVE)
- Country: Spain
- Selection process: Benidorm Fest 2025
- Selection date: 1 February 2025

Competing entry
- Song: "Esa diva"
- Artist: Melody
- Songwriters: Alberto Fuentes Lorite; Melodía Ruiz Gutiérrez

Placement
- Final result: 24th, 37 points

Participation chronology

Spain was represented at the Eurovision Song Contest 2025 with the song "Esa diva", written by Alberto Fuentes Lorite and Melodía Ruiz Gutiérrez, and performed by Ruiz herself under her stage name Melody. The Spanish participating broadcaster, Radiotelevisión Española (RTVE), together with the Generalitat Valenciana, organised Benidorm Fest 2025 in order to select its entry for the contest. Melody had attempted to represent Spain in 2009 with "Amante de la luna" but came second in the national final in a tie in points with the winner.

As a member of the "Big Five", Spain was directly qualified to compete in the final of the contest. Performing in position 6, it placed 24th out of 26 competing entries with 37 points.

== Background ==
Prior to the 2025 contest, Televisión Española (TVE) until 2006, and Radiotelevisión Española (RTVE) since 2007, had participated in the Eurovision Song Contest representing Spain sixty-three times since TVE's first entry in 1961. They have won the contest on two occasions: in 1968 with the song "La, la, la" performed by Massiel and in 1969 with the song "Vivo cantando" performed by Salomé, the latter having won in a four-way tie with France, the Netherlands, and the United Kingdom. They have also finished second four times, with "En un mundo nuevo" by Karina in 1971, "Eres tú" by Mocedades in 1973, "Su canción" by Betty Missiego in 1979, and "Vuelve conmigo" by Anabel Conde in 1995, and third two times, with "Lady, Lady" by Bravo in 1984 and "SloMo" by Chanel in 2022. In 2024, RTVE placed 22nd with the song "Zorra" performed by Nebulossa.

As part of its duties as participating broadcaster, RTVE organises the selection of its entry in the Eurovision Song Contest and broadcasts the event in the country. The broadcaster has selected its entry for the contest through both national finals and internal selections in the past, with the national final Benidorm Fest being used since 2022. RTVE confirmed its intentions to participate at the 2025 contest on 1 February 2024, while Benidorm Fest 2024 was still ongoing, announcing the organisation of the fourth edition of the festival in order to select its next entry.

== Before Eurovision ==
=== Benidorm Fest 2025 ===
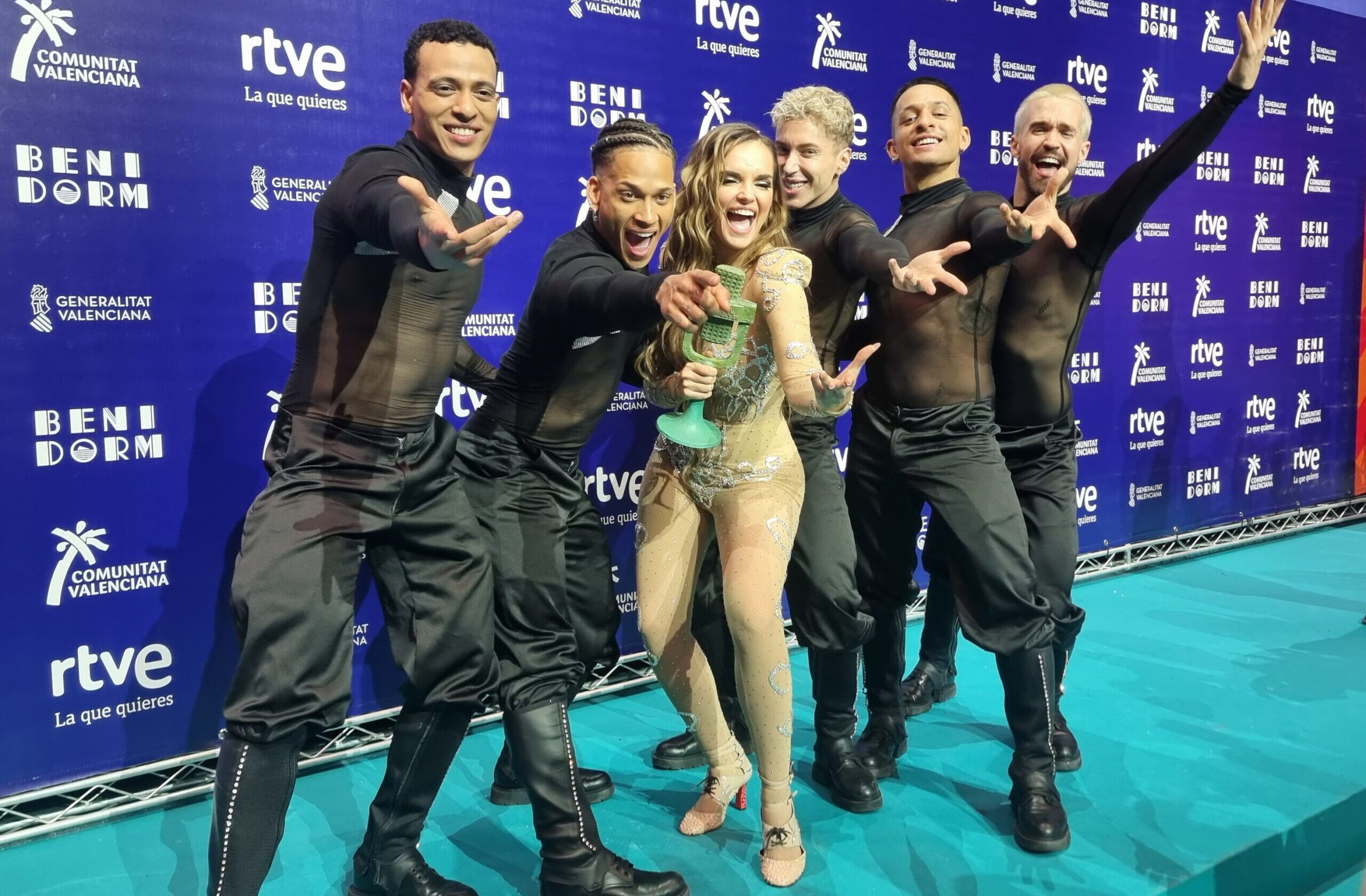
Melody and her dancers (Bolivar, Arango, Busarov, Urquiaga, and Montojo) after winning Benidorm Fest.

Benidorm Fest 2025 was the fourth edition of Benidorm Fest, organised by RTVE and Generalitat Valenciana to select the Spanish entry for the Eurovision Song Contest 2025. The event took place at the Palau Municipal d'Esports l'Illa de Benidorm in Benidorm, Valencian Community. Sixteen artists and songs competed over three shows: two semi-finals on 28 and 30 January, and the final on 1 February 2025, with a total of eight entries ultimately qualifying to the final.

The voting consisted of a national and international jury vote (50%) and public voting (50%), the latter of which was a combination of telephone calls, SMS messages and votes cast through a free mobile app.

==== Semi-finals ====
- The first semi-final took place on 28 January 2025. "Uh nana" performed by Daniela Blasco, "Hartita de llorar" performed by Lachispa, "Loca xti" performed by Kuve and "Te escribo en el cielo" performed by Lucas Bun advanced to the final, while "Mala feminista" performed by Chica Sobresalto, "Amor barato" performed by David Afonso, "Reinas" performed by Sonia & Selena and "Me gustas tú" performed by K!ngdom were eliminated.
- The second semi-final took place on 30 January 2025. "I'm a Queen" performed by Mel Ömana, "Esa diva" performed by Melody, "VIP" performed by J Kbello and "Raggio di sole" performed by Mawot advanced to the final, while "Bésame" performed by Carla Frigo, "La pena" performed by DeTeresa, "No lo ves" performed by Henry Semler and "La casa" performed by Celine Van Heel were eliminated.

==== Final ====
The final took place on 1 February 2025 and saw eight contestants, four having qualified from each semi-final. The winning entry was "Esa diva" performed by Melody. The song was written by Melody herself along Alberto Fuentes Lorite, and was arranged by Joy Deb, Peter Boström, and Thomas G:son. She was accompanied by five backing male dancers: Daniel Arango, Jesús Bolivar, Hrisio Busarov, Marc Montojo, and Iván Matías Urquiaga.

Final – 1 February 2025
R/O	Artist	Song	Expert jury	Public vote	Total	Place
1	Daniela Blasco	"Uh nana"	71	70	141	2
2	Kuve	"Loca xti"	52	44	96	6
3	Mawot	"Raggio di sole"	18	40	58	8
4	Lachispa	"Hartita de llorar"	48	50	98	5
5	Mel Ömana	"I'm a Queen"	61	56	117	4
6	J Kbello	"VIP"	74	60	134	3
7	Lucas Bun	"Te escribo en el cielo"	38	32	70	7
8	Melody	"Esa diva"	70	80	150	1

=== Preparations ===
For the Eurovision performance, RTVE appointed Mario Ruiz as its artistic director, Mónica Peña and Alex Bullón as choreographers, Maxi Gilbert as lighting designer, Mercè Llorens as camera director and supervisor, and Raúl Amor as stylist. The backing dance group was changed to three male and two female dancers, keeping Marc Montojo and Iván Matías Urquiaga from Benidorm Fest, and incorporating Ana Acosta, Vicky Gómez, and the choreographer Álex Bullón himself. The stage outfits for Eurovision were designed and tailored by Gustavo Adolfo Tarí.

A revamped version of "Esa diva", produced by Eighty4, Rick Parkhouse, George Tizzard, and Guillem Vila Borràs, was released on 13 March 2025, alongside an accompanying music video directed by Mario Ruiz. RTVE premiered the video in simulcast on all of its channels, attracting 2.343 million viewers and a 17% share in average. (Note: RTVE premiered the new version and the music video simultaneously on Televisión Española (TVE) on La 1, La 2, 24 horas, Clan, and Teledeporte, on Radio Nacional de España (RNE), and online on RTVE Play, on 13 March 2025 at 21:40 CET, presented as "The Diva Xperience".) The video had previously been presented at a private screening for the press on 11 March at the Sala Equis in Madrid.

=== Promotion ===
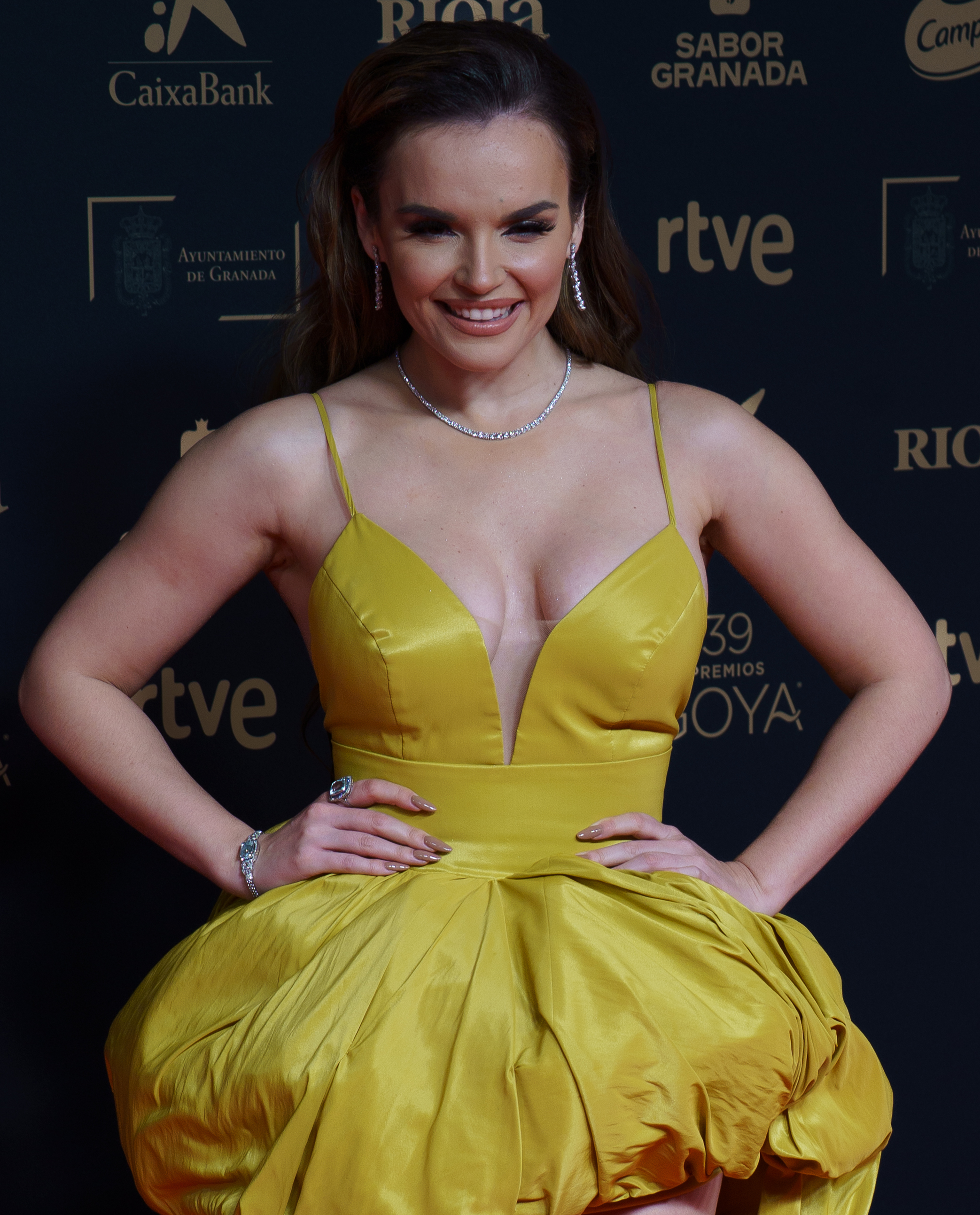
Melody on the red carpet at the 39th Goya Awards.

On 3 February 2025, Melody made her first television appearance after winning Benidorm Fest on the talk show La revuelta, attracting 1.951 million viewers and a 14.77% share in average on La 1 during her interview. On 8 February, she attended the 39th Goya Awards ceremony in Granada, in which all the journalists who were taking turns interviewing her on the red carpet ended up asking her to sing a piece of "Esa diva", which caused her voice to sneak into all the other interviews that were being done at the same time over and over again. On 21 February, the Mayor of Seville, José Luis Sanz, received her at the city hall where she greeted and sang "Esa diva" from the main balcony to a large cheering crowd in Plaza Nueva.

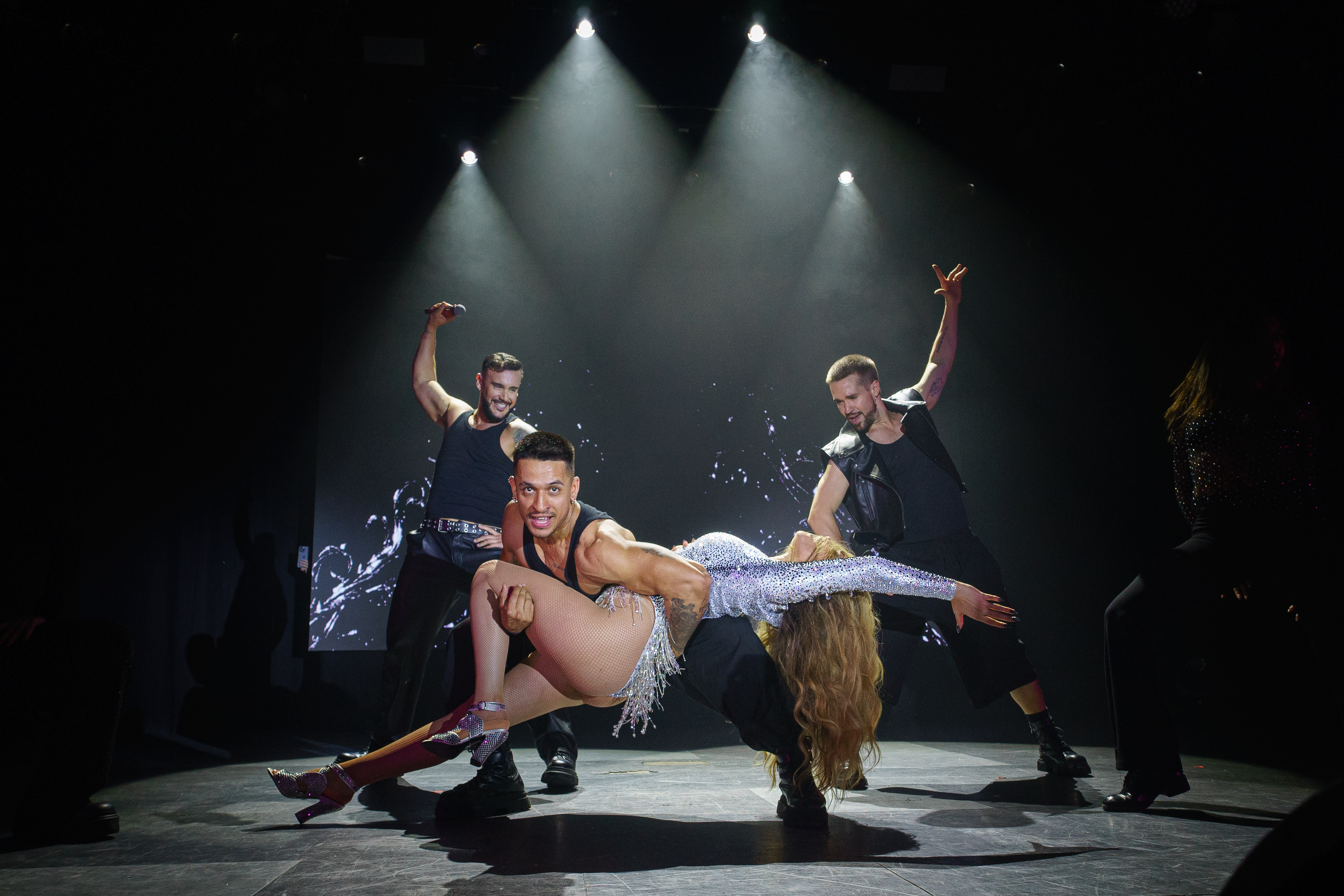
Melody and her dancers (Bullón, Urquiaga, and Montojo) performing "Esa diva" at the PrePartyES.

Melody participated in Eurovision: A Little Bit More with a symphonic version of "Esa diva", arranged and orchestrated by Borja Arias, and performed along with the RTVE Symphony Orchestra and Choir conducted by Raúl Benavent at the Teatro Monumental in Madrid, which was released on 1 April 2025; and a cover of "Vuelve conmigo", the song which placed second at the Eurovision Song Contest 1995 performed by Anabel Conde, which was released on 17 April. She also attended and performed the revamp version of "Esa diva" at the Eurovision in Concert event in Amsterdam on 5 April, the Eurovision Party in London on 13 April, and the PrePartyES in Madrid on 18–19 April. (Note: In addition to the revamp version of "Esa diva", Melody performed at the PrePartyES an acoustic version of the song, "Vuelve conmigo" in a duo with Anabel Conde, and "Amante de la luna", the song with which she attempted to represent Spain in 2009, but which came second in the national final in a tie in points with the winner.)

On 7 April 2025, Melody was received at the town hall of her hometown of Dos Hermanas (Seville), where she sang "Esa diva" from the balcony to the crowd. On 23 April, she surprised the children's cast of the Spanish stage musical adaptation of The Chorus on stage, and everyone present, after their performance at Teatro La Latina in Madrid, since they had made a video singing "Esa diva". She thanked them for the gesture, encouraged them to sing the song for everyone there, after which she also sang the chorus with them. On 25 April, ¡Hola! magazine, in partnership with RTVE, published for the first time a special 144-pages Eurovision collector's book for fans.

On 26 April 2025, on the occasion of the final match of the 2024–25 Copa del Rey football tournament at the Estadio de La Cartuja in Seville, RTVE, which was broadcasting the event, interviewed Melody on the field during halftime and broadcast the "Esa diva" music video in which the first verse had been replaced with some footage, recorded the day before, of her singing it a cappella next to the Cup in the center of the empty stadium. This was watched on La 1 by 5.9 million people with a share of 40.13% in average. RTVE had tried to get her to perform the song live during halftime at the stadium, but the Football Federation consider it inappropriate. On 28 April, on her journey back to Madrid, Melody was one of those who were stuck on trains due to a major blackout that affected all of the Iberian Peninsula; she stayed for more than seven hours on a high-speed train stopped in the province of Ciudad Real before being evacuated.

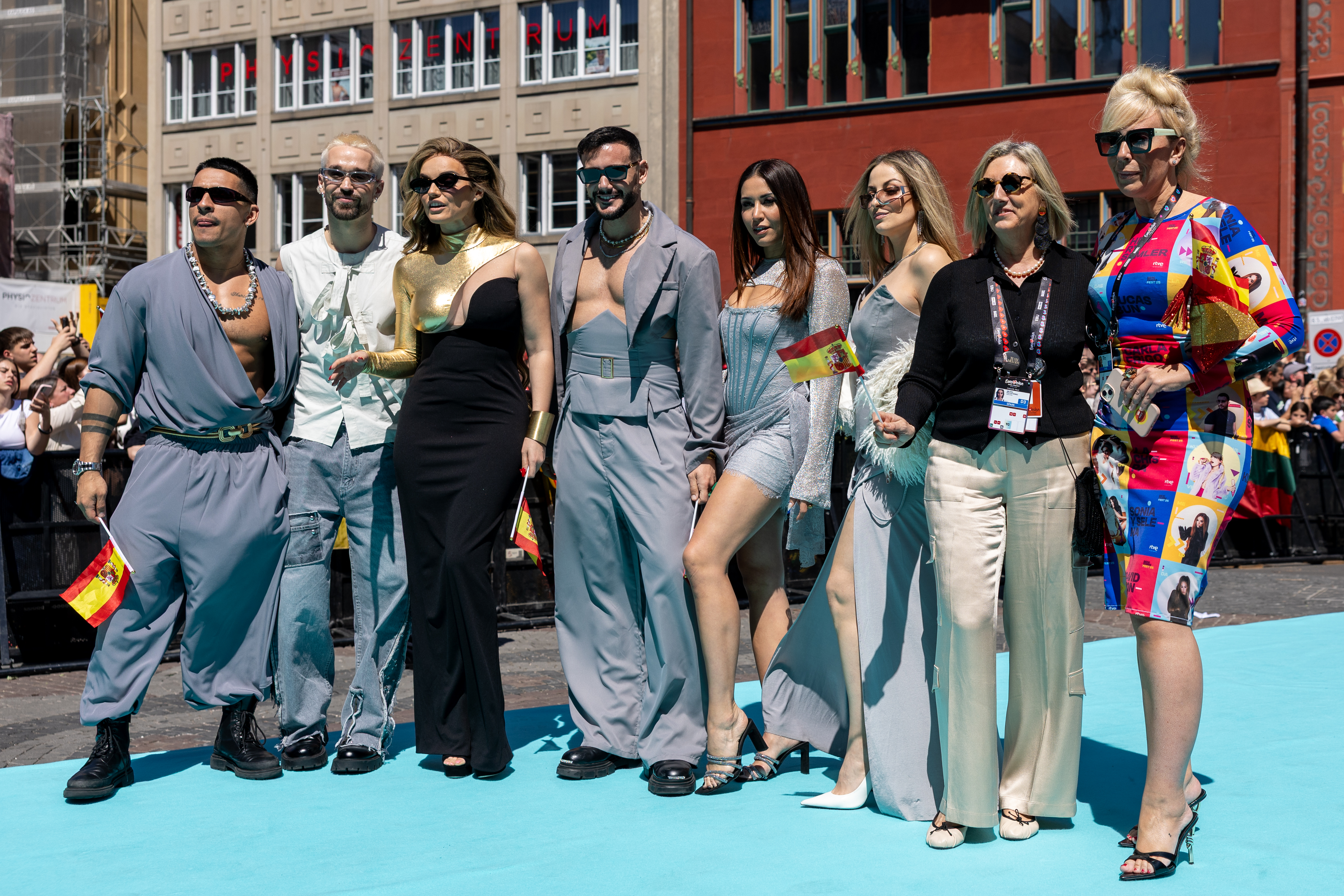
The Spanish delegation on the "Turquoise Carpet" in Basel. (Note: Left to right: Iván Matías Urquiaga, Marc Montojo, Melody, Álex Bullón, Ana Acosta, Vicky Gómez, Ana María Bordas –Head of Delegation of RTVE–, and María Eizaguirre –Director of Communication and Participation of RTVE–.)

On 5 May 2025, the Prime Minister of Spain, Pedro Sánchez, received Melody at the Palace of Moncloa. She guest appeared in the fifth episode of the thirteenth season of MasterChef on 5 May on La 1. On 6 May, RTVE held a gala at Teatro Barceló in Madrid to both present its spring programming and bid farewell to Melody before departing with the entire delegation for Basel the following day. At the event, which was broadcast on RTVE Play, she received the gold record certifications for "Esa diva". (Note: The event had to be postponed twice due to the death of Pope Francis and the blackout.) On 11 May, Melody and her team attended the opening ceremony of the Eurovision Song Contest 2025 and its "Turquoise Carpet" in Basel, where she wore a black and gold dress designed by Rafael Urquizar.

=== Calls for exclusion of Israel ===
On 11 April 2025, RTVE requested a debate within the European Broadcasting Union (EBU) regarding participation of the Israeli Public Broadcasting Corporation (IPBC/Kan) in the contest representing Israel, citing "concerns raised by various civil society groups in Spain regarding the situation in Gaza". That same day, the EBU responded to RTVE's letter, acknowledging "concerns and deeply held views around the current conflict in the Middle East" but reiterating that all EBU members are eligible to compete.

== At Eurovision ==
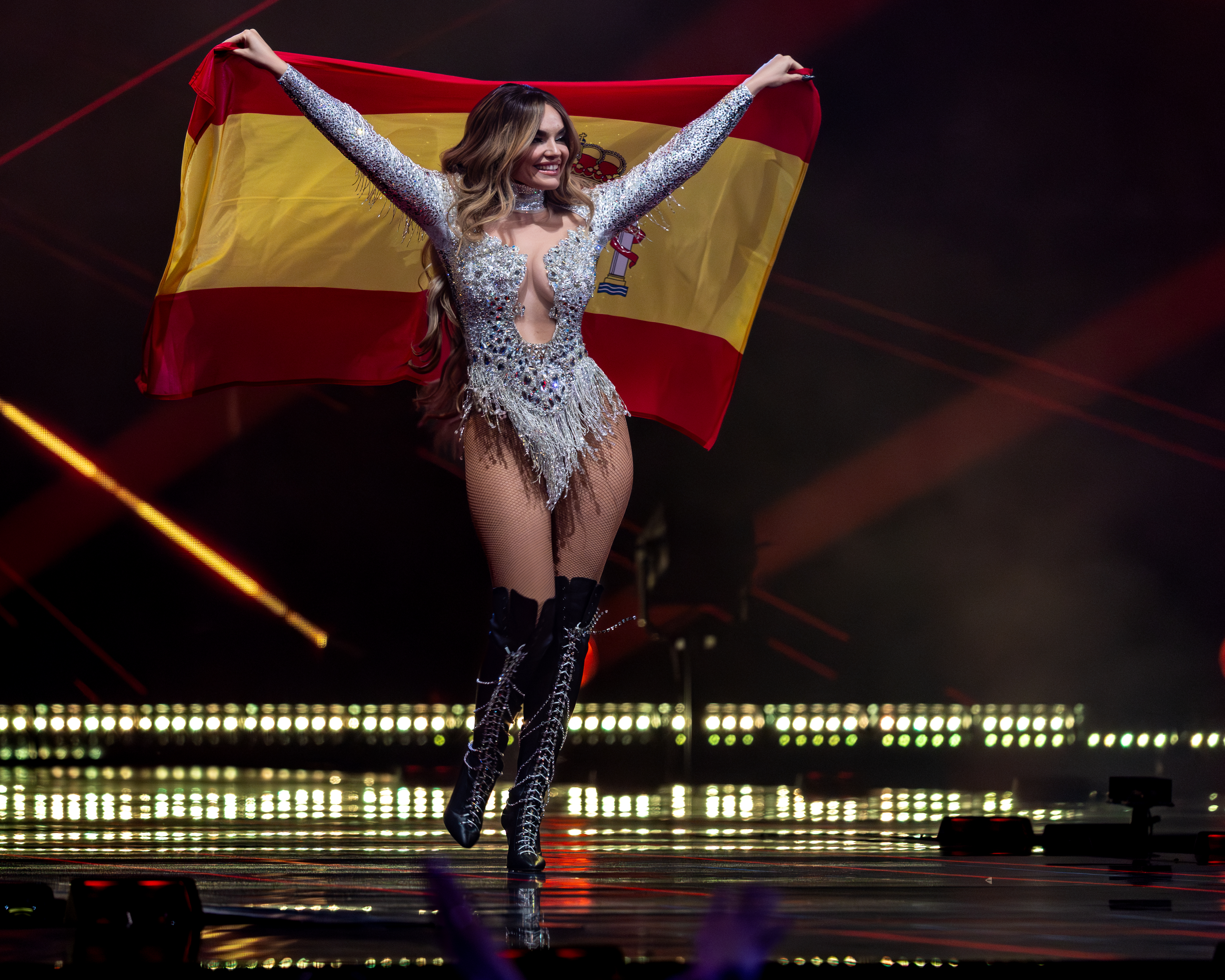
Melody during the flag parade at the Eurovision grand final.

The Eurovision Song Contest 2025 took place at St. Jakobshalle in Basel, Switzerland, and consisted of two semi-finals, held on 13 and 15 May respectively, and the final on 17 May 2025. All countries with the exceptions of the host country (Switzerland) and the "Big Five" (France, Germany, Italy, Spain, and the United Kingdom) were required to qualify from one of two semi-finals in order to compete in the final; the top ten entries from each semi-final progressed to the final. As a member of the "Big Five", Spain was automatically qualified to the final, but it was required to broadcast the first semi-final, and guest perform and vote in it. In that first semi-final, Melody guest performed "Esa diva" between the entries competing in positions 4 and 5. In the final, she performed in position 6, and placed twenty-fourth out of the twenty-six competing entries with 37 points.

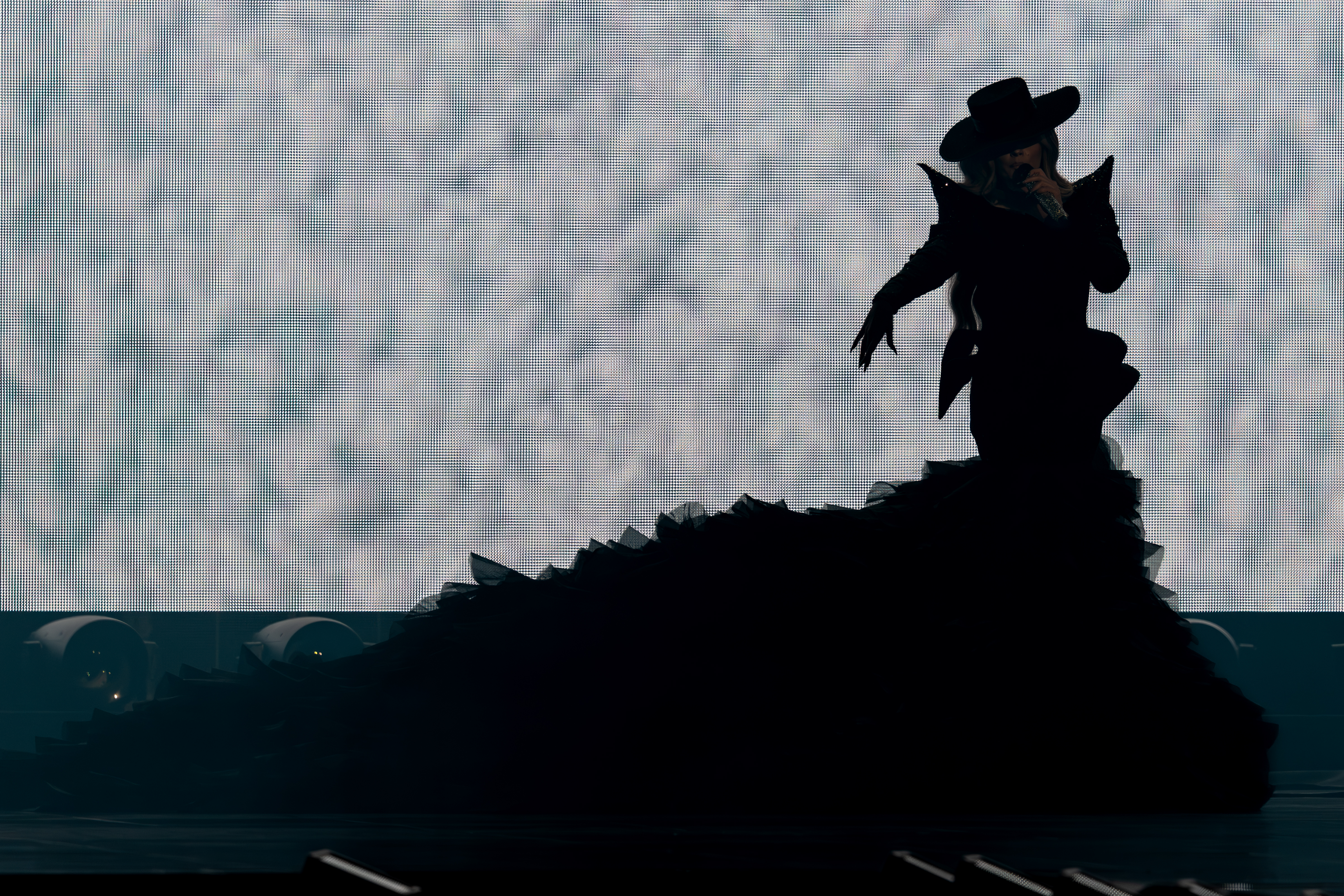
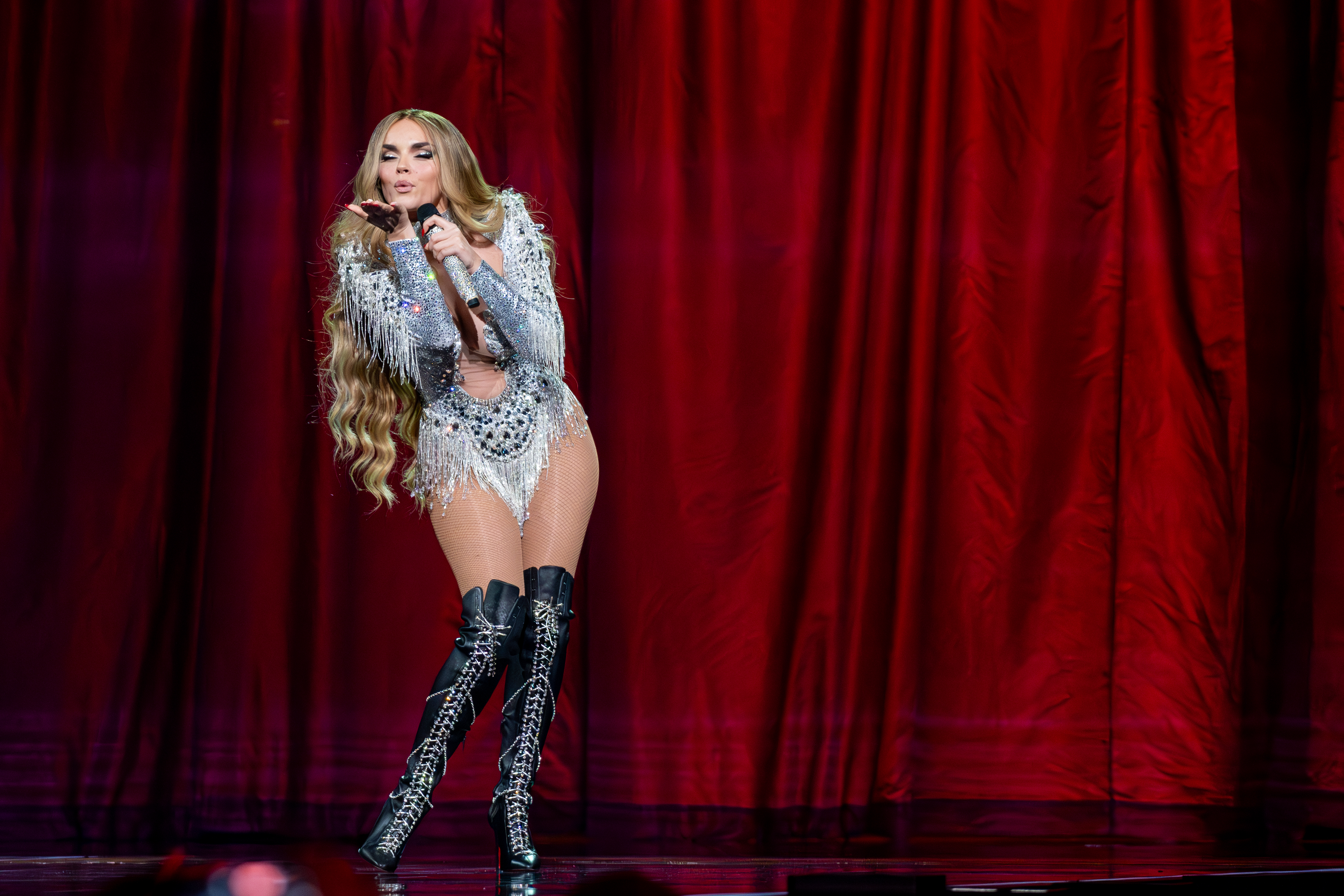
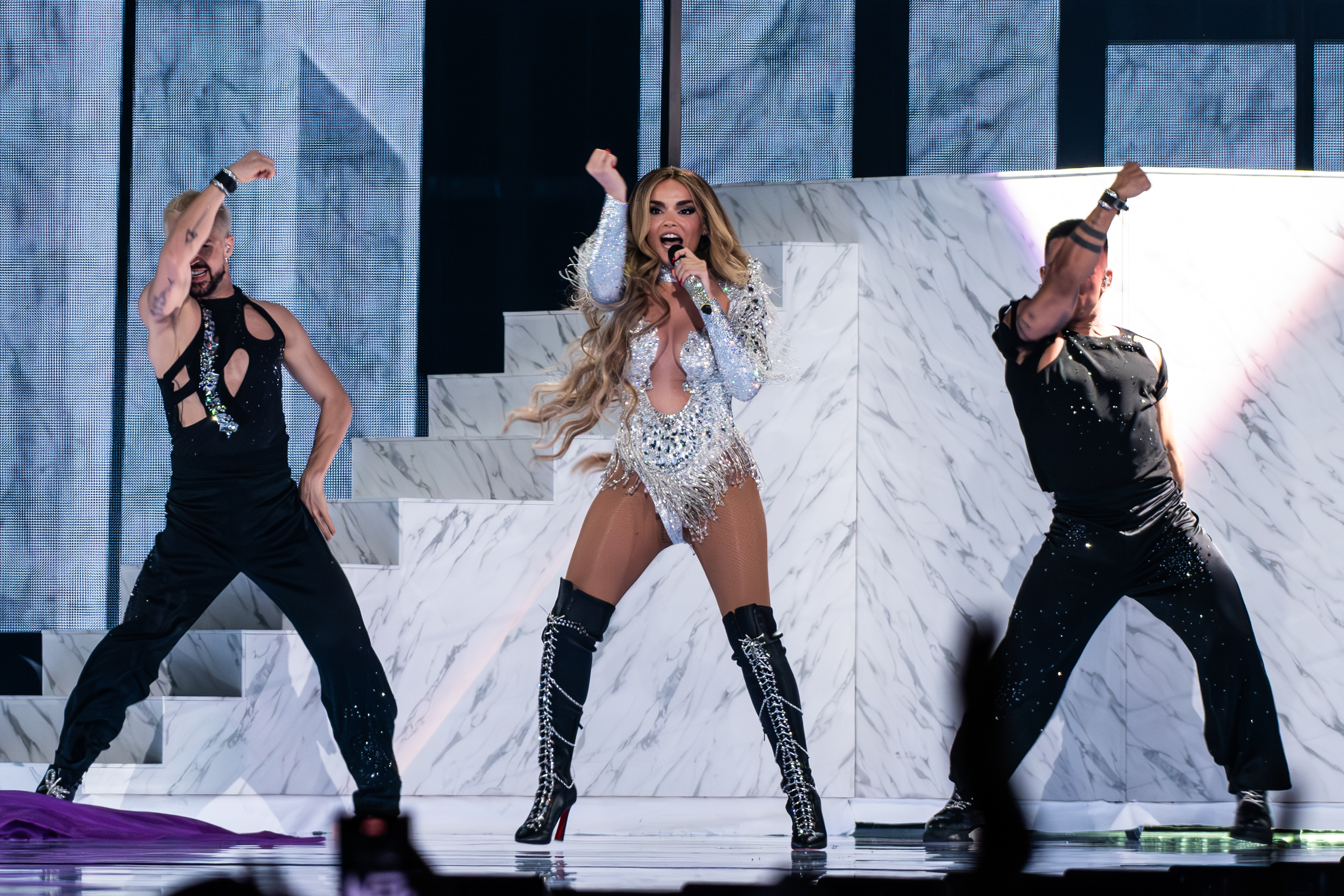
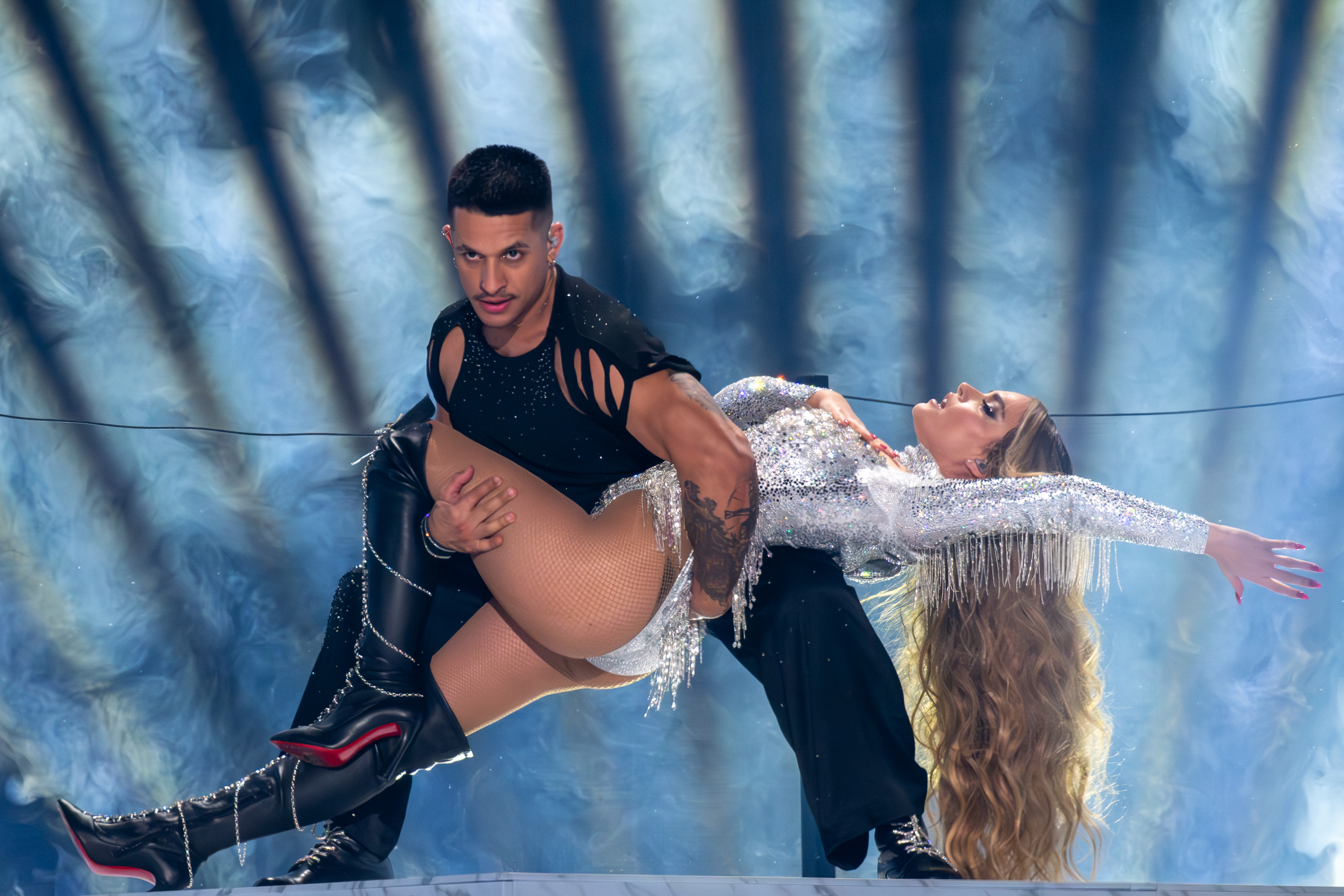
Melody performing "Esa diva" at the Eurovision stage.

The performance of "Esa diva" at the Eurovision stage was preceded by a presentation video postcard filmed in Lucerne in February where Melody makes some chocolates. The live performance of the song begins with Melody backlit against a white background wearing a Cordovan hat and a long-tailed black dress from which her dancers emerge. As she steps off the small platform she is standing on, a red carpet unfolds on the floor screen and flashes of light illuminate her. As the first chorus hits, she appears from behind a large curtain wearing a shiny, silver bodysuit. She walks to the center of the stage and blows a kiss to the camera. As the second chorus hits, the curtain falls revealing a white structure with two staircases. After a dance break, she goes upstairs to sing a long note and the final chorus, ending the performance with a final pirouette.

In Spain, TVE broadcast the first semi-final and the final of the contest on La 1 and its 4K UHD simulcast channel La 1 UHD, and the second semi-final on La 2; in addition, Radio Nacional de España (RNE) aired the final on Radio Nacional and on its accessible service RNE para todos; with all the shows also broadcast internationally on TVE Internacional and the final on Radio Exterior; and both television and radio broadcasts available online via RTVE Play. Julia Varela and Tony Aguilar provided the commentary for the television broadcast, and David Asensio, Sara Calvo, and Luis Miguel Montes commented the final on the radio broadcast. The final was broadcast in Catalonia on Ràdio 4 with commentary in Catalan by Sònia Urbano and Xavi Martínez, with the option of the Catalan commentary also available regionally on La 1. As part of the Eurovision programming, the special live broadcast Divas Calling, hosted by Ángela Fernández, Carmen Farala, and Angy Fernández, preceded each of the three shows and followed the final on RTVE Play, with the edition for the final held at the Auditorio Los del Río in Dos Hermanas, and with the after-final also broadcast on La 1. On Friday 16 May, the documentary Melodiva about Melody's journey to Eurovision premiered on La 1 and RTVE Play. The long-running daily game show Saber y ganar paused its regular run during Eurovision week to hold five special themed episodes about the event on La 2 and RTVE Play. A special themed episode of La familia de la tele titled La familia de la tele a Eurovisión, hosted by María Patiño and Aitor Albizua live from Prado del Rey, preceded the final on La 1.

RTVE appointed Chanel Terrero, who represented Spain in 2022, as its spokesperson to announce the Spanish jury's votes in the final live from Benidorm. Public events, organised by RTVE in collaboration with the town council, were held on 16–17 May at the Auditorio Julio Iglesias in Benidorm with performances by special guests, the live screening of the final, and other activities. They also held a public event on 14 May at the Gare du Nord in Basel.

The first semi-final, in where Spain guest performed and voted, attracted 1.348 million viewers and a 11% share on La 1 in average, being the most watched Eurovision semi-final to date. Melody's performance was watched by 1.586 million people with a share of 13.23% in average. The second semi-final attracted 0.804 million viewers and a 6.5% share on La 2 in average. The final attracted 5.884 million viewers and a 50.1% share on La 1 in average, with the voting segment followed by 6.315 million viewers and a 59.7% share in average. The final was watched on RTVE Play by 0.839 million viewers in average.

=== Commentary controversy ===
During the broadcast of the second semi-final, commentators Julia Varela and Tony Aguilar introduced the Israeli entry with a mention to the casualties of the Gaza war. (Note: RTVE confirmed that its commentators made this introduction "in coordination with the network".) Following a complaint filed by the Israeli broadcaster Kan, the EBU threatened RTVE with "punitive fines" if its commentators mention the war again in the final. (Note: In a letter sent to RTVE signed by Bakel Walden –the chairperson of the contest's reference group– and Martin Osterdahl –the contest's executive supervisor–.) The news boards of TVE and rtve.es expressed their "concern over the threat", defended Varela and Aguilar's right to comment freely, and condemned any interference. Just before the final, RTVE aired a message on-screen in Spanish and English which read, "When human rights are at stake, silence is not an option. Peace and justice for Palestine". In the final, Varela and Aguilar simply introduced the singer and the song briefly during the Israeli postcard. Following the publication of the detailed televoting results, RTVE announced it would ask the EBU to open a debate on the televoting system to assess whether the way it is being carried out is the best, as it believes it is affected by ongoing armed conflicts; the Spanish televote had awarded its 12 points to Israel in the final.

=== Voting ===
Below is a breakdown of points awarded to Spain in the final and by Spain in the first semi-final and in the final. Voting during the three shows involved each country awarding sets of points from 1–8, 10, and 12: one from their professional jury and the other from televoting in the final vote, while the semi-final vote was based entirely on the vote of the public. In the final, Spain placed 24th with 37 points. Over the course of the contest, Spain awarded its 12 points to Ukraine in the first semi-final, and to Switzerland (jury) and Israel (televote) in the final.

==== Points awarded to Spain ====
Points awarded to Spain (Final)
Score	Televote	Jury
12 points		
10 points		Albania
8 points		
7 points		
6 points	Portugal	
5 points		Azerbaijan; France; Malta
4 points		
3 points	Rest of the World	
2 points		Sweden
1 point	Ireland	

==== Points awarded by Spain ====
Points awarded by Spain (Semi-final 1)
Score	Televote
12 points	Ukraine
10 points	Poland
8 points	Norway
7 points	Portugal
6 points	Albania
5 points	Iceland
4 points	Estonia
3 points	Netherlands
2 points	Sweden
1 point	San Marino

Points awarded by Spain (Final)
Score	Televote	Jury
12 points	Israel	Switzerland
10 points	Ukraine	Netherlands
8 points	Poland	France
7 points	Estonia	Austria
6 points	Finland	United Kingdom
5 points	Sweden	Malta
4 points	Austria	Italy
3 points	Albania	Germany
2 points	Norway	Ukraine
1 point	France	Albania

==== Detailed voting results ====
Each participating broadcaster assembles a five-member jury panel consisting of music industry professionals who are citizens of the country they represent. Each jury, and individual jury member, is required to meet a strict set of criteria regarding professional background, as well as diversity in gender and age. No member of a national jury was permitted to be related in any way to any of the competing acts in such a way that they cannot vote impartially and independently. The individual rankings of each jury member as well as the country's televoting results were released shortly after the grand final.

The following members comprised the Spanish jury:

- Javier Llano Abril – director of Cadena 100
- Javier Pageo Nicolás – stage designer
- Anabel Conde – singer, represented Spain in 1995
- Irene Garrido Miñano – singer
- María Melodía Pérez Castillo (Mel Ömana) – singer, finalist of the Benidorm Fest 2025

Detailed voting results from Spain (Semi-final 1)
R/O	Country	Televote	
R/O	Country	Rank	Points
01	Iceland	6	5
02	Poland	2	10
03	Slovenia	13	
04	Estonia	7	4
05	Ukraine	1	12
06	Sweden	9	2
07	Portugal	4	7
08	Norway	3	8
09	Belgium	11	
10	Azerbaijan	15	
11	San Marino	10	1
12	Albania	5	6
13	Netherlands	8	3
14	Croatia	14	
15	Cyprus	12	

Detailed voting results from Spain (Final)
R/O	Country	Jury							Televote		
R/O	Country	Juror A	Juror B	Juror C	Juror D	Juror E	Rank	Points	Percentage	Rank	Points
01	Norway	20	22	10	14	17	21		3.31%	9	2
02	Luxembourg	15	7	20	9	8	13		1.32%	25	
03	Estonia	23	13	24	15	24	24		4.37%	4	7
04	Israel	25	6	22	24	20	18		33.34%	1	12
05	Lithuania	4	20	23	16	18	15		1.71%	19	
06	Spain										
07	Ukraine	9	21	18	2	7	9	2	6.74%	2	10
08	United Kingdom	19	3	8	13	2	5	6	1.34%	24	
09	Austria	11	5	6	3	4	4	7	3.47%	7	4
10	Iceland	22	9	19	23	23	22		2.16%	17	
11	Latvia	7	19	16	20	5	12		1.41%	22	
12	Netherlands	3	1	3	7	9	2	10	2.56%	12	
13	Finland	14	25	7	22	11	17		3.90%	5	6
14	Italy	6	11	13	11	3	7	4	2.83%	11	
15	Poland	18	14	14	5	19	14		5.66%	3	8
16	Germany	12	10	4	10	6	8	3	2.42%	14	
17	Greece	21	23	15	8	21	20		2.29%	15	
18	Armenia	10	24	11	19	16	19		2.44%	13	
19	Switzerland	1	4	2	18	1	1	12	1.40%	23	
20	Malta	13	12	5	1	15	6	5	1.78%	18	
21	Portugal	17	15	21	21	13	23		2.26%	16	
22	Denmark	16	17	12	6	22	16		1.66%	20	
23	Sweden	2	8	17	12	14	11		3.87%	6	5
24	France	8	2	1	17	10	3	8	2.88%	10	1
25	San Marino	24	16	25	25	25	25		1.55%	21	
26	Albania	5	18	9	4	12	10	1	3.36%	8	3

== After Eurovision ==
Just after Eurovision, RTVE and Melody canceled their upcoming events so she could have a few days to rest. These included a joint press conference and an interview on La revuelta, both scheduled for 19 May 2025, which sparked speculation in the Spanish media. On 26 May, RTVE held a press conference at Prado del Rey where they discussed Melody's participation, expressed their gratitude for the support they had received; Melody expressed her disagreement with RTVE over some of the decisions made. The press conference was broadcast on RTVE Play, streamed on numerous digital media outlets, and covered live not only on La familia de la tele on La 1, but also on rival television shows in the other Spanish major networks.

Following a disagreement between Melody and the La revuelta team over the way they reacted to her absence, she refused to appear on the show. On 4 June, she made her first television appearance after Eurovision instead on the rival talk show El Hormiguero on Antena 3, attracting 2.443 million viewers and a 19.9% share in average. She opened the show with a live medley of "Esa diva" and her new single "El apagón", marking the first time in the show's history that a guest began the program by performing, after which she was interviewed. As a result of this, RTVE added a clause to the rules of Benidorm Fest 2026, which were published on 4 June, extending to two months after Eurovision its decision-making power over which interviews its future representative will give. Media immediately dubbed this clause the "Melody Clause".

Due to the Gaza war which has brought Israel's participation in the contest into controversy, on 4 December 2025, RTVE announced it would not compete in or broadcast the 2026 contest after Israel was permitted to compete. This marks the first time Spain has not participated in the contest since its 1961 debut.
