= La casa de los gemelos =

- Also known as: La cárcel de los gemelos
- Genre: Reality game show
- Created by: Daniel and Carlos Ramos
- Presented by: Daniel and Carlos Ramos; Kiko Hernández (2-)
- Country of origin: Spain
- No. of seasons: 2 (+1 TBA)
- No. of episodes: 26 (+21 TBA)

Original release
- Release: 12 October 2025 – present

La casa de los gemelos ("The twins' house") is a Spanish reality game show produced by brothers Carlos and Daniel Ramos, known on YouTube as Zona Gemelos. The show premiered on 12 October 2025 and was halted by producers a day later, with incidents between housemates forcing the Ramos brothers to shut down production of the first series quickly. The show was occasionally analysed on sections of Ten's chat show No somos nadie, hosted by María Patiño.

The show brings together a group of TikTok content creators to live in a house under 24-hour cameras, with the winner eventually being chosen by the public to win €50,000. The show eventually returned for a second series with stronger security measures, with the top prize increased to €100,000. The third series, reformatted as La cárcel de los gemelos ("The twins' prison"), increased it further to €250,000.

On 30 December 2025, the brothers recommissioned the show for a third series. The finalists of the second series broadcast the Twelve Grapes for 2025/26 from the Puerta del Sol, attracting 2.7 million viewers.

== Controversies ==
In December 2025, the Association of Users of Communication (AUC) asked the Comisión Nacional de los Mercados y la Competencia to investigate whether the show had broken broadcasting regulations including physical and verbal alteractions, excessive alcohol consumption and homophobic comments. It also criticised the protection of minors, alleging that the first episodes had been broadcast without a clear age classification. A report on Antena 3 Noticias and introduction by Matías Prats criticised the show and other similar productions without traditional TV regulations. A report on Informativos Telecinco echoed Antena 3's concerns, with newscaster Arantxa Morales saying it would be "unthinkable" on linear television.

On 9 January 2025, the LaSexta show Equipo de investigación alleged that the show was funded by sports betting targeted at children, with influencers paid to advertise the twins' sites saying that their promised fees never arrived. The show's set is rented for €500,000. The brothers responded to the show's allegations, saying that "On Gran Hermano Dúo, the first adverts that go out are five for bookmakers and casinos, something they criticise us for... All this has a price and you have to finance it some way or another, just like TV does. All TV has gambling adverts."

== Series 1 ==
- Dates aired: 12–13 October 2025
- Duration: 9 hours
- Prize: €50,000

Name	From	Age	Known for	Duration	Result
Asunción Marto "La Falete"	Seville	28	TikTok influencer	9 hours	Series abandoned
Mercedes Gómez	Almería	57	Zona Gemelos collaborator	9 hours	Series abandoned
Miguel Misha	Madrid	23	TikTok influencer	9 hours	Series abandoned
Triana Marrash	Barcelona	29	Influencer	9 hours	Series abandoned
Ruth Doral	Mallorca	26	TikTok influencer	7 hours	Walked
José Acosta	Mallorca	31	TikTok influencer	7 hours	Walked
Teresa Moreno	Castellón de la Plana	28	TikTok influencer and medium	6 hours	Walked
Manolito Rojas	Madrid	21	Streamer	9 hours	Host

== Series 2 ==
- Dates aired: 7–31 December 2025
- Duration: 24 days
- Prize: €100,000

Name	From	Age	Known for	Entered	Left	Result
Triana Marrash	Barcelona	29	Influencer	Day 0	Day 24	Winner
Asunción Marto "La Falete"	Seville	28	TikTok influencer	Day 0	Day 24	2nd place
Zaira de la Morena	Valencia	25	Contestant on La isla de las tentaciones 7	Day 3	Day 24	3rd place
José Ángel Peregrina "El Patica"	Granada	29	TikTok influencer	Day 0	Day 24	4th place
Aníbal Abdell	California	25	Rapper	Day 9	Day 24	5th place
Miguel Martínez "Sweet Flow"	Barcelona	45	DJ and boxer	Day 0	Day 9	6th place
Miguel Martínez "Sweet Flow"	Barcelona	45	DJ and boxer	Day 13	Day 24	6th place
Nissy Lahr	Alicante	31	Contestant on Secret Story 2	Day 0	Day 24	7th place
Miguel Misha	Málaga	23	TikTok influencer	Day 0	Day 24	8th place
Ángel Aranth "El Toque"	Colón	18	TikTok influencer	Day 10	Day 24	9th place
Laila Lahr	Málaga	31	Contestant on Secret Story 2	Day 15	Day 24	10th place
Paco Porras	Almería	66	Medium	Day 17	Day 19	11th place; Walked
Ruth Dorral	Mallorca	26	TikTok influencer	Day 3	Day 6	12th place
Ruth Dorral	Mallorca	26	TikTok influencer	Day 12	Day 19	12th place
Ana Barriopedro	Madrid	28	Singer and dancer	Day 13	Day 16	13th place
Eros Vidal	Mallorca	29	Contestant on La isla de las tentaciones 8	Day 0	Day 14	14th place
Paula Pereira	Pontevedra	18	TikTok influencer	Day 9	Day 10	15th place; Walked
Cherilyn Divine	Málaga	41	Drag queen	Day 7	Day 9	16th place
José Labrador	Valencia	39	Member of Gandía Shore	Day 0	Day 8	17th place; Ejected
Gabriella Hahlingang	Murcia	27	Contestant on La isla de las tentaciones 7	Day 0	Day 4	18th place; Walked
Teresa Moreno	Castellón	28	TikTok influencer and medium	Day 2	Day 3	19th place; Walked
Andrea Batres	Madrid	24	TikTok influencer and LGBT activist	Day 0	Day 2	20th place; Walked
Beatriz González-Rico Cabra "La Legonaria"	Madrid	45	Contestant on Gran Hermano 6	Day 0	Day 0	21st place; medical evacuation
Aramís Fuster	Barcelona	74	Self-proclaimed witch	Day 0	Day 0	22nd place; Walked
María Rispa	Barcelona	26	Influencer, model and singer	Day 0	Day 0	23rd place; Banned

== Series 3 ("La cárcel de los gemelos") ==
- Dates aired: 15 March – 5 April 2026
- Duration: 21 days
- Prize: €250,000
