= Benidorm Fest 2025 =

Spanish selection for the Eurovision Song Contest 2025

Dates and venue
- Semi-final 1: 28 January 2025
- Semi-final 2: 30 January 2025
- Final: 1 February 2025
- Venue: Palau Municipal d'Esports l'Illa de Benidorm (Benidorm, Valencian Community, Spain)

Organisation
- Broadcaster: Radiotelevisión Española (RTVE)
- Artistic director: Ana María Bordas; César Vallejo
- Executive supervisor: María Eizaguirre
- Presenters: Paula Vázquez; Ruth Lorenzo; Inés Hernand

Participants
- Number of entries: 16
- Number of finalists: 8

Vote
- Voting system: Professional jury (50%) and public voting (50%)
- Winning song: "Esa diva" by Melody

Benidorm Fest 2025 was the fourth edition of the annual Benidorm Fest, a television song contest held in Benidorm, organised and broadcast by Radiotelevisión Española (RTVE). The show was held between 28 January and 1 February 2025. "Esa diva" by Melody won the edition and represented Spain in the Eurovision Song Contest 2025.

== Format ==
The competition consisted of two semi-finals and a final. In total, 16 candidate songs were divided between the two semifinals, that is, eight would participate in each one. In each semifinal, the four songs with the most votes among a professional jury (50%), and the public voting (50%), qualified to the final. During the final, the eight qualified songs were performed again and the winner was determined following the same voting system as in the semi-finals. In response to criticism for the low televoting figures in 2024, attributed to the relatively high costs of telephone calls and SMS messages, RTVE managers stated the goal to make the public voting free by means of a mobile app from 2025; this was confirmed upon the opening of the submission window on 20 May 2024.

Following the 2024 edition of the competition, representatives of Benidorm's municipal council (including mayor Toni Pérez), the Department of Innovation, Industry, Commerce and Tourism of the Generalitat Valenciana, and RTVE travelled to the 74th Sanremo Music Festival, currently serving as the Italian national selection for Eurovision; municipal councillor Jesús Carrobles revealed that the aim was to start a collaboration between the two events. An agreement for a collaboration with the Chilean Viña del Mar International Song Festival was also signed.

=== Presenters ===
At the January 2025 press conference, Paula Vázquez, Ruth Lorenzo and Inés Hernand were announced as the hosts of the competition. In addition, each show was preceded by an introductory segment on RTVE Play, titled Benidorm Calling and hosted by Jordi Cruz, Masi Rodríguez and Iban Garcia, and the finale was followed by a commentary show, titled La noche del Benidorm and hosted by Lalachus and Aitor Albizua.

=== Jury members ===
The jury will consist of four Spanish members and four international members. The Spanish members are radio Roberto Santamaría (director of Radio Nacional de España), Javier Llano (head of music programming at the Cadena 100 radio channel), Jaime Acero (content director at TelevisaUnivision), and Claudia Orellana (director and founder of the Son Buenos music talent management company); the international members are Oksana Skybinska (head of the Ukrainian delegation to the contest), Maja Tokic (executive producer of Dora), Twan van de Nieuwenhuijzen (head of the Dutch delegation to the contest), and Mariangela Borneo (director of international projects and festivals at RAI).

=== Guest performers ===
Edurne and Ginebras performed during the first semi-final. Ruth Lorenzo, Chenoa, and Isabel Aaiún performed during the second semi-final. Nebulossa, Rigoberta Bandini, and Amaral performed during the final.

== Competing entries ==
RTVE published the rules and regulations for Benidorm Fest 2025 on 20 May 2024, opening a submission window lasting until 10 October 2024. In order for an entry to qualify to compete, performers and at least one songwriter must be Spanish citizens over the age of 16 (at least 50% of Spanish citizens in the case of groups), and songs must contain at least 60% of the lyrics in one of the official languages of Spain. On 11 October 2024, RTVE revealed that nearly 1000 entries had been received, about 200 more than the previous edition.

The 16 participants, selected by a professional panel made up of musical advisors Beatriz Luengo, Rayden, Pablo Cebrián and Tony Sánchez-Ohlsson, were originally set to be introduced on 7 November 2024 at the Prado del Rey studios in Madrid; however, on 4 November RTVE revealed that the announcement would be postponed. The artists and songs were announced on 12 November 2024. An additional six reserves were selected.

Benidorm Fest 2025 selected artists and songs
Artist	Song	Songwriter(s)	Arranger(s)
Carla Frigo	"Bésame"	Carla Frigola; Amanda Castillo; Benjamín García	Eyla Bengro
Celine Van Heel	"La casa"	Alfred García; Celine Van Heel	Alfred García; Pol Álvarez; Tom Johnson
Chica Sobresalto	"Mala feminista"	Maialen Gurbindo	Chica Sobresalto
Daniela Blasco	"Uh nana"	Félix Joan; Óscar Campos; Carlos José Montado; Daniela Blasco	Félix Joan; Óscar Campos
David Afonso	"Amor barato"	Alejandro Martínez; Luis Ramiro	Lex C
DeTeresa	"La pena"	Inés Ramos DeTeresa; Vera Noor	DeTeresa
Henry Semler	"No lo ves"	Henry Semler	Henry Lardner Semler; Pepe Bernabé
J Kbello	"VIP"	J Kbello; Ricardo Furiati; Dangelo Ortega; María Parrado; José Otero	Luis del Toro
K!ngdom	"Me gustas tú"	Andrea Rada; Iván Ramírez; Jorge Gomis	Pau Paredes
Kuve	"Loca xti"	Maryan Frutos; Juan Sueiro	Maryan Frutos; Juan Sueiro
Lachispa	"Hartita de llorar"	Claudia Gómez Galindo; Alejandro "Jimbo" Páez Lou; Eduardo Figueroa Espadas; Juan Diego Lazo Gonzales; Silvia Expósito Mansilla	Chanela Clicka "Jimbo Páez"; "Eduardo Figueroa"
Lucas Bun	"Te escribo en el cielo"	Lucas Bun; Luis García Ollés	Pau Aymí
Mawot	"Raggio di sole"	Roberto Comins Cubertorer	Julián Gálvez Vozmediano
Mel Ömana	"I'm a Queen"	Mel Ömana; Alejandro Martínez; Lex C	Lex C
Melody	"Esa diva"	Alberto Lorite; Melodía Ruiz Gutiérrez	Joy Deb; Peter Boström; Thomas G:Son
Sonia & Selena	"Reinas"	Mark Dasousa; Arturo Martínez Marzo	Mark Dasousa

== Contest overview ==
=== Semi-final 1 ===
The first semi-final took place on 28 January 2025. Eight entries competed and four qualified for the final.

Semi-final 1 – 28 January 2025
R/O	Artist	Song	Expert jury	Public vote				Total	Place
R/O	Artist	Song	Expert jury	Televote	App	Total	Points	Total	Place
1	Kuve	"Loca xti"	65	586	8,653	9,239	56	121	3
2	David Afonso	"Amor barato"	33	300	3,030	3,330	32	65	8
3	Chica Sobresalto	"Mala feminista"	50	203	8,060	8,263	50	100	5
4	K!ngdom	"Me gustas tú"	29	1,056	6,263	7,319	44	73	7
5	Lucas Bun	"Te escribo en el cielo"	64	477	5,635	6,112	40	104	4
6	Sonia & Selena	"Reinas"	31	249	9,169	9,418	60	91	6
7	Lachispa	"Hartita de llorar"	83	340	19,062	19,402	70	153	2
8	Daniela Blasco	"Uh nana"	77	641	24,798	25,439	80	157	1

=== Semi-final 2 ===
The second semi-final took place on 30 January 2025. Eight entries competed and four qualified for the final.

Semi-final 2 – 30 January 2025
R/O	Artist	Song	Expert jury	Public vote				Total	Place
R/O	Artist	Song	Expert jury	Televote	App	Total	Points	Total	Place
1	Mel Ömana	"I'm a Queen"	90	1,009	16,494	17,503	70	160	1
2	Henry Semler	"No lo ves"	50	171	2,139	2,310	32	82	7
3	DeTeresa	"La pena"	22	468	12,596	13,064	60	82	6
4	J Kbello	"VIP"	65	663	12,338	13,001	56	121	3
5	Carla Frigo	"Bésame"	37	2,799	2,882	5,681	50	87	5
6	Mawot	"Raggio di sole"	54	329	4,891	5,220	44	98	4
7	Celine Van Heel	"La casa"	36	239	3,100	3,339	40	76	8
8	Melody	"Esa diva"	78	1,378	34,371	35,749	80	158	2

=== Final ===
Taking place on 1 February 2025, "Esa diva" performed by Melody won the final, becoming the entry representing Spain in the Eurovision Song Contest 2025.

Final – 1 February 2025
R/O	Artist	Song	Expert jury	Public vote				Total	Place
R/O	Artist	Song	Expert jury	Televote	App	Total	Points	Total	Place
1	Daniela Blasco	"Uh nana"	71	2,309	38,350	40,659	70	141	2
2	Kuve	"Loca xti"	52	735	8,775	9,510	44	96	6
3	Mawot	"Raggio di sole"	18	512	6,104	6,616	40	58	8
4	Lachispa	"Hartita de llorar"	48	912	22,614	23,526	50	98	5
5	Mel Ömana	"I'm a Queen"	61	2,486	27,935	30,421	56	117	4
6	J Kbello	"VIP"	74	3,103	28,213	31,316	60	134	3
7	Lucas Bun	"Te escribo en el cielo"	38	1,247	4,831	6,078	32	70	7
8	Melody	"Esa diva"	70	6,118	86,272	92,390	80	150	1

== Ratings ==
Viewing figures by show
Show	Air date	Viewers (millions)	Share (%)	Ref.
Semi-final 1	28 January 2025	1.215	13.1%	
Semi-final 2	30 January 2025	1.030	11.7%	
Final	1 February 2025	1.938	17.1%	
