= TQM =

TQM or tqm may refer to:

- T.Q.M., album by Spanish singer Melody (2003)
- "TQM" (song), song by Fuerza Regida (2023)
- Turumsa language ISO 639:3 code
- Total quality management
