= Esa diva =

2024 song by Melody

Single by Melody
- Language: Spanish
- Released: 20 December 2024
- Length: 2:57 (original version); 2:58 (revamped version)
- Label: Rumbera Record; Altafonte
- Songwriters: Alberto Fuentes Lorite; Melodía Ruiz Gutiérrez
- Producers: Original: Joy Deb; Peter Boström; Thomas G:son; Revamp: Eighty4; Rick Parkhouse; George Tizzard; Guillem Vila Borràs

Melody singles chronology
"Bandido" (2024)	"Esa diva" (2024)	"El Apagón" (2025)

Music video
- "Esa diva" on YouTube

Alternative covers
- Benidorm Fest Edit cover

Eurovision Song Contest 2025 entry
- Country: Spain
- Artist: Melody
- Languages: Spanish
- Composers: Alberto Fuentes Lorite; Melodía Ruiz Gutiérrez
- Lyricists: Alberto Fuentes Lorite; Melodía Ruiz Gutiérrez

Finals performance
- Final result: 24th
- Final points: 37

Entry chronology
- ◄ "Zorra" (2024)

Official performance video
- "Esa diva" (First semi-final) on YouTube "Esa diva" (Final) on YouTube

"Esa diva" (Spanish: [ˈesa ˈdiβa]; transl. That Diva) is a song by Spanish singer Melody, written by herself alongside Alberto Fuentes Lorite. It was released on 20 December 2024, and produced by Joy Deb, Peter Boström, and Thomas G:son. It competed in the Benidorm Fest 2025, which it ultimately won and represented Spain in the Eurovision Song Contest 2025. A revamped version of the song, produced by Eighty4, Rick Parkhouse, George Tizzard, and Guillem Vila Borràs, was released on 13 March 2025, alongside an accompanying music video directed by Mario Ruiz.

== Background ==
=== Conception ===
"Esa diva" was written by Melody and Alberto Fuentes Lorite. It was originally produced by Joy Deb, Peter Boström, and Thomas G:son.

=== Revamped version and music video ===
A revamped version of "Esa diva", produced by Eighty4, Rick Parkhouse, George Tizzard, and Guillem Vila Borràs, was released on 13 March 2025, alongside an accompanying music video directed by Mario Ruiz.

=== Symphonic version ===
A symphonic version of "Esa diva", arranged and orchestrated by Borja Arias, and performed by Melody along the RTVE Symphony Orchestra and Choir conducted by Raúl Benavent at the Teatro Monumental in Madrid, was released on 1 April 2025.

== Eurovision Song Contest 2025 ==
=== Benidorm Fest 2025 ===
Radiotelevisión Española (RTVE), organised a 16-entry competition, Benidorm Fest 2025, the fourth iteration of the event, in order to select its entry for the Eurovision Song Contest 2025. It consisted of two semi-finals consisting of eight songs, with the top four songs in each semi-final qualifying for the final. The results of each show were determined through a combination of public televoting, a mobile app vote, and an expert jury. The categories made up of 25%, 25%, and 50% of the total vote, respectively.

RTVE announced "Esa diva" as a competing song in the selection on 12 November 2024, and released it on 20 December 2024. It was placed into the second semi-final, where it was drawn to perform last. On 30 January 2025, it qualified from its semi-final, after finishing in the top half of the jury and public votes. On 1 February 2025, "Esa diva" was performed last in the final, and won the contest after getting first place from the televote and third place from the jury. As a result, it represented Spain in the Eurovision Song Contest 2025.

=== At Eurovision ===
The Eurovision Song Contest 2025 took place at St. Jakobshalle in Basel, Switzerland, and consisted of two semi-finals held on the respective dates of 13 and 15 May and the final on 17 May 2025. As Spain was a member of the "Big Five", "Esa diva" automatically qualified for the grand final. In the final, the song placed twenty-fourth out of the twenty-six competing entries with 37 points.

== Critical reception ==
Jon O’Brien from Vulture ranked the song 10th, calling the song "a bit too fabulous for its own good". Angelica Frey from The Guardian dubbed the song as one of the 10 best Eurovision songs of 2025.

== Commercial performance ==
"Esa diva" debuted at number 29 on the official music charts in Spain following its victory at the Benidorm Fest. It gained momentum after its performance in Eurovision, climbing to number 22 after the first semi-final on 13 May. The track then soared to number 2 the following week, boosted by the exposure from the Grand Final on 17 May.

Internationally, the song also saw moderate success: it reached number 47 in Finland, 53 in Lithuania, 40 in Switzerland, 53 in Greece, and 5 on Sweden’s Heatseeker chart. In the United Kingdom, it charted at number 62 on the Singles Downloads Chart and 65 on the Singles Sales Chart. In Estonia the song was the 51st most streamed song on Spotify the week of May 22, 2025. The song also entered the "Spain Songs chart" published by Billboard at number 24, making it Melody's first song to enter a Billboard chart since her 2001 hit "De pata negra". The following week the song moved up and peaked at number 2. The song was also certified gold in Spain.

== Awards and nominations ==
Year	Award	Category	Result	Ref.
2026	Premio Lo Nuestro	Best Pop/Urban EuroSong	Nominated	

== Track listing ==
Digital download/streaming – Benidorm Fest edit

1. "Esa diva" (Benidorm Fest Edit) – 2:57

Digital download/streaming – Eurovision version

1. "Esa diva" – 2:58

Digital download/streaming – Epic version

1. "Esa diva" (Epic Version) – 3:32

== Charts ==
Chart performance for "Esa diva"
Chart (2025)	Peak position
Finland (Suomen virallinen lista)	47
Greece International (IFPI)	53
Lithuania (AGATA)	53
Spain (PROMUSICAE)	2
Sweden Heatseeker (Sverigetopplistan)	5
Switzerland (Schweizer Hitparade)	40
UK Singles Downloads (Official Charts)	62
UK Singles Sales (OCC)	65

=== Monthly charts ===
Monthly chart performance for "Esa Diva"
Chart (2025)	Peak position
Spain (TopHit)	13

=== Yearly charts ===
2025 year-end chart performance for "Esa Diva"
Chart (2025)	Peak position
Spain (PROMUSICAE)	57

== Certifications and sales ==
Certifications and sales for "Esa diva"
Region	Certification	Certified units/sales
Spain (Promusicae)	Platinum	100,000^{‡}
^{‡} Sales+streaming figures based on certification alone.

== Release history ==
Release history and formats for "Esa diva"
Country	Date	Format(s)	Version	Label	Ref.
Various	20 December 2024	Digital download; streaming	Benidorm Fest edit	Rumbera Record; Altafonte	
Various	14 March 2025	Digital download; streaming	Eurovision version	Rumbera Record; Altafonte	
Various	28 November 2025	Digital download; streaming	Epic version	Rumbera Record; Altafonte	
