= El baile del gorila =

Single by Melody

from the album De pata negra
- Released: 2001
- Genre: Latin pop; rumba
- Label: Epic; Sony
- Songwriter: J.A. Benitez
- Producer: Gustavo Ramudo

Melody singles chronology
"El baile del gorila" (2001)	"De pata negra" (2001)

Music video
- "El baile del gorila" on YouTube

"El baile del gorila" (English translation: "Gorilla Dance") is the debut single by Spanish singer Melody, taken from her debut album De pata negra. She released it in 2001, at the age of 10.

The song debuted at number two in Spain for the week of 7 July 2001, climbing to number one two weeks later. It was the dance hit of that summer in Spain. She also released an English-language version of the song. In 2025, the music video was the 84th most watched video on YouTube in Spain in for the week ending 22 March.

== Track listing ==
Promo 7" single — Sony Music SAMP5 10174 (Spain)
No.	Title	Length
1.	"El baile del gorila"	3:08

== Charts ==
=== Weekly charts ===
Chart (2001–2002)	Peak position
Spain (Promusicae)	1
US Latin Pop Airplay (Billboard)	34
US Tropical Airplay (Billboard)	20

=== Year-end charts ===
Chart (2001)	Peak position
Spain (AFYVE)	13

== Certifications ==
Region	Certification	Certified units/sales
Spain (Promusicae)	Platinum	50,000^{^}
^{^} Shipments figures based on certification alone.
