= Melody (Spanish singer) =

Spanish singer

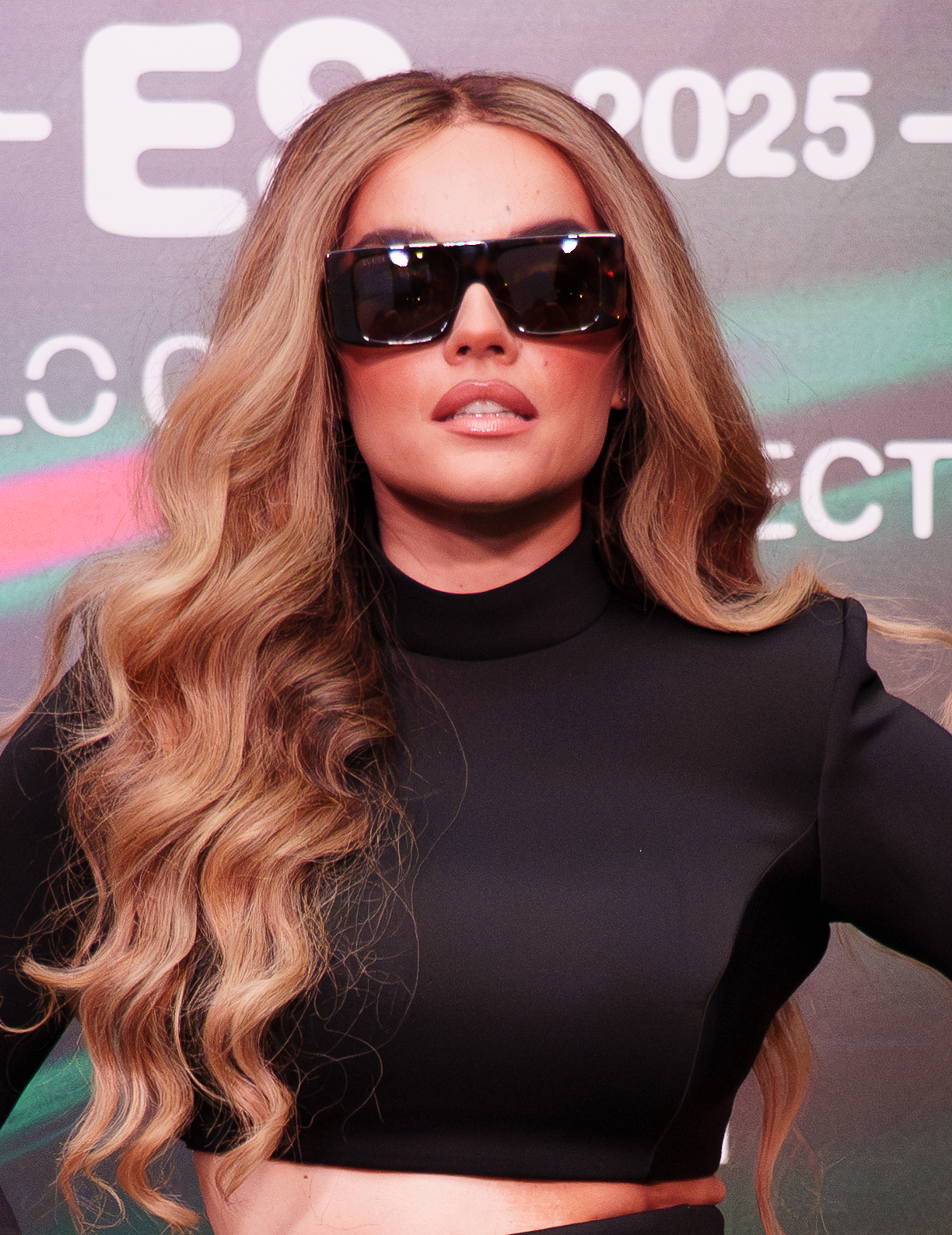
- Melody in 2025
- Born: Melodía Ruiz Gutiérrez; 12 October 1990 (age 36); Dos Hermanas, Spain
- Occupations: Singer; songwriter; dancer; actress; model
- Years active: 2001–present
- Musical career
- Genres: Pop; new flamenco (pop flamenco); Latin pop; dance-pop; hip-hop
- Instruments: Vocals; guitar; piano
- Labels: Sony; Rumba
- Website: Official website

Signature
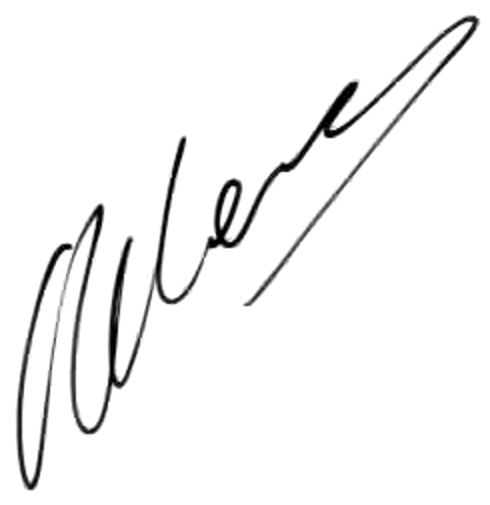

Melodía Ruiz Gutiérrez (born 12 October 1990), best known by her stage name Melody, is a Spanish singer, songwriter, dancer, actress and model. Melody became famous at the age of 10 with her song "El baile del gorila", one of the biggest summer hits of 2001 in Spain. She has released six albums and numerous successful singles in the Spanish and Latin American markets. She represented Spain at the Eurovision Song Contest 2025 with the song "Esa diva", finishing in 24th place.

== Early life ==
Melodía Ruiz Gutiérrez was born on 12 October 1990, in Dos Hermanas (Seville), Andalusia. Her family has strong ties to music; her father and some other family members played in a Sevilla fiesta band called Los Quillos or Los Kiyos, a Jackson 5-like group of child singers.

Melody learned to sing before she could talk. At six, she declared (to her mother) that she was born to sing and dance. Her mother tried to discourage her, saying music was a difficult profession, but she persisted.

== Career ==
=== 2001: De pata negra ===
Melody was discovered by rumba flamenca veteran and producer El Fary after her father sent him a demo tape of her singing. El Fary was impressed and asked her to come to Madrid to record an album. In 2001, at the age of 10, Melody released her debut album De pata negra. The album was produced by Gustavo Ramudo at El Fary's Carabirubí Producciones and released through Epic Spain (Sony Music Entertainment Spain).

The lead single "El baile del gorila", which was written and composed by José Antonio Benítez Serrano, became a big summer hit in Spain. It reached number one in Spain for the week of 21 July. Melody became a child prodigy of Spanish music.

The song "De pata negra" was released as the second single from her debut album; it debuted at number 18 in Spain for the week of 15 September 2001 and peaked at number 12 three weeks later.

Melody's debut album sold between 500,000 and 600,000 copies (2004). By October 2001, it had been certified double platinum in Spain for selling 200,000 copies. On 30 October, it was released in the United States and in Latin America. In May 2002, it was certified gold and then platinum (Latin) in the US by the Recording Industry Association of America. The same year, it received a Latin Grammy nomination for Best Children's Album at the 3rd Annual Latin Grammy Awards.

=== 2002: Muévete ===
On 21 February 2002, Melody performed at the Viña del Mar music festival.

On 10 June 2002, she released her second album, Muévete, also produced by Gustavo Ramudo. The title track "Muévete" debuted at number 11 in Spain for the week of 2 June 2002, peaking at number 7 one week later. The album sold 50,000 copies.

=== 2003: T.Q.M. ===
In early 2003, Melody's first album De pata negra was a finalist for the Billboard Latin Music Award in the category "Latin Pop Album of the Year, New Artist". Her third album T.Q.M. was released on 23 June 2003. It was produced by Luis Gómez-Escolar and Julio Seijas. The first single was "Será". The song "Dabadabadá" was featured on the Spanish soundtrack for the Brazilian telenovela Mulheres Apaixonadas. The soundtrack album, which also includes tracks by Jon Secada, Gloria Estefan, Huey Dunbar, and other well-known Spanish-language artists, went on sale on 23 March 2004. "Dabadabadá" was released as a single and debuted at number 9 in Spain for the week of 14 September 2003. Melody's third album sold 30,000 copies.

In November 2003, Melody appeared on the Disney DVD Ellas & magia, a compilation of Disney princesses' songs performed in Spanish by famous artists including Pastora Soler, Marta Sánchez, and Bellepop. Melody sang "No diré que es amor" from the animated film Hercules. Profits from the DVD went to the Fundación de Ayuda contra la Drogadicción.

=== 2004: Melodía ===
On 18 October 2004, Melody released her fourth album Melodía, which saw her move towards a teenage audience. The album was produced by Danilo Ballo and a team led by Emanuele Ruffinengo. The first single was "Y ese niño", which was composed by Lucas González Gómez from the duo Andy y Lucas. The album debuted at number 15 in Spain for the week of 30 October 2004.

That year, Melody also released a duet with Greek tenor Mario Frangoulis. The song, titled "Cu'mme", was part of Frangoulis' second international album Follow Your Heart, which was released on 9 November 2004, on Sony Classical.

=== 2005–2008: Urban legend ===
By 2005 Melody had disappeared from the media and waited three years to release another record, dedicating that time to her personal development and finishing her studies. Due to her complete disappearance from the media, a rumour that she had died began circulating. An urban legend claimed she was killed in an airplane accident. Another version of her death myth, presented by a blog titled Los Corotos, alleged she committed suicide while suffering from depression, but it turns out it was another person named Melody (not Melodía, which is the singer's real name) who died. Melody dismissed the rumours when she released her fifth album Los buenos días in 2008.

=== 2008: Los buenos días ===
Los buenos días was produced by Queco and was mastered in New York. Melody was 17 at the time of the album's release, and the album was marketed as her "first disc of maturity". Melody co-wrote some of the tracks. The first single was "Te digo adiós", a modern rumba flamenca song. In it, Melody appeared to become a woman.

=== 2009: Eurovision Song Contest preliminaries ===
At the end of 2008, Melody collaborated with Los Vivancos, a flamenco dance group, on a song titled "Amante de la luna", which was written by Manolo Carrasco and Fernando Bermúdez.

Melody and Los Vivancos entered the Spanish national pre-selection for the Eurovision Song Contest 2009, to be held in Moscow. The selection process was organized by Radiotelevisión Española (RTVE) and began with an online vote on the RTVE website, which Melody and Los Vivancos won with 208,481 votes and advanced directly to the semifinals.

On 14 February 2009, they performed in the first of three semifinals and, having received the maximum support from the jury (12 points) and the highest score from the viewers (12 points), finished first and advanced directly to the final. In the final, held on 28 February 2009, Melody, this time on her own after Los Vivancos' withdrawal, received the same number of points (22) as Soraya with her song "La noche es para mí", but it was Soraya who was declared the winner because she scored higher in the televote.

=== 2012: "Ten cuidaíto conmigo" ===
In 2012, Melody gave a preview of her sixth studio album, releasing a single titled "Ten cuidaíto conmigo". The official presentation of the song was held in Málaga in February. The album's title was announced as Mucho camino por andar. Preparing to promote the album, that spring she changed her management office to Serendipity Producciones, S.L.

=== 2013–2014: Tu cara me suena ===
On 25 February 2013, Melody appeared on Antena 3 in a special charity episode of Tu cara me suena, a show in which celebrities impersonate famous singers. She impersonated Natalia Jiménez and finished second behind Anna Simon.

On 8 March 2013, Melody released a merengue version of her song "No sé", which she re-recorded as a duet with Venezuelan reggaeton artist DJ Pana. The music video for the song was shot on location in Venezuela and Miami and premiered on YouTube on 15 October. In late October, the song reached number 1 in Venezuela.

From October 2013 to March 2014, Melody competed in the third season of Tu cara me suena, reaching the final along with Edurne, Xuso Jones, Llum Barrera, and Florentino Fernández; where she finished second. During the season, she impersonated artists like Bonnie Tyler, Katy Perry, Ricky Martin, Gloria Gaynor, Cher, Gwen Stefani (No Doubt), Alesha Dixon, and Lady Gaga. She won in four of the nineteen episodes in which she appeared.

=== 2014: Mucho camino por andar ===
On 9 June 2014, Melody released her sixth album Mucho camino por andar. Recorded in 2012–2014, it was released on Rumba Records. Melody collaborated with DJ Pana, who appears on the song "Hoy me voy". Other musicians on the album include drummer Waldo Madera, violinist Vasko Vassilev, rapper Gordo Máster, musicians Batio Barnabás and Bori de Alarcón, and songwriter José Antonio Benítez Serrano. The album, which was produced by José Marín and Toni Romero, had a new style and more modern sound than her previous albums, as well as more lyrically mature themes. Most of the songs on the album are ballads.

The album's fourth single "Hoy me voy" was launched on the radio stations Radiolé and CafeOlé on 3 June 2014. On 23 June, the song was named Hit of the Week by the web portal Música al Día.

On 23 December 2014, Melody premiered a music video for the album's second single "Mucho camino por andar".

=== 2015: It's Now or Never, Melek 2 ===
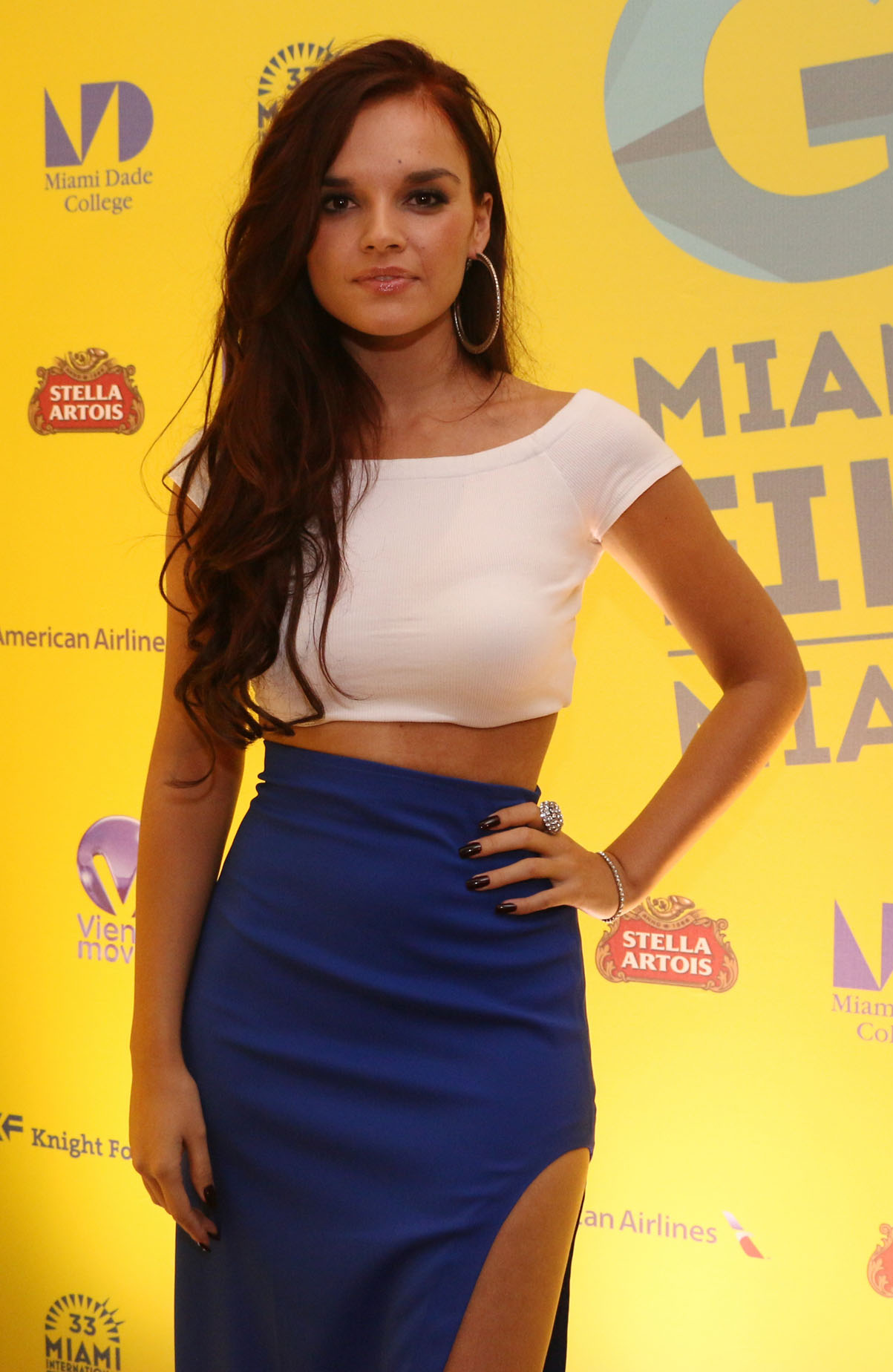
Melody at the 2016 Miami Film Festival

On 29 May 2015, Melody released a ballad titled "In My Mind" as a digital single, It was the main theme of the 2015 Spanish film It's Now or Never, in which Melody also starred, making her acting debut in film.

In addition to her solo career, Melody has formed a musical duo named Melek 2 with her brother Eleazar (Ele). On 2 June 2015, the duo released its first digital single, titled "Tú lo sabes". "Tú lo sabes" peaked at number 24 on the Canal Fiesta Radio chart in October 2015.

=== 2018: "Parapapá" ===
On 29 June 2018, Melody released a new digital single titled "Parapapá". It was her first release since 2015. The track, produced by Rafa Vergana, was recorded in Miami. The music video for this song was uploaded on YouTube on 28 June, and garnered 2.2 million views in its first three weeks.

=== 2019: "Rúmbame" ===
On 15 February 2019, Melody released a new digital single titled "Rúmbame". The music video was released on YouTube on 26 February.

On 18 January, "Mátame", Melody's collaboration with Cuban artists Descemer Bueno and El Micha, was premiered on Descerner Bueno's YouTube channel. The music video was directed by Pedro Vázquez and Descemer Bueno and was filmed in March 2017 during Melody's visit to Cuba at locations in Havana including Jardines de La Tropical.

=== 2024–present: Benidorm Fest, and Eurovision Song Contest ===
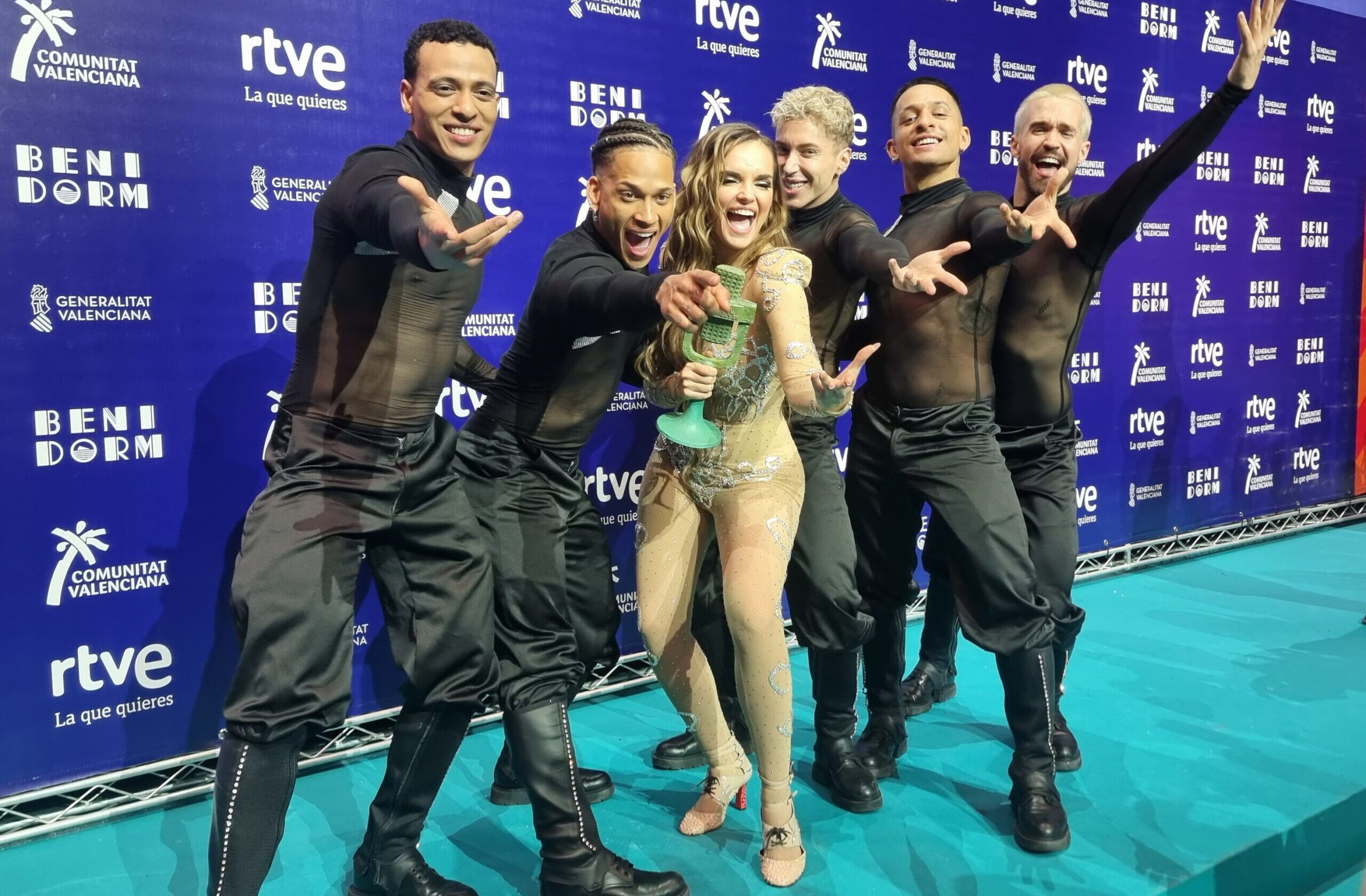
Melody with her dance group after winning Benidorm Fest 2025

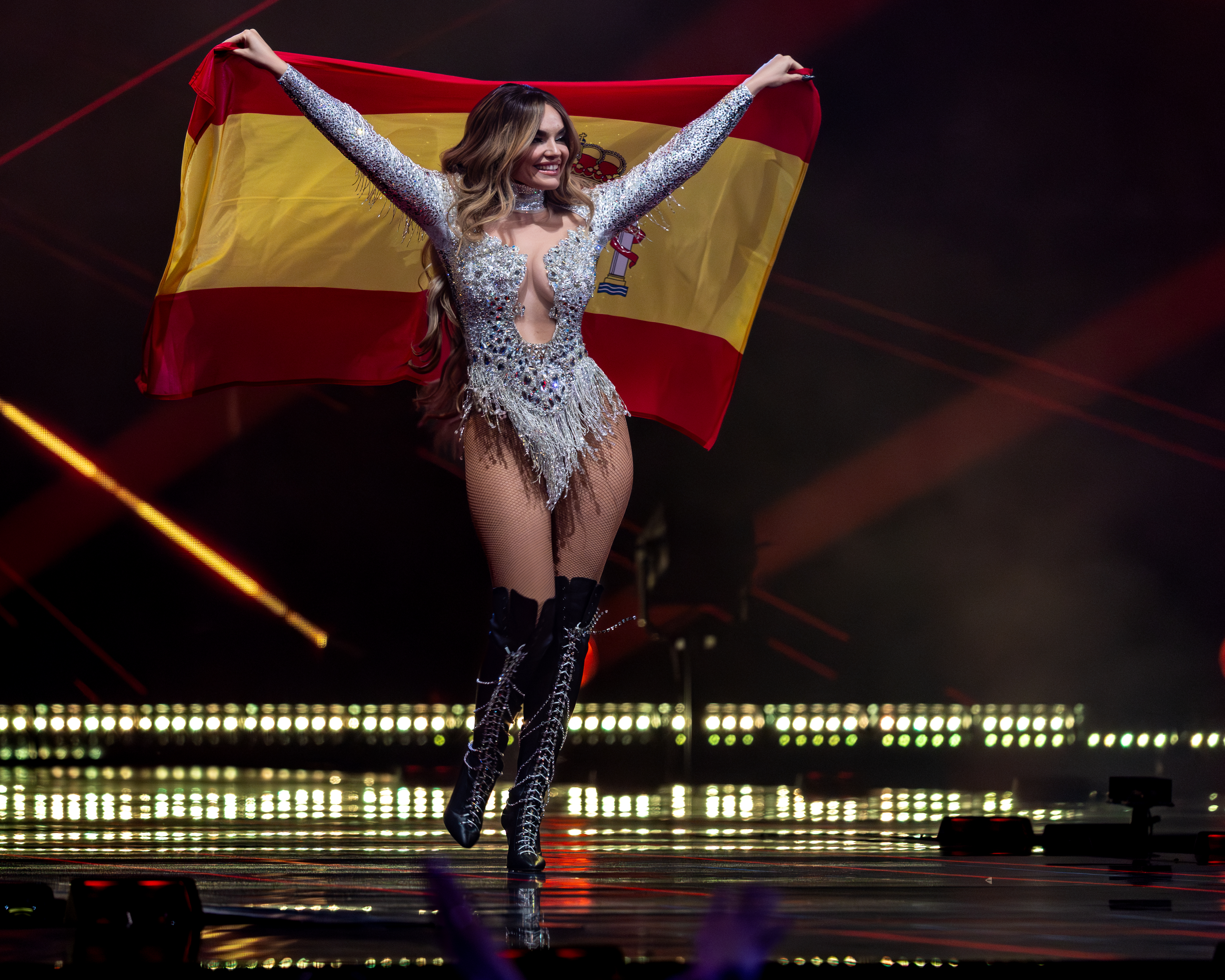
Melody during the flag parade at the Eurovision grand final.

In October 2024, Melody was a guest judge on season 4 of Drag Race España.

On 12 November 2024, RTVE announced Melody among the participants of Benidorm Fest 2025, the Spanish national selection for the Eurovision Song Contest 2025, with the song "Esa diva". On 30 January, Melody performed last in the second Semi-Final and advanced to the Final after finishing in the top half of the jury and public votes. On 1 February, she performed last in the final, and won the contest after getting first place from the televote and third place from the jury. Due to her victory, she represented Spain at the Eurovision Song Contest 2025, where she placed twenty-fourth out of the twenty-six competing entries with 37 points.

In 2025, she returned to Tu cara me suena to premiere her new song, "El apagón".

== Controversies ==
On 19 August 2014, while being interviewed on Cuatro's show Todo va bien, a journalist asked Melody about her refined accent despite being from Dos Hermanas, wondering if she had access to higher education. Melody only answered the second question, pointing out that she had a private tutor since she was 10 years old. The journalist's comments sparked a controversy over the linguistic discrimination of Andalusian Spanish and discrimination of Andalusians overall, with Dos Hermanas Andalusian Party submitting a formal complaint to the Spanish Academy of Television's Ombudsman.

== Personal life ==
She is in a relationship with Ignacio Batallan. They have one child.

== Discography ==
- De pata negra (2001)
- Muévete (2002)
- T.Q.M. (2003)
- Melodía (2004)
- Los buenos días (2008)
- Mucho camino por andar (2014)

== Tours ==
- Esa Diva Tour (2025)

Date (2025)	City	Country	Venue
March 4	Las Palmas	Spain	Gala Pride
March 15	Fuerteventura	Spain	Morro Jable
April 5	Amsterdam	Netherlands	AFAS Live (Eurovision in Concert)
April 13	London	England	LEP 2025
April 18	Madrid	Spain	PreParty ES
April 19	Madrid	Spain	PreParty ES
April 23	Madrid	Spain	Despedida Melody
May 6	Madrid	Spain	Teatro Barceló (Fiesta de la Primavera 2025)
May 17	Basel	Switzerland	Eurovision
May 31	Malaga	Spain	Unknown
June 7	Torremolinos	Spain	Pride
June 15	Maspalomas	Spain	Pride
June 19	Lisbon	Portugal	EuroPride
June 20	Jerez de la Frontera	Spain	Pride
June 21	Zurich	Switzerland	Landiwiese (Zurich Pride Festival 2025)
June 27	Sevilla	Spain	Pride
June 29	Malaga	Spain	Unknown
July 5	Madrid	Spain	Teatro Barceló (Tanga! Pride Fest 2025)
July 18	Barcelona	Spain	Pride
July 26	Alicante	Spain	Unknown
August 1	Granada	Spain	Unknown
August 11	Alicante	Spain	Unknown
August 13	Granada	Spain	Unknown
August 14	Tarragona	Spain	Unknown
August 15	Badajoz	Spain	Unknown
August 20	Cadiz	Spain	Unknown
August 22	Ciudad Real	Spain	Unknown
August 24	Granada	Spain	Unknown
September 4	Palencia	Spain	Unknown
September 6	Badajoz	Spain	Unknown
September 20	Sevilla	Spain	Unknown
October 4	Murcia	Spain	Unknown
October 18	Cadiz	Spain	Unknown
December 6	Barcelona	Spain	Locobongo XXL

== Filmography ==
=== Television ===
Year	Title	Character	Network	Episodes
2002	Cuéntame cómo pasó	Úrsula Vázquez	Televisión Española	1 episode
2016	Cuéntame cómo pasó	Estrella	Televisión Española	1 episode
2018	Arde Madrid	Carmen Sevilla	Movistar+	2 episodes

=== Film ===
Year	Title	Character	Director
2015	It's Now or Never	Irene Fernández	María Ripoll

== Accolades ==
=== Latin Grammy Awards ===
Year	Nominee / work	Award	Result
2002	De pata negra	Best Children's Album	Nominated

=== Latin Billboard Music Awards ===
Year	Nominee / work	Award	Result
2003	De pata negra	Latin Pop Album of the Year, New Artist	Nominated

=== Eurovision Awards ===
Year	Nominee / work	Award	Result
2025	Herself	#ALBM Cover of the Year	Nominated

=== Lo Nuestro Awards ===
Year	Nominee / work	Award	Result
2026	"Esa diva"	Best Pop/Urban EuroSong	Nominated

Awards and achievements
Preceded by Nebulossa	Benidorm Fest winner 2025	Succeeded by Tony Grox and Lucycalys
Preceded by Nebulossa with "Zorra"	Spain in the Eurovision Song Contest; 2025	Succeeded by Incumbent
