= No sé =

2003 song by Melody

Single by Melody

from the album T.Q.M.
- Released: 2003
- Genre: Latin pop
- Label: Sony Music Entertainment Spain S.A.
- Songwriters: Jesus Monarrez Benitez, Melodía Ruiz
- Producers: Luis G. Escolar; Julio Seijas

Melody singles chronology
"Dabadabadá" (2003)	"No sé" (2003)	"Y ese niño" (2004)

Live video
- "No sé" (Música sí, TVE) on YouTube

Acoustic video
- "No sé" (Acústico) on YouTube

"No sé" is a song by Spanish singer Melody. This was a single from her third album T.Q.M.. She released it in 2003, at the age of 12.

== Track listing ==
Promo 7" single — Sony Music SAMPCS 013276 (Spain)
No.	Title	Length
1.	"No sé"	3:53

== Charts ==
=== Year-end charts ===
Chart (2021)	Position
Perú Pop (Monitor Latino)	23

== DJ Pana version ==
"No sé"

Single by DJ Pana featuring Melody
- Released: March 8, 2013
- Genre: Merengue
- Length: 3:53
- Label: Safiro Music
- Songwriters: Jesus Monarrez Benitez, Melodía Ruiz

DJ Pana singles chronology
"Sigo Luchando" (2011)	"No sé" (2013)	"Ya me voy" (2013)

Melody singles chronology
"Ten cuidaíto conmigo" (2012)	"No sé" (2013)	"Hoy me voy" (2014)

Music video
- DJ Pana ft. Melody – "No sé" on YouTube

In 2013, Venezuelan singer and actor DJ Pana released a new version of the song featuring Melody. This version was recorded in Meregue style and included a music video which was shot in Spain.

=== Charts ===
Chart (2013)	Peak position
Venezuela Top 100 (Record Report)	1

== Explosión De Iquitos version ==
"No sé"

Single by Explosión de Iquitos featuring Melody
- Released: February 21, 2021
- Genre: Cumbia
- Length: 4:03
- Label: El Orgullo Amazónico
- Songwriters: Jesus Monarrez Benitez, Melodía Ruiz
- Producer: Raúl Flores Vásquez

Explosión de Iquitos singles chronology
"Eclipse Total del Amor" (2020)	"No sé" (2021)	"Consecuencias" (2021)

Melody singles chronology
"Las cosas del amor" (2020)	"No sé" (2021)	"Sin ley" (2021)

Music video
- Explosión De Iquitos - "No sé" on YouTube

Remix music video
- Explosión De Iquitos ft. Melody - "No sé" on YouTube

In 2021, Peruvian cumbia group Explosión de Iquitos released a Cumbia version of the song. This version instantly became viral on digital platforms like TikTok becoming very successful in Perú. A music video for the song was filmed in the city of Iquitos in the Amazonian jungle released on April 17, 2021, featuring TikToker Ingeniero Bailarín whose viralized video of him dancing to the song made it popular on the social network. Their version topped the charts in Perú. Melody confirmed that she was going to record a remix of this version along with Explosión de Iquitos. The remix was recorded by June 2021 and released on July 31, 2021, along with its music video which was recorded in Iquitos.

=== Charts ===
Chart (2021)	Peak position
Perú (Monitor Latino)	1
Perú Tropical (Monitor Latino)	1
Perú Digital Top 1000 (UNIMPRO)	10

=== Year-end charts ===
Chart (2021)	Position
Perú (Monitor Latino)	14
Perú Tropical (Monitor Latino)	4

=== Awards and nominations ===
The song won Hit of the Year at the Premios Luces 2021.

Year	Awards Ceremony	Category	Result
2021	Premios Luces	Hit of the Year	Won
