= La familia de la tele =

- Genre: Talk show Magazine show
- Created by: Óscar Cornejo; Adrián Madrid; José Pablo López Sánchez; Ana María Bordas
- Directed by: David Valldeperas; Eva Hernández; Isa Morata
- Presented by: Aitor Albizua; Inés Hernand; María Patiño
- Opening theme: La familia de la tele by Camela
- Country of origin: Spain
- Original language: Spanish
- No. of seasons: 1
- No. of episodes: 32

Production
- Running time: 130 minutes
- Production companies: Radiotelevisión Española; La Osa Producciones Audiovisuales
- Budget: €4,194,088

Original release
- Network: La 1
- Release: 5 May – 18 June 2025

La familia de la tele (English: "The TV family") is a Spanish daytime talk and magazine show broadcast on La 1 of Televisión Española (TVE) from 5 May to 18 June 2025. It was hosted by María Patiño, Inés Hernand, and Aitor Albizua. The show aimed to discuss entertainment and the news in a light-hearted manner, combined with frequent discussions with correspondents across Spain.

The show was expected to air on 22 April, but was pushed back by a week due to the death of Pope Francis. The show was then postponed by another week after the blackout across the peninsula. It aired from 15:55 to 17:30, taking a break for La 1's afternoon dramas, before returning from 19:10 to 20:30. Viewers watching on RTVE Play were able to see the full episode uninterrupted.

The show was planned to have sections dedicated to health, sport, psychology, culture and investigations, however these were never implemented. Other segments included cookery with Belén Esteban, spoof reports from Chelo García-Cortés in his segment called "Informe Chemanal" (a play on the name of TVE's Informe Semanal) and "Versión cayetana", a segment in which the cast parodied some of TVE's most famous shows, such as Cuéntame cómo pasó, Verano azul, and Isabel.

From 15 May the show started to be divided into two blocks: the first, presented by Patiño, discussed celebrity gossip and similar themes; while the second, hosted by Albizua and Hernand, discussed current affairs and political affairs. After ratings failed to improve, the show returned to the three-presenter format on 2 June, airing from 15:50 to 17:00. The show was axed on 18 June due to poor ratings.

== Reception ==
Critical and viewer reaction to the premiere was overwhelmingly negative. After ratings failed to improve, Chair of RTVE José Pablo López took responsibility for the failure, saying: "We tried it out, and the programme didn't work." By the end of the show's run, the show's cast admitted that the show's fortunes would not turn around, with Belén Esteban saying: "I got used to being on successful programmes, and real life is probably like this."

Other presenters, such as Marc Giró, defended the show's presenters, saying that he would have kept the programme going for a little longer. Ramón García said that "tabloid programmes don't work anymore". Presenter Inés Hernand suggested that La 1's afternoon audience was not accustomed to the kind of show that La familia de la tele aspired to be, and that the format felt confused. Borja Terán, a critic for 20 minutos, felt that the show's failure was due to what he believed to be the public's rose-tinted view of Sálvame, and that a disjointed format was to blame, rather than the performance of its key figures.

The first part of the show had an average of 570,000 viewers in the afternoons (6.7% share). The second part averaged 402,000 viewers (5.5% share).

=== Budget and union criticism ===
The show's failure also generated criticism for the show's large budget, especially for the number of episodes it was planned to have. The contract for the show gave it a budget of €6 million for the planned sixty-three episodes, however the show's episodes were soon halved and the show cost €4,194,088 overall. Details were soon released about the presenters' (€1,616 per programme) and collaborators' (between €950 and €1,150 per programme) salaries, the monthly salaries of producers (€8,750 and €5,000) and honorariums paid to guests, which could be up to €2,000 per show.

The controversy over a show largely seen as incompatible with TVE's viewership was also linked to a feeling that the show was similar to the trash TV genre premiered by Telecinco, with many of its presenters having been closely linked to Sálvame, Telecinco's former flagship tabloid TV programme. José Pablo López said: "In public-service television we are never going to put up a red line against 'who', but 'what'," saying that public-service TV needed to try out different types of programming.

Trade unions also denounced a show they called "incompatible with the values of public-service TV" and warning of a "loss of credibility" for the network, such as one of the show's presenters being sent to cover the conclave in Rome, which some news organisations believed to be of questionable journalistic rigour.
