= T.Q.M. =

Studio album by Melody
- Released: June 23, 2003
- Genre: Latin pop
- Label: Sony Music Entertainment Spain S.A.
- Producer: Luis G. Escolar; Julio Seijas

Melody chronology
Muévete (2002)	T.Q.M. (2003)	Melodía (2004)

Singles from T.Q.M.
- 1. "Será" Released: 2003; 2. "Dabadabadá" Released: 2003; 3. "No sé" Released: 2003

T.Q.M. is the third album by Spanish singer Melody. She released it in 2003, at the age of 12.

The album was produced by Luis G. Escolar and Julio Seijas. One music video, for the first single titled "Será", was shot.

The album debuted at number 84 in Spain for the week of 28 July 2003. The album sold 30,000 copies, which was a decline from De pata negra's 500,000 and Muévete's 50,000.

== Track listing ==
CD – Sony Music Entertainment Spain S.A. 5124292
No.	Title	Length
1.	"Ya te digo"	3:20
2.	"T.Q.M."	4:01
3.	"No sé"	3:53
4.	"Será"	3:22
5.	"Dancing for You"	3:37
6.	"Pepe"	3:43
7.	"Dabadabadá"	3:04
8.	"La ley del bumerán"	3:17
9.	"Os quiero mucho"	4:05
10.	"Bésame, Drácula"	4:07
11.	"¡Viva la música!"	3:13
12.	"A buena gente guía Dios"	3:12
13.	"Un paraíso"	4:12

== Charts ==
Chart (2003)	Peak position
Spain (AFYVE)	84
