= Kuve =

Spanish singer, songwriter, and record producer (born 1987)

KUVE
- KUVE in 2025

Background information
- Born: Maryan Frutos Maíquez; Murcia, Spain
- Origin: Madrid, Spain
- Genres: Pop; Electronic; Indie pop
- Occupations: Singer; songwriter; record producer
- Years active: 2013–present

Maryan Frutos Maíquez, known by her stage name Kuve (stylized KUVE), is a Spanish singer, songwriter, and record producer from Murcia. She gained national recognition through her participation in Benidorm Fest 2025 with the song "Loca XTI", finishing in sixth place.

== Early life and education ==
Her father was a musician in the 1970s, and her mother is the daughter of a music manager. She began performing on stage at the age of 13 and later studied to become a teacher, earning a degree in education.

== Career ==
=== Early projects ===
KUVE released their first album Regresión in 2013. After the group disbanded, Maryan continued the project as a solo artist. In 2016, she released 3.0, an album funded through crowdfunding. Her third album, Castillos de fuego (2019), marked her breakthrough into Spain's indie music circuit and was nominated for Best Album at the Premios de la Música Región de Murcia.

=== Solo career ===
The success of Castillos de fuego led to performances at major Spanish festivals, including Sonorama Ribera, which she has described as her favorite festival.

=== Collaborations and special performances ===
One of her most notable performances was alongside Nacho Cano on December 31, 2020, when she sang "Un año más" at Puerta del Sol during the New Year's Eve celebration, which was broadcast live on multiple regional television networks during the COVID-19 pandemic.

=== Benidorm Fest 2025 ===
KUVE participated in Benidorm Fest 2025 with the song "Loca XTI", composed by herself and producer Juan Sueiro. This marked her second attempt at the competition, having previously applied in 2024 without reaching the semifinals. The song is described as an electronic pop anthem celebrating true love, with a fusion of 1990s and modern electronic sounds.

== Discography ==
=== Studio albums ===
- Regresión (2012) – with Carlos Otero
- 3.0 (2016)
- Castillos de fuego (2019)
- NO DRAMA (2023)
- AMORE DESAMORE (2026)
