= Muévete =

Single by Melody

from the album Muévete
- Released: 2002
- Genre: Latin pop, rumba
- Label: Epic / Sony Music Entertainment Spain S.A.
- Songwriter(s): J.A. Benitez
- Producer(s): Gustavo Ramudo

Melody singles chronology
| "De pata negra" (2001) | "Muévete" (2002) | "Será" (2003) |

Music video
- "Muévete" on YouTube

"Muévete" is a song by Spanish singer Melody. This was the lead single from her second album Muévete and her third commercial single overall. She released it in 2002, at the age of 11.

The song debuted at number 11 in Spain for the week of 2 June 2002, peaking at number 7 one week later.

== Track listing ==
Promo 7" single — Sony Music SAMPCS 11545 (Spain)
| No. | Title | Length |
|---|---|---|
| 1. | "Muévete" |

== Charts ==
| Chart (2002) | Peak position |
|---|---|
| Spain (PROMUSICAE) | 7 |
