= Muévete (album) =

Studio album by Melody
- Released: June 10, 2002
- Genre: Latin pop, rumba
- Label: Epic / Sony Music Entertainment Spain S.A.
- Producer: Gustavo Ramudo

Melody chronology
De pata negra (2001)	Muévete (2002)	T.Q.M. (2003)

Singles from Muévete
- 1. "Muévete" Released: 2002

Muévete is the second album by Spanish singer Melody. She released it in 2002, at the age of 11.

The album debuted at number 38 in Spain for the week of 10 June 2002, peaking at number 27. The album sold 50,000 copies, which was a sharp decline from De pata negra's 500,000.

== Track listing ==
CD – Epic 508338 2 (Sony)
No.	Title	Length
1.	"Muévete"	3:29
2.	"Ritmo, ritmo"	3:10
3.	"La chica ye-ye"	2:37
4.	"Cuidado con el toro"	3:09
5.	"Margarita"	3:07
6.	"Gusanito rock"	3:27
7.	"Paya o gitana"	3:36
8.	"El piquito"	2:57
9.	"De hombro a hombro"	3:00
10.	"La avispa"	3:32
11.	"Que no me da la gana"	3:02
12.	"Lo mío es la música"	3:08

== Charts ==
Chart (2002–03)	Peak position
Spain (AFYVE)	27
US Top Latin Albums (Billboard)	70
