= María Patiño =

Spanish journalist

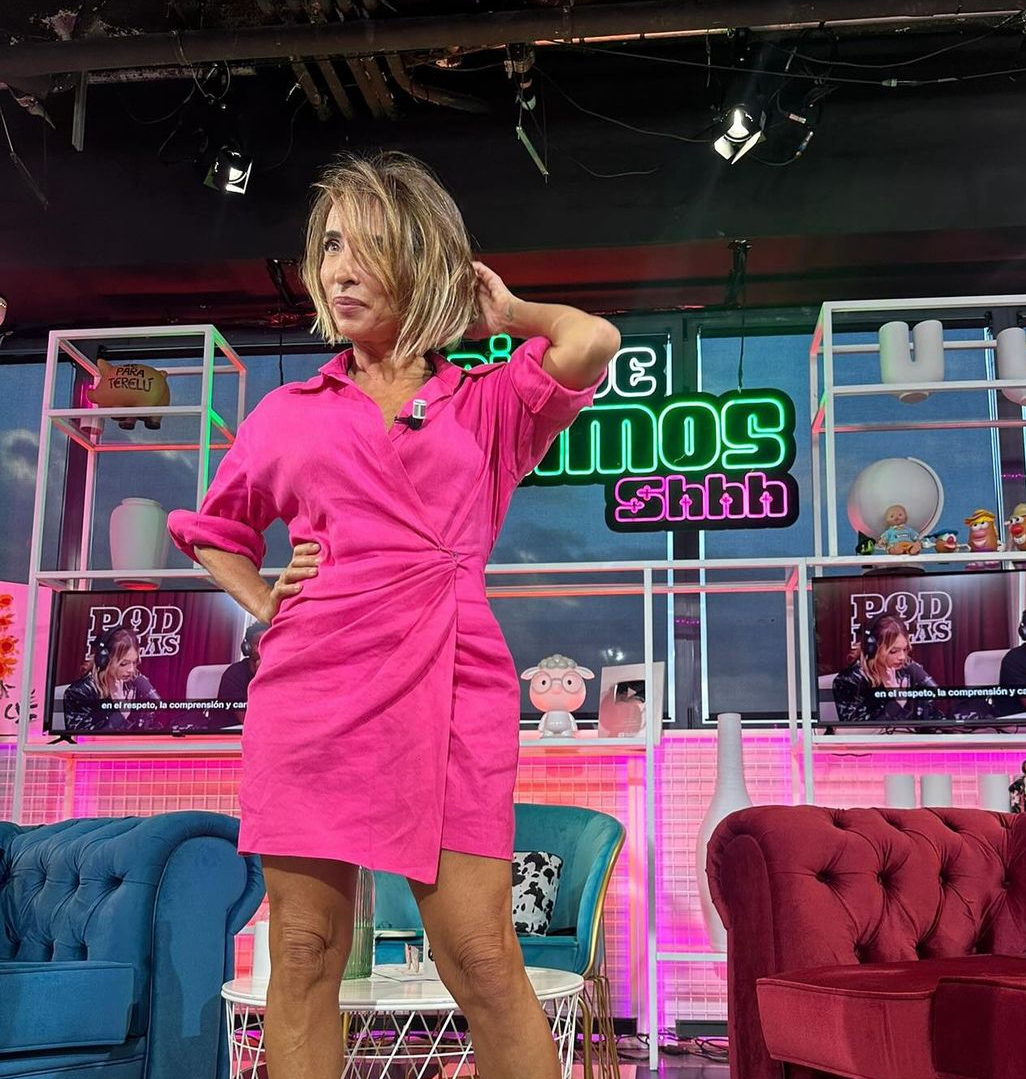
- Patiño on Ni que fuéramos in 2024
- Born: María Patiño Castro; 15 August 1971 (age 54); Ferrol, A Coruña, Galicia, Spain
- Occupation: Television personality
- Years active: 1999–present
- Employers: Antena 3 (2002–2011); Telecinco (2011–2023); Ten (2024–2025, 2025–); TVE (2025)
- Television: El programa de Ana Rosa (2012–2014); Sálvame (2014–2023); Socialité (2017–2023); Ni que fuéramos Shhh (2024–2025); La familia de la tele (2025); No somos nadie (2025–present)

María Patiño Castro (born 16 August 1971) is a Spanish TV personality known for appearing on numerous TV daytime talk shows.

After starting out on regional radio, she started her TV career on Antena 3 before swapping to Telecinco once Antena 3 started to move away from gossip programming. Once she moved to Telecinco's successful talk shows El programa de Ana Rosa and Sálvame, she became a regular face on the network until her departure in 2023. After the success of its replacement, Ni que fuéramos... on Ten, she then hosted La familia de la tele on TVE in 2025. After its cancellation, she returned to Ten with No somos nadie.

== Biography ==
=== Childhood and beginnings ===
The daughter of Antonio Patiño Gacio (1946–2017) and Paz Castro Fustes (1947–2014), María Patiño has two younger siblings, Antonio and Carlos. She was raised in Seville with her parents and siblings, although the family continues to be linked to her native Galicia. Her father, a reserve lieutenant colonel, was vice president of Lar Gallego de Sevilla and the deputy director of the institution's choir.

With a degree in Journalism from the private school CEADE, she started her career at the Seville branch of the news agency Europa Press. Later, she would work at Canal Sur Radio, Giralda Television, and the official agency of Diez Minutos in Andalusia.

=== Antena 3 ===
Patiño's first steps into the TV industry began on the Canal Sur program Ven con nosotros (2001), which was followed by the Antena 3 magazine show Sabor a verano (2002), presented by Inés Ballester.

After her stint on Jordi González's late-night show Abierto al anochecer (2002), she appeared on popular daytime chat show Sabor a ti with Ana Rosa Quintana from 2002 until 2004. However, she came to fame on tabloid talk show ¿Dónde estás corazón? (later renamed DEC), hosted by Jaime Cantizano, where she stayed from 2003 until 2011. From 2007 until 2008 she presented the magazine show A 3 bandas, which was cancelled due to low ratings.

On 13 July 2009, together with Jesús Mariñas and Julian Iantzi, she began presenting the program Vaya par directed by Gema López, although this was also cancelled due to low ratings on 10 September of the same year. Since her departure from DEC, she has not returned to work for Antena 3, as since 2011 the network has moved away from gossip programmes.

=== Telecinco ===
On 15 October 2011, María Patiño held an interview for La noria on Telecinco, speaking with Bárbara Rey, with whom she had a well-publicised dispute in 2007. From 5 November of that year, she began working as a regular contributor to La noria. Months later, on 17 January 2012, she became a regular contributor to El programa de Ana Rosa, reuniting with Ana Rosa Quintana, and Sálvame Deluxe.

In the summer of 2014, after the departure of Terelu Campos, María replaced Jorge Javier Vázquez hosting Sálvame Deluxe for eleven episodes: seven normal programs, three pre-recorded specials, and one live special. During Vázquez's 2014 Christmas break, Patiño returned as presenter.

On 16 October 2014, her incorporation into Sálvame as an official contributor was announced. During this time, Patiño suffered the loss of her mother and father.

She later became the main relief presenter of Sábado Deluxe, hosting when Vázquez was unavailable. In addition, from 2017 until 2023 she also presented Socialité on the same network.

In 2023 Telecinco axed Sálvame and similar tabloid talk shows in a schedule shake-up. Patiño was the co-presenter for the show's final episode on 23 June 2023 and for the last episode of Deluxe on 14 June. Her time on Telecinco ended on 25 December 2023 after La Fábrica de la Tele, the producers of Socialité, broke off with Telecinco.

=== Stage on Canal Quickie and swap to TVE ===
Patiño's first presenting role after the end of Sálvame was on a Netflix show ¡Sálvese quién pueda!, following former Sálvame collaborators on tour in Miami and Mexico City. In 2024, she launched Ni que fuéramos with other former Sálvame collaborators on the Ten channel, which attracted strong audiences, including in valuable demographics.

After the success of Ni que fuéramos, TVE signed the show's collaborators, including Patiño, to launch La familia de la tele on La 1 on 5 May 2025, having twice been pushed back due to the passing of Pope Francis and the Iberian Peninsula blackout in April of that year. The show was soon reformatted and eventually axed after attracting poor ratings.

In September 2025, they returned to Ten to host No somos nadie from Monday to Thursday in the afternoons. On January 16, 2026, the end of the format was announced, with its final broadcast on January 30 of the same year.

=== Other networks ===
In 2015 María Patiño debuted as an actress with the short film La cara del diablo, appearing alongside her romantic partner Ricardo Rodríguez Olivares. Previously she had had minor roles in 2011's Torrente 4: Lethal Crisis, where she made a cameo as a tabloid reporter covering an event, and in 2004, when she played herself in the eighth episode of the third season of Aquí no hay quien viva, where a resident of the building attends the set of Dónde estás corazón. In that chapter, she worked with her colleagues Jaime Cantizano, Chelo García-Cortés, and Antonio Montero.

== Filmography ==
=== TV programs ===
Year	Title	Channel	Notes
2001	Ven con nosotros	Canal Sur	Contributor
2002	Abierto al anochecer	Antena 3	Contributor
2002	Sabor a ti	Antena 3	Contributor
2002–2004	Sabor a ti	Antena 3	Contributor
2003–2011	DEC	Antena 3	Contributor
2005	La buena onda de la tarde	Antena 3	Contributor
2007–2008	A 3 bandas	Antena 3	Presenter
2009	Vaya par	Antena 3	Presenter
2011–2012	La noria	Telecinco	Contributor
2012–2015	El programa de Ana Rosa	Telecinco	Contributor
2012–2023	Sábado Deluxe	Telecinco	Contributor
2012–2023	Sábado Deluxe	Telecinco	Presenter
2013–2014	Abre los ojos y mira	Telecinco	Contributor
2014–2023	Sálvame	Telecinco	Contributor
2017	Las Campos	Telecinco	Presenter
2017–2023	Socialité	Telecinco	Presenter
2017–2018	Campanadas Fin de Año	Telecinco,	Presenter
2024–2025	Ni que fuéramos	Canal Quickie,	Presenter
2024	La Velada del Año IV		Co-Host
2025	La familia de la tele	La 1	Co-Host
2025–2026	No somos nadie	Canal Quickie,	Presenter

=== TV series ===
Year	Title	Character	Notes
2004	Aquí no hay quien viva	Herself	1 episode
2005	Homo Zapping	Herself / The Cook	1 episode

=== Films ===
Year	Title	Character	Notes
2011	Torrente 4: Lethal Crisis	Journalist	Minor role
2015	La cara del diablo	María Robles	Short film
