= Dabadabadá =

Single by Melody

from the album T.Q.M.
- Released: 2003
- Genre: Latin pop
- Label: Sony Music Entertainment Spain S.A.
- Songwriter(s): J.A. Benitez
- Producer(s): Luis G. Escolar; Julio Seijas

Melody singles chronology
| "Será" (2003) | "Dabadabadá" (2003) | "No Sé" (2003) |

Music video
- "Dabadabadá" (Música sí, TVE) on YouTube

"Dabadabadá" is a song by Spanish singer Melody. This was a single from her third album T.Q.M.. She released it in 2003, at the age of 12.

The song debuted at number 9 in Spain for the week of 14 September 2003.

The song was part of the Spanish soundtrack to the Brazilian soap opera Mulheres Apaixonadas (Mujeres apasionadas in Spain), appearing on the soundtrack album released in 2004. It's one of the songs Melody is remembered for.

== Live performances ==
Melody performed the song on several television shows in order to promote it with the most notable one being on the show Música Sí.

== Track listing ==
Promo 7" single — Sony Music SAMPCS 013276 (Spain)
| No. | Title | Length |
|---|---|---|
| 1. | "Dabadabadá" |

== Charts ==
| Chart (2003) | Peak position |
|---|---|
| Spain (PROMUSICAE) | 9 |
