= Los buenos días =

Studio album by Melody
- Released: May 19, 2008
- Genre: Latin pop, rumba
- Label: Disparate Records
- Producer: Manuel Ruiz "Queco"

Melody chronology
Melodía (2004)	Los buenos días (2008)	Mucho camino por andar (2014)

Singles from Los buenos días
- 1. "Te digo adiós" Released: 2008

Los buenos días is the fifth album by Spanish singer Melody. She released it on May 19, 2008, at the age of 17, after three years of disappearance from the media – a disappearance so complete that it was even rumoured she was dead.

The album was produced by Cordovan hitmaker Queco, who had written and produced many hits of the time, notably "Aserejé", and mastered in New York. It was meant to be Melody's "first disc of maturity".

One music video, for the first single titled "Te digo adiós", was shot. The album debuted at number 96 in Spain for the week of 8 June 2004, re-entering for a single week more on the chart, at number 70, two weeks later.

== Track listing ==
CD – Disparate Records – DR 0008
No.	Title	Length
1.	"Te digo adiós"	3:53
2.	"Los buenos días"	3:38
3.	"Moneíta"	3:50
4.	"Sin ti a mi lado"	4:31
5.	"Ese pellizquito"	3:27
6.	"La hija de un banquero"	3:54
7.	"Mi alma se enamora"	3:23
8.	"Nadie"	4:09
9.	"Fuente de luna"	3:34
10.	"Sueña conmigo"	4:39
11.	"Navegando en su locura"	4:20

Extras

- "Te digo adós" (Video)

== Charts ==
Chart (2008)	Peak position
Spanish Albums (PROMUSICAE)	70
