= Parapapá =

2018 single by Spanish singer Melody

Single by Melody
- Released: 28 June 2018
- Genre: Latin pop
- Length: 3:37
- Label: Sony Latin
- Songwriters: Melody Ruíz, Vicky Echeverrí, Juanfran Parra, Rafa Vergara, Junior De La Rosa, Elliot Justo
- Producer: Rafa Vergara

Melody singles chronology
"In My Mind" (2015)	"Parapapá" (2018)	"Mátame" (2019)

Music video
- "Parapapá" on YouTube

Parapapá is a song by Spanish singer Melody from among her music albums. It was recorded in Miami, produced by Rafa Vergara, and released by Sony Music on June 28, 2018.

== Background and release ==
The song was written by Melody Ruíz, Vicky Echeverrí, Juanfran Parra, Elliot Justo, Junior De La Rosa, and Rafa Vergara, the latter who also produced the song. The song is a fusion of Latin and tropical rhythms in Castilian. It was released on June 28, 2018 along with its accompanying music video. The video surpassed one million views on YouTube after just a few days of its release.

== Music video ==
The song Parapapá and its music video became available on the same day. Like the music, the video received positive reviews and was described as "sexy".

== Charts ==
=== Weekly charts ===
Chart (2018)	Peak position
Venezuela Pop (Monitor Latino)	18

=== Year-end charts ===
Chart (2018)	Position
Venezuela Pop (Monitor Latino)	78
