= Melodía =

Studio album by Melody
- Released: October 18, 2004
- Genre: Latin pop, rumba
- Label: Sony Music Entertainment Spain, S.A.
- Producer: Danilo Ballo; Emanuele Ruffinengo

Melody chronology
T.Q.M. (2003)	Melodía (2004)	Los buenos días (2008)

Singles from Melodía
- 1. "Y ese niño" Released: 2004; 2. "La novia es chiquita" Released: 2004

Melodía is the fourth album by Spanish singer Melody. She released it on October 18, 2004, at the age of 14. The album saw her move towards a more teenage demographic.

The album was produced by Danilo Ballo and a team led by Emanuele Ruffinengo, who had previously worked with Alejandro Sanz, Ana Belén, Ketama, Malú and Armando Manzanero. Two music videos, for the first single titled "Y ese niño" (composed by Lucas González Gómez from the duo Andy y Lucas), and for the second single titled "La novia es chiquita", were shot.

The album debuted at number 15 in Spain.

== Track listing ==
CD – Sony Music SM 5180012
No.	Title	Length
1.	"La novia es chiquita"	3:50
2.	"Agítalo"	3:18
3.	"Hay un camino"	4:30
4.	"Y ese niño"	4:30
5.	"Magnetismo"	4:27
6.	"Vete de aquí"	3:53
7.	"Eres mi tierra cielo"	4:14
8.	"Loca"	3:21
9.	"Bandolero"	3:17

== Charts ==
Chart (2004)	Peak position
Spain (AFYVE)	33
