= Ten (Spanish TV channel) =

Spanish television network

- Country: Spain
- Broadcast area: Spain
- Headquarters: Madrid

Programming
- Language: Spanish
- Picture format: 1080i HDTV

Ownership
- Owner: Grupo Secuoya; Ten Media (Operator)

History
- Launched: 28 April 2016
- Former names: 10

Links
- Website: https://tentv.es

Availability

Terrestrial
- DVB-T: Check local frequencies

Ten is a Spanish free-to-air television channel run by Ten Media, a property of Grupo Secuoya.

== History ==
In October 2015, Grupo Secuoya was announced as one of the winning companies of a digital terrestrial television license. Subsequently, the group announced that the television channel would air a generalist format.

On December 24, 2015, the test signals of the channel began, which was called 10. On February 18, 2016, the official name of the channel was announced: "Ten", in addition to the start of transmission for April 21, 2016.

Between April 2016 and April 2018, the channel maintained its own programming, to be later withdrawn; as of that point, it only broadcast five programs, in addition to home shopping slots and tarot programs, as a result of the poor financial results derived from a low audience.

On October 30, 2018, an agreement between Grupo Secuoya and Mediapro for the management of the channel's programming was announced, in order to seek an improvement in viewing rates.

In February 2020, the channel suffered a crisis in viewer numbers due to the change in broadcast frequencies, losing half of its daily viewers. At the end of 2020, the channel began another process of remodelling its programming when it decided to broadcast American television series as Monk or House, and Hispanic talk shows like Caso Cerrado, in addition to withdrawing tarot and home shopping-based programming.

== Programming ==
Ten's programming is entertainment-based. In particular, reality shows and docudramas are broadcast, in addition to some television series as Law & Order: UK, Law & Order: Criminal Intent, Caso Cerrado and In Ice Cold Blood.

In 2024, the channel premiered Ni que fuéramos Shhh..., a tabloid talk show intended as a spiritual successor to Telecinco's cancelled Sálvame.
