= De pata negra =

Studio album by Melody
- Released: August 3, 2001
- Genre: Pop
- Length: 36:36

Melody chronology
| De pata negra (2001) | Muévete (2002) |

Singles from De pata negra
- 1. "El baile del gorila" Released: 2001; 2. "De pata negra" Released: 2001

De pata negra is the first studio album by Spanish singer Melody. It was released in Spain two weeks after the single "El baile del gorila". The album sold more than 600,000 copies worldwide.

== Track listing ==
1. El baile del gorila 3:11
2. Mi mejor amiga 3:05
3. De pata negra 2:46
4. Papi, ¿qué me pasa a mí? 3:34
5. La ratita 3:50
6. Besos de cristal 3:20
7. La cuerda de su guitarra 3:11
8. Juego a ser mayor 2:54
9. Señora sociedad 5:07
10. Como canta la gallina 2:48
11. La calculadora antero, 3:22
12. Mío, mío 2:33

== Charts ==
=== Weekly charts ===
| Chart (2001–2002) | Peak position |
|---|---|
| European Albums (Music & Media) | 55 |
| Spain (AFYVE) | 2 |
| US Top Latin Albums (Billboard) | 27 |
| US Latin Pop Albums (Billboard) | 12 |

=== Year-end charts ===
| Chart (2002) | Peak position |
|---|---|
| Spain (AFYVE) | 21 |

== Certifications ==
| Region | Certification | Certified units/sales |
|---|---|---|
| Colombia (ASINCOL) | Platinum | 30,000 |
| Spain (Promusicae) | 2× Platinum | 200,000^{^} |
| United States (RIAA) | Platinum (Latin) | 100,000^{^} |
| Venezuela (AVINPRO) | Platinum | 100,000 |
Summaries
| Worldwide | — | 600,000 |
^{^} Shipments figures based on certification alone.

== Accolades ==
| Year | Nominee / work | Award | Result |
|---|---|---|---|
| 2002 | 3rd Latin Grammy Awards | Best Children's Album | Nominated |
| 2003 | 2003 Latin Billboard Music Awards | Latin Pop Album of the Year, New Artist | Nominated |
