= De pata negra (song) =

Single by Melody

from the album De pata negra
- Released: 2001
- Genre: Latin pop, rumba
- Label: Epic / Sony Music Entertainment Spain S.A.
- Songwriter: J.A. Benitez
- Producer: Gustavo Ramudo

Melody singles chronology
"El baile del gorila" (2001)	"De pata negra" (2001)	"Muévete" (2002)

Music video
- "De pata negra" on YouTube

"De pata negra" (which can be translated as "The Real McCoy") is a song by Spanish singer Melody. It was the second single taken from her debut album De pata negra and her second single overall. She released it in 2001, at the age of 10.

The song debuted at number 18 in Spain for the week of 15 September 2001, peaking at number 12 three weeks later.

== Track listing ==
Promo 7" single — Sony Music SAMPCS 10302 (Spain)
No.	Title	Length
1.	"De pata negra"
2.	"El baile del gorila" (Single Remix)

== Charts ==
Chart (2001–2002)	Peak position
Spain (Promusicae)	12
US Latin Pop Airplay (Billboard)	27
US Tropical Airplay (Billboard)	18
