= Aitor Albizua =

Spanish television presenter

- Born: Aitor Albizua Meabe; 8 January 1992 (age 34); Arrigorriaga, Basque Country, Spain
- Education: Complutense University of Madrid
- Occupations: Journalist, television presenter

Aitor Albizua Meabe (born 8 January 1992) is a Spanish journalist and television presenter of Basque descent.

== Biography ==
Raised in his native town of Arrigorriaga in the Bilbao metropolitan area, Albizua graduated in journalism at the Complutense University of Madrid. He began his professional career as an intern at Cadena SER, where he would spend eight years working in shows like Hora 25 and De buenas a primeras. Albizua later joined Basque media group EITB, where he hosted television programs like the magazine show Nos echamos a la calle and the quiz show Lingo, and conducted the 2021–2022 New Year's Eve special alongside Ane Ibarzabal. During his time in ETB, he also collaborated with Àngels Barceló at Cadena SER.

In 2022, Albizua was hired by Televisión Española (TVE) to host El comodín de La 1, the Spanish adaptation of the Turkish game show Joker. In January and February 2023, Albizua, alongside Miki Núñez, hosted La Noche del Benidorm Fest, the side show of the television song contest Benidorm Fest 2023. He would go on to host La noche del Benidorm for Benidorm Fest 2024 alongside Inés Hernand.

Since 2024, Albizua hosts the game show Cifras y letras, which returned to La 2. In 2025, he co-hosted daytime magazine show La familia de la tele.
