= Schiller discography =

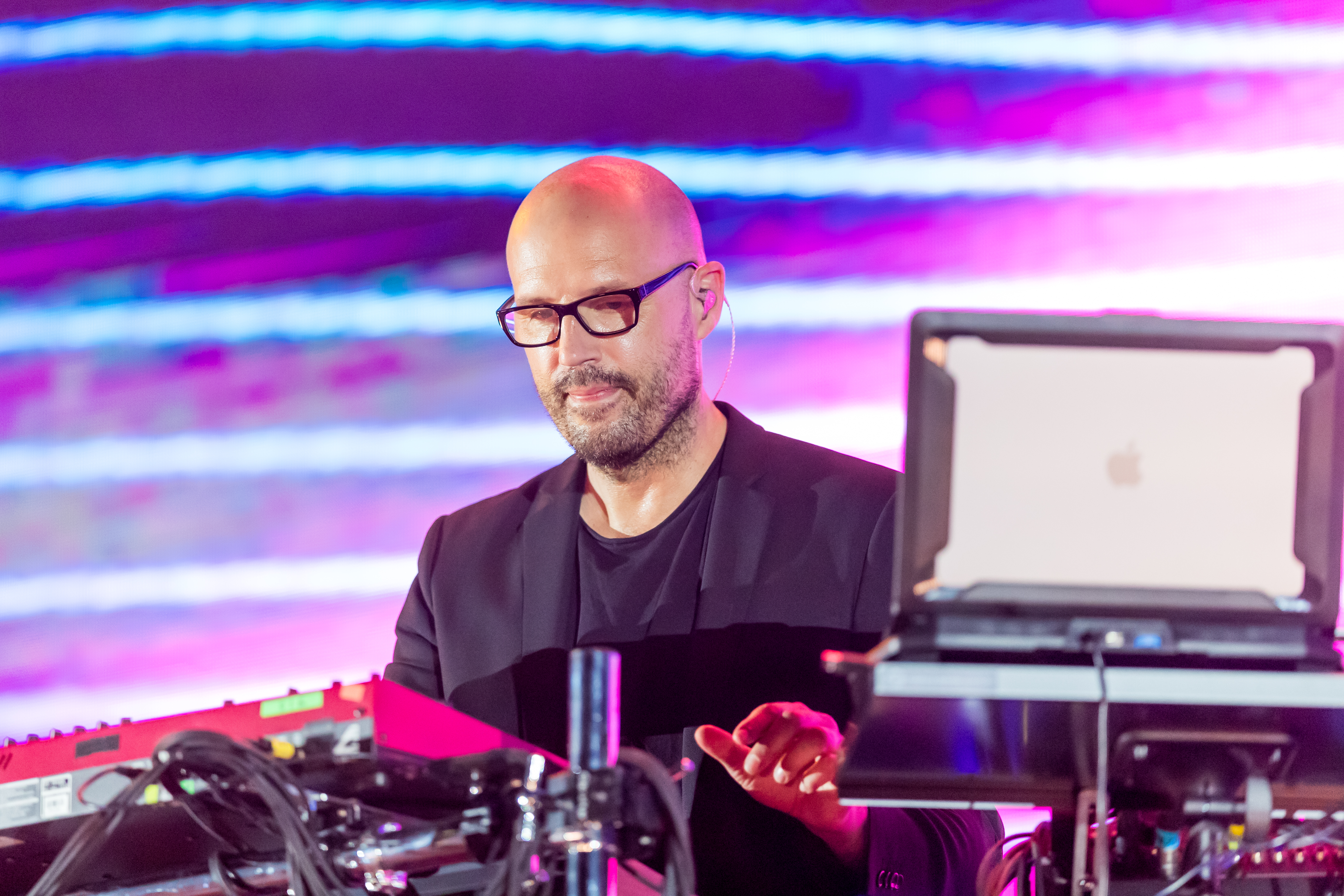
- Studio albums: 14
- Extended plays: 1
- Live albums: 6
- Singles: 18
- Video albums: 6
- Music videos: 61

This is a listing of releases by Schiller, a German music project. Schiller released their debut studio album Zeitgeist (Spirit of the Time) on 16 August 1999. Schiller has seven albums that have topped the charts in Germany, Weltreise (2001), Sehnsucht (2008), Sonne (2012), Opus (2013), Future (2016), Morgenstund (2019), Summer in Berlin (2021). 4 of Schiller's albums have been certified Platinum in Germany, with an additional five albums certified Gold.

The single "Sonne" with Unheilig holds the highest entry of all the singles on the German Singles Chart with a peak position of No.12. To this day, Schiller have had minor success in the English speaking world, charting at No.17 in the UK with the single "Das Glockenspiel" and No.5 on the U.S. Dance Chart with "Leben… I Feel You" with Heppner.

== Albums ==
=== Studio albums ===
Title	Album details	Peak chart positions					Certifications
Title	Album details	GER	AUT	GRE	POL	SWI	Certifications
Zeitgeist	Released: 16 August 1999; Label: Zeitgeist (Universal) (Germany); Formats: CD, Cassette, LP	22	—	—	—	—	
Weltreise Voyage	Released: 30 July 2001; Label: Zeitgeist (Universal) (Germany); Formats: CD, Cassette	1	—	—	—	26	GER: Platinum
Leben Life	Released: 13 October 2003; Label: Island (Universal) (Germany); Formats: CD, Cassette	7	—	—	26	59	GER: Platinum
Tag und Nacht Day and Night	Released: 28 October 2005; Label: Island (Universal) (Germany); Formats: CD, Cassette	5	—	—	—	58	
Sehnsucht Desire	Released: 22 February 2008; Label: Island (Universal) (Germany); Formats: CD, Cassette	1	25	—	28	21	GER: Platinum
Atemlos Breathless	Released: 12 March 2010; Label: Island (Universal) (Germany); Formats: CD, digital download	2	29	3	37	15	GER: Platinum
Lichtblick EP	Released: 26 November 2010; Label: Island (Universal) (Germany); Formats: CD, digital download	16	—	—	—	—	
Sonne Sun	Released: 5 October 2012; Label: Island (Universal) (Germany); Formats: CD, digital download	1	30	—	—	13	GER: Gold
Opus	Released: 30 August 2013; Label: Panorama (Deutsche Grammophon) (Germany); Formats: CD, digital download	1	10	—	27	6	GER: Gold
Future	Released: 26 February 2016; Label: Island (Universal Music) (Germany); Formats: CD, digital download	1	20	—	—	14	
Morgenstund	Released: 22 March 2019; Label: RCA Deutschland (Sony Music Entertainment) (Germany); Formats: CD, digital download	1	10	—	—	5	
Summer in Berlin	Release: 12 February 2021; Label: Formats: CD, digital download	1	11	—	—	11	
Epic	Release: 29 October 2021; Label: Formats: CD, digital download	3	13	—	—	10	
Illuminate	Released: 10 March 2023; Label: Formats: CD, digital download	1	7	—	—	7	
Euphoria	Released: 16 January 2026; Label: Sony Classical; Formats: CD, digital download	1	11	—	—	4	
"—" denotes releases that did not chart or were not released.

=== Live albums ===
Title	Album details	Peak chart positions
Title	Album details	GER
Live ErLeben	Released: 1 November 2004; Label: Island (Universal) (Germany); Formats: CD, Cassette	45
Tagtraum	Released: 17 November 2006; Label: Island (Universal) (Germany); Formats: CD	22
Sehnsucht Live	Released: 14 November 2008; Label: Island (Universal) (Germany); Formats: CD	—
Atemlos Live	Released: 12 March 2010; Label: Island (Universal) (Germany); Formats: CD	—
Sonne Live	Released: 22 March 2013; Label: Universal Music (Germany); Formats: CD	—
Symphonia	Release: 17 October 2014; Label: We Love Music (Universal Music) (Germany); Formats: CD	4
Zeitreise Live	Release: 16 December 2016; Label: Formats: CD, LP, Digital	—
"—" denotes releases that did not chart or were not released.

=== Compilation albums ===
- A Future for the Michel (2005)
- Timeline (2012)
- Zeitreise (2016)

=== Other releases ===
- Prologue (2005)

==== Bonus CDs ====
- Atemlose Klangwelten (2010), bonus CD on Atemlos
- Sonnenwelten (2012), bonus CD on Sonne
- Horizon (2013), bonus CD on Opus
- Tal des Himmels (2016), bonus CD on Future
- Wanderlust (2019), bonus CD on Morgenstund

==== Einlassmusik ====
CDs created for the live tours.

- Die Einlassmusik 1 (2004)
- Die Einlassmusik 2 (2004)
- Die Einlassmusik 3 (2006)
- Die Einlassmusik 4 (2008)
- Die Einlassmusik 5 (2008)
- Die Einlassmusik 6 (2010)
- Die Einlassmusik 7 (2011)
- Die Einlassmusik 8 (2012)
- Die Einlassmusik 9 (2012)
- Die Einlassmusik 10 (2013)
- Die Einlassmusik 11 (2016)
- Die Einlassmusik 12 (2016)
- Die Einlassmusik 13 (2017)
- Die Einlassmusik 14 (2017)
- Die Einlassmusik 15 (2019)
- Die Einlassmusik 16 (2019)
- Die Einlassmusik 17 (2019)

== Singles ==
Title	Year	Peak chart positions				Album
Title	Year	GER	AUT	SWI	UK	Album
"Das Glockenspiel"	1998	21	—	38	17	Zeitgeist
"Liebesschmerz"	1999	24	—	—	—	Zeitgeist
"Ruhe (song)"	1999	24	—	69	—	Zeitgeist
"Ein schöner Tag" (with Isgaard)	2000	40	—	91	—	Weltreise
"Dream of You" (with Heppner)	2001	13	49	78	—	Weltreise
"Dancing with Loneliness" (with Kim Sanders)	2001	73	—	—	—	Weltreise
"Liebe" (with Mila Mar)	2003	34	—	—	—	Leben
"Leben… I Feel You" (with Heppner)	2004	15	—	—	—	Leben
"Die Nacht… Du bist nicht allein" (with Thomas D.)	2005	24	—	80	—	Tag und Nacht
"Der Tag… Du bist erwacht" (with Jette von Roth)	2006	43	—	—	—	Tag und Nacht
"Let Me Love You" (with Kim Sanders)	2008	63	—	—	—	Sehnsucht
"Time for Dreams" (with Lang Lang)	2008	19	—	—	—	Sehnsucht
"You" (with Colbie Caillat)	2008	19	64	—	—	Sehnsucht
"Try" (with Nadia Ali)	2010	58	—	—	—	Atemlos
"I Will Follow You" (with Hen Ree)	2010	—	—	—	—	Atemlos
"Always You / Innocent Lies" (with Anggun)	2010	—	—	—	—	Atemlos
"Sonne" (with Unheilig)	2012	12	—	—	—	Sonne
"Lichtermeer" / "Sleepless"	2013	47	—	—	—	Sonne
"Paradise" (with Arlissa)	2016	—	—	—	—	Future
"—" denotes releases that did not chart or were not released.

== Other charted songs ==
Title	Year	Peak chart positions	Album
Title	Year	GER	Album
"Swan Lake"	2013	57	Opus

== Videography ==
=== Video albums ===
- 2001: Weltreise - Die DVD
- 2004: Leben - Die DVD
- 2004: Live ErLeben
- 2006: Tagtraum
- 2008: Sehnsucht Live
- 2010: Lichtblick

=== Music videos ===
1. Das Glockenspiel (1998)
2. Liebesschmerz (1999)
3. Ruhe (1999)
4. Ein schöner Tag (2000)
5. Dream of You (2001)
6. Dancing with Loneliness (2001)
7. Liebe (2003)
8. Leben... I Feel You (2004)
9. Die Nacht... Du bist nicht allein (2005)
10. Der Tag... Du bist erwacht (2006)
11. Lichter (2006)
12. Drifting and Dreaming (2006)
13. Sun Meets Moon (2006)
14. Tagtraum (2006)
15. Das Meer (2006)
16. Der Tag... Du bist erwacht (Orchesterversion) (2006)
17. I Miss You (2006)
18. Sehnsucht (2008)
19. Denn wer liebt (2008)
20. Herzschlag (2008)
21. Wunschtraum (2008)
22. Let Me Love You (Album version) (2008)
23. Everything (2008)
24. Mitternacht (2008)
25. Sommernacht (2008)
26. In der Weite (2008)
27. Wehmut (2008)
28. Forever (2008)
29. Let Me Love You (TV version) (2008)
30. Time for Dreams (2008)
31. You (2008)
32. White (2008)
33. Ile aye (2008)
34. Breathe (Dave Ramone Radio Edit) (2009)
35. Try (2010)
36. I Will Follow You (2010)
37. Always You (Version "Paris") (2010)
38. Always You (Version "Suite 211") (2010)
39. Solaris (2012)
40. Sonne (Alternative video) (2012)
41. Sonne (2012)
42. Sahara Avenue (2012)
43. Lichtermeer / Sleepless (2013)
44. Swan Lake (2013)
45. The Future I + II (2015)
46. Paradise (2016)
47. The Wait is Over (2016)
48. Once Upon a Time (2016)
49. Not in Love (2016)
50. Universe (2019)
51. Das Goldene Tor (2019)
52. Berlin Tehran (2019)
53. New Day (2019)
54. Avalanche (2019)
55. Avalanche 2020 (2020)
56. Playing with Madness 2020 (2020)
57. Dreamforest (2020)
58. Der goldene Engel (2020)
59. Miracle (2020)
60. Metropolis (2021)
61. Summer in Berlin (2021)

== Mixes / remixes ==
- 1999 Sunbeam - Outside World [Schiller Remix]
- 1999 Supanova - Don't Break My Heart [Schiller Vocal Remix] & [Schiller Instrumental Remix]
- 1999 Trance Allstars - The First Rebirth [Schiller Club Mix] & [Schiller Edit]
- 2000 Trance Allstars - Ready To Flow [Schiller Club Mix] & [Schiller Edit]
- 2000 Tyrell Corp - Running 2.0 [Schiller Remix]
- 2000 U 96 - Das Boot 2001 [Schiller Remix]
- 2002 Apoptygma Berzerk - Until The End Of The World [Schiller Remix]
- 2002 ATB - Let U Go [Schiller Remix]
- 2002 Gregorian (band) feat. Sarah Brightman - Join Me [Schill Out Version by Schiller]
- 2002 Sinéad O'Connor - Troy [Schiller Airplay Edit], [Schill Out Remix], & [Schiller Club Mix]
- 2002 Trance Allstars - Lost In Love [Schiller Mix] & [Schiller Radio Mix]
- 2003 Mesh (band) - Friends Like These [Schiller Remix]
- 2003 Moya Brennan - Show Me [Schiller Edit] & [Schiller X/Tended Remix]
- 2004 Marianne Rosenberg - Er gehört zu mir [Schiller Remix]
- 2004 Mila Mar - Sense Of Being [Chill Out Remix by Schiller]
- 2004 Rammstein - Ohne Dich [Schiller Remix]
- 2008 Bernstein - Paradies [Schiller Remix]
- 2008 Klaus Schulze und Lisa Gerrard - Liquid Coincidence 2 [Schiller Remix]
- 2004 Polarkreis 18 - Allein Allein [Schiller Remix]
- 2011 Andrea Corr - Pale Blue Eyes [Schiller Remix]
- 2014 Udo Jürgens – Ich weiß, was ich will [Schiller Remix]
- 2016 Hélène Grimaud - Debussy: Préludes, L.117 (Live) [Schiller Remix] & [Schiller Remix Radio Edit]
