= Leben... I Feel You =

Single by Schiller with Heppner

from the album Leben
- Released: 1 October 2003
- Recorded: 2003
- Genre: Vocal trance
- Songwriter(s): Christopher von Deylen, Peter Heppner

Schiller singles chronology
"Dancing with Loneliness" (2001)	"Leben... I Feel You" (2003)	"Die Nacht... Du bist nicht allein" (2005)

"Leben... I Feel You" is the second single from the 2003 Schiller album Leben with vocals by Peter Heppner. The song was officially released on 1 October 2003 and peaked at number 15 in the German singles chart and at number 1 in the Romanian singles chart in 2004. It is the second co-operation between Schiller and the German singer Heppner after the song "Dream of You". The single and music video version differs slightly from the album version; the video version has a length of 3:49 minutes and the album version has a length of 5:35 minutes. The single includes the song ″Vielklang″, which was not released on any album.

The single was released in two versions, purple and green with different songs. The cover art work shows a graphic of a tree, which represents one of the four elements, earth. The complete four elements are shown on the art work of the album Leben. "Leben... I Feel You" was also released on the soundtrack of the 2003 German movie Soundless.

== Track listing ==
=== Version 1 ===
Single with purple cover.

No.	Title	Length
1.	"Leben... I Feel You (Fernsehfassung)"	3:49
2.	"Leben... I Feel You (Schill Out Version)"	4:02
3.	"Vielklang (Bonus Track)"	3:21
4.	"Einklang (Album Version)"	4:41
5.	"Leben... I Feel You (Live in Berlin)"	5:42

=== Version 2 ===
Single with green cover.

No.	Title	Length
1.	"Leben... I Feel You (Fernsehfassung)"	3:40
2.	"Leben... I Feel You (Sonos Ghost of the Past Mix)"	6:45
3.	"Leben... I Feel You (Humate Remix)"	7:39
4.	"Leben... I Feel You (Mellow Trax Remix)"	5:58

== Music video ==
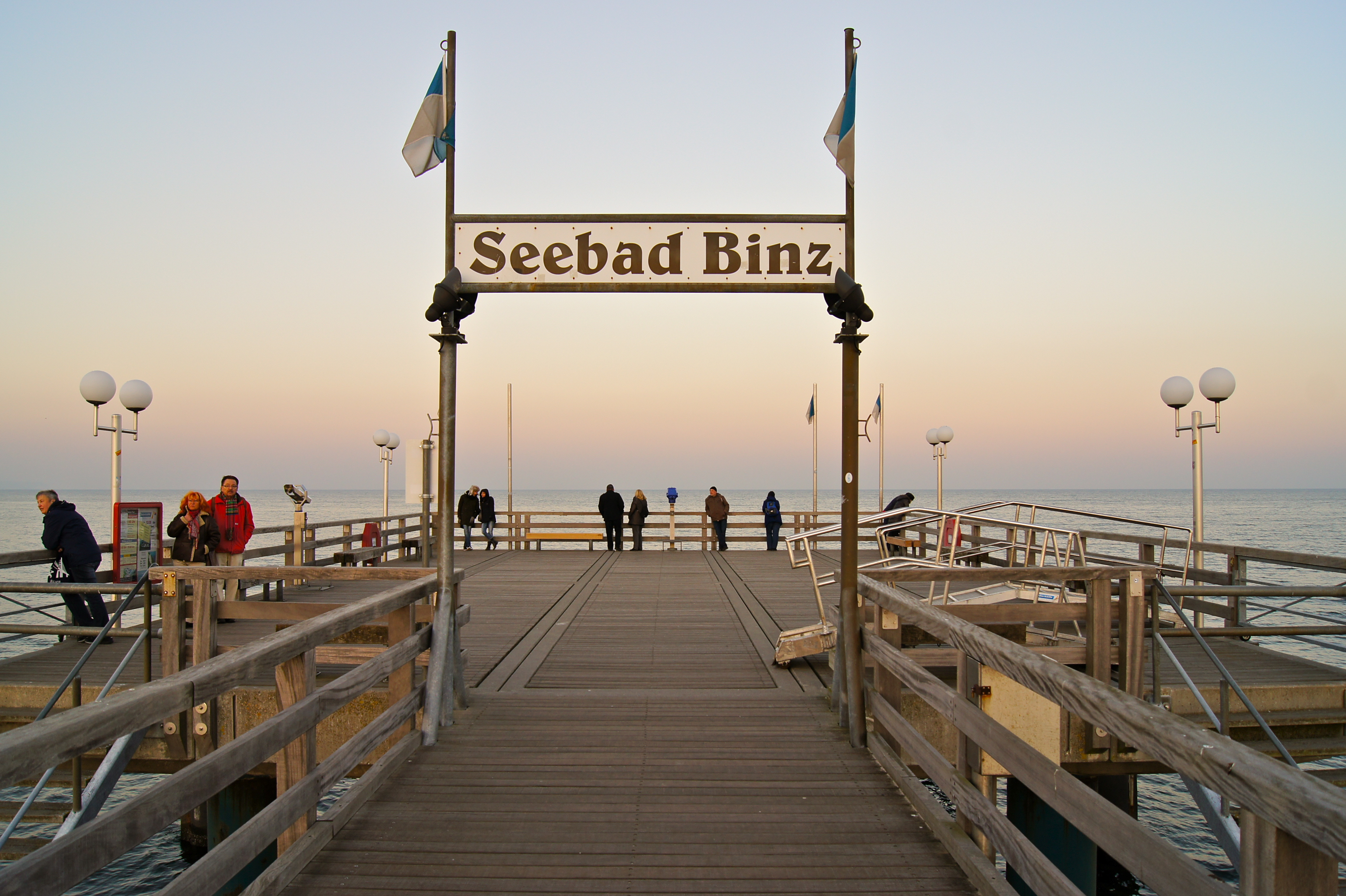
The pier in Binz on Rügen was one of the locations of the music video. The words "Seebad Binz" were replaced by the word "Leben".

The music video for "Leben... I Feel You" was produced by Luminus Film and was shot in late 2003 on the German island of Rügen by the German director Hans Hammers Jr. II. It has a length of 3:48 minutes. The cinematographer for the video shot was Ben Wolf. The video shows Peter Heppner riding through the island on a black bicycle, and an unknown woman. The video was shot at different locations such as the seaside resort Binz, the Jasmund National Park chalk cliffs and the building complex of Prora. At the pier in Binz the words "Seebad Binz" were replaced virtually by the word "Leben" (life).

Other crew members were Carsten Pieck (first assistant camera), Christian Prüß (unit manager) and Florian Buba (producer).

In 2022 the music video had 27 million views on the official Schiller channel on YouTube.

== Live performances ==
The song was performed live at Schiller's 2004 ″Er-Leben-Tour″ together with Peter Heppner. During this tour there was made a recording of this song and was released on the 2004 live album Live Erleben and on DVD. Another performance with Heppner was made during Schillers 2006 ″Tag und Nacht″ tour, which was also recorded and released on the 2006 live album Tagtraum and on DVD.

In 2014 Schiller performed this song at his open air concert ″SCHILLER meets CLASSIC″ in Berlin without vocals in a renewed orchestral version with a length of 2:10 minutes. This version was recorded and released on the live album Symphonia and on video.

At his live performance in Bucharest in 2019 Leben was played as an instrumental song.

Artists Aly & Fila performed their remix of Leben at the Transmission Prague 2021.

== Charts ==
Chart (2003 - 2004)	Peak position
Germany (Media Control AG)	15
Poland (Airplay Charts)	1
Romania (Airplay Charts)	1

== Remixes ==
- 2003 DIY − "Leben... I Feel You (DIY Extended Remix)"
- 2003: DIY − "Leben... I Feel You (DIY Radio Edit)"
- 2003: Humate − "Leben... I Feel You (Humate Remix)"
- 2003: Mellow Trax − "Leben... I Feel You (Mellow Trax Remix)"
- 2003: Schiller − "Leben... I Feel You (Chill Out Version)"
- 2003: SONO − "Leben... I Feel You (Sono’s Ghost of the Past Mix)"
- 2005: Felipe Inoa − "Leben... I Feel You (Felipe Inoa’s Feelin U Mix)"
- 2005: Marco Zappala − "Leben... I Feel You (Marco Zappala Club Mix)"
- 2005: Funky Junction & Anthony Reale − "Leben... I Feel You (Funky Junction & Anthony Reale Electro Dub)"
- 2005: Funky Junction & Anthony Reale − "Leben... I Feel You (Funky Junction & Anthony Reale Main Room Mix)"
- 2005: Funky Junction & Splashfunk − "Leben... I Feel You (Splashfunk & Funky Junction Sheeva Turbolenza Mix)"
- 2023: Aly & Fila - "Leben ... I Feel You (Aly & Fila Remix)"

== See also ==
- List of Romanian Top 100 number ones of the 2000s
