= Ein schöner Tag =

2000 song performed by Schiller

Single by Schiller

from the album Weltreise
- Released: 5 September 2000
- Genre: Electronica
- Label: Zeitgeist (Universal Music)
- Songwriters: Christopher von Deylen, Mirko von Schlieffen
- Producers: Christopher von Deylen, Mirko von Schlieffen

Schiller singles chronology
"Ruhe" (1999)	"Ein schöner Tag" (2000)	"Dream of You" (2001)

Ein schöner Tag (English: A beautiful day) is the first single from Schiller's 2001 album Weltreise with vocals by German singer Isgaard and spoken word passages by German actress and voice actress Franziska Pigulla (* 6 May 1965), who became famous in the German-speaking countries as a narrator of countless documentaries and as the voice of FBI Special Agent Dana Scully from The X-Files. The song is titled internationally as "A Beautiful Day". The trance music single was officially released on 5 September 2000 in Germany and was peaking at number 40 on German Singles Chart in 2000 and at number 91 in Switzerland. The cover art work shows a graphic of the sun.

The styles of the song and of the music video of Ein schöner Tag are very close to the previous single Ruhe. The vocals by Isgaard are a sample of the theme "Un bel dì vedremo" from the opera "Madame Butterfly" by Giacomo Puccini. The spoken words by Pigulla are:

Ein schöner Tag - wenn er zu Ende geht, ist nichts mehr, wie es war.

Translation from German: "A beautiful day - when it comes to an end, nothing is as it was."

In 2003 English soprano Sarah Brightman released a cover version of "A Beautiful Day" on her album Harem as "It's a Beautiful Day". In 2014 Schiller released a new version of the song called Un Bel Di / Ein schöner Tag. It features vocals by the Russian singer Eva Mali and the London Symphony Orchestra. The song will be included on Opus - White Album and had its premiere in the Schiller Lounge on German Klassik Radio.

== Track listing ==
=== Maxi single ===
No.	Title	Length
1.	"Ein schöner Tag (Fernseh-Fassung)"	3:45
2.	"Ein schöner Tag (Langspiel-Fassung)"	7:09
3.	"Ein schöner Tag (KayCee Mischung)"	9:19
4.	"Ein schöner Tag (Da Hool Mischung)"	7:23
5.	"Ein schöner Tag (Gerret Frerichs Mischung)"	8:32
6.	"Ein schöner Tag (Free Schiller Mischung)"	8:38

=== Vinyl ===
No.	Title	Length
1.	"Ein schöner Tag (Langspiel-Fassung)"	7:09
2.	"Ein schöner Tag (Kaycee Mischung)"	9:19

== Credits and personnel ==
- Composed and produced by Christopher von Deylen and Mirko von Schlieffen
- Vocals by Isgaard
- Voice by Franziska Pigulla
- Recorded and mixed at the Sleepingroom in Hamburg
- Voice recorded by Stefan Knauthe at the Kokon Studio in Berlin

== Music video ==
The official music video for "Ein schöner Tag" was produced by Blau Medien GmbH and was shot in 2000 by German director Marcus Sternberg. The director of photography was Gero Steffen and the unit manager was Oliver Schertlein. It has a length of 3:45 minutes. The video features some people of Asian origin in a Japanese garden and fighters in a forest. The video was aired and was shown for example on German music television channel VIVA in 2000.

== Charts ==
Chart (2000)	Peak position
Germany (Media Control AG)	40
Switzerland	91

== Sarah Brightman version ==
English Soprano Sarah Brightman released her cover of "A Beautiful Day" on her album Harem in 2003 with the title "It's a Beautiful Day".

Credits:

- Backing vocals by Frank Peterson
- Narrator: Chiara Ferraú
- Sitar by Peter Weihe
- Tabla by Kuljid Bhamra
