= Leben =

Leben may refer to:

== People ==
- Leben (surname)

== Places ==
- Leben (Crete), a town of ancient Crete, Greece

== Music ==
- Leben (Schiller album), 2003 studio album by German musician Christopher von Deylen
  - Leben… I Feel You, second single from the album
- de:Leben (Album) by Azad (rapper)
- "Leben", 1982 song by Katja Ebstein

== Other uses ==
- Leben (milk product), a food or beverage of fermented milk
