= Dancing with Loneliness =

Single by Schiller with Kim Sanders

from the album Weltreise
- Released: 26 November 2001
- Genre: Electronica
- Label: Zeitgeist (Universal Music)
- Songwriters: Christopher von Deylen, Mirko von Schlieffen, Kim Sanders
- Producers: Christopher von Deylen, Mirko von Schlieffen

Schiller singles chronology
"Dream of You" (2001)	"Dancing with Loneliness" (2001)	"Leben… I Feel You" (2003)

Dancing with Loneliness is the third single from the 2001 Schiller gold album Weltreise with vocals by singer Kim Sanders. The single was officially released on 26 November 2001 and peaked at number 73 on the German Singles Chart in 2001. The single includes the song ″Wehmut″. The single was released in two versions: A green one and a blue one with different songs. The cover art work shows a graphic of a teardrop. The music video was shot in Italy.

The live version of the song Schiller was recorded on 19 September 2001 during a concert for the television show "2nite" on the German-French TV channel Arte.

== Track listing ==
=== Maxi single ===
==== Version 1 ====
Single with green cover.

No.	Title	Length
1.	"Dancing with Loneliness (Fernseh-Fassung)"	3:27
2.	"Dancing with Loneliness (Sono's Fairground Mix)"	9:27
3.	"Dancing with Loneliness (York Remix)"	10:15
4.	"Wehmut (Bonus-Titel)"	5:20

==== Version 2 ====
Single with light blue cover.

No.	Title	Length
1.	"Dancing with Loneliness (Schill-Out Fassung)"	9:30
2.	"Schiller (Live Version)"	6:20

=== Vinyl ===
No.	Title	Length
1.	"Dancing with Loneliness (York Remix)"	10:15
2.	"Das Glockenspiel (Schill-Out Fassung)"	5:33

== Credits ==
- Producer: Christopher von Deylen, Mirko von Schlieffen
- Recorded by Christopher von Deylen, Mirko von Schlieffen
- Vocals by Kim Sanders
- Bass Guitar and Electric Guitar by Tissy Thiers
- Recorded and mixed at Sleepingroom in Hamburg
- Artwork by Katja Stier

== Music video ==
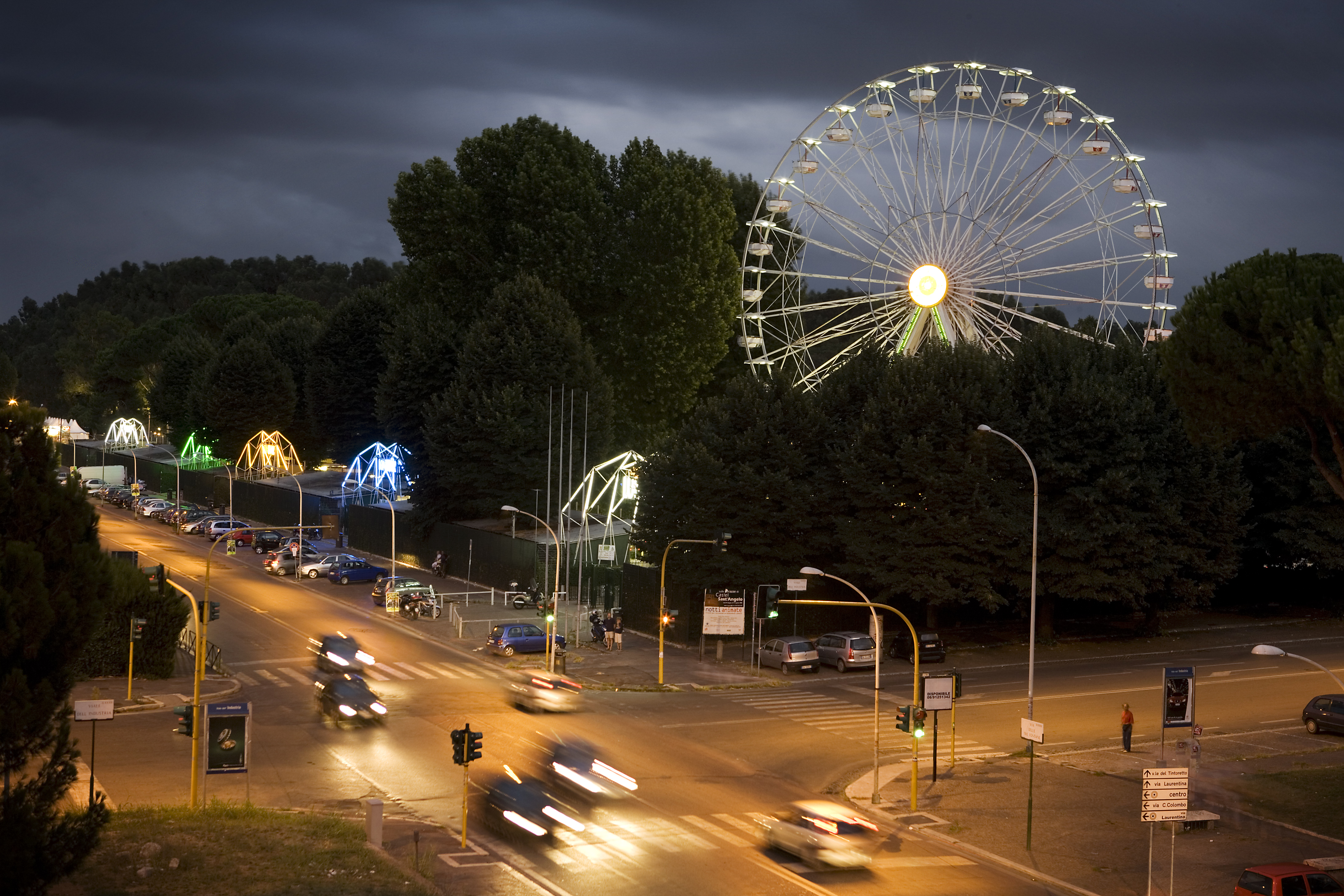
The location of the video shot: The fun fair LunEur in Rome

The official music video for "Dancing with Loneliness" was produced by Blau Medien GmbH and was shot in 2001 in Italy by German director Marcus Sternberg. It has a length of 3:33 minutes. The video features Kim Sanders and different unknown people in an amusement park. According to the lyrics, everybody of these persons are shown alone in empty amusement rides and some of them are dancing alone. This video makes a complete contrast to the daily business on amusement parks, which are usually full of people. In one scene the name of the "Labirinto di Cristallo" is shown. The music video was shot in the amusement park LunEur in the district EUR in Rome, Italy. It was first aired in September 2001.

Other crew members:

- Director of photography: Felix Storp
- Editor: Kai Kniepkamp
- Producer: Stephan Pauly

== Charts ==
Chart (2001)	Peak position
Germany (Media Control AG)	73
