= Weltreise =

Studio album by Schiller
- Released: 30 July 2001
- Recorded: 2000–2001
- Genre: Synthpop, trance
- Length: 74:19
- Label: Universal / Zeitgeist - Polydor Zeitgeist
- Producer: Christopher von Deylen, Mirko Von Schlieffen

Schiller chronology
Zeitgeist (1999)	Weltreise (2001)	Leben (2003)

Singles from Weltreise
- 1. "Ein schöner Tag (UK: A Beautiful Day)" Released: 5 September 2000; 2. "Dream of You (with Heppner)" Released: 11 June 2001; 3. "Dancing with Loneliness (with Kim Sanders)" Released: 26 November 2001

Weltreise (The World Trip) is the second studio album by German electronical project Schiller by Christopher von Deylen and Mirko von Schlieffen. The album was internationally marketed as Voyage. It became a surprise hit, staying on the top position of the German longplay charts for four consecutive weeks. The album featured Kim Sanders and Peter Heppner as guest singers, with voice actors Otto Sander, Benjamin Völz and Franziska Pigulla adding spoken words passages.

Weltreise was also released as a DVD including a travel movie to the soundtrack.

The album achieved platinum status in Germany in 2016.

== Track listing ==
No.	Title	Writer(s)	Length
1.	"Der Anfang (UK: The Beginning)" (Spoken words: Franziska Pigulla)	Von Deylen, Von Schlieffen	1:43
2.	"Distance" (With Kim Sanders)	Kim Sanders, Von Deylen, Von Schlieffen	6:56
3.	"Dream of You" (With Heppner, Backing Vocal: Isgaard)	Von Deylen, Von Schlieffen, Peter Heppner	4:00
4.	"Schiller"	Von Deylen, Von Schlieffen	7:07
5.	"Ein schöner Tag (UK: A Beautiful Day)" (Vocal: Isgaard, Spoken Words: Franziska Pigulla)	Von Deylen, Von Schlieffen	3:51
6.	"Träume (UK: Dreams)" (Spoken Words: Benjamin Völz)	Von Deylen, Von Schlieffen	5:29
7.	"Der Aufbruch (UK: Nocturne)" (First violin and Orchestral Arrangement: Stefan Pintev)	Music: Rolf Lovland, Text: Petter Skavlan	2:02
8.	"Fernweh (UK: Wanderlust)"	Von Deylen, Von Schlieffen	4:55
9.	"Der Prophet (with Otto Sander) (UK: The Prophet)" (With Otto Sander)	Khalil Gibran, Von Deylen, Von Schlieffen	1:14
10.	"Dancing with Loneliness" (With Kim Sanders), (Electronical Guitar & Bass: Tissy Thiers)	Kim Sanders, Von Deylen, Von Schlieffen	4:47
11.	"Heimweh (UK: Homesick)"	Von Deylen, Von Schlieffen	4:41
12.	"Strandmusik (UK: Beach Music)" (Acoustic Guitar and Electrical Bass: Tissy Thiers)	Von Deylen, Von Schlieffen	5:15
13.	"Zaubergarten (UK: Magic Garden)"	Von Deylen, Von Schlieffen	5:11
14.	"Destiny"	Von Deylen, Von Schlieffen	4:21
15.	"Einsamkeit (UK: Solitude)" (Spoken words: Franziska Pigulla)	Von Deylen, Von Schlieffen	4:42
16.	"Expedition"	Von Deylen, Von Schlieffen	3:54
17.	"Weltreise (UK: Voyage)" (Spoken words: Franziska Pigulla)	Von Deylen, Von Schlieffen	2:42
18.	"Das Ende (UK: The End)" (Spoken words: Franziska Pigulla)	Von Deylen, Von Schlieffen	1:18

== Charts ==
=== Weekly charts ===
Chart (2001)	Peak position
German Albums (Offizielle Top 100)	1
Swiss Albums (Schweizer Hitparade)	26

=== Year-end charts ===
Chart (2001)	Position
German Albums (Offizielle Top 100)	41
