= You (Schiller song) =

Single by Schiller featuring Colbie Caillat

from the album Sehnsucht
- Released: 31 October 2008
- Recorded: 2008
- Genre: Electropop
- Label: Island
- Songwriters: Christopher von Deylen; Colbie Caillat

Schiller singles chronology
"Time for Dreams" (2008)	"You" (2008)	"Try" (2010)

Colbie Caillat singles chronology
"Midnight Bottle" (2008)	"You" (2008)	"Lucky" (2008)

"You" is a song by the German band Schiller from the re-release of their album Sehnsucht featuring vocals by American singer Colbie Caillat. The song was officially released in October 2008 and was peaking at number 19 on German singles chart in 2008.

== Background ==
The song was written in July 2008 in the US by Christopher von Deylen (Schiller) and Colbie Caillat.

== Music video ==
The music video for "You" was shot on 25 August 2008 in Los Angeles at the shore of the Pacific Ocean by German director Marcus Sternberg. It made its world premiere on 3 October 2008 on the German music TV station Viva.

The video features Christopher von Deylen, Colbie Caillat and others. In the video, Caillat is shown in front of a car and ram-air inflatable single-line kites in the shape of octopuses and under and on a pier.

== Track listing ==
1. "You"
2. "Zeit der Sehnsucht"

== Charts ==
Chart (2008)	Peak position
Austria	64
Germany (Media Control AG)	19
