= Live Erleben =

Live album by Schiller
- Released: 1 November 2004
- Recorded: 2004
- Genre: Synthpop, trance
- Label: Universal / Polydor Island
- Producer: Christopher von Deylen

Schiller chronology
Leben (2003)	Live Erleben (2004)	Tag und Nacht (2005)

Live Erleben (Live Experience) is the first live album from German electronic musician, composer and producer Christopher von Deylen under his Schiller alias. The CD features several live versions of the tracks found on the 2003 Schiller album Leben / Life. Recorded live at the Schiller 'Er-Leben-Tour' 2004, 22 April 2004, Phillipshalle Düsseldorf (Germany). It's also available as a DVD version.

Schiller used a daf which is one of the most powerful Persian percussive instruments on this album. The daf appeared on the song The Smile (ft Sarah Brightman).

The album achieved gold status in Germany in 2016.

== Track listing ==
No.	Title	Length
1.	"Willkommen (UK: Welcome)"	1:13
2.	"Schiller"	6:07
3.	"Zukunft (UK: Future)"	4:47
4.	"Liebe (UK: Love)" (With Mila Mar)	3:57
5.	"Sommerregen (UK: Summer Rain)"	4:26
6.	"Einklang (UK: Accord / Harmony)"	4:40
7.	"Delicately Yours" (With Kim Sanders)	5:03
8.	"Distance" (With Kim Sanders)	6:54
9.	"The Smile" (With Sarah Brightman)	5:28
10.	"Dream of You" (With Heppner)	4:51
11.	"Leben...I Feel You" (With Heppner)	5:40
12.	"I've Seen It All" (With Kim Sanders)	6:55
