= Dream of You (Schiller song) =

2001 single by Schiller

Single by Schiller with Heppner

from the album Weltreise
- Released: 11 June 2001
- Genre: Vocal trance
- Length: 3:41
- Songwriters: Christopher von Deylen, Mirko von Schlieffen, Peter Heppner

Schiller singles chronology
"Ein schöner Tag" (2000)	"Dream of You" (2001)	"Dancing with Loneliness" (2001)

Dream of You is the second single from the 2001 Schiller gold album Weltreise with vocals by Peter Heppner and backing vocals by Isgaard. The song was officially released on 11 June 2001 and peaked at number 13 on the German singles charts in 2001.

Dream of You won the German music award Echo in the category "Dance Single des Jahres national" (National dance single of the year) in 2002.

== Track listing ==
=== Version 1 ===
Single with blue cover.

No.	Title	Length
1.	"Dream of You (Fernseh-Fassung)"	3:58
2.	"Dream of You (Langspiel-Fassung)"	7:46
3.	"Dream of You (Free Schiller mix)"	9:40
4.	"Dream of You (Tomcraft mix)"	7:45
5.	"Dream of You (Ayla mix)"	8:41

=== Version 2 ===
Single with white cover.

No.	Title	Length
1.	"Dream of You (Chillout mix)"	11:05
2.	"Strandmusik"	5:30

== Music video ==
The music video for "Dream of You" was produced by Blau Medien GmbH and was shot in 2001 in Barcelona by German director Marcus Sternberg. The cinematographer of the video shot was Felix Storp. The video features Peter Heppner and others and shows mostly scenes from a beach.

== Charts ==
Chart (2001)	Peak position
Austria	49
Germany (Media Control AG)	13
Italy (FIMI)	31
Poland (Polish Airplay Charts)	29
Switzerland	78
