= Sonne (Schiller song) =

Single by Schiller with Unheilig

from the album Sonne
- Released: 21 September 2012
- Genre: Electronica
- Label: Island Records (Universal Music)
- Songwriter(s): Christopher von Deylen, Der Graf
- Producer(s): Christopher von Deylen

Schiller singles chronology
"I Will Follow You" (2010)	"Sonne" (2012)	"Lichtermeer (Sleepless)" (2013)

"Sonne" (English: Sun) is the first single from the 2012 Schiller album Sonne with German band Unheilig and vocals by Unheilig singer Bernd Heinrich Graf (Der Graf). The single was officially released on 21 September 2012, peaking at number 12 in the German singles chart in 2012. To this day, it's the highest entry of Schiller in the German Singles Chart. The single includes the song ″Klangwelten″. The cover art work shows a graphic of the sun. The music video was shot in Spain.

== Track listing ==
=== Maxi single ===
No.	Title	Length
1.	"Sonne (Video Version)"	4:30
2.	"Klangwelten (Album Version)"	4:19

=== Download single ===
No.	Title	Length
1.	"Sonne (Video Version)"	4:27
2.	"Sonne (Instrumental)"	4:27
3.	"Sonne (Schill Out Version)"	5:21
4.	"Sonne (Schill Out Instrumental)"	5:20
5.	"Klangwelten (Album Version)"	4:19

== Credits ==
- Music written by Christopher von Deylen
- Lyrics written by Der Graf

== Music video ==
=== Alternative video ===
The alternative video was made of sun images made by Schiller fans from all over the world. It was released some days before the official music video was released.

=== Official music video ===
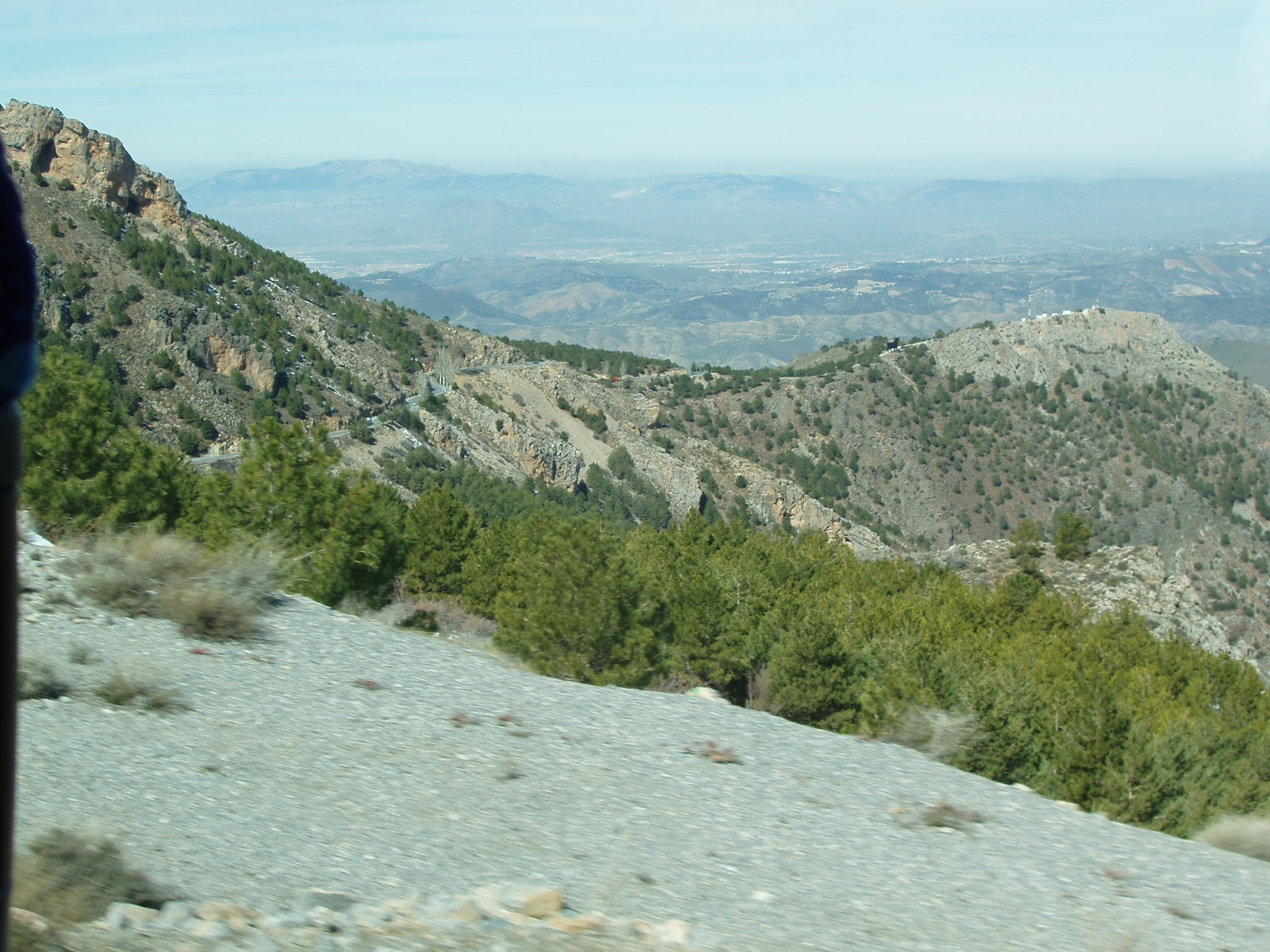
The location of the video shot: The Sierra Nevada in Spain

The official music video for "Sonne" was produced by AVA Studios GmbH and was shot in 2012 in Spain by German director Oliver Sommer. Director of photography was Francisco Domínguez. Digital film compositor was Danny Winter. It has a length of 4:27 minutes. The video features an unknown Spanish woman and a Spanish man. Even though Christopher von Deylen took part in the video shot, he and Der Graf were placed virtually into the music video by being shown on television screens placed in the desert. The music video was shot in the desert of Tabernas (Almería, Spain) in the south of Spain.

== Charts ==
Chart (2012)	Peak position
Germany (Media Control AG)	12
