= Symphonia (Schiller album) =

Live album by Schiller
- Released: 17 October 2014
- Recorded: 2014
- Genre: Electronica, Ambient, Synthpop
- Label: We Love Music (Universal Music)
- Producer: Christopher von Deylen

Schiller chronology
Opus (2013)	Symphonia (2014)	Future (2016)

Symphonia is a live album of the music project Schiller, created by the German electronic musician Christopher von Deylen. The album was released on October 17, 2014. The album is a live recording of the ″SCHILLER meets CLASSIC″ open air concert with the Berlin Symphonic Pop Orchestra at the Classic Open Air 2014 event on the Gendarmenmarkt in Berlin. The orchestra consisted of 60 musicians. On this album Schiller has collaborated with the singers Midge Ure, Jaël Malli, Eva Mali and Der Graf from Unheilig. It was released in different editions. The cover artwork shows a bursting soap bubble in front of a black background. The album reached in its first week number 4 of the German albums chart.

It features the premiere of the song ″Berlin, Berlin″, which was only played and recorded live. It was also the first time, the song Sonne was played live with the singer Der Graf from Unheilig.

== Track listing ==
No.	Title	Length
1.	"Tune in"
2.	"Ein schöner Tag (with Eva Mali)"
3.	"Hochland"
4.	"Lichtermeer"
5.	"Desert Empire"
6.	"Schiller"
7.	"Ruhe"
8.	"Sehnsucht (Instrumental)"
9.	"Sehnsucht Reprise"
10.	"Sommernacht"
11.	"Berlin Moskau"
12.	"Tired (with Jaël)"
13.	"Let it Rise (with Midge Ure)"
14.	"Leben... I Feel You (Instrumental)"
15.	"Das Glockenspiel"
16.	"Solveig's Song (with Eva Mali)"
17.	"Sonne (with Unheilig)"
18.	"Berlin, Berlin"

== Charts ==
Chart performance for Symphonia
Chart (2014)	Peak position
Austrian Albums (Ö3 Austria)	46
German Albums (Offizielle Top 100)	4
Swiss Albums (Schweizer Hitparade)	23
