= Tagtraum =

Live album by Schiller
- Released: 16 November 2006
- Recorded: 2006
- Genre: Synthpop
- Length: 78:33
- Label: Universal / Island / Sleepingroom
- Producer: Christopher von Deylen

Schiller chronology
Tag und Nacht (Day & Night) (2005)	Tagtraum (2006)	Sehnsucht (Desire) (2008)

Tagtraum (Daydream) is a Live CD + DVD release by German electronic musician, composer and producer Christopher von Deylen under his Schiller alias. The CD contains several live recordings of the tracks found on the 2005 Schiller album Tag und Nacht. Recorded during Schillers 2006 'Tag und Nacht' tour.
DVD 1 holds additional music videos for 5 tracks, a documentary about Schiller's gig in Athen (specially invited by Depeche Mode), official music videos for the singles released in connection with the 'Tag und Nacht' album, Making of's and a photo album. The second DVD features an entire live concert - 120 minutes Schiller live in Germany.

== Track listing ==
No.	Title	Writer(s)	Length
1.	"Willkommen (UK: Welcome)"	Von Deylen	1:03
2.	"Nachtflug (UK: Nightflight)"	Von Deylen	6:00
3.	"Drifting and Dreaming (with Jette von Roth)" (With Jette von Roth)	Von Roth, von Deylen	4:29
4.	"What's Coming" (With Jette von Roth)	Von Roth, von Deylen	4:34
5.	"Morgentau (UK: Morning Dew)"	Von Deylen	4:04
6.	"I Saved You" (with Kim Sanders)	Sanders, von Deylen	4:41
7.	"I Know" (With Kim Sanders)	Sanders, von Deylen	5:07
8.	"Feuerwerk (UK: Fireworks)"	Von Deylen	6:04
9.	"Irrlicht (UK: Misguiding Light)"	Von Deylen	5:40
10.	"Sleepy Storm" (With Jette von Roth)	Von Roth, von Deylen	5:37
11.	"Der Tag...Du Bist Erwacht (UK: The Day...You are Awoken)" (With Jette von Roth)	Von Roth, von Deylen	4:20
12.	"Falling" (With Moya Brennan)	Brennan, von Deylen	5:32
13.	"Miles and Miles" (With Moya Brennan)	Brennan, von Deylen	5:34
14.	"Berlin Bombay"	Von Deylen	4:43
15.	"Leben...I Feel You (UK: Life...I Feel You)" (With Heppner)	Heppner, von Deylen	5:35
16.	"Die Nacht...Du Bist Nicht Allein (UK: The Night...You are Not Alone)" (With Thomas D.)	Thomas D., von Deylen	5:19
