= Sehnsucht Live =

Live album by Schiller
- Released: 14 November 2008
- Recorded: 2008
- Genre: Synthpop
- Length: 153:15
- Label: Universal / Island / Sleepingroom
- Producer: Christopher von Deylen

Schiller chronology
Sehnsucht (2008)	Sehnsucht Live (2008)	Atemlos (2010)

Sehnsucht Live is the third live album by German electronical musician, composer and producer Christopher von Deylen under his Schiller alias. The double album features several live versions of the tracks found on the 2008 album Sehnsucht. It was recorded at Palladium in Cologne, during Schiller's 2008 'Sehnsucht Live' tour. Furthermore, CD II holds brand new productions with internationally renowned artists Colbie Caillat and Lang Lang.

== Track listing ==
CD 01:

No.	Title	Writer(s)	Length
1.	"Sehnsucht (UK: Desire) (Instrumental) (Live in Stuttgart)"	Von Deylen	4:20
2.	"Wunschtraum (UK: Pipedream / Wishful Dream) (Live in Mainz)"	Von Deylen	4:48
3.	"Black (Live in Leipzig)" (Wit Jette von Roth)	Von Roth, von Deylen	5:14
4.	"Olsberg Eins (UK: Olsberg One)"	Von Deylen	3:53
5.	"Forever (Live in Stuttgart)" (with Kim Sanders)	Sanders, von Deylen	5:21
6.	"Denn Wer Liebt (UK: The One That Loves)(Live in Münster)" (With Anna Maria Mühe)	Von Deylen	4:31
7.	"Vor Der Zeit (UK: Prematurely) (Live in Köln)" (With Ben Becker)	Von Deylen	3:38
8.	"Herzschlag (UK: Heartbeat) (Live in Berlin)"	Von Deylen	4:36
9.	"Tired (Live in Hamburg)" (With Jaël)	Rahel Krebs, von Deylen	4:34
10.	"Rostock Eins (UK: Rostock One)"	Von Deylen	7:03
11.	"Breathe (Live in Berlin)" (With September)	J. von Der Burg, N. von Der Burg, A. Bhagavan, von Deylen	4:42
12.	"In The Dark (Live in Chemnitz)" (With Jette von Roth)	Von Roth, von Deylen	4:58
13.	"Sommernacht (UK: Summernight) (Live in Hamburg)"	Von Deylen	4:59
14.	"Rostock Zwei (UK: Rostock Two)"	Von Deylen	4:22
15.	"Nacht (UK: Night) (Live in Köln)" (With Ben Becker)	Von Deylen	4:04
16.	"Let Me Love You (Live in Chemnitz)" (With Kim Sanders)	Sanders, von Deylen	7:26

CD 02:

No.	Title	Writer(s)	Length
1.	"You (Video Version)" (With Colbie Caillat)	Caillat, von Deylen	4:11
2.	"Time For Dreams" (With Lang Lang)	Lang, von Deylen	3:15
3.	"Heaven" (With Bernstein)	Bernstein, von Deylen	3:54
4.	"Moonflower"	Von Deylen	5:13
5.	"Ile Aye (UK: Our World) (Instrumental Version)"	Von Deylen	4:10
6.	"Everything (instrumental version)"	Von Deylen	4:01
7.	"Klaus Schulze & Lisa Gerrard: Liquid Coincidence Part 2 (Schiller Remix)"	Schulze, Gerrard, von Deylen	9:44
8.	"Bernstein: Paradies (Schiller Remix)"	Bernstein, von Deylen	7:34
9.	"Zenit (Uncut Original Version)"	Schulze, von Deylen	32:38
