= Try (Schiller song) =

Schiller song

Single by Schiller with Nadia Ali

from the album Atemlos
- Released: 9 March 2010
- Genre: Electronica
- Label: Island Records (Universal Music)
- Songwriter(s): Christopher von Deylen
- Producer(s): Christopher von Deylen

Schiller singles chronology
"You" (2008)	"Try" (2010)	"I Will Follow You" (2010)

"Try" is the first single from the 2010 Schiller gold album Atemlos with vocals by singer Nadia Ali from New York City. The single was officially released on 9 March 2010 and peaked at number 58 on German Singles Chart in 2010. The single includes the song ″Salton Sea″. The cover art work shows a photograph of a scene from the music video with Nadia Ali and Christopher von Deylen. The music video was shot in Berlin, Germany.

== Track listing ==
=== Maxi single ===
No.	Title	Length
1.	"Try"	3:21
2.	"Salton Sea"	4:53

=== Remixes (Download single) ===
No.	Title	Length
1.	"Try (Thomas Gold Radio Edit)"	3:38
2.	"Try (Thomas Gold Remix)"	7:35
3.	"Try (Frank Lamboy Radio Edit)"	3:33
4.	"Try (Frank Lamboy Club Mix)"	6:35
5.	"Try (Jerry Ropero & Stefan Gruenwald In Motion Radio Edit"	3:47
6.	"Try (Jerry Ropero & Stefan Gruenwald In Motion Remix)"	7:56

== Credits ==
- Producer: Christopher von Deylen
- Vocals by Nadia Ali
- Photography by Philip Glaser

== Music video ==
The official music video for "Try" was produced by Free The Dragon Filmproduktion GmbH and was shot in late January 2010 in Germany by German director Marcus Sternberg. It has a length of 3:24 minutes. The video features Nadia Ali, Christopher von Deylen, drummer Cliff Hewitt and a male and a female dancer. The music video was shot in the former studios of the CCC Filmkunst in Berlin. It had its world premiere on 19 February 2010 on myvideo.de.

Other crew members:

- Editor: Sebastian Stoffels
- Gaffer: Christian Didi Hupfer
- Assistant production manager: Christoph Sommer

== Charts ==
Chart (2010)	Peak position
Germany (Media Control AG)	58
