= Summer in Berlin =

Summer in Berlin may refer to:

- Summer in Berlin (film), a 2005 German tragicomic film
- Summer in Berlin (album), a 2021 album by Schiller
