= Atemlos Live =

Live album by Schiller
- Released: 26 November 2010
- Recorded: 2010
- Genre: Synthpop
- Label: Universal / Island / Sleepingroom
- Producer: Christopher von Deylen

Schiller chronology
Atemlos (2010)	Atemlos Live (2010)	Lichtblick (2010)

Atemlos Live (Breathless - Live) is the fourth live album by German electronic musician, composer and producer Christopher von Deylen under his Schiller alias. It was released in 2010. The double album features several live recordings of the Atemlos (Breathless) album tracks. Recorded during Schiller's 'Atemlos Live' tour, spring 2010.

== Track listing ==
CD I
No.	Title	Length
1.	"Playing with Madness (Instrumental) (with Mia Bergström)"	5:25
2.	"Soho"	5:38
3.	"Tiefblau (UK: Deep Blue)"	5:48
4.	"Blind (with Anggun)"	4:30
5.	"Innocent Lies (with Anggun)"	4:00
6.	"Ruhe (Uk: Peace)"	4:14
7.	"La Mer"	4:19
8.	"Under My Skin (with Kim Sanders)"	5:07
9.	"Let Me Love You (with Kim Sanders)"	8:05
10.	"Polarstern"	4:41
11.	"Schiller"	7:20
12.	"Don't Go (with Kate Havnevik)"	5:43
13.	"The Fire (with Kate Havnevik)"
14.	"Let It Rise (with Midge Ure)"	6:04

CD II
No.	Title	Length
1.	"Salton Sea"	5:16
2.	"Delicately Yours (with Kim Sanders)"	5:11
3.	"Irrlicht (UK: Misguiding Light)"	5:38
4.	"Himmelblau (UK: Sky Blue)"	5:41
5.	"Das Glockenspiel (UK: The Bell)"	6:02
6.	"Always You (with Anggun)"	4:38
7.	"Reprise Teil 1 (UK: Reprise part I)"	3:18
8.	"Reprise Teil 2"	2:17
9.	"Ein Schöner Tag (UK: A Beautiful Day)"	5:45
10.	"Sehnsucht (UK: Desire)"	5:02
11.	"Let It Rise (with Midge Ure)"	4:31
12.	"Playing with Madness (with Mia Bergström)"	4:33
13.	"Sommernacht (UK: Summer Night)"	5:29
