= Leben (Schiller album) =

Studio album by Schiller
- Released: 13 October 2003
- Recorded: 2002–2003
- Genre: Synthpop, trance
- Label: Universal / Polydor Island
- Producer: Christopher von Deylen

Schiller chronology
Weltreise (2001)	Leben (2003)	Live Erleben (2004)

Singles from Leben
- 1. "Liebe (with Milü) (UK: Love)" Released: 22 September 2003; 2. "Leben...I Feel You (with Heppner) (UK: Life...I Feel You)" Released: 1 October 2003; 3. "The Smile (with Sarah Brightman) (Promo CD Only!)" Released: 2004

Leben is the third studio album by German electronic musician, composer and producer Christopher von Deylen under his Schiller alias. It features collaborations with renowned vocalists such as Sarah Brightman, Maya Saban, Peter Heppner and Kim Sanders. Schiller used Daf and Tombak which are the two most Powerful Persian percussive instruments on the 10th track of this album (The Smile ft Sarah Brightman)

The album achieved platinum status in Germany in 2016.

== Track listing ==
No.	Title	Writer(s)	Length
1.	"Willkommen (UK: Welcome)" (Spoken words: Franziska Pigulla)	Von Deylen	1:11
2.	"Sommerregen (UK: Summer Rain)"	Von Deylen	3:54
3.	"I've Seen It All" (With Maya Saban)	Von Deylen	4:51
4.	"Zukunft (UK: Future)"	Von Deylen	4:34
5.	"Liebe (UK: Love)" (With Mila Mar), Spoken Words: Jürgen Thorman)	Hachfeld, von Deylen	4:06
6.	"Einklang (UK: Accord / Harmony)"	Von Deylen	4:42
7.	"I Miss You" (With Maya Saban), Acoustic & Electric Guitar: Mickey Meinert)	Von Deylen	6:03
8.	"Leben... I Feel You" (With Heppner)	Heppner, von Deylen	5:35
9.	"Mittelerde (UK: Middle Earth)"	Von Deylen	4:54
10.	"The Smile" (With Sarah Brightman), Acoustic & Electric Guitar: Mickey Meinert, Spoken Words: Jürgen Thorman)	Von Deylen	5:34
11.	"Dreiklang (UK: Triad)"	Schnakenberg, von Deylen	4:30
12.	"Babel" (With Mila Mar)	Hachfeld, von Deylen	4:22
13.	"Desire" (With Veljanov)	Veljanov	4:02
14.	"Stille (UK: Quiet)" (Spoken Words: Jürgen Thorman)	Von Deylen	4:15
15.	"Vergangenheit (UK: Past)"	Von Deylen	4:29
16.	"Delicately Yours" (With Kim Sanders), Acoustic & Electric Guitar: Mickey Meinert)	Sanders	4:58
17.	"Ausklang (UK: Finale / Conclusion)" (Acoustic & Electric Guitar: Mickey Meinert)	Von Deylen	3:45
