= Lichtblick =

2010 compilation album by Schiller

Box set by Schiller
- Released: 26 November 2010
- Recorded: 2010
- Genre: Pop, electronic
- Label: Island
- Producer: Christopher Von Deylen

Schiller chronology
Atemlos Live (2010)	Lichtblick (2010)	Sonne (2012)

Lichtblick EP

EP by Schiller
- Released: 26 November 2010
- Recorded: 2010
- Genre: Electronica, synthpop
- Length: 44:11
- Label: Universal / Island / Sleepingroom
- Producer: Christopher von Deylen

Lichtblick ("Ray of Hope") is a CD + DVD release by German electronic artist Christopher Von Deylen under his principal project Schiller. The album was released on 26 November 2010, and contains 9 compositions from Schiller.

Lichtblick features collaborations with other international artists such as Kate Havnevik, Mia Bergström, Anggun and Despina Vandi.

== Tracking listing ==
=== Super Deluxe Edition ===
The super deluxe edition of the album will be offered as a box set containing three discs (2 DVD + 1 CD).

Lichtblick EP - CD

1. Lichtblick (UK: Ray of Hope)
2. Ghost (with Kate Havnevik)
3. Zeitschleife (UK: Time Warp)
4. Daylight (with Mia Bergström)
5. Heimathafen (UK: Home Port)
6. Innocent Lies (with Anggun)
7. Le Vide
8. Sunday (with Despina Vandi)
9. Lichtblick Reprise

DVD 01 - Atemlos Live

Atemlos Live

1. Playing With Madness (Instrumental)
2. Soho
3. Tiefblau (UK: Deep Blue)
4. Blind (with Anggun)
5. Innocent Lies (with Anggun)
6. Ruhe (UK: Peace)
7. La Mer
8. Under My Skin (with Kim Sanders)
9. Let Me Love You (with Kim Sanders)
10. Polarstern
11. Schiller
12. Don't Go (with Kate Havnevik)
13. The Fire (with Kate Havnevik)
14. Salton Sea
15. Delicately Yours (with Kim Sanders)
16. Irrlicht (UK: Misguiding Light)
17. Himmelblau (UK: Blue Sky)
18. Das Glockenspiel (UK: The Bell)
19. Always You (with Anggun)
20. Reprise Part 1
21. Reprise Part 2
22. Ein Schoener Tag (UK: A Beautiful Day)
23. Sehnsucht (UK: Desire)
24. Let It Rise (with Midge Ure)
25. Playing With Madness (with Mia Bergström)
26. Sommernacht (UK: Summer Night)

Audiokommentar

- Christopher von Deylen ueber die entstehung von atemlos live

Surround test

- Audio-referenz zum einpegeln des surround-sounds

DVD 02 - Heimathafen

Heimathafen

1. Schiller
2. Soho
3. Polarstern
4. Atemlos
5. Leidenschaft (UK: Passion)
6. Heimathafen
7. Tiefblau
8. Irrlicht
9. La Mer
10. Himmelblau

Ten more

- kurzfilm von philip glaser

Zeitschleife

- Bilderreise durch schiller's lichterwelt

Wall of friends

- Become a part of lichtblick

=== Ultra Deluxe Edition ===
CD

1. Lichtblick
2. Ghost (with Kate Havnevik)
3. Zeitschleife
4. Daylight (with Mia Bergström)
5. Heimathafen
6. Innocent Lies (with Anggun)
7. Le Vide
8. Sunday (with Despina Vandi)
9. Lichtblick Reprise

DVD 01

Atemlos Live

1. Playing With Madness (Instrumental)
2. Soho
3. Tiefblau
4. Blind (with Anggun)
5. Innocent Lies (with Anggun)
6. Ruhe
7. La Mer
8. Under My Skin (with Kim Sanders)
9. Let Me Love You (with Kim Sanders)
10. Polarstern
11. Schiller
12. Don't Go (with Kate Havnevik)
13. The Fire (with Kate Havnevik)
14. Salton Sea
15. Delicately Yours (with Kim Sanders)
16. Irrlicht
17. Himmelblau
18. Das Glockenspiel
19. Always You (with Anggun)
20. Reprise Part 1
21. Reprise Part 2
22. Ein Schoener Tag
23. Sehnsucht
24. Let It Rise (with Midge Ure)
25. Playing With Madness (with Mia Bergström)
26. Sommernacht

Audiokommentar

- Christopher von Deylen ueber die entstehung von atemlos live

Surround test

- Audio-referenz zum einpegeln des surround-sounds

DVD 02

Heimathafen

1. Schiller
2. Soho
3. Polarstern
4. Atemlos
5. Leidenschaft
6. Heimathafen
7. Tiefblau
8. Irrlicht
9. La Mer
10. Himmelblau

Ten more

- kurzfilm von philip glaser

Zeitschleife

- Bilderreise durch schiller's lichterwelt

Wall of friends

- Become a part of lichtblick

EXTRA 2CD: ATEMLOS LIVE

CD 01

1. Laying With Madness (Instrumental)
2. Soho
3. Tiefblau
4. Blind (with Anggun)
5. Innocent Lies (with Anggun)
6. Ruhe
7. La Mer
8. Under My Skin (with Kim Sanders)
9. Let Me Love You (with Kim Sanders)
10. Polarstern
11. Schiller
12. Don't Go (with Kate Havnevik)
13. The Fire (with Kate Havnevik)

CD 02

1. Salton Sea
2. Delicately Yours (with Kim Sanders)
3. Irrlicht
4. Himmelblau
5. Das Glockenspiel
6. Always You (with Anggun)
7. Reprise Part 1
8. Reprise Part 2
9. Ein Schoener Tag
10. Sehnsucht
11. Let It Rise (with Midge Ure)
12. Playing With Madness (with Mia Bergström)
13. Sommernacht
