= Opus (Schiller album) =

Studio album by Schiller
- Released: August 30, 2013
- Recorded: 2013
- Genre: Electronica, ambient, synthpop
- Label: Panorama (Deutsche Grammophon), We Love Music (Starwatch Entertainment, Universal Music Germany)
- Producer: Christopher von Deylen

Schiller chronology
Sonne (2012)	Opus (2013)	Future (2016)

Opus is the eighth studio album of the music project Schiller created by the German electronic musician Christopher Von Deylen. The album was announced on July 1, 2013 and was released on August 30, 2013. On this album Schiller has collaborated with Russian operatic soprano Anna Netrebko, French pianist Hélène Grimaud and German classical oboist Albrecht Mayer. Opus is the first release of the new label "Panorama" by Deutsche Grammophon. The album reached in its first week number 1 of the German albums chart and number 6 in Switzerland and number 10 in Austria. These are the highest entries of Schiller in Austria and Switzerland and the fourth number-1-album of Schiller in Germany. Schiller has received a Gold award in Germany in December 2013 for 100.000 sold albums of Opus. In 2014 a reedition of the album was released: Opus - White Album.

== Album ==
The album Opus combines electronic music with classical music such as Swan Lake. It's also inspired by and based on songs such as Gymnopédie no. 1 by Erik Satie, Edvard Grieg's "Solveig's Song" from Peer Gynt, Sergei Rachmaninoff's Rhapsody on a Theme of Paganini op. 43 and Claude Debussy's Rêverie. After Schiller already released some singles with classical influences such as "Ein schöner Tag" (2000) with German singer Isgaard and "Time for Dreams" (2008) with Chinese pianist Lang Lang, it's the first completely classical inspired album of Schiller. Originally it was planned as a purely instrumental album, but then it was supplemented with vocals during the developing process. For the creation of the album Christopher von Deylen travelled to the Coachella Valley in California, USA. The performances of Anna Netrebko were recorded in the Dvorák Hall of the Rudolfinum in Prague, Hélène Grimaud's performances were recorded at the Kaufman Astoria Studios in New York City, Diana Tishchenko's and Albrecht Mayer's performances were recorded at the b-sharp Studios in Berlin.

It was released in different editions, including the limited "Ultra Deluxe Edition" of 2.500 exemplares handsigned by Christopher von Deylen. Schiller presented this album for the first time to journalists and traders at four exclusive listening sessions in Berlin, Hamburg, Munich and Cologne. On August 29, 2013 and August 30, 2013 the album Opus was presented to the Schiller fans at two album release events in Berlin.

With the album Opus, Schiller introduced, for the first time since the debut album Zeitgeist, a new logotype and a completely new corporate identity. It's also the first album without a name in German language. And it's the first Schiller album without the standard "Willkommen" (welcome) introduction and the first with a photography instead of a graphic on its cover. The art work includes pictures by photographer Philip Glaser. The cover landscape photo was shot by Toby Harriman.

The music video of Swan Lake had its world premiere on August 30, 2013 on the websites mtv.de and viva.tv. Even though Swan Lake wasn't officially released as a single, the song charted at position 57 on the German singles chart. The music video was produced by Peacock Productions London and was shot in Coachella Valley in the United States. The video was produced and directed by Tara Clark and Caroline Jones.

== Track listings ==
=== Standard edition ===
1. Opus: Exposition
2. Desert empire
3. Gymnopédie no. 1 (with Hélène Grimaud)
4. Swan lake (with Albrecht Mayer)
5. Solveig's song (with Anna Netrebko)
6. Twentynine palms
7. Promenade
8. El cielo
9. Rêverie
10. Imperial valley
11. Sunrise way
12. In paradisum
13. Rhapsody on a theme of paganini (with Hélène Grimaud)
14. Opus: Reprise

=== Deluxe edition ===
CD 1

1. Opus: Exposition
2. Desert empire
3. Gymnopédie no. 1 (with Hélène Grimaud)
4. Swan lake (with Albrecht Mayer)
5. Solveig's song (with Anna Netrebko)
6. Twentynine palms
7. Promenade
8. El cielo
9. Rêverie
10. Imperial valley
11. Sunrise way
12. In paradisum
13. Rhapsody on a theme of paganini (with Hélène Grimaud)
14. Opus: Reprise

Exclusive bonus tracks on special editions:

- The Planets: Jupiter
- The Four Seasons: Spring

CD 2

1. Desert empire: Variation
2. L'horizon
3. Gymnopédie no. 1: variation (with Diana Tishchenko)
4. Bermuda dunes
5. Indian canyons
6. Swan lake: variation (with Albrecht Mayer)
7. Imperial valley: variation
8. L'horizon empire

=== Limited Ultra Deluxe edition ===
CD 1

1. Opus: Exposition
2. Desert empire
3. Gymnopédie no. 1 (with Hélène Grimaud)
4. Swan lake (with Albrecht Mayer)
5. Solveig's song (with Anna Netrebko)
6. Twentynine palms
7. Promenade
8. El cielo
9. Rêverie
10. Imperial valley
11. Sunrise way
12. In paradisum
13. Rhapsody on a theme of paganini (with Hélène Grimaud)
14. Opus: Reprise

CD 2

1. Desert empire: Variation
2. L'horizon
3. Gymnopédie no. 1: variation (with Diana Tishchenko)
4. Bermuda dunes
5. Indian canyons
6. Swan lake: variation (with Albrecht Mayer)
7. Imperial valley: variation
8. L'horizon empire

CD 03 - Horizon

1. Horizon Part I 5:28
2. Horizon Part II 7:17
3. Horizon Part III 6:43
4. Horizon Part IV 6:21
5. Horizon Part V 8:32
6. Horizon Part VI 8:25
7. Horizon Part VII 8:37

CD 04 - Originals

1. Pictures At An Exhibition: Promenade (Modest Mussorgsky) - New York Philharmonic (Orchestra) & Giuseppe Sinopoli (Conductor) 1:08
2. Solveig's Song (Edvard Grieg) - Anna Netrebko (Voice), Prague Philharmonia (Orchestra) & Emmanuel Villaume (Conductor) 5:00
3. In Paradisum (from 'Requiem op. 48) (Gabriel Fauré) - Philharmonia Chorus & Orchestra (Orchestra) & Carlo Maria Giulini (Conductor) 3:50
4. Swan Lake: Scene (Piotr Illitch Tchaïkovsky) - Boston Symphony Orchestra (Orchestra) & Seiji Ozawa (Conductor) 2:38
5. Rêverie (Claude Debussy) - Pascal Rogé (Piano) 4:55
6. Gymnopédie No. 1 (Erik Satie) - Hélène Grimaud (Piano) 3:37

=== Limited White edition ===
1. Opus: Exposition
2. Desert Empire
3. Gymnopédie No. 1 (with Hélène Grimaud)
4. Swan Lake (with Albrecht Mayer)
5. Solveig's Song (with Anna Netrebko)
6. Twentynine Palms
7. Promenade
8. El Cielo
9. Rêverie
10. Imperial Valley
11. Sunrise Way
12. In Paradisum
13. Rhapsody On A Theme Of Pagani (with Hélène Grimaud)
14. Opus: Reprise
15. Apollo Peak
16. Time For Dreams (Variation) (with Lang Lang)
17. Un Bel Di | Ein Schöner Tag (with Eva Mali)

== Charts ==
Chart (2013–14)	Peak position
Austrian Albums (Ö3 Austria)	10
German Albums (Offizielle Top 100)	1
Polish Albums (ZPAV)	27
Swiss Albums (Schweizer Hitparade)	6

== Credits and personnel ==
- Christopher von Deylen – music and production of all tracks
- Anna Netrebko – vocals on "Solveig's Song"
- Eva Mali – vocals on "Un Bel Di | Ein Schöner Tag"
- Hélène Grimaud – piano on "Gymnopédie No. 1"; "Rhapsody On A Theme Of Pagani"
- Albrecht Mayer – oboe on "Swan Lake"
- Diana Tishchenko – violin on "Solveig's Song"
- Lang Lang – music on "Time for Dreams (Variation)"
- The London Symphony Orchestra – orchestra on "Un Bel Di | Ein Schöner Tag"

=== Cover art ===
- Philip Glaser – photography
- Toby Harriman – photography
- Katja Stier – artwork
- Sandra Morath – artwork
