= Trance Allstars =

German trance music project

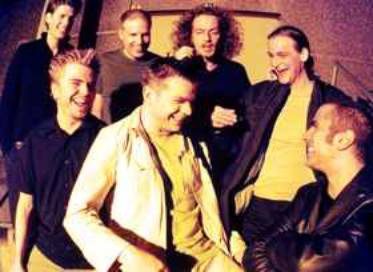
Trance Allstars

Trance Allstars is a trance music project created in 1999 as a collaboration between two German record companies that specialized in dance music, Kontor Records and Polydor Zeitgeist (UMG).

== Background ==
The Trance Allstars project was active from 1999 through 2002, in which the group released two CD compilation albums, 'Worldwide' and 'Synergy II - The Story Continues', as well as a number of successful cover version singles : 'The First Rebirth', 'Lost In Love' and 'Ready To Flow'.

March 2025, after more than two decades, Trance Allstars released their first original single in 23 years 'Let's All Be Stars'. Written and produced by members, Torsten Stenzel, Christopher von Deylen and Andreas Tomalla. Spoken words by Torsten's youngest daughter, Leila Stenzel (aka. Mahe').

The project initially consisted of the following renowned German electronic music artists

- Taucher (Ralph-Armand Beck)
- Talla 2XLC (Andreas Tomalla)
- Schiller (Christopher von Deylen & Mirko von Schlieffen)
- ATB (André Tanneberger)
- Sunbeam (Florian Preis & Michael Gerlach)
- DJ Mellow-D (Christian Scharnweber)

== Return of Trance Allstars 2024 ==
January 2024 Talla 2XLC announced the return of Trance Allstars via his official Instagram artist page. This, however, with a minor change to the artist lineup, as ATB is replaced by beloved electronic music project YORK (Torsten Stenzel). Stenzel has previously, albeit not officially, been associated with the project in the form of his productions for Taucher. Torsten was Taucher's co-songwriter/producer in the years 1993-2003

As of 2024 Trance Allstars consist of following artists:

- Schiller
- Talla 2XLC
- YORK
- Taucher
- Sunbeam
- DJ Mellow-D (aka. Mellow Trax)

== Discography ==
=== Studio albums ===
Title	Chart positions		Year
Title	CH	DE	Year
Worldwide	37	15	2000
Synergy II – The Story Continues		19	2002

=== Singles ===
Title	Chart positions			Year
Title	AT	CH	DE	Year
The First Rebirth		45	18	1999
Ready to Flow		83	35	2000
Lost in Love	39	62	21	2002
Go	52		38	2002
Let's All Be Stars				2025
