= Tag und Nacht (album) =

Studio album by Schiller
- Released: 28 October 2005
- Recorded: 2004–2005
- Genre: Synthpop, trance
- Length: 117:27
- Label: Universal / Island / Sleepingroom
- Producer: Christopher von Deylen

Schiller chronology
| Live Erleben (2004) | Tag und Nacht (2005) | Tagtraum (2006) |

Singles from Tag und Nacht
- 1. "Die Nacht... Du bist nicht allein" (with Thomas D.) – UK: "The Night... You Are Not Alone" Released: 14 October 2005; 2. "Der Tag... Du bist erwacht" (with Jette von Roth) – UK: "The Day... You Are Awoken" Released: 24 March 2006

Tag und Nacht (Day and Night) is the fourth studio album by the German electronic musician, composer, and producer Christopher von Deylen under his Schiller alias. It includes collaborations with international artists Moya Brennan, Mike Oldfield, and Kim Sanders, among others.

== Release ==
"Die Nacht... Du bist nicht allein" with vocals by German singer Thomas D and his wife Tina Dürr. The single includes the song "Sonnenaufgang". The cover art work shows a graphic of the moon. The music video for "Die Nacht... Du bist nicht allein" was produced by Free the Dragon Filmproduktion GmbH and was shot in one day in 2005 in Berlin by Marcus Sternberg. It has a length of 4:26 minutes. The video features Thomas D. and Christopher von Deylen. It's the first appearance of Christopher von Deylen in a music video of Schiller. The music video was shot on different locations in Berlin such as the city highway (Bundesautobahn 100) and a forest in Zehlendorf.

== Commercial performance ==
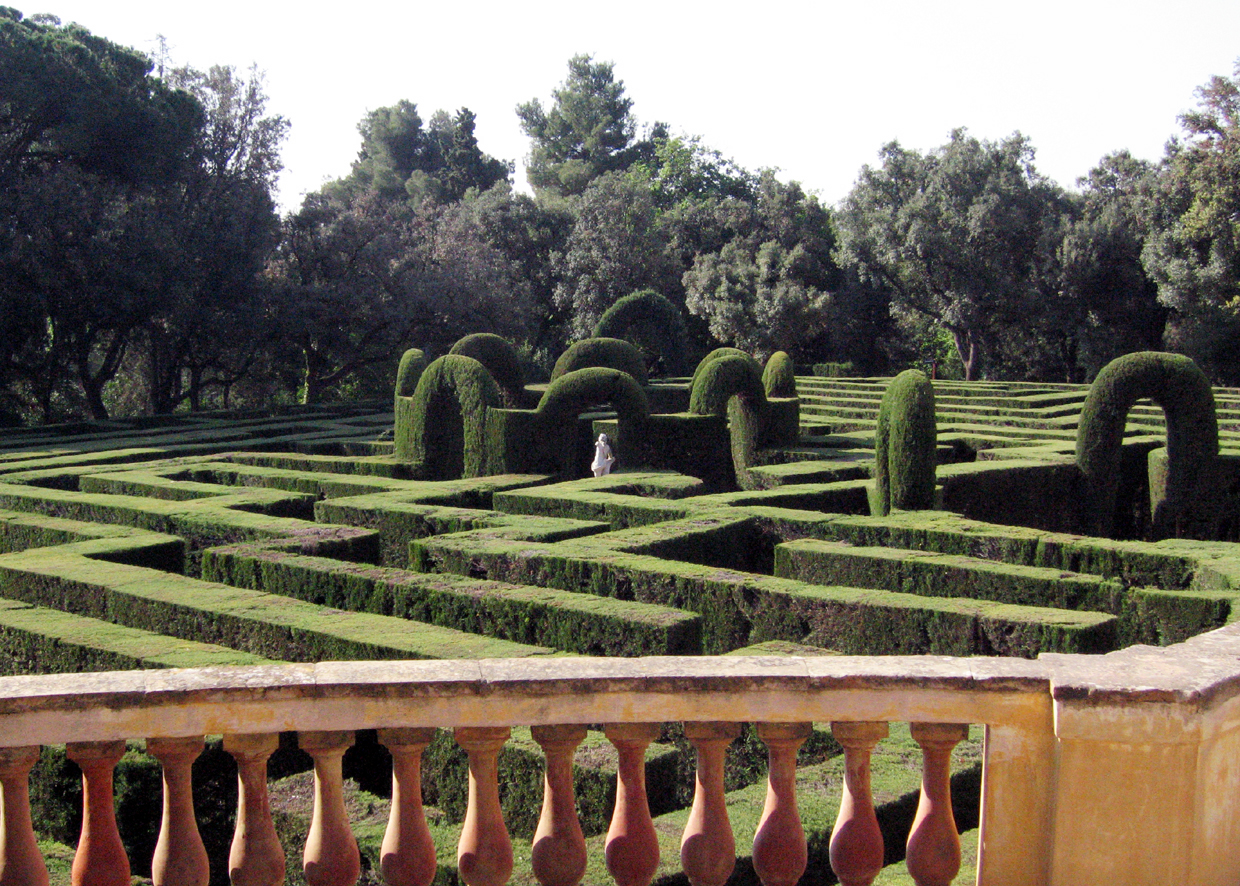
The location of the video shot: Parc del Laberint d'Horta

In 2005, "Die Nacht... Du bist nicht allein" peaked at number 24 on Media Control Charts in Germany, and peaking in Swiss Charts at number 80.

"Der Tag... Du bist erwacht" peaked at number 43 on Media Control Charts) in German in 2006. The single includes the song "Wolkentraum". The cover art work shows a graphic of the sun. The music video for "Der Tag... Du bist erwacht" was produced by Free The Dragon Filmproduktion GmbH and was shot in 2006 in the Spanish city Barcelona by German director Marcus Sternberg. It has a length of 4:14 minutes. It's the 10th music video of Schiller. The video features Jette von Roth, Christopher von Deylen, a Spanish girl and a Spanish boy. The music video was shot in the Parc del Laberint d'Horta in Barcelona, Spain.

== Track listing ==
| No. | Title | Length |
|---|---|---|
| 1. | "Willkommen" – UK: "Welcome" | 1:09 |
| 2. | "Nachtflug" – UK: "Nightflight" | 5:54 |
| 3. | "Die Nacht... Du bist nicht allein" – UK: "The Night... You Are Not Alone" (with Thomas D.) | 4:26 |
| 4. | "What's Coming" (with Jette von Roth) | 4:26 |
| 5. | "Sonnenaufgang" – UK: "Sunrise" | 3:14 |
| 6. | "Miles and Miles" (with Moya Brennan) | 4:41 |
| 7. | "Schritt der Zeit" – UK: "Pace of Time" | 2:56 |
| 8. | "I Know" (with Kim Sanders) | 5:01 |
| 9. | "Morgentau" – UK: "Morning Dew" (with Mike Oldfield) | 4:09 |
| 10. | "Berlin Bombay" | 5:19 |
| 11. | "Der Tag... Du bist erwacht" – UK: "The Day... You Are Awoken" (with Jette von Roth) | 4:00 |
| 12. | "Lichtwerk" – UK: "Lightwork" | 3:30 |
| 13. | "Falling" (with Moya Brennan) | 5:13 |
| 14. | "Jahresringe" – UK: "Annual Rings" | 3:41 |
| 15. | "I Saved You" (with Kim Sanders) | 4:39 |
| 16. | "Irrlicht" – UK: "Misguiding Light" | 3:18 |
| 17. | "Feuerwerk" – UK: "Firework" | 5:03 |
| 18. | "Sleepy Storm" (with Jette von Roth) | 5:09 |
| 19. | "Eine Stunde" – UK: "One Hour" (from the film Yamamoto's Labyrinth) | 1:37 |
