= Summer in Berlin (album) =

Studio album by Schiller
- Released: 12 February 2021
- Recorded: 2020
- Genre: Electronic; ambient; synth-pop
- Label: Sony Music Artist Concepts
- Producer: Christopher von Deylen

Schiller chronology
Morgenstund (2019)	Summer in Berlin (2021)

Christopher von Deylen chronology
Colors (2020)	Summer in Berlin (2021)

Summer in Berlin is the eleventh studio album of the music project Schiller, created by the German electronic musician Christopher von Deylen. The album was released on 12 February 2021. On this album Schiller has collaborated with the singers Tricia McTeague and Janet Devlin, the musician Quaeschning from Tangerine Dream and the music group Alphaville. It will be released in different editions, including the limited "Super Deluxe Edition".

On 8 November 2020, Schiller officially announced on Facebook the release of a new album with the name "Summer in Berlin" and its cover artwork were revealed.

The Super Deluxe Edition will include two BlueRays with the concerts: "Live in Berlin", "Berlin Moskau: The Ultimate Experience", "Schiller x Quaesching: Behind Closed Doors Part II" and "Lichtsommer Live". And the extras: "Summer in Germany: Die Dokumentation", "Exklusives Behind the Scenes Material", "Videoclips", "Wall of Friends" and "Live in Berlin: Das Live Album".

The cover artwork shows the Victoria statue of the Berlin Victory Column in gold in front of a violet background. The same cover art is also used for the songs of the album, but in different colors.

== Track listings ==
The album includes following songs:

- Der goldene Engel
- Miracle (with Tricia McTeague)
- Metropolis
- Summer in Berlin (remix of the Alphaville song from 1984)
- Der Klang der Stadt I
- Der Klang der Stadt II
- Liebe aus Beton
- Better Now (with Janet Devlin)
- Dem Himmel so nah (with Quaeschning)

== Music videos ==
- Der goldene Engel
- Miracle
- Metropolis
- Summer in Berlin

== Credits and personnel ==
- Christopher von Deylen – music and production of all tracks
- Tricia McTeague – lyrics and vocals on "Miracle"
- Marian Gold – vocals for the original recording of Alphaville's "Summer in Berlin"
- Janet Devlin – vocals on "Better Now"
- Thorsten Quaeschning – music on "Dem Himmel so nah"

== Charts ==
Chart performance for Summer in Berlin
Chart (2021)	Peak position
Austrian Albums (Ö3 Austria)	11
German Albums (Offizielle Top 100)	1
Swiss Albums (Schweizer Hitparade)	11
