= Sonne (album) =

Studio album by Schiller
- Released: 5 October 2012
- Recorded: Summer 2012
- Genre: Electronica, ambient, synth-pop
- Label: Universal / Island
- Producer: Christopher von Deylen

Schiller chronology
Lichtblick (2010)	Sonne (2012)	Opus (2013)

Singles from Sonne
- 1. "Sonne (mit Unheilig)" Released: 21 September 2012; 2. "Lichtermeer / Sleepless" Released: 8 March 2013

Sonne (English: Sun) is the seventh studio album under the project Schiller created by the German electronic musician Christopher Von Deylen. The album was announced on the project's official website and Facebook page on 28 July 2012 and was released on 5 October 2012. It is internationally marketed as Sun. On this album Schiller has collaborated with among others American multi-instrumentalist and vocalist Adam Young of Owl City and Andrea Corr of Irish band The Corrs. Furthermore, Norwegian singer and songwriter Kate Havnevik and Welsh alternative pop band Paper Aeroplanes. The album includes the two music videos Solaris and Sahara Avenue.

The Super Deluxe Edition of the new album will contain 2 CDs and 2 DVDs featuring 29 new studio productions from Christopher Von Deylen. The DVDs will include material from the Klangwelten tour, as well as an exclusive limited audience club concert in Cologne.

The album achieved gold status in Germany in 2016.

In 2013 there was a release of a Chill Out Edition of Sonne.

== Track listings ==
=== Deluxe Edition ===
CD I

No.	Title	Writer(s)	Length
1.	"Willkommen"	Von Deylen	1:14
2.	"Solaris"	Von Deylen	3:55
3.	"Kon-Tiki"	Von Deylen	4:24
4.	"Revelation"	Von Deylen	5:25
5.	"Sonne (UK: Sun)" (with Unheilig)	Graf, von Deylen	4:28
6.	"Mitternacht (UK: Midnight)"	Von Deylen	4:38
7.	"Hallucinating Beauty" (with Kate Havnevik)	Havnevik, von Deylen	6:36
8.	"Morgenrot (UK: Dawn)"	Von Deylen	4:49
9.	"Alive" (with Adam Young)	Young, von Deylen	4:46
10.	"Berlin - Moskau"	Von Deylen	5:03
11.	"Lichtermeer (UK: Sea of Lights)"	Von Deylen	4:23
12.	"Soleil De Nuit (UK: Sun of The Night)" (with Pierre Maubouché)	Von Deylen	4:16
13.	"Reach Out" (with Meredith Call)	Call, von Deylen	5:07
14.	"Das Dritte Auge (UK: The Third Eye)"	Von Deylen	5:04
15.	"Velvet Aeroplane" (with Kate Havnevik)	Havnevik, von Deylen	7:23

CD II

No.	Title	Writer(s)	Length
1.	"Sonnenuhr (UK: Sundial)"	Von Deylen	5:46
2.	"Oasis" (with Kate Havnevik)	Havnevik, Von Deylen	5:08
3.	"Sonnenwelten (UK: Sunworlds)"	Von Deylen	5:59
4.	"Epic Shores" (with Meredith Call)	Call, von Deylen	5:56
5.	"Energy" (with Tim Brownlow)	Kayvan, Brownlow, von Deylen	4:31
6.	"Pale Blue Eyes" (with Andrea Corr)	Reed	5:31
7.	"Ultramarin (UK: Ultramarine)"	Von Deylen	4:57
8.	"Dancing in The Dark" (with Ameerah)	Roelants, Geddis, von Deylen	5:27
9.	"Klangwelten (UK: Worlds of Sound)"	Von Deylen	4:19
10.	"Lay Down" (with Paper Aeroplanes)	Howells, Llewellyn, von Deylen	4:15
11.	"Geborgenheit (UK: Safety)"	Von Deylen	3:59
12.	"Sahara Avenue"	Von Deylen	5:16
13.	"The Silence" (with Meredith Call)	Call, von Deylen	4:55
14.	"Reprise"	Von Deylen	3:43
