= Henree =

Henree אלי מזרחי
- Born: Eli Mizrahi; November 20, 1978 (age 47)
- Occupation: DJ
- Years active: 2002–present
- Website: henreemusic.com

Henree (born Eli Mizrahi; Hebrew: אלי מזרחי on November 20, 1978) is an Israeli songwriter, producer and musician.

== Biography ==
Henree started his musical career in 2002 as an artist signed to Virgin Records after someone overheard a demo of his at a party. Henree has spent the majority of his time in Israel, despite an extended period of stay in Europe working mostly in Belgium. He has worked with top Israeli artists and written a string of number one hit songs in a few gold and multi platinum-selling albums in Israel, like Hagiga (Celebration), a song he wrote for Sarit Hadad.

== Henree feat. Nikka ==
In the summer of 2004, through a mutual friend, Henree met Nikka (Maayan Bukaee, transgender singer, born in 1982), recognized her talent and took her under his wing. At the age of 18, Nikka had changed her gender from male to female. The first two mega-hits "See Me Now (Finally)" and "Naked In The Wind" made the duo one of the hottest names in the club scene worldwide, plus the hit "B'gida" (Betrayal) in Hebrew. Their debut album "Revolution" was released at the end of 2006. Since then, the duo has recorded a series of singles: "Mashehu Acher", and "Discotec", a duet with the Israeli band Ethnix featuring Nikka.

== Discography ==
=== Studio albums ===
- 2003: Plastic Sound
- 2006: Revolution

=== EPs ===
- 2020: Off Grid
