= Time for Dreams =

Single by Schiller with Lang Lang

from the album Sehnsucht
- Released: 8 August 2008
- Genre: Electronica
- Label: Island Records (Universal Music)
- Songwriter: Christopher von Deylen
- Producer: Christopher von Deylen

Schiller singles chronology
"Der Tag… Du bist erwacht" (2006)	"Time for Dreams" (2008)	"You" (2008)

Time for Dreams is the second single from the 2008 Schiller platinum album Sehnsucht, featuring Chinese pianist Lang Lang.

== Production and description ==
The song "Time for Dreams" was composed by Christopher von Deylen and was recorded in the middle of May 2008 in the Teldex Studios in Berlin. On 15 June 2008 von Deylen and Lang Lang presented their new song to the press in Berlin.

== Release and reception ==
The single was officially released on 8 August 2008 and was peaking at number 19 on German Singles Chart in 2008. The single includes also the new song "Moonflower" and a live version of the song Wunschtraum. A limited edition of the single included an autograph of Christopher von Deylen. The cover art work shows a photo of both artists. The music video was shot in Berlin.

Time for Dreams was released on the re-release of the album Sehnsucht, and is also a track on the live album Sehnsucht Live. The song became also part of the Lang Lang album Dreams of China.

The song Wunschtraum Live was recorded during the Sehnsucht Live Tour 2008 at the concert in Mainz on 20 May 2008. The stereo-mixing was mixed by Bodo Schulte.

Time for Dreams became the official song of German broadcaster ZDF for the Olympic Games in 2008 in China and was played during the pictures of the day.

Schiller and Lang Lang presented the song live on 22 June 2008 at a ZDF broadcast from the lake stage in Bregenz, Austria, during the UEFA European Championship, with an audience of over ten million television viewers.

== Track listing ==
=== Maxi single ===
The single includes a teaser video of Sehnsucht Live.

No.	Title	Length
1.	"Time for Dreams"	3:12
2.	"Herzschlag"	4:10
3.	"Wunschtraum (Live)"	4:48
4.	"Moonflower"	5:13

== Credits ==
- Producer and composed by Christopher von Deylen
- Piano: Performed by Lang Lang, arranged by Matthias Suschke and recorded by Tobias Lehmann. Engineer of Piano-soundprocessing: Bodo Schulte. Piano recorded in Teldex-Studio, Berlin.
- Artwork by Katja Stier
- Photography by Philip Glaser

== Music video ==
The music video for "Times for Dreams" was recorded during the works on the song at the Teldex-Studio in Berlin. It shows scenes of the collaboration between Christopher von Deylen and Lang Lang and the recording of the song in the studio.

== Charts ==
Chart (2008)	Peak position
Germany (Media Control AG)	19
