= Pierre Maubouché =

French actor

Pierre Guy Maubouché is a French actor. As a visual actor, he has contributed to several movies, including The Last Horror Movie, but he is better known within the industry for his voiceover skills and contributions. Among the better-known projects to which he contributed are the worldwide Dolce & Gabbaba Light Blue Pour Homme television advertising campaign; the cult English TV commercial for Stella Artois, "The Hero's Return", in which all the male voices (besides the main characters') are his; the similarly cult Lynx (Axe) commercial for French television; and the character Raven in the French version of the game Metal Gear Solid. Many other projects are listed on his website, . Maubouché has also done voiceover work with the Blue Man Group on the How To Be a Megastar Tour, and provided vocals for the Schiller song Soleil De Nuit. He is the voice of Discovery Channel (France) and ESPN (France), and appears very regularly as a promo/ident voice on Sky, National Geographic Channel, CNN and MTV.

He has also contributed as a dubbing actor to the following movies:

- Vantage Point
- Casino Royale
- Botched
- Bon Voyage
- Hannibal Rising
- Children of Men
- The Queen
- The Da Vinci Code
- Munich
- Soundproof
- Kingdom of Heaven
- Master and Commander: The Far Side of the World
- Flyboys: A True Story of Courage
- Hotel Rwanda
- Troy
- Shooting Dogs
- Vanity Fair
- Phantom of The Opera
- Around the World in 80 Days
- Legionnaire

As a producer and casting director, he specialises in sourcing and casting actors (voiceover artists or visual actors) for the advertising and broadcast industries through Sounds Beautiful
