= Atemlos =

2010 album by Schiller

Box set by Schiller
- Released: 12 March 2010
- Recorded: 2010
- Genre: Pop, electronic
- Label: Island
- Producer: Christopher von Deylen

Schiller chronology
Sehnsucht Live (2008)	Atemlos (2010)	Atemlos Live (2010)

Atemlos (German for "Breathless") is the sixth studio album of German electronica and global pop artist Christopher von Deylen under his principal project, the band "Schiller". The album was released on 12 March 2010. The album contains 30 new compositions from Schiller, including two electronic symphonies in 5.1 surround sound. It was internationally marketed as Breathless.

Like Deylen's earlier albums, Atemlos features collaborations with other international artists. Anna Maria Mühe, Jaki Liebezeit, Odette Di Maio, Midge Ure, Kate Havnevik, Anggun, Lenka, Mia Bergström, Kim Sanders and Henree contribute vocals to the album. The first single, "Try", featuring Nadia Ali, was released three weeks before the official album launch date.

The album is inspired by Deylen's month-long voyage with the scientific research vessel Polarstern. To support the album, a tour of the same name was made between 14 and 30 May 2010.

The album achieved platinum status in Germany in 2016.

== Limited Super Deluxe Edition ==
A super deluxe edition box set of the album contained three discs (2 CD + 1 DVD).

== Track listing ==
=== Super Deluxe Edition ===
CD 01:

No.	Title	Writer(s)	Length
1.	"Willkommen (UK: Welcome)"	Deylen	1:06
2.	"Tiefblau (UK: Deep Blue)"	Deylen	4:43
3.	"Playing With Madness" (With Mia Bergström), Guitar: Andreas Binder, Drums: Ralf Gutske, Cello: Christian Kretschmar, Bass: Tissy Thiers)	Bergström, Deylen	4:56
4.	"Atemlos (UK: Breathless)"	Deylen	3:48
5.	"Try" (With Nadia Ali), Guitar: Andreas Binder)	Ali, Deylen	4:45
6.	"Unruhig Herz (UK: Restless Heart)" (With Anna Maria Mühe)	Deylen	2:28
7.	"Leidenschaft (UK: Passion)" (With Jaki Liebezeit)	Deylen	4:41
8.	"Blind" (With Anggun), Bass: Tissy Thiers)	Cipta Sasmi, Deylen	4:50
9.	"Soho"	Deylen	5:13
10.	"Let It Rise" (With Midge Ure), Guitar: Andreas Binder)	Ure, Deylen	3:56
11.	"Polarstern (UK: Polar Star)" (Drums: Ralf Gustke)	Deylen	4:31
12.	"Don't Go" (With Kate Havnevik))	Havnevik, Deylen	5:20
13.	"Moments" (Spoken words: Cliff Hewitt)	Deylen	2:04
14.	"Addicted" (With Lenka), Bass: Tissy Thiers)	Kripac, Deylen	4:26
15.	" Morgenland (UK: The Orient)" (Drums: Ralf Gustke)	Deylen	4:20
16.	"Lost Again" (With Odette Di Maio)	Deylen	5:46

CD 02:

No.	Title	Writer(s)	Length
1.	"La Mer (UK: The Sea)"	Deylen	4:06
2.	"Sunrise" (With Lenka)	Kripac, Deylen	6:13
3.	"Augenblick (UK: Moment)"	Deylen	2:05
4.	"I Will Follow You" (With Henree)	Olsen, Deylen	4:34
5.	"Opium" (With Jaki Liebezeit), Guitar: Andreas Binder)	Deylen	6:08
6.	"The Fire" (With Kate Havnevik)	Havnevik, Deylen	5:54
7.	"Un Solo Minuto (UK: A Single Moment)" (With Odette Di Maio)	Di Maio, Deylen	4:45
8.	"Salton Sea"	Deylen	4:53
9.	"Under My Skin" (With Kim Sanders), Guitar: Andreas Binder, Drums: Ralf Gustke)	Sanders, Deylen	5:03
10.	"Hochland (UK: Highlands)" (Cello: Christian Kretschmar)	Deylen	4:08
11.	"Himmelblau (UK: Sky Blue)"	Deylen	5:24
12.	"Always You" (With Anggun), Guitar: Andreas Binder, Bass: Tissy Thiers)	Cipta Sasmi, Deylen	4:38
13.	"Reprise"	Deylen	3:59

Disc 3 (DVD):
Elektronik-Symphonie

- Luft
- Wasser

Atemlos 5.1 (Audio Only)

- Willkommen
- Tiefblau
- Playing With Madness with Mia Bergström
- Polarstern
- Himmelblau
- Leidenschaft with Jaki Liebezeit
- Soho
- Hochland
- Always You feat. Anggun
- Reprise

Studiosession with Jaki Liebezeit

- Expedition into the Arctic Sea

Photo-Gallery

- Schiller
- Polarstern

== Charts ==
=== Year-end charts ===
Chart (2010)	Rank
German Albums Chart	30
