= Franziska Pigulla =

German actress and news presenter (1964–2019)

Franziska Pigulla (6 May 1964 – 23 February 2019) was a German actress, news presenter and voice actress.

== Biography ==
Pigulla was born in Neuss. After her graduation she studied Germanistics and Anglistics in Berlin. Later she took acting classes in Berlin and London.

=== Career ===
In London, she was a news presenter for the German language programme of the BBC. In 1990 she became a presenter of the German news network n-tv. With her deep voice she gained mainstream attention for dubbing Gillian Anderson in her role as FBI Special Agent Dana Scully in The X-Files. Furthermore, she dubbed Demi Moore (Disclosure, Indecent Proposal), Mercedes Ruehl (Last Action Hero), Téa Leoni (Deep Impact), Sharon Stone (Intersection), Robia LaMorte (Buffy the Vampire Slayer) and Naomi Campbell. She dubbed Jasmine Guy as the voice of Sawyer in the German dub of Cats Don't Dance.

Pigulla was the German voice of the character Nicole Collard in the video game series Broken Sword. In addition she was a voice-over in documentaries, pseudo-documentaries, TV-reports and advertising spots. As audiobook narrator she read books of Patricia Cornwell and Ken Follett among others. In the audio drama adaption of the German novel series Geisterjäger John Sinclair she played the role of Jane Collins. Together with her dubbing partner Benjamin Völz (David Duchovny) she had guest appearances in five music albums of the band Schiller.

=== Death ===
Pigulla died in Berlin on 23 February 2019.
