= Leben (surname) =

Leben, and its variant Leban, is a surname with different origins. As a habitation surname, it is derived from the village of Leybourne: ancestors of the Leben surname lived in that village in ancient Anglo-Saxon England.

== List of persons with the surname Leben ==
- Chris Leben (born 1980), Mixed martial arts fighter
- Steve Leben, judge on the Kansas Court of Appeals
