= Sehnsucht (Schiller album) =

Box set by Schiller
- Released: 22 February 2008
- Recorded: 2008
- Genre: Pop, electronic
- Length: 215:48
- Label: Island
- Producer: Christopher von Deylen

Schiller chronology
| Tagtraum (2006) | Sehnsucht (2008) | Sehnsucht Live (2008) |

Sehnsucht (UK: Desire) is the fifth studio album by the electronic project Schiller undertaken by German musician, composer and producer Christopher Von Deylen. The album was released on 22 February 2008. The album features collaboration with several established artists like Xavier Naidoo, Jaël, Kim Sanders, and Klaus Schulze among others.

The album was launched in four versions: a limited three-disc Super Deluxe Edition, a two-disc Deluxe Edition, a Standard Edition and a Double Vinyl Edition. The Super Deluxe edition contains 31 compositions from Christopher Von Deylen, mostly new. The DVD includes music videos, concert footage and a documentary. The two-disc Deluxe Edition contains selected songs from the Super Deluxe Edition and the DVD.

== Track listing ==
=== Super Deluxe Edition ===
CD 01:

| No. | Title | Writer(s) | Length |
|---|---|---|---|
| 1. | "Willkommen (UK: Welcome)" | Von Deylen | 1:08 |
| 2. | "Herzschlag (UK: Heartbeat)" (Drums: Ralf Gustke, Stringed Instruments: Mickey Meinert) | Von Deylen | 4:09 |
| 3. | "Denn wer liebt (UK: The One That Loves)" (with Anna Maria Mühe), Cello: Christian Kretschmar) | Von Deylen | 3:56 |
| 4. | "Sehnsucht (UK: Desire)" (with Xavier Naidoo), Bass: Tissy Thiers) | Xavier Naidoo, von Deylen | 3:57 |
| 5. | "Wehmut (UK: Wistfulness)" | Von Deylen | 4:03 |
| 6. | "Black" (with Jette von Roth) | Von Roth, von Deylen | 4:59 |
| 7. | "Mitternacht (UK: Midnight)" | Von Deylen | 4:15 |
| 8. | "Let Me Love You" (with Kim Sanders), Drums: Ralf Gustke, Stringed Instruments: Mickey Minert, Bass: Tissy Thiers) | Sanders, von Deylen | 6:24 |
| 9. | "Nacht (UK: Night)" (with Ben Becker)) | Von Deylen | 2:18 |
| 10. | "Fate" (with Isis Gee) | Tamara Diane Wimer, von Deylen | 3:56 |
| 11. | "Porque te vas (UK: Because You Are Leaving)" (with Ana Torroja), Bass: Tissy Thiers) | Federico Monreal, von Deylen | 4:34 |
| 12. | "In der weite (UK: In The Scope)" (with Anna Maria Mühe), Symphonic: The German Film Orchestra from Babelsberg) | Von Deylen | 5:11 |
| 13. | "Sommernacht (UK: Summernight)" (Drums: Ralf Gustke) | Von Deylen | 4:39 |
| 14. | "Everything" (with Helen Boulding), Drums: Ralf Gustke, Stringed Instruments: Mickey Meinert) | Johnny McDaid, Boulding, von Deylen | 4:09 |
| 15. | "Lichter (UK: Lights)" | Von Deylen | 4:43 |
| 16. | "Ile aye (UK: Our World)" (with Stephenie Coker) | Coker, von Deylen | 4:13 |
| 17. | "Once Upon a Time" | Von Deylen | 2:39 |

CD 02:

| No. | Title | Writer(s) | Length |
|---|---|---|---|
| 1. | "Der kuss (UK: The Kiss)" (with Anna Maria Mühe) | Von Deylen | 1:45 |
| 2. | "Wunschtraum (UK: Pipedream / Wishful Dream)" | Von Deylen | 4:32 |
| 3. | "Tired" (with Jaël), Drums: Ralf Gustke, Stringed Instruments: Mickey Meinert) | Rahel Krebs, von Deylen | 4:45 |
| 4. | "Lichtung (UK: Clearing)" | Von Deylen | 6:03 |
| 5. | "Breathe" (with September) | J. von Der Burg, N. von Der Burg, A. Bhagavan, von Deylen | 4:12 |
| 6. | "Zenit (Ausschnitt) (UK: Zenit (Cut))" (with Klaus Schulze) | Schulze, von Deylen | 12:48 |
| 7. | "In the Dark" (with Jette von Roth), Stringed Instruments: Mickey Meinert) | Von Roth, von Deylen | 5:11 |
| 8. | "Tagtraum (UK: Daydream)" | Von Deylen | 4:47 |
| 9. | "Destiny" (with Despina Vandi) | Phoebus, von Deylen | 4:13 |
| 10. | "White" | Von Deylen | 2:01 |
| 11. | "Lonely" (with Damae), Stringed Instruments: Mickey Meinert, Bass: Tissy Thiers) | Daniela Marina Elisabeth Klein, Dee Jacobee, von Deylen | 3:46 |
| 12. | "Sehnsucht (Reprise) / (UK: Desire (Reprise)" (Bass: Tissy Thiers) | Xavier Naidoo, von Deylen | 3:52 |
| 13. | "Vor der zeit (UK: Prematurely)" (with Ben Becker) | Von Deylen | 3:06 |
| 14. | "Forever" (with Kim Sanders), Stringed Instruments: Mickey Meinert) | Sanders, von Deylen | 5:36 |

DVD:

1. Denn wer liebt (with Anna Maria Mühe) (04:44)
2. Herzschlag (Video) (04:43)
3. Wunschtraum (04:33)
4. Let Me Love You (Video) (05:07)
5. Everything (04:01)
6. Mitternacht (04:19)
7. Sommernacht (04:40)
8. In der weite (05:39)
9. Wehmut (04:32)
10. Forever (05:00)

BERLIN-CALCUTTA

1. Zenit (with Klaus Schulze) (32:43)

INTERVIEW

PHOTOS

LIVE IN KIEW

1. Schiller (06:15)
2. I Saved You (05:35)
3. Irrlicht (05:56)
4. Nachtflug (06:53)

=== Deluxe edition ===
CD

1. Willkommen (01:07)
2. Wunschtraum (04:31)
3. Let Me Love You (with Kim Sanders) (06:38)
4. Denn Wer Liebt (with Anna Maria Mühe) (03:59)
5. Sehnsucht (with Xavier Naidoo) (03:57)
6. Wehmut (04:16)
7. In The Dark (with Jette Von Roth) (05:00)
8. Vor Der Zeit (with Ben Becker) (03:18)
9. Tired (with Jaël) (04:45)
10. Herzschlag (04:40)
11. Porque Te Vas (with Ana Torroja) (04:27)
12. Everything (with Helen Boulding) (04:00)
13. Zenit | Ausschnitt (with Klaus Schulze) (03:57)
14. In Der Weite (with Anna Maria Mühe) (05:11)
15. Sommernacht (04:41)
16. Destiny (with Despina Vandi & Phoebus) (04:13)
17. Mitternacht (04:26)
18. Fate (with Isis Gee) (04:25)

DVD

1. Herzschlag (Video) (04:43)
2. Wunschtraum (Video) (04:33)
3. Let Me Love You (Video) (05:07)
4. Everything (Video) (04:01)
5. Sommernacht (Video) (04:40)
6. In Der Weite (Video) (05:39)
7. Wehmut (Video) (04:32)
8. Forever (Video) (05:00)
9. Berlin Calcutta | Teil 1, 2 & 3 (12:20)
10. Zenit (with Klaus Schulze) (32:43)
11. Schiller (Live in Kiew) (06:15)
12. I Saved You (Live in Kiew) (05:35)

=== Standard edition ===
1. Wilkommen
2. Herzschlag
3. Denn Wer Liebt (with Anna Maria Muehe)
4. Sehnsucht (with Xavier Naidoo)
5. Wehmut
6. Black (with Jette von Roth)
7. You (with Colbie Caillat)
8. Let Me Love you (with Kim Sanders)
9. Wunschtraum
10. Time For Dreams (with Lang Lang)
11. In Der Weite (with Anna Maria Muehe)
12. Sommernacht
13. Tired (with Jael)
14. Vor Der Zeit (with Ben Becker)
15. White
16. Mitternacht
17. Ile Aye (with Stephenie Coker)
18. Zenit (with Klaus Schulze)
19. Forever (with Kim Sanders)

=== Double vinyl edition ===
A1

1. Willkommen (01:06)
2. Wunschtraum (04:36)
3. Let Me Love You (with Kim Sanders) (06:34)
4. Denn Wer Liebt (with Anna Maria Mühe) (04:00)
5. Sehnsucht (with Xavier Naidoo) (03:58)
6. Wehmut (04:18)

B1

1. In The Dark (with Jette Von Roth) (05:00)
2. Vor Der Zeit (with Ben Becker) (03:19)
3. Tired (with Jaël) (04:46)
4. Herzschlag (04:41)
5. Porque Te Vas (with Ana Torroja) (04:30)

A2

1. Everything (with Helen Boulding) (04:01)
2. Zenit | Ausschnitt (with Klaus Schulze) (08:24)
3. In Der Weite (with Anna Maria Mühe) (05:15)
4. Sommernacht (04:54)

B2

1. Destiny (with Despina Vandi & Phoebus) (04:18)
2. Heaven (with Bernstein) (Exclusive bonustrack) (03:54)
3. Mitternacht (04:15)
4. Tired of Being Alone (with Tarja Turunen) (04:09)
5. Fate (with Isis Gee) (04:28)

== Year-end charts ==
| Chart (2008) | Rank |
|---|---|
| German Albums Chart | 16 |

== Certifications ==
| Country | Certification (sales thresholds) |
|---|---|
| Germany | Platinum |
