= Morgenstund =

Studio album by Schiller
- Released: 22 March 2019
- Recorded: 2017–2018
- Genre: Electronica; ambient; synthpop
- Length: 3:35:47
- Label: RCA Deutschland (Sony Music Entertainment)
- Producer: Christopher von Deylen

Schiller chronology
Future (2016)	Morgenstund (2019)	Colors (2020)

Morgenstund is the tenth studio album of the music project Schiller created by the German electronic musician Christopher von Deylen. The album was released on 22 March 2019. On this album, Schiller has collaborated with the singers Nena, Tricia McTeague, Yalda Abbasi, Schwarz, Jhyve and Rebecca Ferguson, the musicians Giorgio Moroder and Jan Blomqvist and the music group Tangerine Dream.

It was released in different editions, including the limited "Ultra Deluxe Edition".

A new studio album was originally scheduled for autumn 2018. The album was produced between 2017 and 2018. On 3 September 2018, Schiller announced officially the release of a new album and the rescheduling of the release date to spring 2019. The name of the album "Morgenstund" and its cover artwork were announced and revealed on 14 September 2018 on Facebook and YouTube. Von Deylen described the production of the album with the words: "Ich freue mich sehr auf "Morgenstund". Selten hat mir die Arbeit an einem neuen Werk soviel Freude gemacht". (Translation: I'm really looking forward to "Morgenstund". Rarely, working on a new work has given me so much pleasure.)

A first song from the album, "Morgenstund" with singer Nena, was released with different remixes on Spotify on 22 February 2019.

The first music video of the album, "Universe", had its world premiere on 2 March 2019 on YouTube. The song was released then also on Spotify. A third song, "Avalanche" with SCHWARZ, was released on 8 March 2019. A second music video, Das Goldene Tor with Yalda Abbasi, had its world premiere on 9 March 2019 on YouTube and was also put on Spotify. On 20 March 2019, the music video of Berlin Tehran had its world premiere exclusively on the homepage of the German news magazine Stern. The song "Berlin Tehran" was first live performed during Schillers concert tour through the Iran in 2018. The complete album with the music videos to Universe, Das Goldene Tor, Shangri La, New Day, and Berlin Tehran was released on 22 March 2019 in the German-speaking countries. It was available on Spotify since 22 March 2019.

The cover artwork shows two hands covered in yellow liquid color. The same cover art is also used for the songs of the album, but in different colors.

== Track listing ==
The album includes:

CD 1 - Morgenstern

No.	Title	Length
1.	"Willkommen"	0:37
2.	"Harmonia"	6:02
3.	"Universe" (with Tricia McTeague)	7:24
4.	"Dreamcatcher" (with Jhyve)	3:49
5.	"Baum des Lebens"	5:50
6.	"Avalanche" (with SCHWARZ)	5:36
7.	"Das goldene Tor" (with Yalda Abbasi)	6:20
8.	"Berlin Tehran" (Miniatur)	1:08
9.	"In Between" (with Jan Blomqvist)	4:45
10.	"Morgenstund" (with Nena)	5:04
11.	"Shangri La"	5:25
12.	"Lichtjahre" (with Giorgio Moroder)	4:28
13.	"New Day" (with SCHWARZ)	6:06
14.	"Over You"	4:13
15.	"Morgenstern (Ausschnitt)" (with Tangerine Dream)	5:06
16.	"Love" (with Rebecca Ferguson)	8:50

CD 2 - Voyage: Panta Rhei

1. Aurora
2. Kronos
3. Poseidon
4. Shangri La (Orchester Version)
5. Aphrodite
6. Berlin Tehran
7. Die Farben der Nacht
8. Morgenstern, Pt. 1 (with Tangerine Dream)
9. Morgenstern, Pt. 2 (with Tangerine Dream)
10. Morgenstern, Pt. 3 (with Tangerine Dream)
11. Morgenstern, Pt. 4 (with Tangerine Dream)
12. Morgenstern, Pt. 5 (with Tangerine Dream)
13. Morgenstern, Pt. 6 (with Tangerine Dream)
14. Morgenstern, Pt. 7 (with Tangerine Dream)
15. Morgenstern, Pt. 8 (with Tangerine Dream)
16. Morgenstern, Pt. 9 (with Tangerine Dream)

=== Ultra deluxe edition ===
The limited Ultra deluxe edition includes the bonus CD, "Wanderlust".

Bonus CD - Wanderlust

1. Wanderlust I
2. Wanderlust II
3. Wanderlust III
4. Wanderlust IV
5. Wanderlust V
6. Wanderlust VI
7. Wanderlust VII
8. Wanderlust VIII
9. Wanderlust IX
10. Wanderlust X

== Music videos ==
- Universe
- Das Goldene Tor
- In Between
- Berlin Tehran
- New Day
- Morgenstern (TBA)
- Avalanche (TBA)

== Credits and personnel ==
- Christopher von Deylen – music and production of all tracks
- Nena – vocals on "Morgenstund"
- Tricia McTeague – lyrics and vocals on "Universe"
- Yalda Abbasi – vocals on "Das Goldene Tor"
- Roland Mayer de Voltaire (Schwarz) – vocals on "Avalanche"; "New Day"
- Jhyve – vocals on "Dreamcatcher"
- Rebecca Ferguson – vocals on "Love"
- Giorgio Moroder – music on "Lichtjahre"
- Jan Blomqvist – music on "In Between"
- David Oesterling – music on "Morgenstund"
- Jan Weigel – music on "Morgenstund"
- Thorsten Quaeschning (Tangerine Dream) - music on "Morgenstern"
- Mike Rutherford - guitar on "Harmonia"
- Gary Wallis, percussion

=== Instruments ===
- Pouya Saraei – santour on "Berlin Tehran"
- Pirooz Arjmand – daf drum on "Berlin Tehran"

== Charts ==
Chart (2019)	Peak position
Austrian Albums (Ö3 Austria)	10
German Albums (Offizielle Top 100)	1
Swiss Albums (Schweizer Hitparade)	5
