= Marcus Sternberg =

German music video director (born 1965)

Marcus Sternberg (born 14 September 1965) is a German music video director and creative-producer.

== Biography ==
Sternberg studied at the International Film School in London and has lived in Paris and Buenos Aires. Besides music videos he also directs commercials and arts & culture films. He received an ECHO Award in the category Best National Video for his work on No Angels' video for "Something about Us."

Slant Magazine voted his Run DMC vs. Jason Nevins "It's Like That" one of the 100 Greatest Music Videos. "Killer choreography and silky camera moves are director Marcus Sternberg's visual weapons of choice."

His work includes story-videos featuring German film actors Helmut Berger, Hanno Koffler, Anna-Maria Mühe, Esther Schweins, Lea Drinda, Ben Becker and Franz Dinda.

== Filmography ==
=== Selected music videos ===
- Anastacia – Best Of You (2012)
- Anastacia – Stupid Little Things (2014)
- Melanie C - Rock Me
- Run DMC vs. Jason Nevins – It's Like That
- Schiller & Colbie Caillat – You
- Nena & Helmut Berger – Besser Geht's Nicht
- MarieMarie – Under The Neon Sky
- Nena – Das Ist Nicht Alles
- Kosheen – Guilty
- Paul van Dyk & Saint Etienne – Tell Me Why (The Riddle)
- Nena – 99 Red Balloons 2002
- Lexington Bridge feat. Snoop Dogg – Real Man
- Aura Dione – Something From Nothing
- Xavier Naidoo – Wo willst du hin (with Esther Schweins, Steffen Wink)
- Sugarplum Fairy – Sail Beyond Doubt
- Söhne Mannheims – Dein Glück liegt mir am Herzen
- Dante Thomas – Caught In The Middle
- Fettes Brot – Nordish by Nature
- Nena & Heppner – Haus Der Drei Sonnen
- Ich + Ich – So soll es bleiben
- Frida Gold – Unsere Liebe Ist Aus Gold
- Schiller & Xavier Naidoo – Sehnsucht
- No Angels – Something About Us
- Schiller & Thomas D. – Die Nacht
- Kim Frank – Lara
- Yvonne Catterfeld + Eric Benét – Where does the love goes
- Christina Stürmer – Engel Fliegen Einsam
- Nena – Leuchtturm 2002
- Schiller & Heppner – Dream of you
- Echt – Wo bist du jetzt?
- De Phazz – The Mambo Craze
- Jam & Spoon – Stella

=== Selected commercials ===
- Adidas Brand Summit Film 2008
- 11899 / Nena
- Bärenmarke
- Reno / Nena
- Weisser Riese / Nena
