= Isgaard =

- Born: 1972; Husum, Germany
- Genres: Pop
- Occupation: Singer
- Instrument: Vocal
- Years active: 2003–present
- Website: www.isgaard.com/en

Isgaard Marke (born 1972 in Husum, Schleswig-Holstein, Germany) is a classically trained singer, who in 2003 participated in the German pre-selection for the Eurovision Song Contest and reached seventh place with the song Golden Key. Her album of the same name achieved moderate success in Germany and in the Philippines.

== Discography ==
- 2003: Golden Key
- 2004: Secret Gaarden
- 2008: Wooden Houses
- 2012: Playing God
- 2014: Naked
- 2015: The Early Days
- 2016: WHITEOUT
- 2019: Human
