= Kim Sanders =

American singer-songwriter

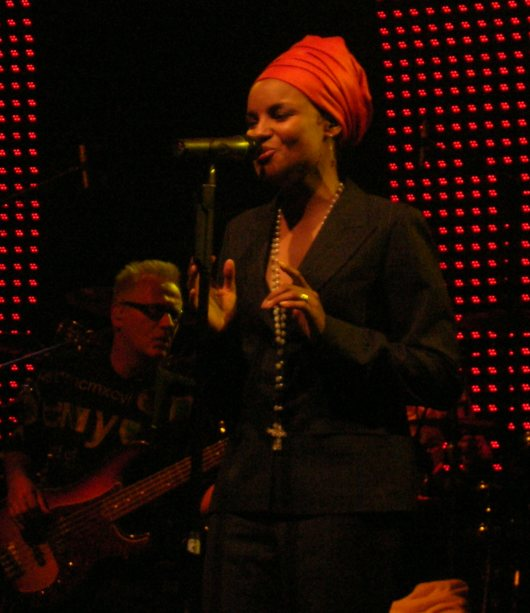
- Sanders performing in Berlin, 2006

Background information
- Born: October 24, 1968 (age 58); East Chicago, Indiana, U.S.
- Genres: Europop, Eurodance, trance, house, ambient
- Occupations: Singer, songwriter
- Years active: 1993–present
- Labels: Columbia Germany, Care Music, Island Records Germany
- Website: www.kimsanders.de

Kim Sanders (born October 24, 1968) is an American singer and songwriter based in Germany. Sanders began to release singles as a solo artist in 1994 and wrote songs for other musicians. She also provided vocals for a number of Captain Hollywood Project's songs, including the 1993 singles All I Want and Impossible. In 1993 and 1994, she released three of her singles, "Show Me", "Tell Me That You Want Me" and "Ride". In 1998, Sanders became the front-woman of the German dance project Culture Beat, on the album Metamorphosis. In 2003, she released her debut album Pretty on Edge, which failed to enter the charts due to the record company placing the incorrect bar code on the album. Although this was a huge setback for Sanders' solo career, she has since collaborated with artists such as Schiller, Aural Float, Stefanie Heinzmann, Till Brönner, Nicola Conte and Wolfgang Haffner. Her solo album A Closer Look was released in 2009 with C.A.R.E. Music Group and won the Preis Der Deutschen Schallplatten Kritik (German Recording Critics Prize) in the category of Black Music, in February 2010.

In December 2011, Sanders became one of the contestants on German reality talent show The Voice of Germany. In the first season of the show, Sanders performed her cover versions of "All That She Wants", "Killing Me Softly with His Song" and "Empire State of Mind (Part II) Broken Down". She ultimately became one of the four finalists in the first season of the show but she and the other two contestants lost to Ivy Quainoo, with Sanders coming in second.

== Discography ==
=== Albums ===
| Year | Album details | Peak chart positions |
| Year | Album details | GER |
|---|---|---|
| 2003 | Pretty on Edge: Released: June 2, 2003; Label: Island (Universal Germany); Formats: CD, cassette, LP | — |
| 2009 | A Closer Look: Released: November 6, 2009; Label: Care Music (Edel); Formats: CD, digital download | — |

=== Solo singles ===
| Year | Single | Peak chart positions | | Album |
| Year | Single | GER | NDL | Album |
|---|---|---|---|---|
| 1993 | "Show Me" | 33 | 33 | Non-album singles |
| 1994 | "Ride" | 87 | — | Non-album singles |
| 1994 | "Tell Me That You Want Me" | — | — | Non-album singles |
| 1996 | "Jealousy" | — | — | Non-album singles |
| 2001 | "Food for Thoughts" | — | — | Non-album singles |
| 2025 | "Let Me Love You" (feat. Torsten Goods) | — | — | Non-album singles |
| 2003 | "Something About You" | — | — | Pretty on Edge |
| 2003 | "Tricky" | — | — | Pretty on Edge |
| 2012 | "Empire State of Mind (Part II) Broken Down" | 54 | — | The Voice of Germany |
| 2012 | "Killing Me Softly with His Song" | 57 | — | The Voice of Germany |
| 2012 | "Haunted" | 13 | — | The Voice of Germany |

=== Featured singles ===
| Year | Single | Peak chart positions | Album |
| Year | Single | GER | Album |
|---|---|---|---|
| 1995 | "Out of My Head"; Steven Levis Project feat. Kim Sanders and Nosie Katzmann | — | Non-album single |
| 2001 | "Dancing with Loneliness"; Schiller with Kim Sanders | 73 | Weltreise |
| 2001 | "Distance"; Schiller with Kim Sanders | — | Weltreise |
| 2004 | "Aus Gold"; Milù with Kim Sanders & Peter Heppner | 73 | Non-album single |
| 2005 | "I Know"; Schiller with Kim Sanders | — | Tag und Nacht |
| 2005 | "I Saved You"; Schiller with Kim Sanders | — | Tag und Nacht |
| 2007 | "Lightstorm"; Schiller with Kim Sanders | — | Non-album single |
| 2007 | "Nature Boy"; Till Brönner feat. Kim Sanders & Don Grusin | — | Non-album single |
| 2008 | "Let Me Love You"; Schiller with Kim Sanders | 63 | Sehnsucht |
| 2008 | "Forever"; Schiller with Kim Sanders | — | Sehnsucht |
| 2010 | "Under My Skin"; Schiller with Kim Sanders | — | Atemlos |
