= Peter Heppner =

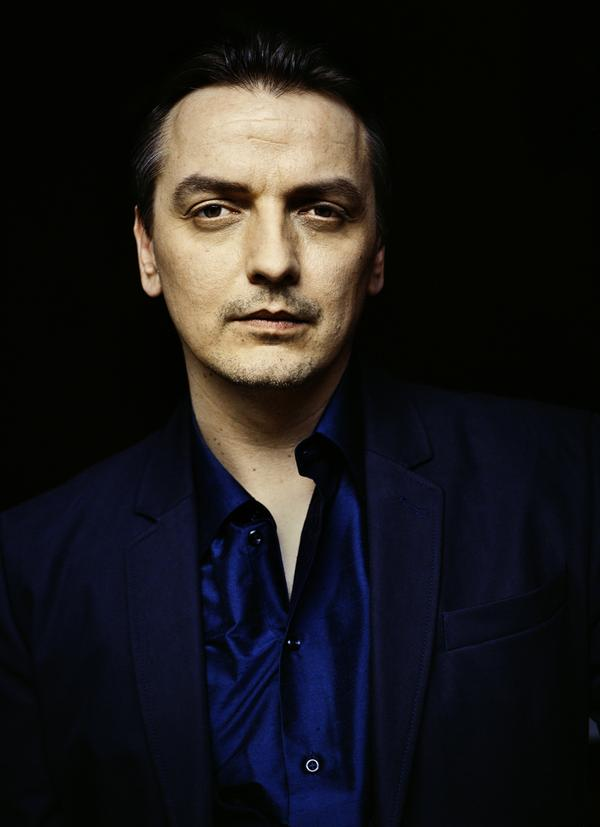
- Peter Heppner 2008

Background information
- Born: 7 September 1967 (age 59)
- Origin: Hamburg, Germany
- Genres: Synthpop, dark wave, electronica
- Occupations: Vocalist, songwriter
- Instrument: Vocals
- Years active: 1987–present
- Label: Universal Music Germany
- Website: www.peter-heppner.com

Peter Heppner (born 7 September 1967 in Hamburg) is the former lead singer of the German electronica/synth pop band Wolfsheim, and has collaborated with many other electronic music acts, such as Paul van Dyk, Schiller, Camouflage, and Goethes Erben.

== Career ==
Being singer and songwriter for Wolfsheim since 1987, his first commercial success was in 1991 releasing the single "The Sparrows and the Nightingales". In 1998, he had a big charts success with NDW star Joachim Witt and their duet "Die Flut". In the years following, his notability as a singer increased. Collaborating with Schiller, he achieved international chart hits with "Dream of You" (2001) and "Leben... I Feel You" in 2004. In the same year, he released the song "Wir Sind Wir" with Paul van Dyk. Although the song was controversial, the artists recorded another version together with the Filmorchester Babelsberg which was performed at the official ceremony for the Day of German Unity on 3 October 2005 in Potsdam. A more recent project with miLù (Anke Hachfeld, the singer of the group Mila Mar) and Kim Sanders formerly of Culture Beat spawned the single "Aus Gold", intended to support Afghan poorhouses in conjunction with Deutsches Rotes Kreuz (German Red Cross). Another collaboration was with previous Wolfsheim producer, José Alvarez-Brill, on the song "Vielleicht", featured on the album Alvarez Presents Zeitmaschine Remixed (2005).

Heppner's first solo effort Solo was released in Germany on 12 September 2008 through Warner Music. The songs on the disc were produced by Peter-John Vettese as well as Alvarez-Brill. The album peaked at #9 on the German charts and was preceded by the single "Alleinesein" on 5 September 2008.

In 2010, he released the song "Haus der drei Sonnen" with German singer Nena, a remake of her 1985 single (known in English as "It's All In The Game").

Peter Heppner's second solo album, My Heart of Stone, was released on 18 May 2012 through Universal Music (DE). My Heart of Stone entered the German album charts at #6 and was preceded by the online-single and video "God Smoked" in April 2012 and the regular single "Meine Welt" on 4 May 2012.

In 2012, he also performed on two duets with Kim Sanders ("Deserve To Be Alone") and German singer Marianne Rosenberg ("Genau Entgegengesetzt").

As a thank-you gift for his fans, he released an English and a German version of the online-single "Dream of Christmas / Traum von Weihnachten" in December 2012.

On 8 February 2014, he was a guest singer on the stage at German synthpop trio Camouflage's 30th anniversary concert that was held in Dresden, Germany. He performed a duet with lead vocal Marcus Meyn on the song "That Smiling Face", the band's 1988 single released from their first studio album "Voices and Images".

In 2018, he released the albums Confessions & Doubts and TanzZwang (the latter being a remix album). The Album's first single, titled Was bleibt? is another duet with Joachim Witt.

In January 2025, the single, "Weiß wie Schnee", a collaboration with German singer Sotiria Schenk, was released.

== Discography ==
Studio albums

Year	Title	Chart place			Remarks
Year	Title	Germany DE	Austria AT	Switzerland CH	Remarks
2008	solo	9 (6 Wo.)	—	—	12 September 2008
2012	My Heart of Stone	6 (5 Wo.)	47 (1 Wo.)	64 (1 Wo.)	18 May 2012
2018	Confessions & Doubts	11 (... Wo.)	—	—	28 September 2018

== Concert tours ==
- 01.2009–04.2009: solo Tour
- 01.2010–10.2010: Clubtour
- 11.2012–04.2013: My Heart of Stone Tour
- 11.2014–09.2015: Peter Heppner Akustik
- 10.2017–12.2017: 30 Years of Heppner
- 11.2018–04.2019: Confessions & Doubts Tour
- 01.09.2022-14.02.2022: Peter Heppner Akustik 2022
- 09.2022: TanzZwang Tour (interrupted and postponed due to COVID-19 pandemic), resumed on 23.09.2022-5.11.2022

== Awards ==
- ECHO Pop
  - 2002: „Dance/Techno Künstler/in oder Gruppe National“ (Dream of You)
