= Schiller (band) =

German band

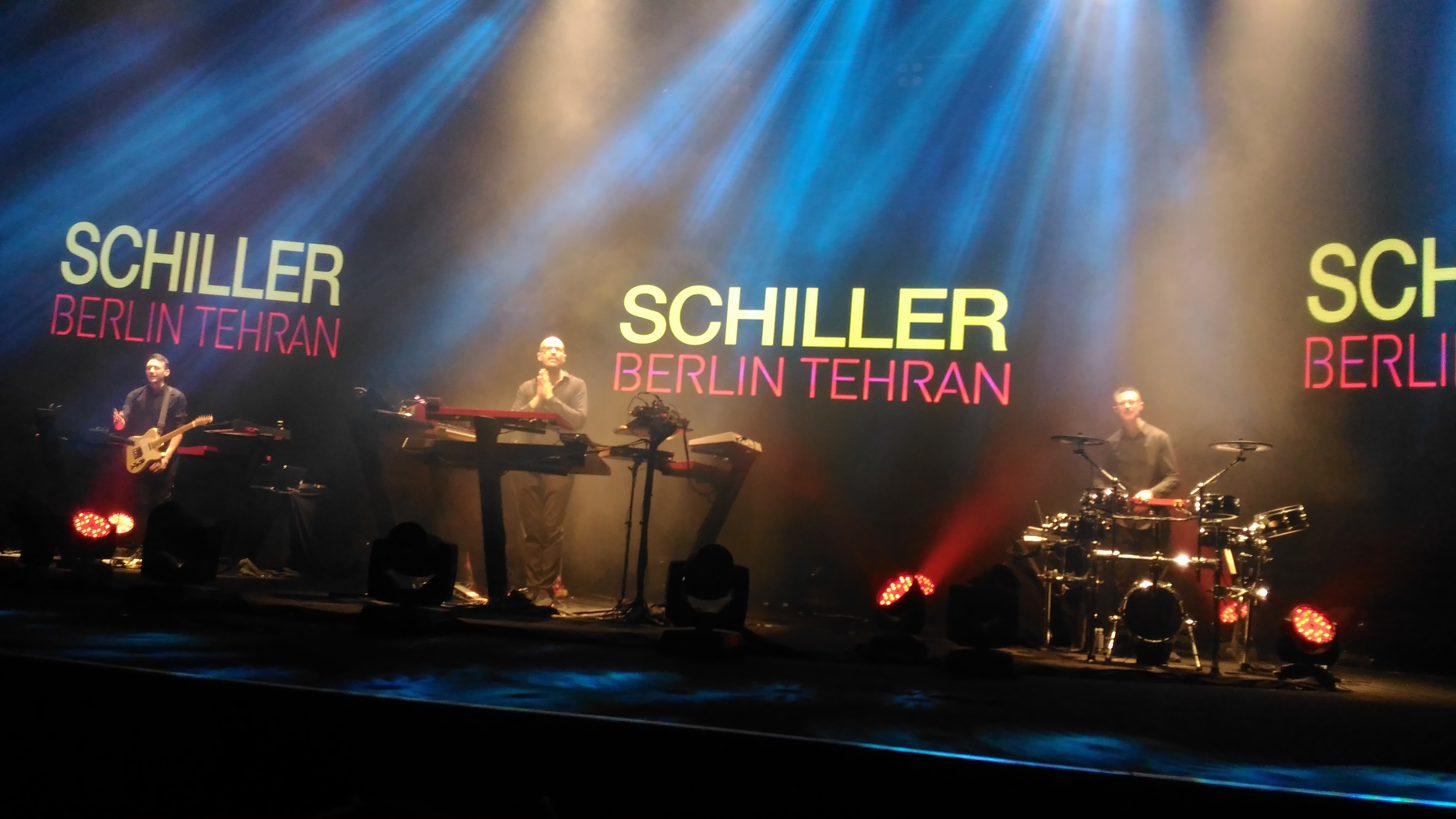
- Schiller in 2018

Background information
- Genres: Electropop, ambient, new-age, trance
- Years active: 1998–present
- Labels: Universal, Polydor, Radikal, Deutsche Grammophon
- Members: Christopher von Deylen
- Past members: Mirko von Schlieffen
- Website: schillermusic.com

Schiller (German pronunciation: [ˈʃɪlɐ]) is a German electronic music act. It was formed in 1998 and is named after the German poet and dramatist Friedrich Schiller. Originally, Schiller was a duo consisting of Christopher von Deylen (German: [ˈdaɪlən]) and Mirko von Schlieffen. Around 2001 or 2002, von Schlieffen left the band, leaving von Deylen as its sole member.

Schiller won the ECHO award in 2002 for the Best Dance Single of the Year with "Dream of You". Schiller has sold over seven million albums worldwide.

Vocals for Schiller productions are sung by guest artists, including Cristina Scabbia of Lacuna Coil, Samu Haber of Sunrise Avenue, Sarah Brightman, Moya Brennan of Clannad, Midge Ure of Ultravox, Andrea Corr of The Corrs, Colbie Caillat, Sarah Howells of Paper Aeroplanes, Ben Becker, Peter Heppner of synthpop band Wolfsheim, Xavier Naidoo, Arlissa, Maya Saban, Kim Sanders formerly of Culture Beat, Ana Torroja of the Spanish pop group Mecano, Tarja Turunen formerly of symphonic metal group Nightwish, Despina Vandi, Alexander Veljanov of Darkwave group Deine Lakaien, Swedish singer September, French voice artist Pierre Maubouché, Nena, and Meredith Call. Other musicians that have collaborated with Schiller include Anggun, Lang Lang, Klaus Schulze, Mike Oldfield, Helen Boulding, Kate Havnevik, Pouya Saraei, Damae of Fragma, Tangerine Dream, Jaël of Swiss band Lunik, Stephanie Coker, and German actress Anna Maria Mühe. Vocals for Schiller productions are also sung by guest artists including Yulia Sanina of The Hardkiss, Marian Gold, and Ukrainian producer 8Kays.

== Career ==
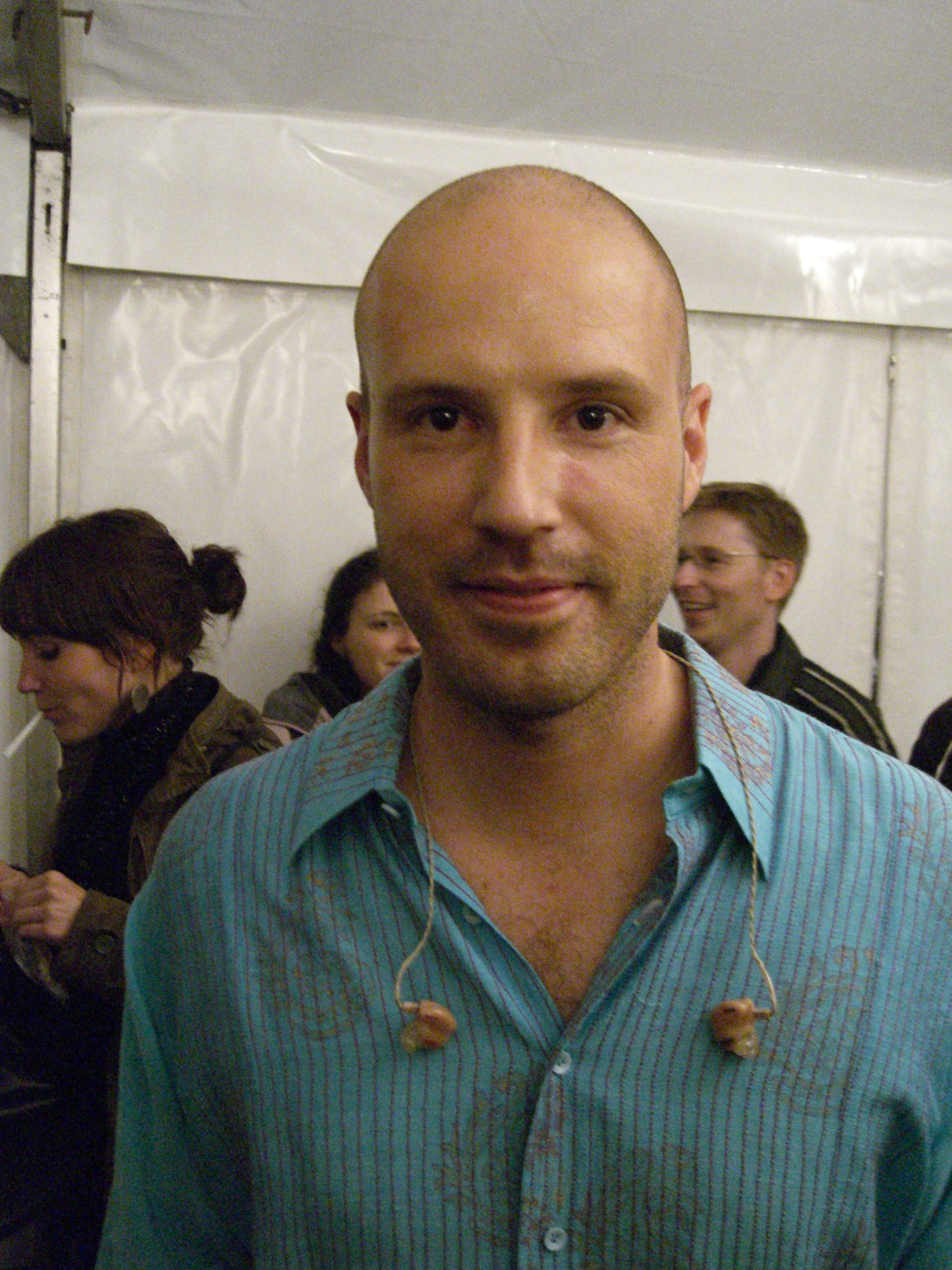
Christopher von Deylen

Schiller started as a duo, formed by Christopher von Deylen and Mirko von Schlieffen in 1998. Their first single was "Das Glockenspiel". A remixed version by DJ Tiesto was released in 2001.

On 19 August 1999, their first full album, Zeitgeist, was launched. It was a mixture of ambient trance music and ambient chillout music. It was followed by Weltreise (Voyage), which was released on 30 July 2001. This album featured the single "Dream of You" (with Peter Heppner), which won the ECHO award in 2002 for the Best Dance Single of the Year.

Since Schlieffen wanted to focus mostly on trance music, while Deylen wanted a more eclectic electronic sound, the duo split after their second album Weltreise.

The third studio album, Leben (Life), was issued on 13 October 2003. It included the single "Leben... I Feel You", featuring Peter Heppner. Maya Saban, Sarah Brightman, Alexander Veljanov (from Deine Lakaien), Kim Sanders, and Mila Mar singer Anke Hachfeld (credited as Mila Mar) also performed vocals on the album.

Leben was followed by Tag und Nacht (Day and Night), released on 28 October 2005. Mike Oldfield, Moya Brennan, Kim Sanders, Jette von Roth, and Thomas D. collaborated on it.

Schiller's fifth album, Sehnsucht (Desire) was released on 22 February 2008. Sehnsucht was simultaneously released in two formats and in three editions. It has sold over 100,000 copies, and received a golden certification. Sehnsucht was internationally released under the name Desire on 26 May 2008.

Schiller's sixth studio album, Atemlos (Breathless), was released on 12 March 2010. It debuted at second position on German Charts and was the highest entry for a domestic album for the week. The English edition of the album Atemlos reached until number 3 in the chart of IFPI in Greece. The single "Try" featured Nadia Ali.

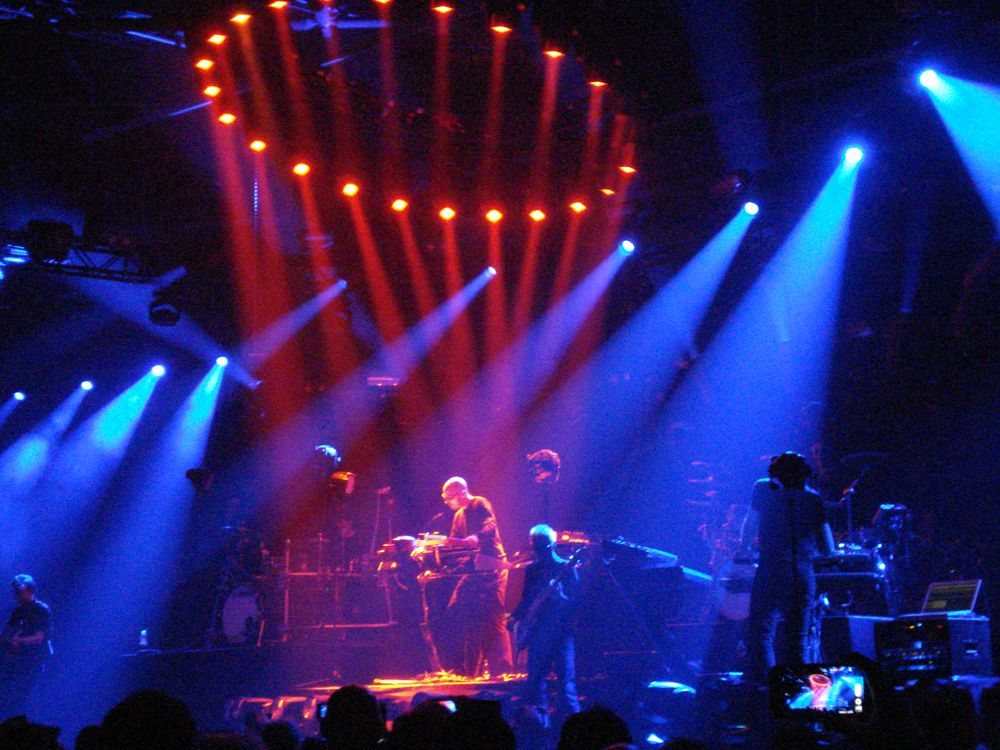
Schiller live in 2012

On 5 October 2012, the seventh studio album, Sonne (Sun), was released. The next album was Opus, issued on 30 August 2013. On 26 February 2016, Future was released. Schiller's tenth studio album, Morgenstund, was released on 22 March 2019. It included collaborations with Iranian artists.

In 2021, Schiller teamed up with Alphaville and released a new version of their "Summer in Berlin" song (from the Forever Young album) as Schiller x Alphaville.

In 2023, Schiller released the studio album Illuminate, which reached number one on the German charts. This was followed by the album Euphoria in January 2026, which featured collaborations with Yulia Sanina and 8Kays.

=== Music licensing ===
Maserati has used three of Schiller's songs: "Drifting and Dreaming" with Jette von Roth for their promotional video of the Maserati GranTurismo, "Sommernacht" (Summer Night) for their video on the GranTurismo S high performance version, and "Let Me Love You" with Kim Sanders for their Quattroporte high performance sedan.

In 2002, Jaguar produced a promotional DVD for the S Type and set it to the track "Ein schöner Tag" ("A Beautiful Day") by Schiller.

== Discography ==
The original German releases are under various subsidiaries of Universal Music Group, such as Polydor Records Germany. In the U.S., Schiller has been signed to several independent record labels, including Radikal Records for Zeitgeist, Voyage, and Life; 4 West Records for Day and Night; and OK! Good Records for Breathless.

=== Studio albums ===
==== German releases ====
English translation in parentheses.

- 1999 – Zeitgeist (Spirit of the Time)
- 2001 – Weltreise (Voyage)
- 2003 – Leben (Life)
- 2005 – Tag und Nacht (Day and Night)
- 2008 – Sehnsucht (Desire)
- 2010 – Atemlos (Breathless)
- 2012 – Sonne (Sun)
- 2013 – Opus
- 2016 – Future
- 2019 – Morgenstund (Early Morning)
- 2020 – Colors (as Christopher von Deylen)
- 2021 – Summer in Berlin
- 2021 – Berlin Moskau: The Ultimate Experience
- 2021 – Epic
- 2023 – Illuminate
- 2026 – Euphoria

All albums received special edition releases alongside its standard releases.

==== US releases ====
- 2001 – Zeitgeist
- 2002 – Voyage
- 2004 – Life
- 2005 – Prologue (previously Germany concert sales only)
- 2007 – Day and Night
- 2011 – Breathless (US version includes Desire)
- 2013 – Sun
