= Él no soy yo =

2018 song by Blas Cantó

Single by Blas Cantó

from the album Complicado
- Released: 9 March 2018
- Recorded: 2017
- Length: 4:39
- Label: Warner Music Spain
- Songwriter(s): Antonio Rayo; Leroy Sanchez; Manuel Herrero Chalud; Rafael Vergara
- Producer(s): Rayito; Manuel Chalud

Blas Cantó singles chronology
"Drunk and Irresponsible" (2017)	"Él no soy yo" (2018)	"No volveré (A seguir tus pasos)" (2018)

"Él no soy yo" (Spanish for 'I am not him') is a song by Spanish singer Blas Cantó. It was released as a digital download and for streaming on 9 March 2018, as the third single from Cantó's debut studio album Complicado. The song was written by Antonio Rayo, Leroy Sanchez, Manuel Herrero Chalud and Rafael Vergara. The song peaked at number 35 on the Spanish Singles Chart and stayed on the list for forty weeks, achieving a platinum certification.

== Music video ==
A music video to accompany the release of "Él no soy yo" was first released onto YouTube on 9 March 2018.

== Track listing ==
Digital download
No.	Title	Length
1.	"Él No Soy Yo"	4:39

== Accolades ==
Year	Award	Category	Result	Ref.
2018	LOS40 Music Awards	Video of the Year	Nominated	

== Charts ==
Chart (2018)	Peak position
Spain (PROMUSICAE)	35

== Certifications ==
Region	Certification	Certified units/sales
Spain (PROMUSICAE)	2× Platinum	80,000^{‡}
^{‡} Sales+streaming figures based on certification alone.

== Release history ==
Region	Date	Format	Label
Spain	9 March 2018	Digital download; streaming	Warner Music Spain
