= Voy a quedarme =

2021 song by Blas Cantó

Single by Blas Cantó
- Language: Spanish
- Released: 10 February 2021
- Length: 3:02
- Label: Warner Music Spain
- Songwriters: Blas Cantó; Dan Hammond; Leroy Sanchez; Dangelo Ortega
- Producers: Blas Cantó; Ricky Furiati

Blas Cantó singles chronology
"Memoria" (2021)	"Voy a quedarme" (2021)	"El bueno acaba mal" (2022)

Music video
- "Voy a quedarme" on YouTube

Eurovision Song Contest 2021 entry
- Country: Spain
- Artist: Blas Cantó
- Language: Spanish
- Composers: Blas Cantó; Dan Hammond; Leroy Sanchez; Dangelo Ortega
- Lyricists: Blas Cantó; Dan Hammond; Leroy Sanchez; Dangelo Ortega

Finals performance
- Final result: 24th
- Final points: 6

Entry chronology
- ◄ "Universo" (2020)
- "SloMo" (2022) ►

Official performance video
- "Voy a quedarme" (semi-final) on YouTube "Voy a quedarme" (final) on YouTube

"Voy a quedarme" (Spanish pronunciation: [ˈboj a keˈðaɾme]; "I am going to stay") is a song by Spanish singer Blas Cantó, written by Dan Hammond, Leroy Sanchez, Dangelo Ortega, and Cantó himself. It was released as a digital download and for streaming on 10 February 2021. It represented Spain in the Eurovision Song Contest 2021, placing twenty-fourth.

== Background ==
=== Backstory ===
On 5 October 2019, Radiotelevisión Española (RTVE) announced that it had internally selected singer Blas Cantó as its performer for what was going to be the 65th edition of the Eurovision Song Contest. On 22 January 2020, RTVE revealed that he would sing the song "Universo". On 18 March 2020, after the contest was cancelled due to the COVID-19 pandemic, RTVE confirmed that Cantó would remain as their representative for the following edition of Eurovision, but with a new song.

=== Conception ===
"Voy a quedarme" was written by Dan Hammond, Leroy Sanchez, Dangelo Ortega, and Blas Cantó. Its composition was prompted by losses in Cantó's life, including the death of his grandmother in 2020 followed by his father's death. He said in an interview that the song was a sort of reconciling with these losses. The death of his father came as RTVE was announcing its decision to re-confirm him to represent Spain in the contest. He also said that the song was like a miracle and healing process. "I needed to perform on that stage. I needed to share my music, my soul", he said. The song was released as a digital download and for streaming on 10 February 2021.

=== Eurovision ===
On 20 February 2021, "Voy a quedarme" and "Memoria" competed in a two-song national final organized by RTVE, and aired on La 1 of Televisión Española, to select the song Cantó would perform in Eurovision. "Voy a quedarme" won the competition so it became the Spanish entry for the contest.

On 8 March 2021, RTVE premiered the promo video of "Voy a quedarme", where Cantó dances with his "grandmother". On 23 April 2021, he also released the English language version of the song titled "I'll Stay". On 17 May 2021, he released a duo version of "I'll Stay" featuring James Newman, the representative of the United Kingdom.

On 20 May 2021, the second semi-final of the Eurovision Song Contest was held at the Rotterdam Ahoy in Rotterdam hosted by the Nederlandse Publieke Omroep (NPO), Nederlandse Omroep Stichting (NOS), and AVROTROS, and broadcast live throughout the continent. A short interview with Blas Cantó and a short clip from the dress rehearsal of "Voy a quedarme" was featured in the show, as Spain, as a member of the "Big Five", automatically advanced to the final.

On 22 May 2021, the grand final of the Eurovision Song Contest was held. Cantó performed "Voy a quedarme" thirteenth on the night, following Iceland's "10 Years" by Daði og Gagnamagnið and preceding Moldova's "Sugar" by Natalia Gordienko. Cantó was dressed in a black outfit by Jaime Álvarez, and the staging, featuring a big moon, was designed by Marvin Dietmann.

At the close of voting, it had received 6 points, placing twenty-fourth in a field of twenty-six. The song was succeeded as Spanish entry at the 2022 contest by "SloMo" by Chanel.

== Charts ==
Chart performance for "Voy a quedarme"
Chart (2021)	Peak position
Lithuania (AGATA)	87
Netherlands (Single Tip)	23
