= In Your Bed =

Single by Blas Cantó

from the album Complicado
- Released: 3 March 2017
- Recorded: 2016
- Genre: Pop
- Length: 3:08
- Label: Warner Music Spain
- Songwriter(s): Anders Bagge; Arne Hovda; Blair MacKichan; Hugo Solis
- Producer(s): Anders Bagge

Blas Cantó singles chronology
"In Your Bed" (2017)	"Drunk and Irresponsible" (2017)

"In Your Bed" is a song by Spanish singer Blas Cantó. It was released as a digital download and for streaming on 3 March 2017, as the lead single from Cantó's debut studio album Complicado. The song was written by Anders Bagge, Arne Hovda, Blair MacKichan and Hugo Solis. The song peaked at number 57 on the Spanish Singles Chart.

== Music video ==
A music video to accompany the release of "In Your Bed" was first released onto YouTube on 3 March 2017.

== Track listing ==
Digital download
No.	Title	Length
1.	"In Your Bed"	3:08

Digital download
No.	Title	Length
1.	"In Your Bed" (Acoustic)	3:22

Digital download
No.	Title	Length
1.	"In Your Bed" (RMX)	2:55

== Accolades ==
Year	Award	Category	Result	Ref.
2017	LOS40 Music Awards	Video of the Year	Nominated	

== Charts ==
Chart (2017)	Peak position
Spain (PROMUSICAE)	57

== Release history ==
Region	Date	Format	Label
Spain	3 March 2017	Digital download; streaming	Warner Music Spain
