= Leroy Sanchez =

Spanish-American singer-songwriter (born 1991)

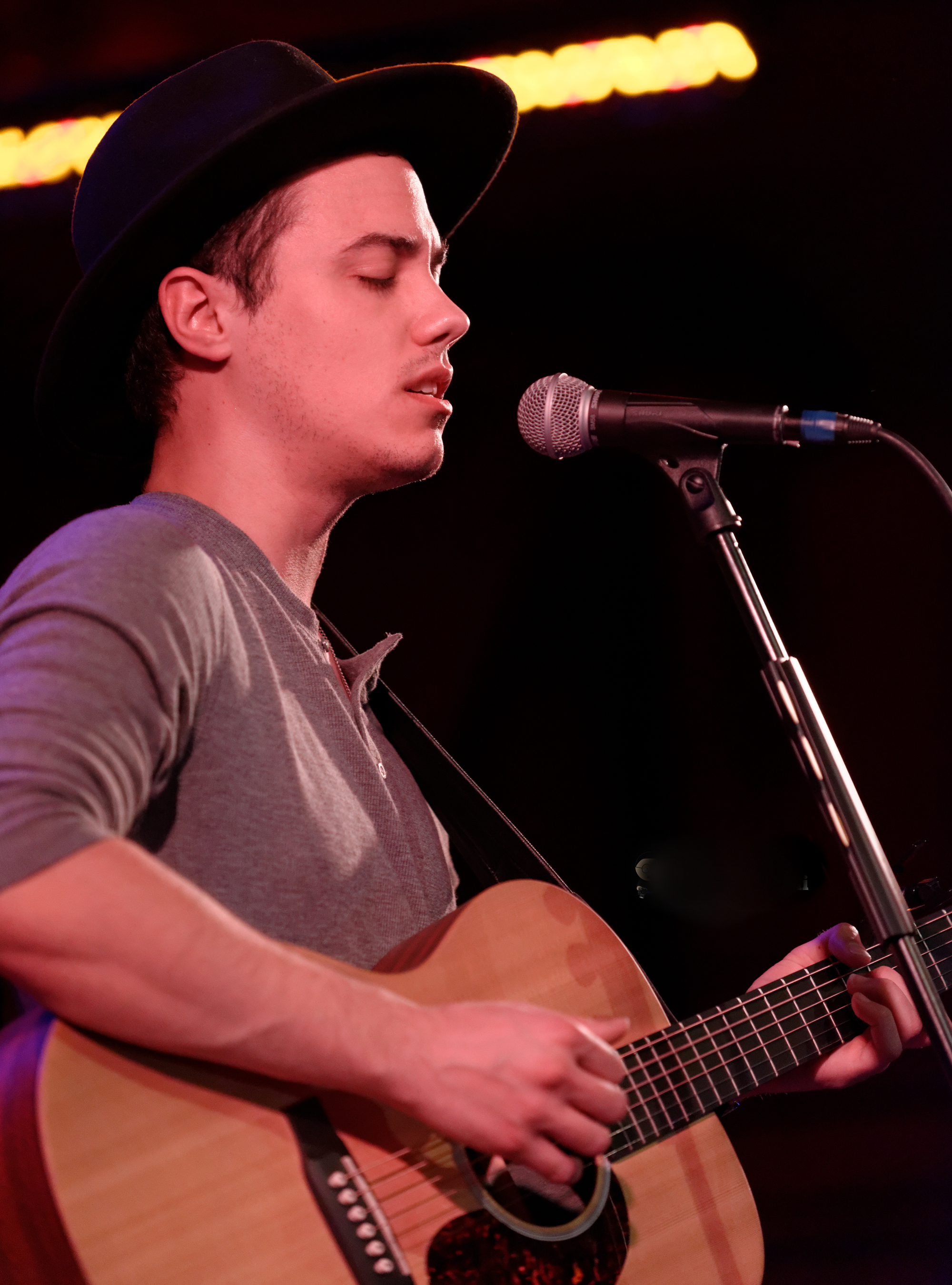
Leroy Sanchez performing live

Leroy Sanchez (born September 1, 1991, in Abetxuko, Spain) is a Spanish-American singer-songwriter.

== Early life ==
Leroy Sanchez was born in Abetxuko, Vitoria, Spain, and moved to the USA where he taught himself to play guitar, which is why he has no accent. At the age of 15, Sanchez uploaded his first cover song on YouTube, and his videos have since received more than 600 million views and he has over 4.37 million subscribers. In 2010, Sanchez met producer Jim Jonsin, who brought him to Miami. Sanchez is currently based in Los Angeles, California.

== Career ==
Leroy released two singles in 2014, "By My Side" and "Little Dancer".

In 2016, he was nominated for a Premios Juventud Award, and a Teen Choice Award.

Sanchez is an independent artist. He headlined the Man of the Year Tour, his first international run, from January to March 2017 and his Elevated Tour, from September to November 2017. Sanchez released his debut EP, Elevated, on August 4, 2017. He also released the Christmas song "It Ain't Christmas Without You".

Leroy's most viewed video on his YouTube channel is his cover of Adele's "Hello" with over 54 million views.

In 2018, he released a single called "Preacher." Following Preacher in 2020, he released his first Spanish single, "Miedo", along with an official acoustic version. On November 11, 2020, he released a Christmas EP called The Greatest Gift.

He composed the song "Voy a quedarme" alongside Blas Cantó, Dangelo and Dan Hammond for the Eurovision Song Contest 2021, which was sung by Blas Cantó representing Spain. Following this, he released an English version of the song called "I'll Stay".

On 24 September 2021, Leroy released a song called "Out My Way" and a few weeks later he released "Proud", one of his most personal songs. On 19 November 2021, Leroy released an EP called Standby with five songs: "Out My Way", "Proud", "River Lie", "Save This Love" and "Stay for A While".

In 2021, Sanchez was one of the songwriters for the song "SloMo", sung by Chanel, which represented Spain for the Eurovision Song Contest 2022.

On April 4, 2025, Leroy released his debut studio album, Sorry For The Chaos.

== Discography ==
=== Studio albums ===
- 2025: Sorry For The Chaos

=== EPs ===
- 2017: Elevated
- 2020: The Greatest Gift
- 2021: STANDBY
- 2022: STANDBY (Español)
- 2024: Strings Version - Live from Elbphilharmonie Hamburg

=== Singles ===
- 2014: Little Dancer
- 2015: By My Side
- 2017: Beauty and the Beast (with Lorea Turner)
- 2017: Perfect
- 2017: Man of the Year
- 2017: Love In The Dark
- 2018: Preacher
- 2019: Until I Reach You
- 2019: Bridges
- 2020: Miedo
- 2020: The Place Where I Belong
- 2021: Afterglow
- 2021: Driver License
- 2021: Leave The Door Open
- 2021: I'll Stay
- 2021: Voy a quedarme
- 2021: Out My Way
- 2021: Proud
- 2021: Save This Love
- 2022: Til Death Do Us Part
- 2022: Unchained Melody
- 2022: Bla, Bla, Bla

== Songwriting credits ==
Title	Year	Artist(s)	Album
"SloMo"	2021	Chanel	Non-album single

== Awards and nominations ==
=== Results ===
Year	Award	Nomination	Work	Result	Ref.
2016	Premios Juventud Awards	De Cover A Cover	Himself	Nominated	
2016	Teen Choice Awards	Choice Music: Next Big Thing	Himself	Nominated	

== Tours ==
=== Headlining ===
- 2017: Man Of The Year Tour
- 2017: Elevated Tour
- 2022: STANDBY - Live In Concert

=== Supporting Act ===
- 2016: Be Somebody World Tour (for Boyce Avenue)
