= Patricia Kraus =

- Born: 4 January 1964 (age 61); Milan, Italy
- Origin: Milan, Italy
- Genres: Pop, Jazz, Blues
- Occupation: Singer
- Instrument: Vocal
- Website: Patricia Kraus

Patricia Kraus (Spanish pronunciation: [paˈtɾiθja kɾaws]; born 4 January 1964) is a Spanish singer, best known for her participation in the 1987 Eurovision Song Contest.

== Early life ==
Kraus was born in Milan, Italy. Kraus' father was Alfredo Kraus, a Spanish tenor. As a youngster, Kraus trained as a classical vocalist, but later opted for pop-rock music in preference.

== Career ==
In 1987, Kraus was chosen internally by TVE as the Spanish representative for that year's Eurovision Song Contest with the song "No estás solo" ("You're Not Alone"). It was not seen by commentators as a Eurovision-friendly song, and at the 1987 Eurovision, held on 9 May in Brussels, could only place 19th out of the 22 entries. The performance is nowadays remembered more for the strange heavy make-up Kraus wore than for the song itself.

Kraus released her first self-titled album shortly after her Eurovision appearance. Further albums followed, including two of experimental electronica in collaboration with Daniel Assante, which were critically well-received although modest sellers. In 1999 she formed the group Waxbeat with Juan Belda and Juan Gómez Acebo, and two albums were released. In 2006, she took part as a singing trainer in the television series Operación Triunfo, and released a solo album, Alma, in 2007. Kraus, along with Assante and Italian musicians Enrico Barbaro and Gherardo Catanzaro, is currently working under the name of Vintage Club Band.

== Albums discography ==
- 1987: Patricia Kraus
- 1989: De animales y de selva
- 1991: El eco de tu voz
- 1996: Batería y voz en dos movimientos (with Daniel Assante)
- 1998: Atlanterra (with Daniel Assante)
- 1998: I Amm
- 2000: Lava's Lamp (with Waxbeat)
- 2003: Go Outside and Play (with Waxbeat)
- 2007: Alma
- 2009: Vintage Fun Club
- 2011: Retrocollection
- 2013: Divazz

Awards and achievements
Preceded by Cadillac with "Valentino"	Spain in the Eurovision Song Contest; 1987	Succeeded by La Década Prodigiosa with "La chica que yo quiero (Made in Spain)"
