= Blas Cantó =

Spanish singer (born 1991)

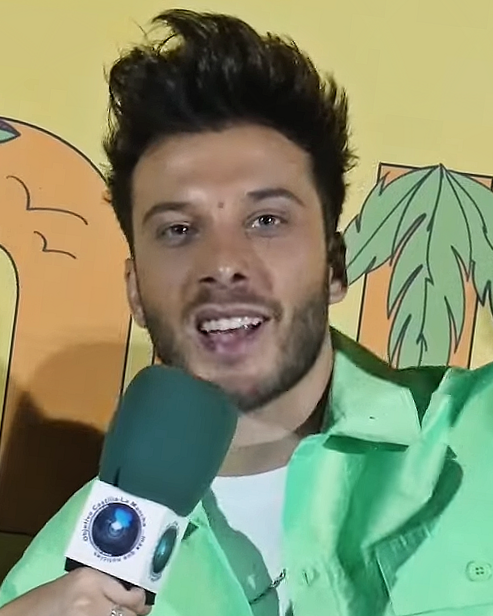
- Cantó in 2022

Background information
- Born: Blas Cantó Moreno; 26 October 1991 (age 34); Ricote, Murcia, Spain
- Genres: Pop
- Occupation: Singer
- Instrument: Vocals
- Years active: 2000—present
- Label: Warner Music Spain
- Formerly of: Auryn

Blas Cantó Moreno (born 26 October 1991) is a Spanish singer and songwriter. He rose to prominence as a member of the Spanish band Auryn. In 2017, he embarked on a solo career. His debut studio album Complicado was released in September 2018, the album peaked at number one on the Spanish Albums Chart. He was going to represent Spain at the Eurovision Song Contest 2020 in Rotterdam, with the song "Universo" but the competition was cancelled because of the COVID-19 pandemic. He represented Spain instead in Eurovision Song Contest 2021 with the song "Voy a quedarme".

== Career ==
=== 2000–2004: Beginnings ===
In 2000, Cantó participated in the children's talent show Veo Veo, at eight-years old. In 2004, he participated in Eurojunior, the national selection process organised by Televisión Española (TVE) to select the Spanish entry for the Junior Eurovision Song Contest 2004. He advanced to the national final with the song "Sentir", but lost to María Isabel, who went on to win the European final with the song "Antes muerta que sencilla".

=== 2009–2016: Auryn ===
In 2009, Cantó founded the boy band Auryn together with Álvaro Gango, Carlos Marco, David Lafuente and Dani Fernández. In 2011, the band participated in Destino Eurovisión, the national selection process organised by TVE to select the Spanish entry for the Eurovision Song Contest 2011. The band advanced to the national final's top three, but lost in the televote to Lucía Pérez.

Auryn went on to gain popularity after their appearance on Destino Eurovisión. The band released their first single "Breathe in the Light" later in 2011, as well as their debut album Endless Road, 7058, both reaching the top 10 of the Spanish Singles and Albums Charts respectively. Their follow-up album Anti-Heroes was released in 2013 and went straight to number one on the Spanish Albums Chart and was certified platinum. Their third album Circus Avenue was preceded by the group's first number one single "Puppeteer", and reached number one on the Spanish Albums Chart where it stayed for 5 consecutive weeks, as well as a platinum certification. The band released their fourth album Ghost Town in December 2015, seven months before announcing the breakup of the band.

=== 2016–2017: Tu Cara Me Suena ===
In July 2016, Cantó was announced to join the cast of the fifth season of television show Tu cara me suena of the singing show series Your Face Sounds Familiar, in which celebrity contestants impersonate a different iconic music artist on stage each week. Shortly after, Auryn announced that they were going into hiatus, as various members of the band, including Cantó, were expecting to launch solo projects. The fifth season of Tu cara me suena premiered on Antena 3 on 7 October 2016. In the season finale that took place on 3 March 2017, he was declared the winner with 55% of the televote.

Performances

Points
Maximum points

Perf. #	Song	Original performer	Jury					Public	Final points
Perf. #	Song	Original performer	Carlos Latre	Lolita Flores	Chenoa	Àngel Llàcer	Total	Public	Final points
1	"Como yo te amo"	Raphael	8	7	10	10	35 (9)	10	19
2	"Greased Lightning"	John Travolta (Grease)	10	10	10	10	40 (10)	10	20
3	"Can't Stop the Feeling!"	Justin Timberlake	12	12	11	11	46 (12)	12	24
4	"Sola" (Training VIP)	Diana Navarro	12	12	12	12	48 (12)	12	24
5	"Stay With Me".	Sam Smith	9	10	10	6	35 (10)	10	20
6	"Livin' la Vida Loca"	Ricky Martin	9	10	10	9	38 (10)	12	22
7	"Qué voy a hacer con mi amor"	Alejandro Fernández	11	9	11	10	41 (10)	11	21
8	"Believe"	Cher	12	11	10	12	45 (12)	12	24
9	"Feeling Good"	Michael Bublé	10	11	9	11	41 (11)	11	22
10	"S.O.S" (Training VIP)	Falete	12	12	12	12	48 (12)	12	24
11	"La Bohème"	Charles Aznavour	9	11	11	12	43 (11)	11	22
12	"Purple Rain" (Bring a Friend) with Roko	Prince & Beyoncé	11	8	11	6	36 (9)	11	20
13	"Ave María"	Andrea Bocelli	7	6	7	5	25 (5)	12	17
14	"Somebody to Love"	Freddie Mercury (Queen)	11	11	12	12	46 (11)	12	23
15	"Libre"	Nino Bravo	10	10	10	9	39 (10)	9	19
1st semi-final	"Left Outside Alone	Anastacia	12	12	12	12	48 (12)	12	24
2nd semi-final	"Quisiera yo saber" (Exhibition performance)	Melendi	Qualified to the final from 1st semi-final.						
Final	"¿Y cómo es él?"	Marc Anthony (cover of a song by José Luis Perales)	Winner of the 5th series						

=== 2017–present: Solo career ===
After signing to Warner Music Spain, Cantó released his debut solo single "In Your Bed" on 3 March 2017, the same day as the finale of Tu Cara Me Suena.

On 9 March 2018, Cantó released his first solo Spanish-language single, "Él no soy yo". The single went on to achieve a PROMUSICAE platinum certification. Cantó released his debut solo album, titled Complicado, on 14 September 2018, and debuted atop the Spanish Albums Chart.

On 5 October 2019, TVE announced Cantó as the Spanish entrant at the Eurovision Song Contest 2020. He was going to compete with the song "Universo". After the contest was cancelled, TVE announced that Cantó would represent Spain at the Eurovision Song Contest 2021.

On 29 June 2021, following his participation at Eurovision, Cantó released the single "Americana" featuring the Californian band Echosmith. The official video of the single was released the same day on his official YouTube channel. One month later, a lyric video of the song was released, this version as a solo single with lyrics fully in Spanish.

== Eurovision Song Contest ==
=== 2020 ===
On 5 October 2019, TVE announced Cantó as the Spanish entrant at the Eurovision Song Contest 2020. He was going to compete with the song "Universo". After the contest was cancelled due to the coronavirus global pandemic, TVE announced that Cantó would represent Spain at the Eurovision Song Contest 2021.

=== 2021 ===
For the 2021 finals, titled "Destino Eurovisión 2021", he has proposed various songs and two were chosen for the final to be picked from: "Memoria" and "Voy a quedarme". The final was held on 20 February 2021, with "Voy a quedarme" winning and being chosen to represent Spain in the Eurovision Song Contest 2021. In the final on 22 May 2021, he placed 24th out of 26, scoring 6 points.

== Discography ==
=== Albums ===
Title	Details	Peak position
Title	Details	SPA
Complicado	Released: 14 September 2018; Formats: Digital download, CD; Label: Warner Music Spain	1
El Príncipe	Released: 3 June 2023; Formats: Digital download, CD; Label: Warner Music Spain	10

== Extended plays ==
Title	Details	Peak position
Title	Details	SPA
Noel	Released: 19 December 2025; Formats: Digital download; Label: Diezycuatro 1024	

=== Singles ===
==== As lead artist ====
Title	Year	Peak chart positions			Certifications	Album
Title	Year	SPA	LTU	NLD	Certifications	Album
"In Your Bed"	2017	57	—	—		Complicado
"Drunk and Irresponsible"	2017	—	—	—		Complicado
"Él no soy yo"	2018	35	—	—	PROMUSICAE: x2 Platinum	Complicado
"No volveré (A seguir tus pasos)"	2018	—	—	—		Complicado
"Si te vas"	2019	—	—	—		Complicados (Complicado reissue)
"Universo"	2020	—	—	—		non-album singles
"Memoria"	2021	—	—	—		non-album singles
"Voy a quedarme"	2021	—	87	— (Note: "Voy a quedarme" did not enter the Dutch Single Top 100, but peaked at number 23 on the Single Tip chart.)		non-album singles
"Americana" (feat. Echosmith)	2021	—	—	—		non-album singles
"El Bueno Acaba Mal"	2022	—	—	—		non-album singles
"Las cosas claras" (with Carmen DeLeon)	2023	—	—	—		non-album singles
"El Proceso" (with MANTRA)	2023	—	—	—		non-album singles
"—" denotes a recording that did not chart or was not released in that territory.

==== As featured artist ====
Title	Year	Album
"Mi luz" (Pastora Soler featuring Blas Cantó)	2020	Sentir
"I Dare You (Te Reto a Amar)" (Kelly Clarkson featuring Blas Cantó)	2020	non-album singles
"Cúrame" (Nia featuring Blas Cantó)	2021	non-album singles
"La stessa lingua" (Emma Muscat featuring Blas Cantó)	2022	non-album singles

=== Promotional singles ===
Title	Year	Album
"Complicado"	2018	Complicado
"Dejarte ir" (featuring Leire Martínez)	2019	Complicado

== Awards and nominations ==
Year	Organization	Category	Nominee/work	Result	Ref.
2017	LOS40 Music Awards	New Artist of the Year	Blas Cantó	Nominated	
2017	LOS40 Music Awards	Video of the Year	"In Your Bed"	Nominated	
2018	LOS40 Music Awards	Video of the Year	"Él no soy yo"	Nominated	
2019	LOS40 Music Awards	Album of the Year	Complicado	Nominated	

Preceded by Miki Núñez with "La venda"	Spain in the Eurovision Song Contest; 2020 (cancelled)	Succeeded by Himself with "Voy a quedarme"
Preceded by Himself with "Universo"	Spain in the Eurovision Song Contest; 2021	Succeeded by Chanel with "SloMo"
