= Spain in the Eurovision Song Contest =

- Eurovision Song Contest
- Participating broadcaster: Radiotelevisión Española (RTVE; 2007–2025) Formerly: Televisión Española (TVE; 1961–2006)

Participation summary
- Appearances: 64
- First appearance: 1961
- Last appearance: 2025
- Highest placement: 1st: 1968, 1969
- Host: 1969
- Participation history: 1961; 1962; 1963; 1964; 1965; 1966; 1967; 1968; 1969; 1970; 1971; 1972; 1973; 1974; 1975; 1976; 1977; 1978; 1979; 1980; 1981; 1982; 1983; 1984; 1985; 1986; 1987; 1988; 1989; 1990; 1991; 1992; 1993; 1994; 1995; 1996; 1997; 1998; 1999; 2000; 2001; 2002; 2003; 2004; 2005; 2006; 2007; 2008; 2009; 2010; 2011; 2012; 2013; 2014; 2015; 2016; 2017; 2018; 2019; ~~2020~~; 2021; 2022; 2023; 2024; 2025; 2026

Related articles
- Benidorm Fest; Operación Triunfo

External links
- RTVE page
- Spain's page at Eurovision.com

Spain has been represented at the Eurovision Song Contest 64 times, debuting in the 1961 contest and participating every year thereafter until 2025. The Spanish participating broadcaster in the contest is Radiotelevisión Española (RTVE). Spain is one of the "Big Five" countries, along with France, Germany, Italy, and the United Kingdom, that are automatically prequalified for the final, due to their participating broadcasters being the largest financial contributors to the European Broadcasting Union (EBU). The country opted not to participate for the first time in 2026 due to the inclusion of Israel in the context of the Gaza war, thereby reducing the number of "Big" countries to four.

Spain has won the contest twice, first in 1968 with the song "La La La" performed by Massiel and again in 1969, when "Vivo cantando" by Salomé was involved in a four-way tie with France, the Netherlands and the United Kingdom. The 1969 contest in Madrid is the only time Spain has hosted the event, since lots were drawn after 1969's four-way tie and the 1970 contest was hosted by the Netherlands. Other good results in the 20th century were four second places with "En un mundo nuevo" by Karina in 1971, "Eres tú" by Mocedades in 1973, "Su canción" by Betty Missiego in 1979, and "Vuelve conmigo" by Anabel Conde in 1995, and a third place with "Lady, Lady" by Bravo in 1984. The country finished last with nul points three times: in 1962, 1965, and 1983, and also finished last in 1999 and 2017.

Since the start of the 21st century, Spain has reached the top ten seven times, with "Dile que la quiero" by David Civera (2001) finishing sixth, "Europe's Living a Celebration" by Rosa (2002) finishing seventh, "Dime" by Beth (2003) finishing eighth, "Para llenarme de ti" by Ramón (2004) finishing tenth, both "Quédate conmigo" by Pastora Soler (2012) and "Dancing in the Rain" by Ruth Lorenzo (2014) also finishing tenth, and "SloMo" by Chanel (2022) finishing third. Spain has also failed to reach the top twenty in ten of the last eighteen contests, including for six consecutive contests (2015–21). With "Eaea" by Blanca Paloma placing 17th in 2023, Spain became the first country to finish in all possible positions in the final (1st–26th). Spain is the country with the longest active victory drought, spanning over a total of 57 years (1969–2026).

== Participation ==
Televisión Española (TVE) was a full member of the European Broadcasting Union (EBU), thus eligible to participate in the Eurovision Song Contest. It participated in the contest representing Spain since its sixth edition in 1961. Since 2007, after a restructuring that led to the incorporation of TVE into the current Radiotelevisión Española (RTVE) corporation, it is the latter who participates representing Spain.

Since 1999, Spain, along with France, Germany, and the United Kingdom, have automatically qualified for the Eurovision final regardless of their results in previous contests. The participating broadcasters from these countries earned this special status by being the four biggest financial contributors to the EBU, and subsequently became known as the "Big Four". Italy returned to the contest in 2011, resulting in the countries becoming members of a "Big Five".

== Selection process ==
Spain has regularly changed the selection process used in order to find the country's entry for the contest, either a national final or internal selection (sometimes a combination of both formats) has been held by the broadcaster at the time. Between 1977 and 1999, Spain's entries were selected internally by TVE. Before that, internal selections and national contests, like Pasaporte a Dublín (Passport to Dublin) in 1971, were alternated.

From 2000, Spain has used various selection formats with different results. In 2000 and 2001, TVE organised a national final called Eurocanción (Eurosong), where the Spanish representative was selected for the contest. From 2002 to 2004, the reality television talent competition Operación Triunfo (the Spanish version of Star Academy) was used to select the entry, a format that renewed the Spanish audience's interest in the contest and brought three top 10 results in a row, until TVE decided not to host any further editions of the series. In 2005, the national final Eurovisión 2005: Elige nuestra canción (Eurovision 2005: Choose Our Song) was organised, where the audience chose their favourite song among a pre-selection made by TVE of unknown artists submitted to them by record labels. The result in the Eurovision final was not good and for 2006, the selection was made internally for the first time since 1999, with a similar result. In 2007, Spain's entry was decided through the Misión Eurovisión 2007 show, with a disappointing result once again.

From 2008 to 2010, the Internet was the key element of the competitions used by RTVE to select the Spanish entry. In 2008, the social networking website MySpace was involved in the national final Salvemos Eurovisión (Let's Save Eurovision). A website was created to make it possible for anyone to upload a song and proceed to a televised final if chosen by online voters or an expert jury. The result improved a little, but not much; nevertheless the interest of the Spanish audience was revived again. For 2009, MySpace was still involved in the selection process Eurovisión 2009: El retorno (Eurovision 2009: The Return), although some changes were introduced in the format. The result was the worst in the 2000s (decade): 24th place. In 2010, a similar format, Eurovisión: Destino Oslo, selected the Spanish entry, with the best result since 2004 (15th).

In 2011, Internet voting was scrapped from the new selection method Destino Eurovisión. After a further disappointing result (23rd), for 2012, RTVE decided to approach an established act, Pastora Soler, and organise a national final to select her song. A top ten result was achieved for the first time since 2004. The same procedure was repeated in 2013, with El Sueño de Morfeo as the established act, which turned out one of the most disappointing results (25th out of 26 entries) in the country's Eurovision history; some critics, however, blamed a less-than-stellar performance of an otherwise solid song. In 2014, RTVE decided to return to a multi-artist national final procedure, called Mira quién va a Eurovisión (Look who's going to Eurovision); five artists were invited to participate by RTVE. A top ten result was achieved for the second time in three years.

In 2015, for the first time since 2006, both the artist, Edurne, and the song were selected internally by RTVE. On 18 December 2015, RTVE announced that it would organise a national final in order to select the Spanish entry for the Eurovision Song Contest 2016. Six acts competed in the national final named Objetivo Eurovisión, and Barei won the selection process. The same format was used in 2017, and Manel Navarro won the selection process; it turned out Spain's first last-place result since 1999.

In 2017, RTVE commissioned a new season of Operación Triunfo, which returned to TVE after thirteen years, and the series served for the fourth time (after 2002, 2003 and 2004) as the platform to select the Spanish entry for the 2018 contest. The result was disappointing (23rd out of 26 entries), but the 2018 Eurovision final was the most-watched in Spain since 2008. A further season of the talent show chose the Spanish entry for the 2019 contest with another disappointing result (22nd out of 26 entries).

For the 2020 contest, RTVE selected the Spanish entry internally, with Blas Cantó and the song "Universo" chosen. Following the cancellation of the contest due to the COVID-19 pandemic, RTVE was one of the first four broadcasters (the other were Greece's ERT, Netherlands' AVROTROS and Ukraine's UA:PBC) that confirmed its participation for the 2021 edition with the same artist who would have participated for 2020, in this case Cantó. His 2021 entry "Voy a quedarme" went on to finish in 24th place with six points, marking the sixth time in a row that Spain has finished outside of the top twenty.

For the 2022 contest, it was announced that RTVE would use Benidorm Fest, a revamped version of the Benidorm Song Festival to select the nation's entry among thirteen candidates. The broadcaster signed a contract with the regional government of the Valencian Community to hold the event for four editions. The first Benidorm Fest was won by Chanel with "SloMo", which finished in third place at Eurovision with 459 points, thereby achieving Spain's best Eurovision result since 1995.

== Interrupted performances ==
Only three times in the contest's history has a non-winning entry been allowed to perform again, and in two of these instances, the entries in question were Spanish representatives (the other one being the Italian entry in 1958, "Nel blu, dipinto di blu" by Domenico Modugno). The first time this happened to a Spanish representative was in the 1990 contest in Zagreb, when Azúcar Moreno opened the contest with the song "Bandido". The orchestra and the recorded backing track began the song out of sync, which caused the singers to miss their cue. The singers left the stage after a few seconds, and no explanation was given at the time. After a few uneasy moments, the music began correctly and the song was performed in full. Azúcar Moreno and "Bandido" went on to place fifth in the final vote tally, though the juries at the time actually awarded their points after watching the dress rehearsal performances, so the restart did not affect Spain's overall result either positively or negatively.

Twenty years later, at the 2010 contest in Oslo, Spain was drawn to perform second in the running order, and Daniel Diges's performance of "Algo pequeñito" was disturbed by Catalan pitch invader Jimmy Jump. However, Diges performed the song in full, despite the invader's intrusion and subsequent removal from the stage by security personnel, receiving warm applause for continuing from the audience at the Telenor Arena. After Serbia's performance, co-presenter Nadia Hasnaoui announced that, according to the rules, Diges would be given a second chance once all the remaining countries had performed. Nonetheless, the juries ranked the dress-rehearsal performance of "Algo pequeñito" 20th out of 25 with 43 points, whereas the televoting results ranked Spain 12th, with 106 points. The combination of jury and televote results gave Spain a 15th-place finish.

== Participation overview ==
Table key
1	First place
2	Second place
3	Third place
◁	Last place
◇	Entry selected but did not compete

Year	Artist	Song	Language	Final	Points	Semi	Points
1961	Conchita Bautista	"Estando contigo"	Spanish	9	8	No semi-finals	
1962	Víctor Balaguer	"Llámame"	Spanish	13 ◁	0	No semi-finals	
1963	José Guardiola	"Algo prodigioso"	Spanish	12	2	No semi-finals	
1964	Nelly with Tim and Tony	"Caracola"	Spanish	12	1	No semi-finals	
1965	Conchita Bautista	"Qué bueno, qué bueno"	Spanish	15 ◁	0	No semi-finals	
1966	Raphael	"Yo soy aquél"	Spanish	7	9	No semi-finals	
1967	Raphael	"Hablemos del amor"	Spanish	6	9	No semi-finals	
1968	Massiel	"La La La"	Spanish	1	29	No semi-finals	
1969	Salomé	"Vivo cantando"	Spanish	1	18	No semi-finals	
1970	Julio Iglesias	"Gwendolyne"	Spanish	4	8	No semi-finals	
1971	Karina	"En un mundo nuevo"	Spanish	2	116	No semi-finals	
1972	Jaime Morey	"Amanece"	Spanish	10	83	No semi-finals	
1973	Mocedades	"Eres tú"	Spanish	2	125	No semi-finals	
1974	Peret	"Canta y sé feliz"	Spanish	9	10	No semi-finals	
1975	Sergio and Estíbaliz	"Tú volverás"	Spanish	10	53	No semi-finals	
1976	Braulio	"Sobran las palabras"	Spanish	16	11	No semi-finals	
1977	Micky	"Enséñame a cantar"	Spanish	9	52	No semi-finals	
1978	José Vélez	"Bailemos un vals"	Spanish	9	65	No semi-finals	
1979	Betty Missiego	"Su canción"	Spanish	2	116	No semi-finals	
1980	Trigo Limpio	"Quédate esta noche"	Spanish	12	38	No semi-finals	
1981	Bacchelli	"Y sólo tú"	Spanish	14	38	No semi-finals	
1982	Lucía	"Él"	Spanish	10	52	No semi-finals	
1983	Remedios Amaya	"Quién maneja mi barca"	Spanish	19 ◁	0	No semi-finals	
1984	Bravo	"Lady, Lady"	Spanish	3	106	No semi-finals	
1985	Paloma San Basilio	"La fiesta terminó"	Spanish	14	36	No semi-finals	
1986	Cadillac	"Valentino"	Spanish	10	51	No semi-finals	
1987	Patricia Kraus	"No estás solo"	Spanish	19	10	No semi-finals	
1988	La Década	"La chica que yo quiero (Made in Spain)"	Spanish	11	58	No semi-finals	
1989	Nina	"Nacida para amar"	Spanish	6	88	No semi-finals	
1990	Azúcar Moreno	"Bandido"	Spanish	5	96	No semi-finals	
1991	Sergio Dalma	"Bailar pegados"	Spanish	4	119	No semi-finals	
1992	Serafín	"Todo esto es la música"	Spanish	14	37	No semi-finals	
1993	Eva Santamaría	"Hombres"	Spanish	11	58	Kvalifikacija za Millstreet	
1994	Alejandro Abad	"Ella no es ella"	Spanish	18	17	No semi-finals	
1995	Anabel Conde	"Vuelve conmigo"	Spanish	2	119	No semi-finals	
1996	Antonio Carbonell	"Ay, qué deseo"	Spanish	20	17	14	43
1997	Marcos Llunas	"Sin rencor"	Spanish	6	96	No semi-finals	
1998	Mikel Herzog	"¿Qué voy a hacer sin ti?"	Spanish	16	21	No semi-finals	
1999	Lydia	"No quiero escuchar"	Spanish	23 ◁	1	No semi-finals	
2000	Serafín Zubiri	"Colgado de un sueño"	Spanish	18	18	No semi-finals	
2001	David Civera	"Dile que la quiero"	Spanish	6	76	No semi-finals	
2002	Rosa	"Europe's Living a Celebration"	Spanish, English	7	81	No semi-finals	
2003	Beth	"Dime"	Spanish	8	81	No semi-finals	
2004	Ramón	"Para llenarme de ti"	Spanish	10	87	Member of the "Big Four"	
2005	Son de Sol	"Brujería"	Spanish	21	28	Member of the "Big Four"	
2006	Las Ketchup	"Bloody Mary"	Spanish	21	18	Member of the "Big Four"	
2007	D'Nash	"I Love You Mi Vida"	Spanish, English	20	43	Member of the "Big Four"	
2008	Rodolfo Chikilicuatre	"Baila el Chiki Chiki"	English, Spanish	16	55	Member of the "Big Four"	
2009	Soraya Arnelas	"La noche es para mí"	Spanish, English	24	23	Member of the "Big Four"	
2010	Daniel Diges	"Algo pequeñito"	Spanish	15	68	Member of the "Big Four"	
2011	Lucía Pérez	"Que me quiten lo bailao"	Spanish	23	50	Member of the "Big Five"	
2012	Pastora Soler	"Quédate conmigo"	Spanish	10	97	Member of the "Big Five"	
2013	ESDM	"Contigo hasta el final"	Spanish	25	8	Member of the "Big Five"	
2014	Ruth Lorenzo	"Dancing in the Rain"	English, Spanish	10	74	Member of the "Big Five"	
2015	Edurne	"Amanecer"	Spanish	21	15	Member of the "Big Five"	
2016	Barei	"Say Yay!"	English	22	77	Member of the "Big Five"	
2017	Manel Navarro	"Do It for Your Lover"	English, Spanish	26 ◁	5	Member of the "Big Five"	
2018	Amaia and Alfred	"Tu canción"	Spanish	23	61	Member of the "Big Five"	
2019	Miki	"La venda"	Spanish	22	54	Member of the "Big Five"	
2020	Blas Cantó ◇	"Universo" ◇	Spanish ◇	Contest cancelled (Note: The 2020 contest was cancelled due to the COVID-19 pandemic.)		Member of the "Big Five"	
2021	Blas Cantó	"Voy a quedarme"	Spanish	24	6	Member of the "Big Five"	
2022	Chanel	"SloMo"	English, Spanish	3	459	Member of the "Big Five"	
2023	Blanca Paloma	"Eaea"	Spanish	17	100	Member of the "Big Five"	
2024	Nebulossa	"Zorra"	Spanish	22	30	Member of the "Big Five"	
2025	Melody	"Esa diva"	Spanish	24	37	Member of the "Big Five"	

=== Congratulations: 50 Years of the Eurovision Song Contest ===
Artist	Song	Language	At Congratulations				At Eurovision		
Artist	Song	Language	Final	Points	Semi	Points	Year	Place	Points
Mocedades	"Eres tú"	Spanish	Failed to qualify		11	90	1973	2	125

== Hostings ==
Year	Location	Venue	Presenter
1969	Madrid	Teatro Real	Laura Valenzuela

== Awards ==
=== Marcel Bezençon Awards ===
Year	Category	Song	Performer	Final	Points	Host city	Ref.
2003	Fan Award	"Dime"	Beth	8	81	(Latvia) Riga	

=== Barbara Dex Award ===
Year	Performer	Host city	Ref.
1999	Lydia	(Israel) Jerusalem	

== Related involvement ==
=== Conductors ===
Year	Conductor (Note: All conductors are of Spanish nationality unless otherwise noted.)	Notes	Ref.
1961	Rafael Ferrer		
1962	(Luxembourg) Jean Roderes	(Note: Host conductor.)	
1963	Rafael Ibarbia		
1964	Rafael Ibarbia		
1965	Adolfo Ventas		
1966	Rafael Ibarbia		
1967	Manuel Alejandro		
1968	Rafael Ibarbia		
1969	Augusto Algueró	(Note: Host conductor; also conducted the Luxembourgish entry)	
1970	Augusto Algueró		
1971	(Argentina) Waldo de los Rios	(Note: Only South American conductor in the history of the Eurovision Song Contest.)	
1972	Augusto Algueró		
1973	Juan Carlos Calderón		
1974	Rafael Ibarbia	(Note: Originally intended to be conducted by Juan Carlos Calderón; he fell ill prior to the contest and was replaced by Ibarbia.)	
1975	Juan Carlos Calderón		
1976	Joan Barcons		
1977	Rafael Ibarbia		
1978	Ramón Arcusa		
1979	José Luis Navarro		
1980	Javier Iturraide		
1981	Joan Barcons		
1982	Miguel Ángel Varona		
1983	José Miguel Évora		
1984	Eddy Guerin		
1985	Juan Carlos Calderón		
1986	Eduardo Leiva		
1987	Eduardo Leiva		
1988	Javier de Juan		
1989	Juan Carlos Calderón		
1990	Eduardo Leiva		
1991	Eduardo Leiva		
1992	Javier Losada		
1993	Eduardo Leiva		
1994	Josep Llobell		
1995	Eduardo Leiva		
1996	Eduardo Leiva		
1997	Toni Xuclà		
1998	Alberto Estébanez		

=== Heads of delegation ===
Each participating broadcaster in the Eurovision Song Contest assigns a head of delegation as the EBU's contact person and the leader of their delegation at the event. The delegation, whose size can greatly vary, includes a head of press, the performers, songwriters, composers, and backing vocalists, among others.

Year	Head of delegation	Ref.
1979	Pepita Martínez	
1991–2001	María Teresa Segura	
2002–2016	Federico Llano	
2017–2021	Ana María Bordas	
2022–2023	Eva Mora	
2024–2025	Ana María Bordas	
~~2026~~	~~César Vallejo~~	

=== Jury members ===
Each participating broadcaster assembles a jury panel consisting of music industry professionals for the semi-finals and final of the Eurovision Song Contest (in 2023–2025 juries only vote in the final), ranking all entries except for their own. Since 2009, the juries' points add 50% to the overall result alongside televoting.

Year	Jury members					Ref.
2014	Raúl Fuentes	La Dama	Jorge Gónzalez	Leticia Fuentes	Kiko Rodríguez	
2015	Jacobo Calderón	Daniel Diges	Rosa López	Ruth Lorenzo	Pastora Soler	
2016	Mónica Vázquez	Salvador Beltrán	Maverick López	Xuso Jones	Coral Segovia	
2017	David Civera	Paula Rojo	Rubén Villanueva	Antonio Hueso	Natalia	
2018	Rafa Cano	Brisa Fenoy	Miriam Rodríguez	Roi Méndez	Conchita	
2019	Sole Giménez	Elena Gómez	Ricky Merino	Raúl Gómez	David Feito	
2021	Samantha Gilabert	Antonio Hueso	María Peláe	Nerea Rodríguez	David Santisteban	
2022	Blanca Paloma	Carlos Marco	Kai Etxaniz	Pilar Tabares	Verónica Ferreiro	
2023	Aaron Sáez	Francisco Javier Viñolo	Estefanía García	Marta Sango	Vicky Gómez	
2024	Irene Garrido	St. Pedro	Juan Manuel Pinzás	Rosa María Comín	Gema del Valle	
2025	Javier Llano	Javier Pageo	Anabel Conde	Irene Garrido	Mel Ömana	

=== Commentators and spokespersons ===
Year	Television commentator	Radio commentator	Spokesperson	Ref.
1961	Federico Gallo	Unknown	Diego Ramírez Pastor	
1962	Federico Gallo	Unknown	Luis Marsillach	
1963	Federico Gallo	Unknown	Julio Rico	
1964	Federico Gallo	Unknown	Julio Rico	
1965	Federico Gallo	Unknown	Pepe Palau	
1966	Federico Gallo	Unknown	Blanca Álvarez Mantilla	
1967	José Luis Uribarri	Unknown	Margarita Nicola	
1968	Federico Gallo	José María Íñigo	Ramón Rivera	
1969	José Luis Uribarri	Unknown	Joaquín Prat	
1970	José Luis Uribarri	Unknown	Joaquín Prat	
1971	Joaquín Prat	Unknown	No spokesperson	
1972	Julio Rico	Unknown	No spokesperson	
1973	Julio Rico	Unknown	No spokesperson	
1974	José Luis Uribarri	Unknown	Antolín García	
1975	José Luis Uribarri	No radio commentary	José María Íñigo	
1976	José Luis Uribarri	No radio commentary	José María Íñigo	
1977	Miguel de los Santos	No radio commentary	Isabel Tenaille	
1978	Miguel de los Santos	No radio commentary	Matías Prats Luque	
1979	Miguel de los Santos	No radio commentary	Manuel Almendros	
1980	Miguel de los Santos	No radio commentary	Alfonso Lapeña	
1981	Miguel de los Santos	No radio commentary	Isabel Tenaille	
1982	Miguel de los Santos	No radio commentary	Marisa Medina	
1983	José-Miguel Ullán	No radio commentary	Rosa Campano	
1984	José-Miguel Ullán	No radio commentary	Matilde Jarrín	
1985	Antonio Gómez	No radio commentary	Matilde Jarrín	
1986	Antonio Gómez	No radio commentary	Matilde Jarrín	
1987	Beatriz Pécker	No radio commentary	Matilde Jarrín	
1988	Beatriz Pécker	No radio commentary	Matilde Jarrín	
1989	Tomás Fernando Flores	No radio commentary	Matilde Jarrín	
1990	Luis Cobos	No radio commentary	Matilde Jarrín	
1991	Tomás Fernando Flores	No radio commentary	María Ángeles Balañac	
1992	José Luis Uribarri	No radio commentary	María Ángeles Balañac	
1993	José Luis Uribarri	No radio commentary	María Ángeles Balañac	
1994	José Luis Uribarri	No radio commentary	María Ángeles Balañac	
1995	José Luis Uribarri	No radio commentary	Belén Fernández de Henestrosa	
1996	José Luis Uribarri	No radio commentary	Belén Fernández de Henestrosa	
1997	José Luis Uribarri	No radio commentary	Belén Fernández de Henestrosa	
1998	José Luis Uribarri	No radio commentary	Belén Fernández de Henestrosa	
1999	José Luis Uribarri	No radio commentary	Hugo de Campos	
2000	José Luis Uribarri	No radio commentary	Hugo de Campos	
2001	José Luis Uribarri	No radio commentary	Jennifer Rope	
2002	José Luis Uribarri	Nieves Herrero and José María de Juana	Anne Igartiburu	
2003	José Luis Uribarri	No radio commentary	Anne Igartiburu	
2004	Beatriz Pécker	No radio commentary	Anne Igartiburu	
2005	Beatriz Pécker	No radio commentary	Ainhoa Arbizu	
2006	Beatriz Pécker	No radio commentary	Sonia Ferrer	
2007	Beatriz Pécker	No radio commentary	Ainhoa Arbizu	
2008	José Luis Uribarri	No radio commentary	Ainhoa Arbizu	
2009	Joaquín Guzmán	No radio commentary	Iñaki del Moral	
2010	José Luis Uribarri	No radio commentary	Ainhoa Arbizu	
2011	José María Íñigo	No radio commentary	Elena S. Sánchez	
2012	José María Íñigo	No radio commentary	Elena S. Sánchez	
2013	José María Íñigo	No radio commentary	Inés Paz	
2014	José María Íñigo	Spanish: Paco González and Tiempo de juego team Catalan: Sergi Mas	Carolina Casado	
2015	José María Íñigo and Julia Varela	No radio commentary	Lara Siscar	
2016	José María Íñigo and Julia Varela	No radio commentary	Jota Abril	
2017	José María Íñigo and Julia Varela	No radio commentary	Nieves Álvarez	
2018	Tony Aguilar and Julia Varela	No radio commentary	Nieves Álvarez	
2019	Tony Aguilar and Julia Varela	Daniel Galindo	Nieves Álvarez	
2021	Tony Aguilar and Julia Varela	Imanol Durán	Nieves Álvarez	
2022	Tony Aguilar and Julia Varela	Imanol Durán, Sara Calvo and David Asensio	Nieves Álvarez	
2023	Tony Aguilar and Julia Varela	David Asensio, Imanol Durán, Irene Vaquero and Ángela Fernández	Ruth Lorenzo	
2024	Spanish: Tony Aguilar and Julia Varela; Catalan: (Note: Catalan-language commentary option available only in Catalonia.) Sònia Urbano and Xavi Martínez	Spanish: David Asensio, Sara Calvo, Ángela Fernández, Manu Martín-Albo and Luis Miguel Montes; Catalan: Sònia Urbano and Xavi Martínez	Soraya Arnelas	
2025	Spanish: Tony Aguilar and Julia Varela; Catalan: Sònia Urbano and Xavi Martínez	Spanish: David Asensio, Sara Calvo, and Luis Miguel Montes; Catalan: Sònia Urbano and Xavi Martínez	Chanel	
2026	No broadcast		Did not participate	

=== Stage directors and costume designers ===
Year	Stage director(s)	Costume designer(s)	Ref.
1968	Unknown	André Courrèges	
1969	Unknown	Manuel Pertegaz	
1971	Unknown	Antonio Nieto	
1979	Unknown	Undisclosed	
1980	Unknown	Jesús del Pozo	
1983	Unknown	Undisclosed (Note: Because the dress designed by Tony Benítez that Amaya was going to wear was not suitable for the stage, she had to wear the dress used in the video clip, and since she did not have matching shoes, she performed barefoot.)	
1984	Unknown	Jesús del Pozo	
1985	Unknown	José Ramón de Aguirre	
1988	Unknown	Francis Montesinos and Antonio Alvarado	
1989	Unknown	Mercedes Salazar	
1990	Unknown	Undisclosed (Note: Because the costumes designed by Francis Montesinos that Azúcar Moreno were going to wear broke during rehearsals, they had to wear their own dresses bought at El Rastro flea market.)	
1993	Unknown	Victorio & Lucchino	
1995	Leonor Parrilli	Javier Larraizar	
1999	Unknown	Ágatha Ruiz de la Prada	
2001	Unknown	Zara (Note: Because the suitcase with the outfit designed by Jean Paul Gaultier that Civera was going to wear was lost and never recovered, he had to wear the Zara outfit intended for rehearsals.)	
2002	Poty Castillo	Jorge Pérez (Note: Stylist of the performance, not designer of the outfit.)	
2003	Marieta Calderón	Etxart & Panno	
2005	Poty Castillo	Amparo Macías	
2008	Mayte Marcos	Undisclosed	
2009	Mayte Marcos	Juan Pedro López	
2010	Mayte Marcos	Carlo Pignatelli	
2011	Lola González	Sara Lage and Maru Calderón	
2012	Francis Viñolo	Cañavate	
2013	Unknown	Yolancris	
2014	Unknown	Karim Design (Note: Because the dress designed by Anmargo that Lorenzo was going to wear was not suitable for the stage lights, she had to borrow a dress from the Danish firm Karim Design.)	
2015	Tinet Rubira	José Fuentes	
2016	Niccolò Piccardi and Florian Boje	Raúl Amor	
2017	Hans Pannecoucke	Raúl Amor	
2018	Tinet Rubira	Teresa Helbig and Paco Varela	
2019	Fokas Evangelinos	Armani, Ana Margo and Guillermo Villanueva	
~~2020~~	~~Nicoline Refsing~~	~~Victoria Nogales~~	
2021	Marvin Dietmann	Jaime Álvarez	
2022	Kyle Hanagami	Palomo Spain	
2023	Bentor Albelo and Javier Rojo	Paola de Diego	
2024	Juan Sebastián and Israel Reyes	Michael Costello	
2025	Mario Ruiz	Gustavo Adolfo Tarí	

== Photo gallery ==
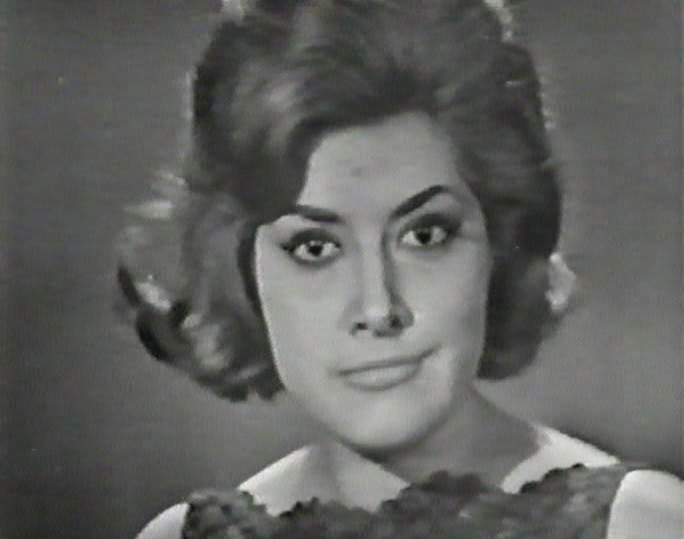
Conchita Bautista in Naples (1965)

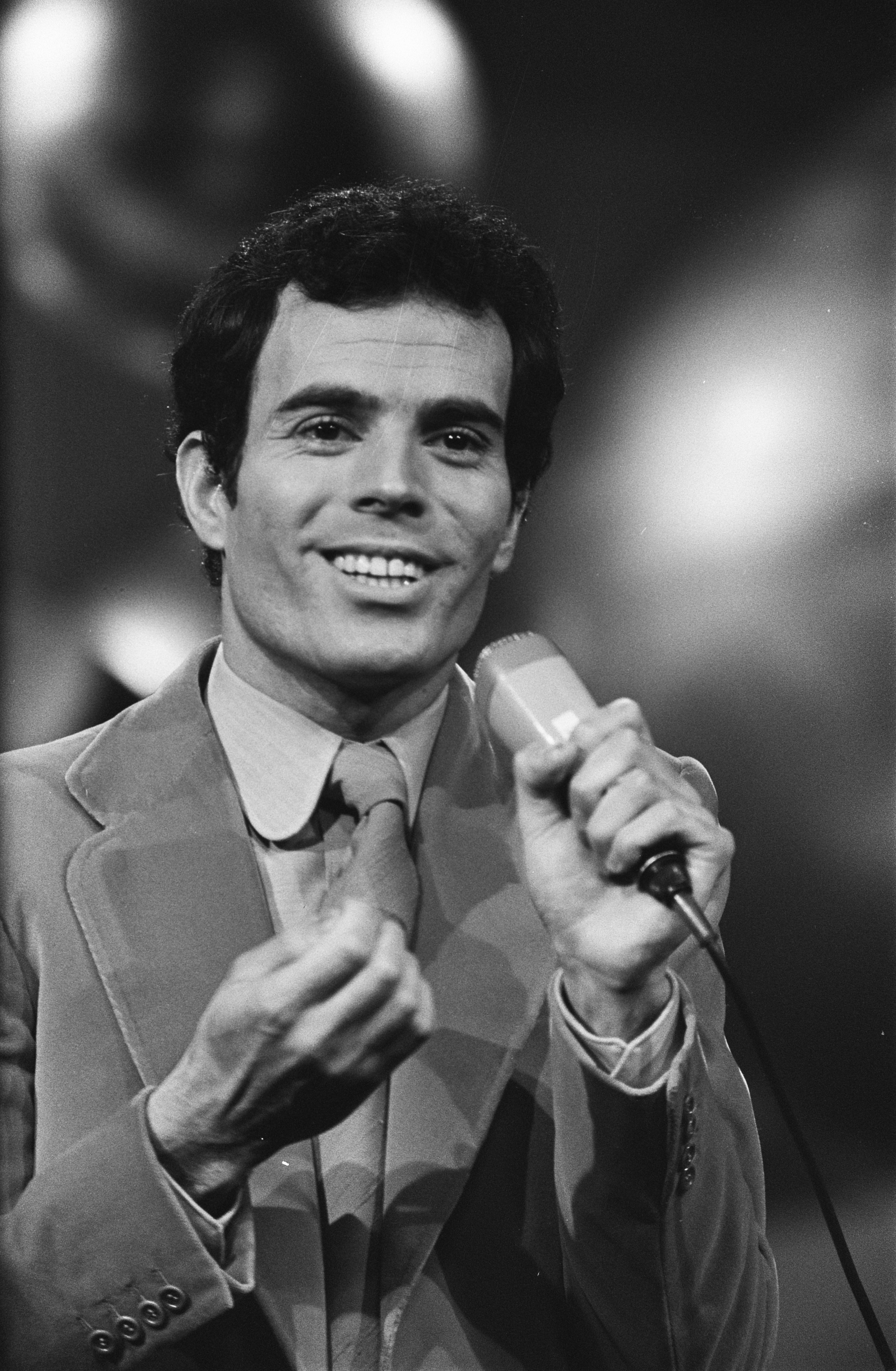
Julio Iglesias in Amsterdam (1970)

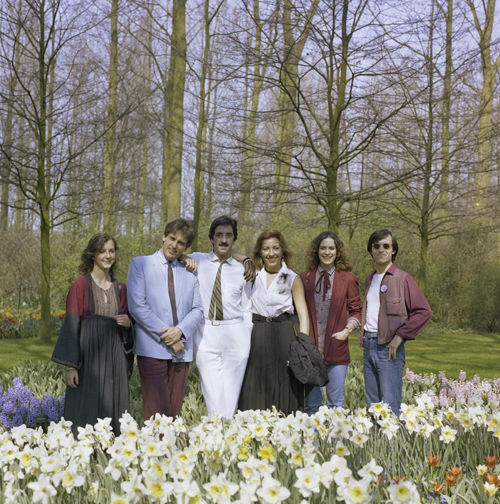
Trigo Limpio in The Hague (1980)

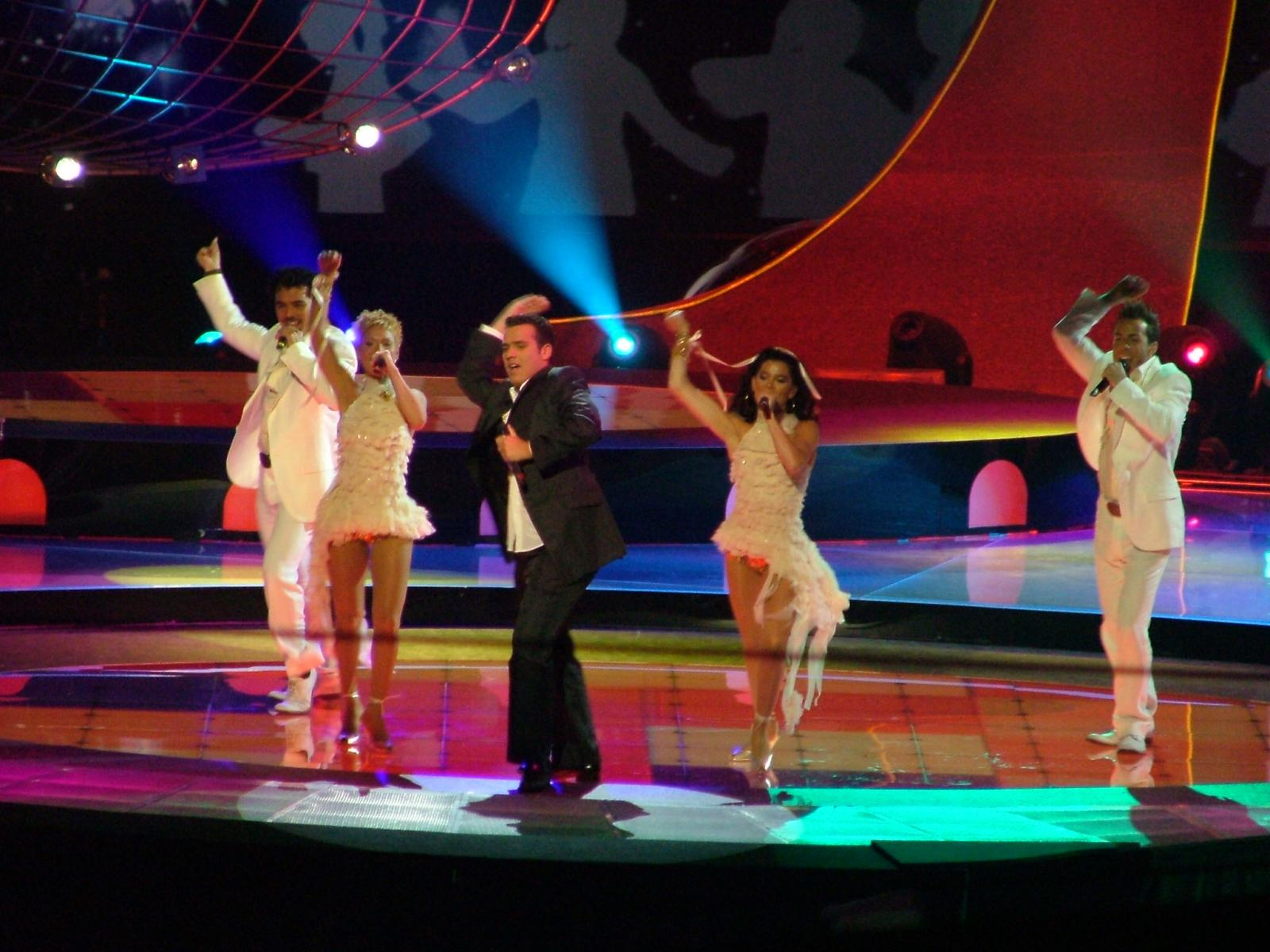
Ramón in Istanbul (2004)

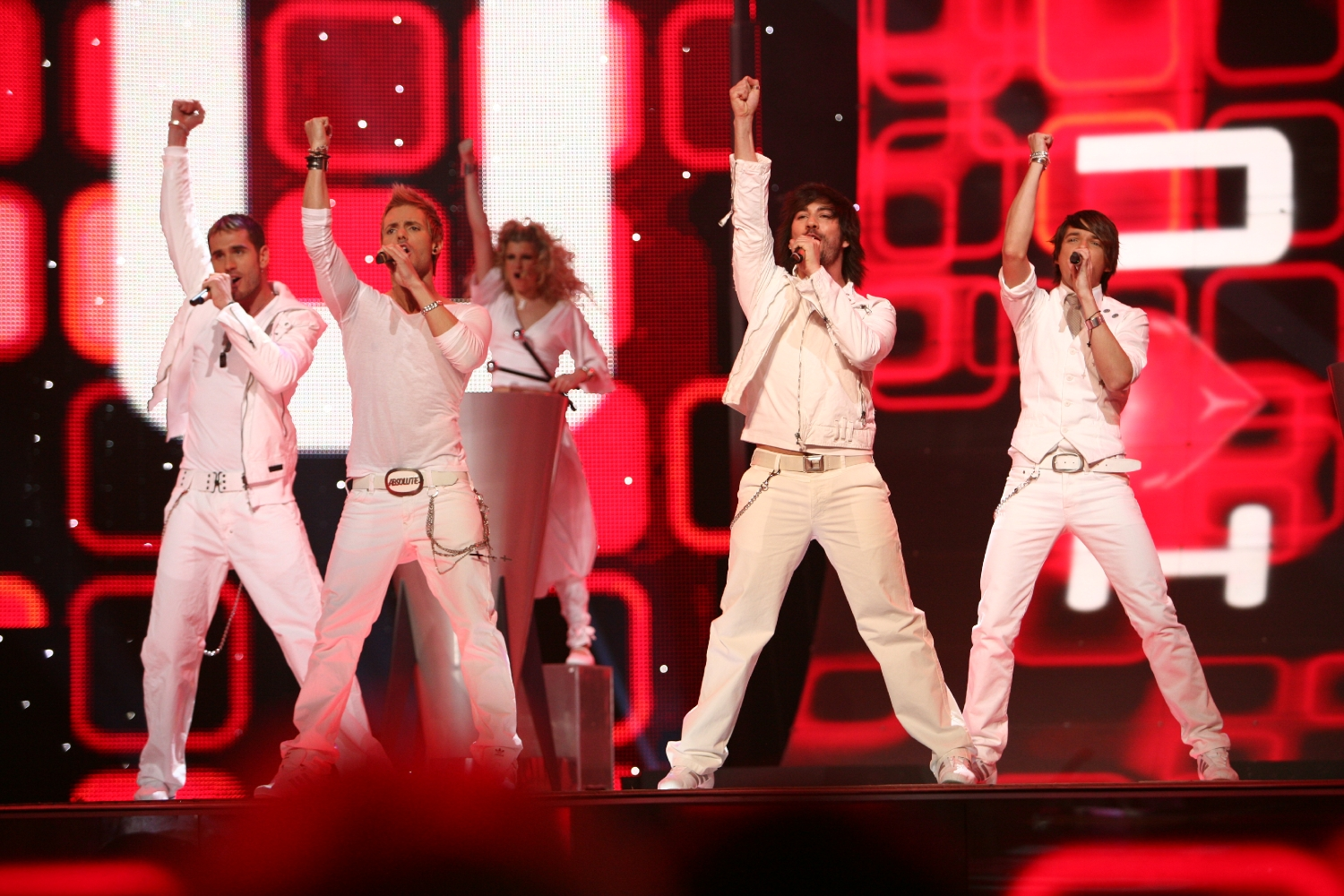
D'Nash in Helsinki (2007)

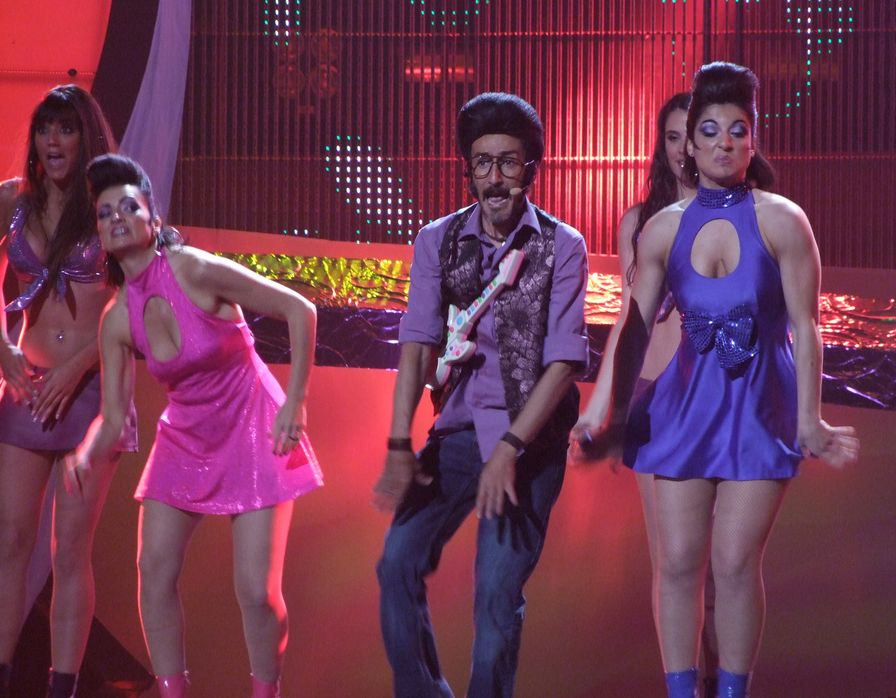
Rodolfo Chikilicuatre in Belgrade (2008)

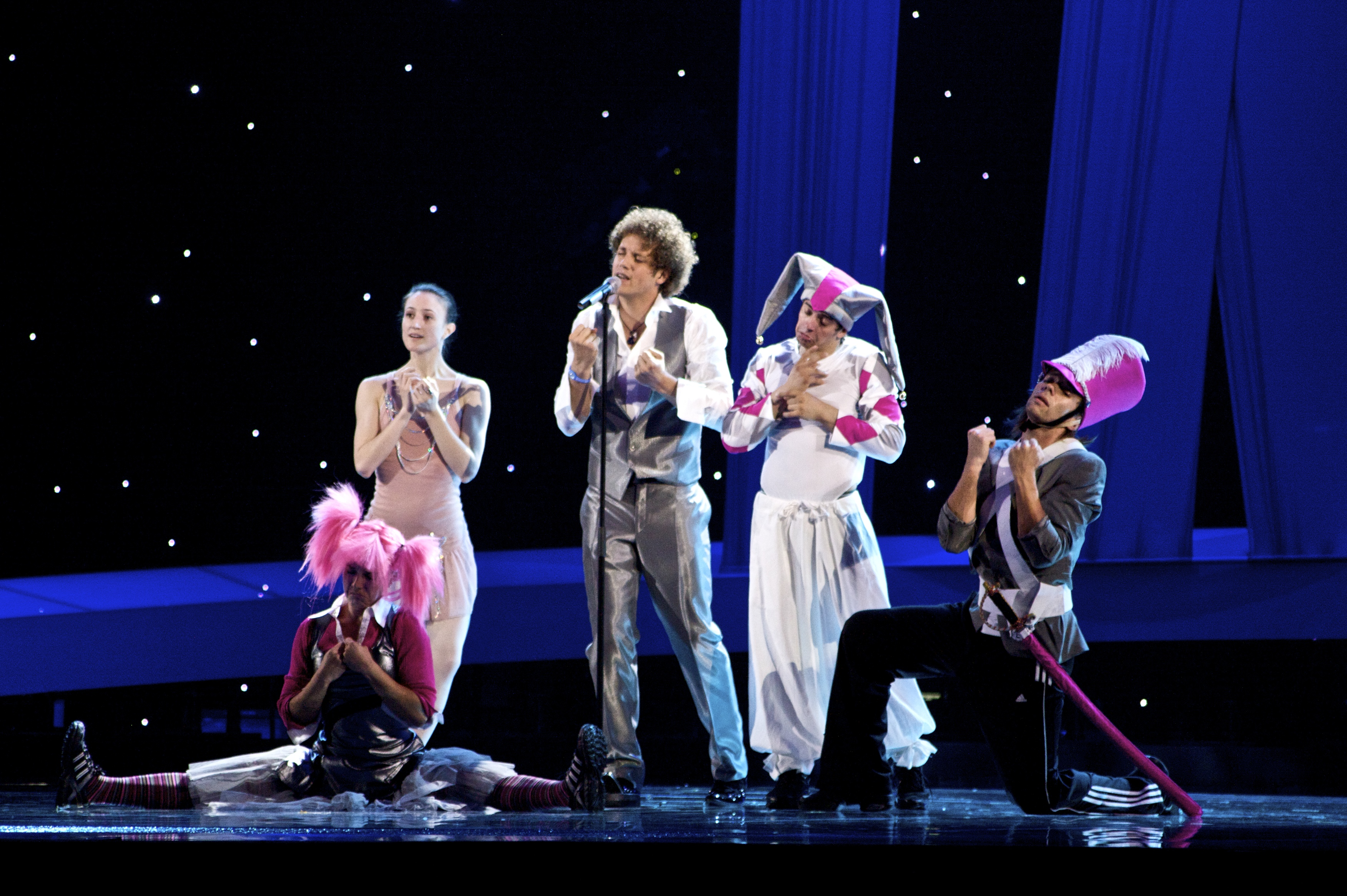
Daniel Diges in Oslo (2010)

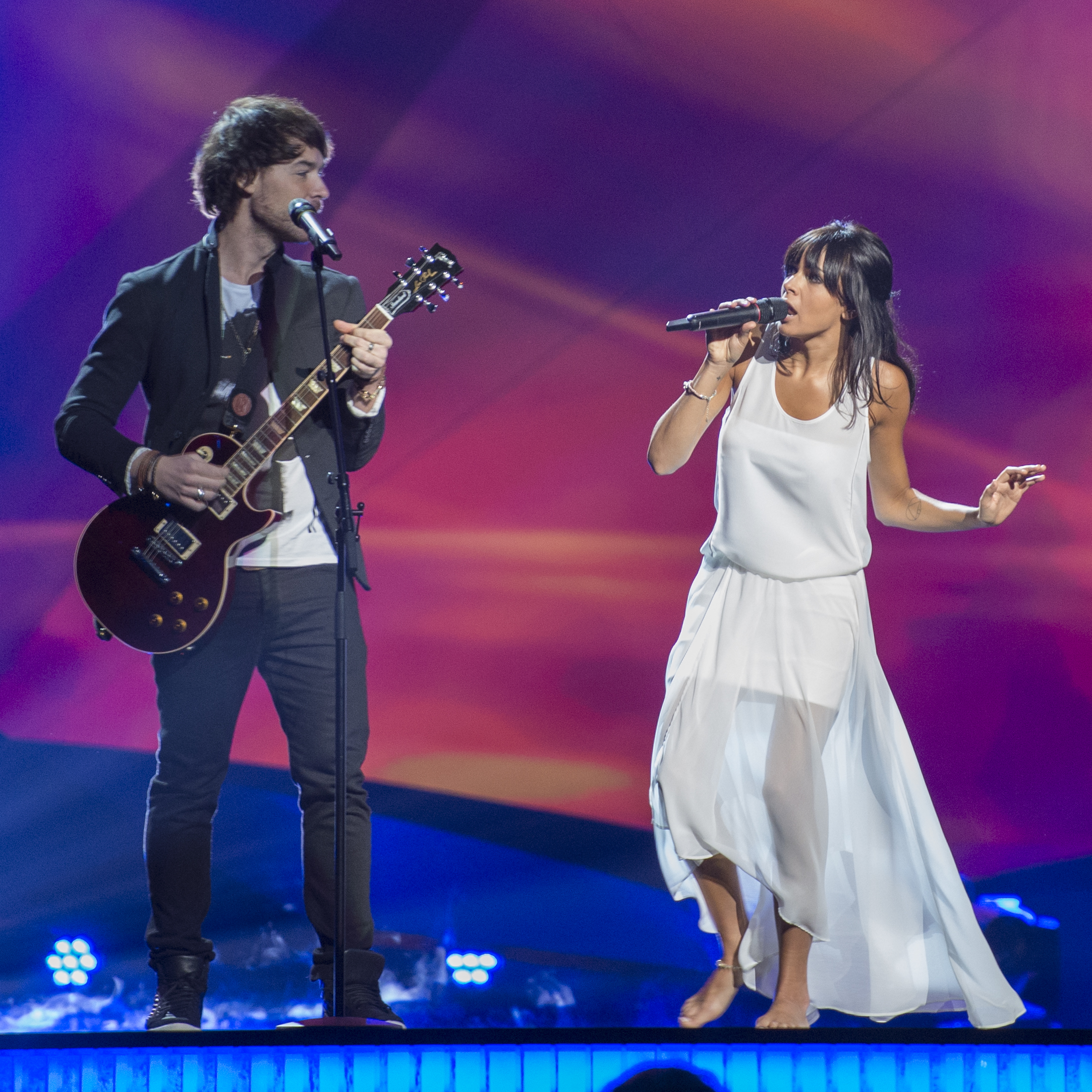
El Sueño de Morfeo in Malmö (2013)

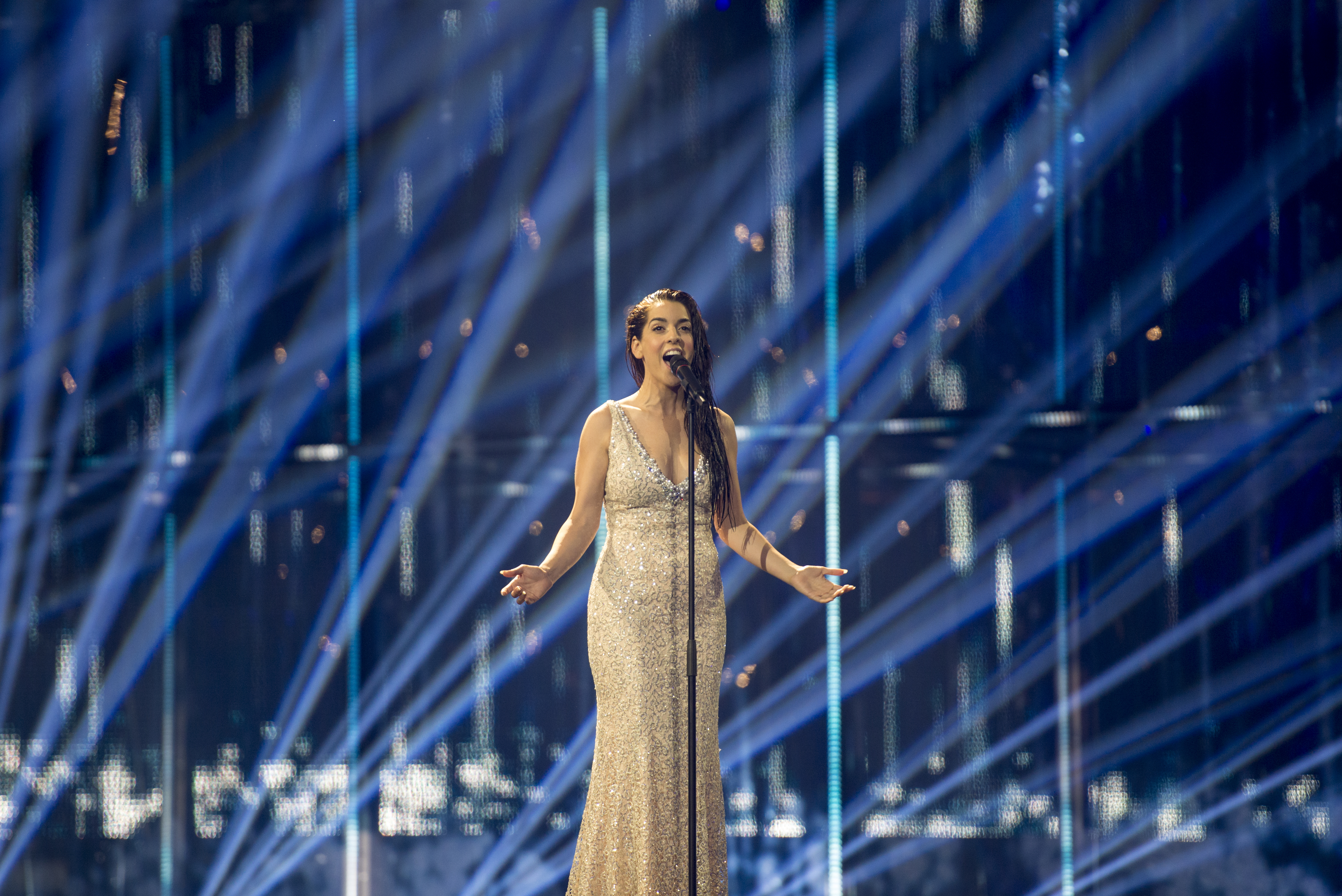
Ruth Lorenzo in Copenhagen (2014)

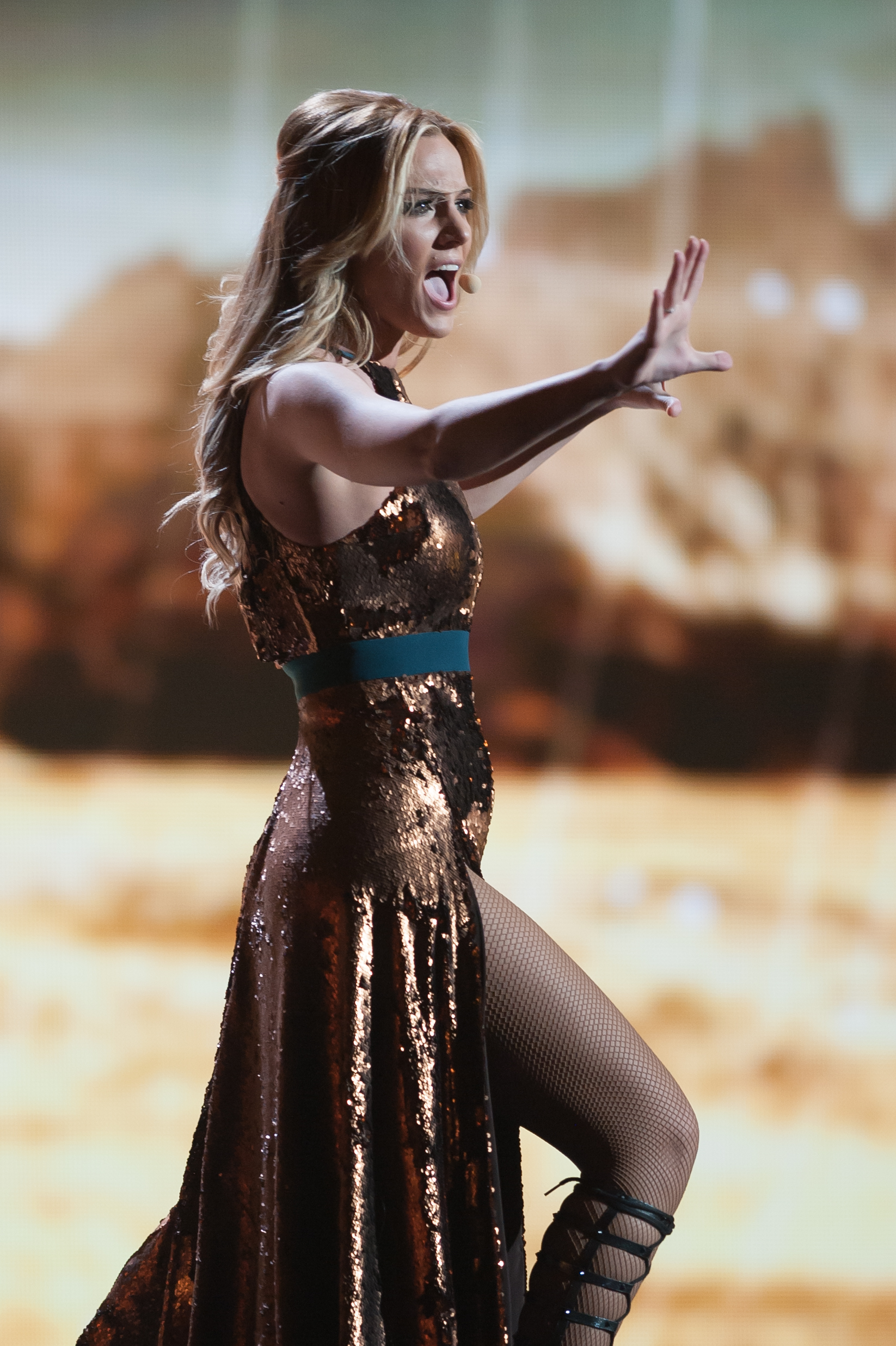
Edurne in Vienna (2015)

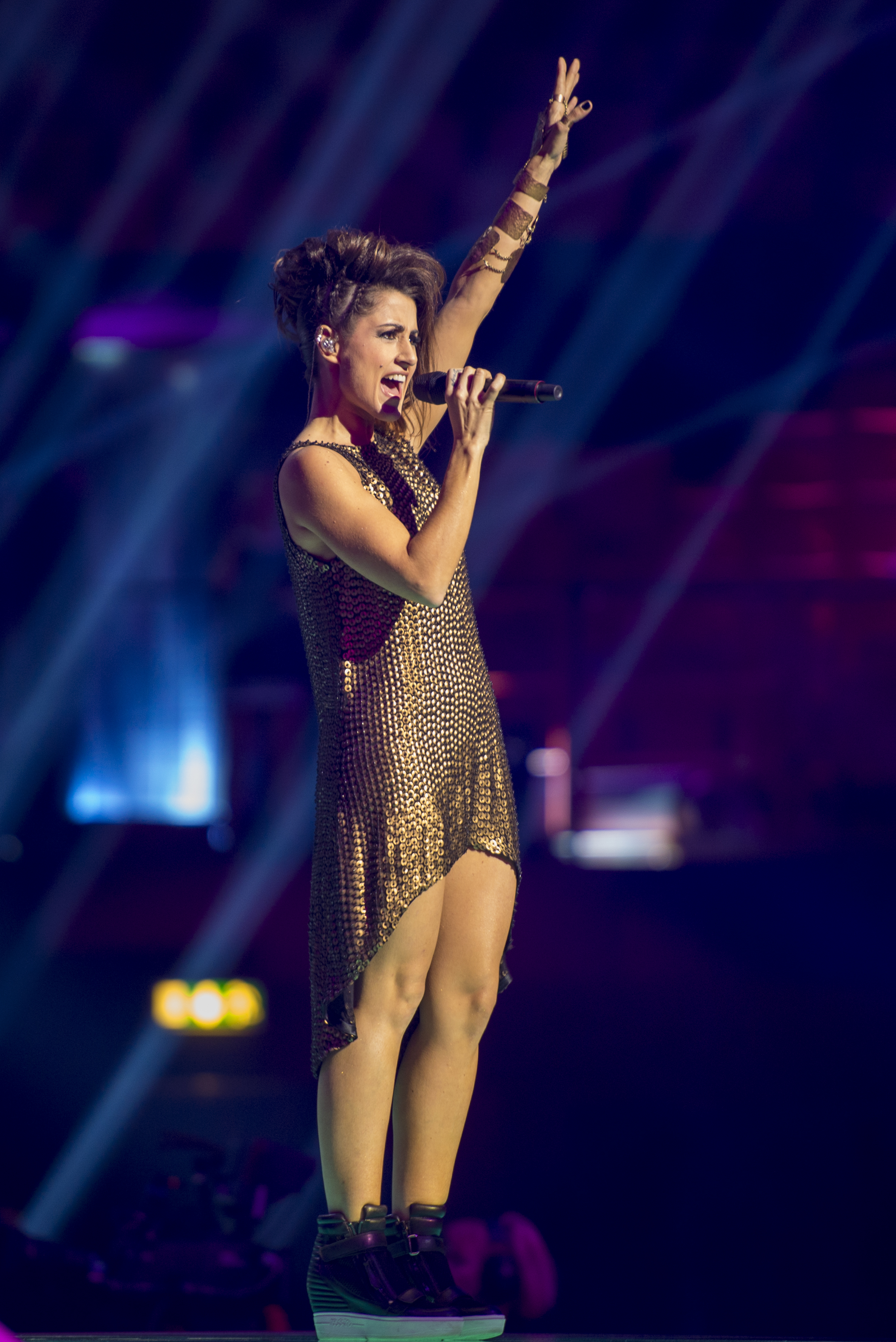
Barei in Stockholm (2016)

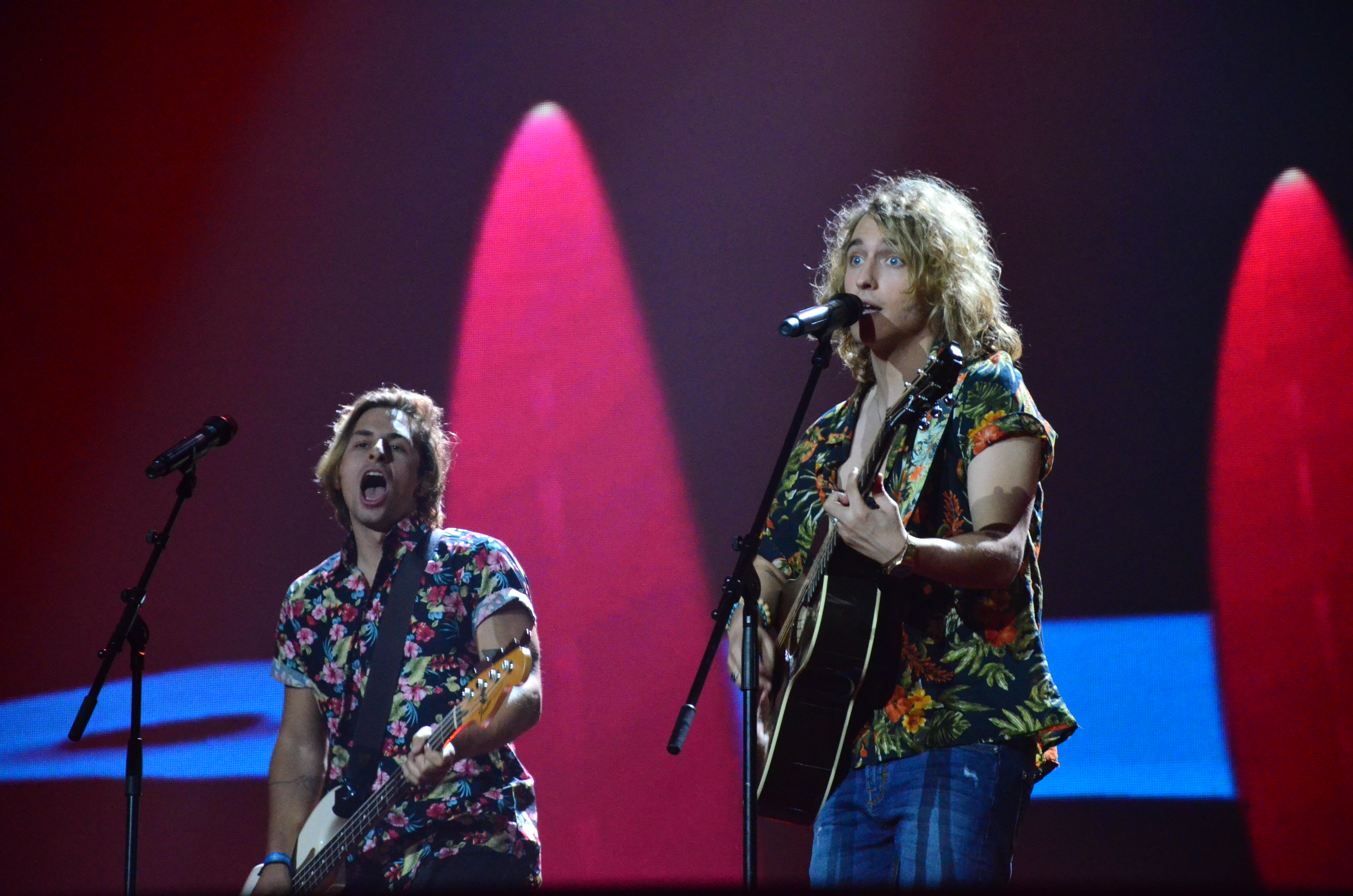
Manel Navarro in Kyiv (2017)

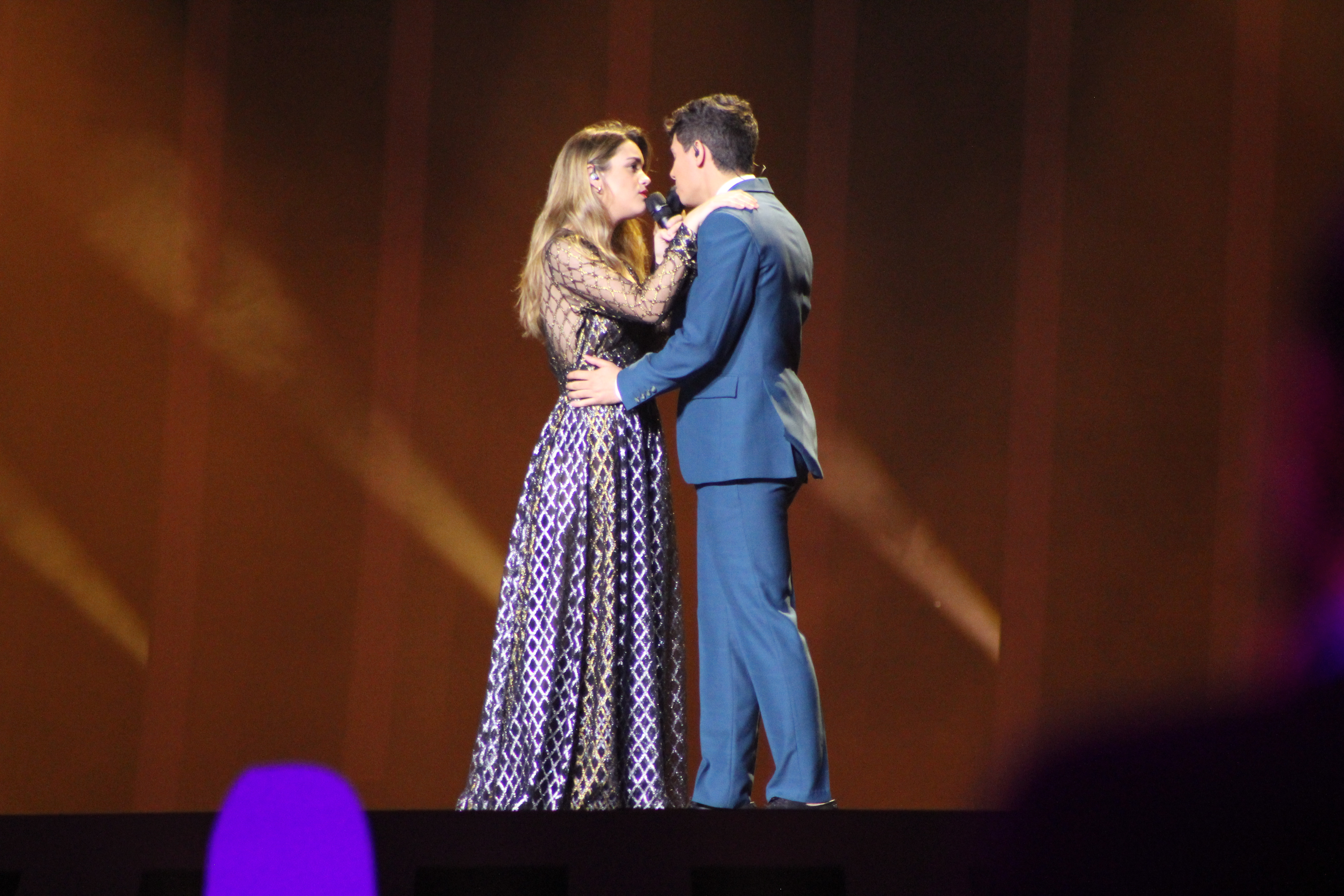
Amaia and Alfred in Lisbon (2018)

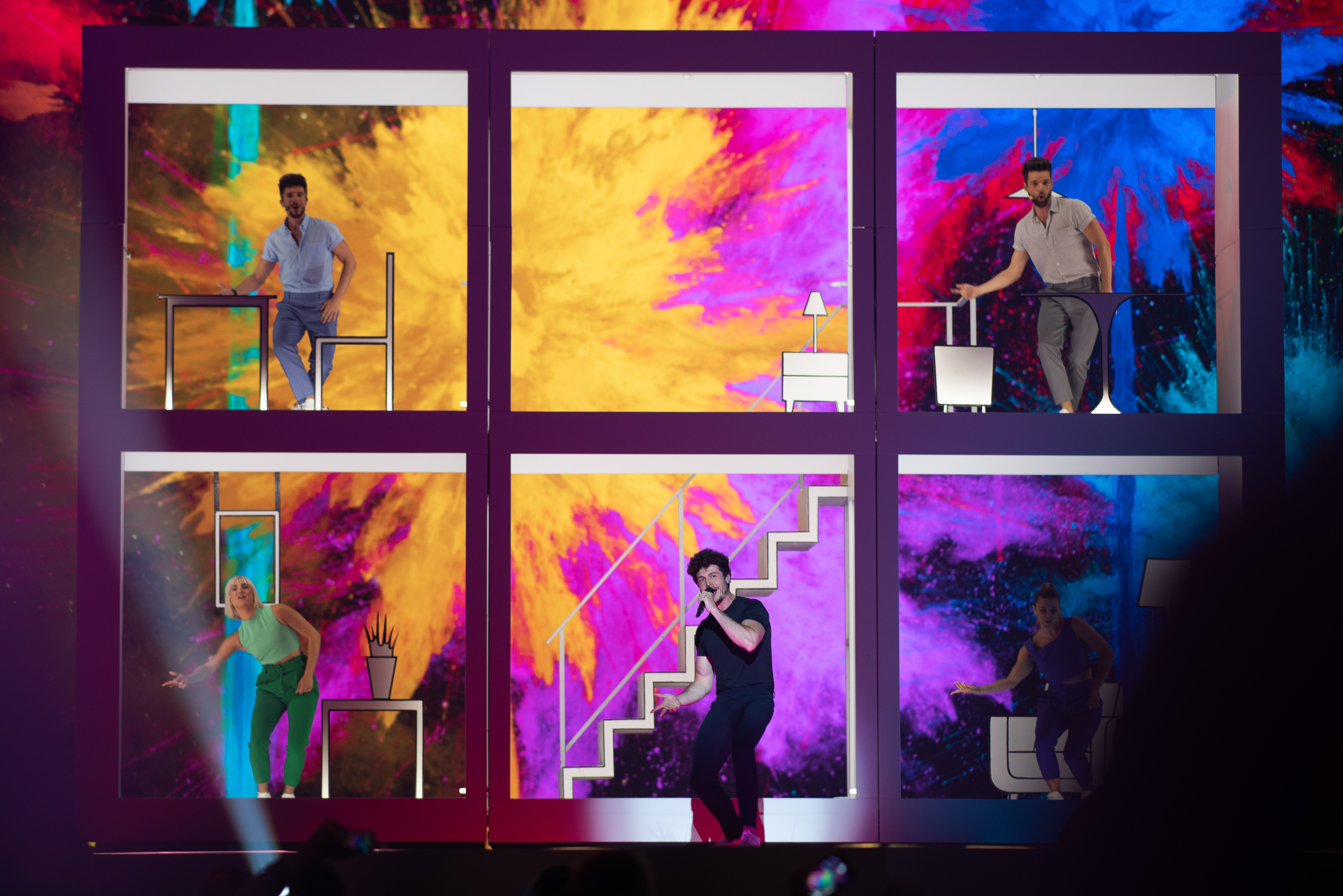
Miki in Tel Aviv (2019)

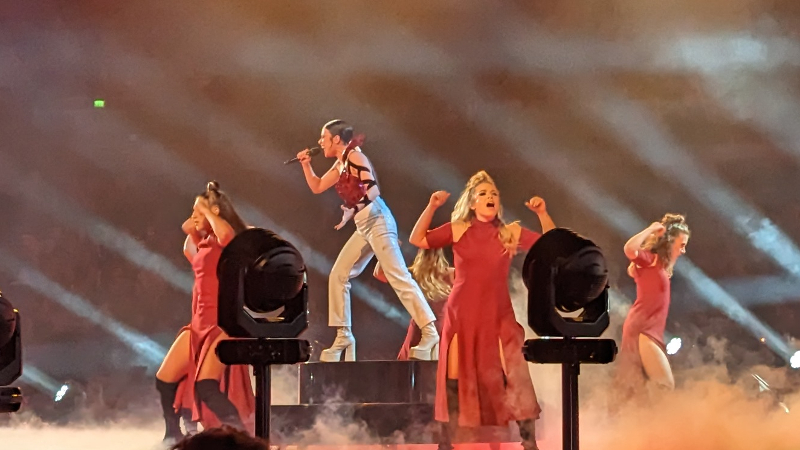
Blanca Paloma in Liverpool (2023)

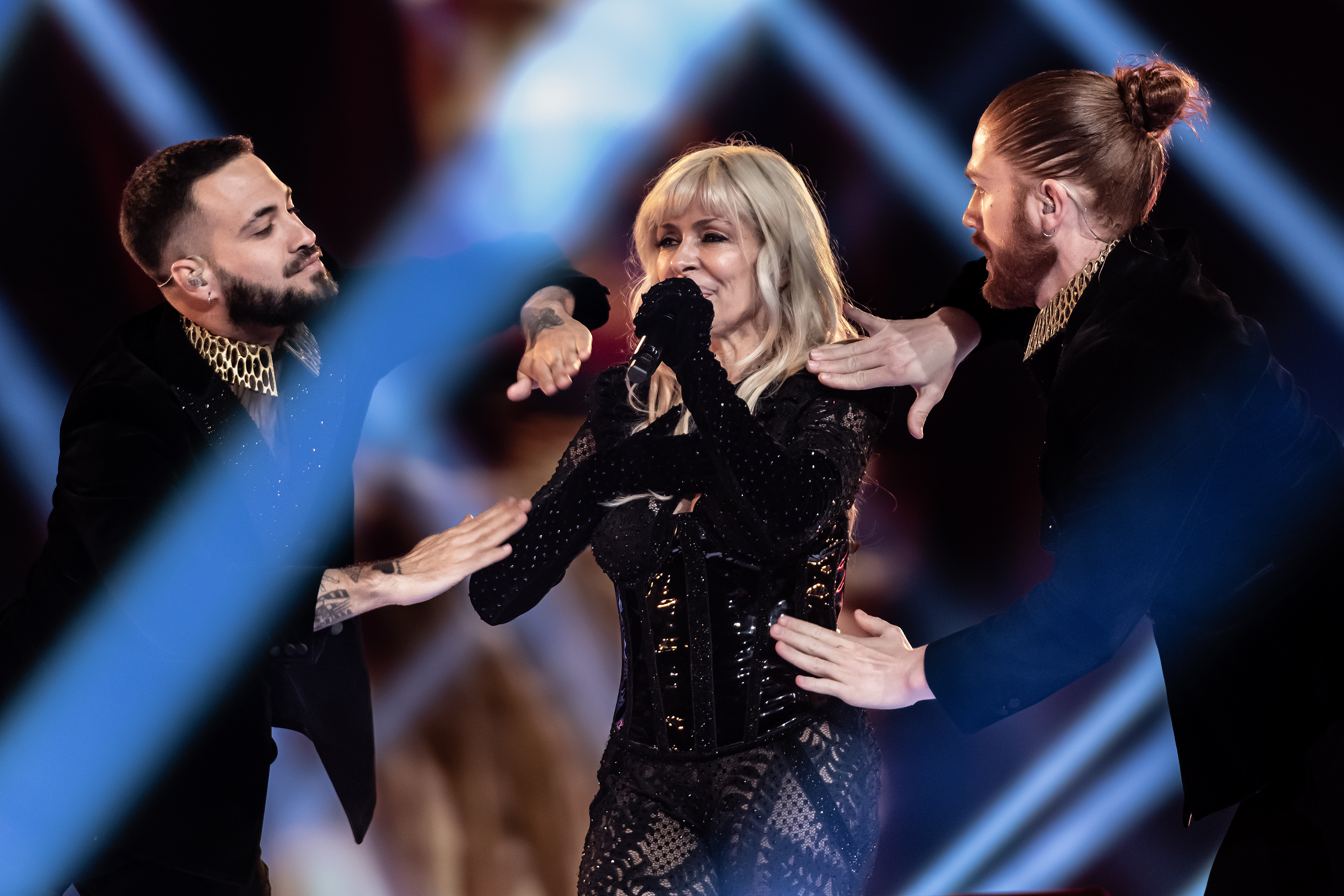
Nebulossa in Malmö (2024)

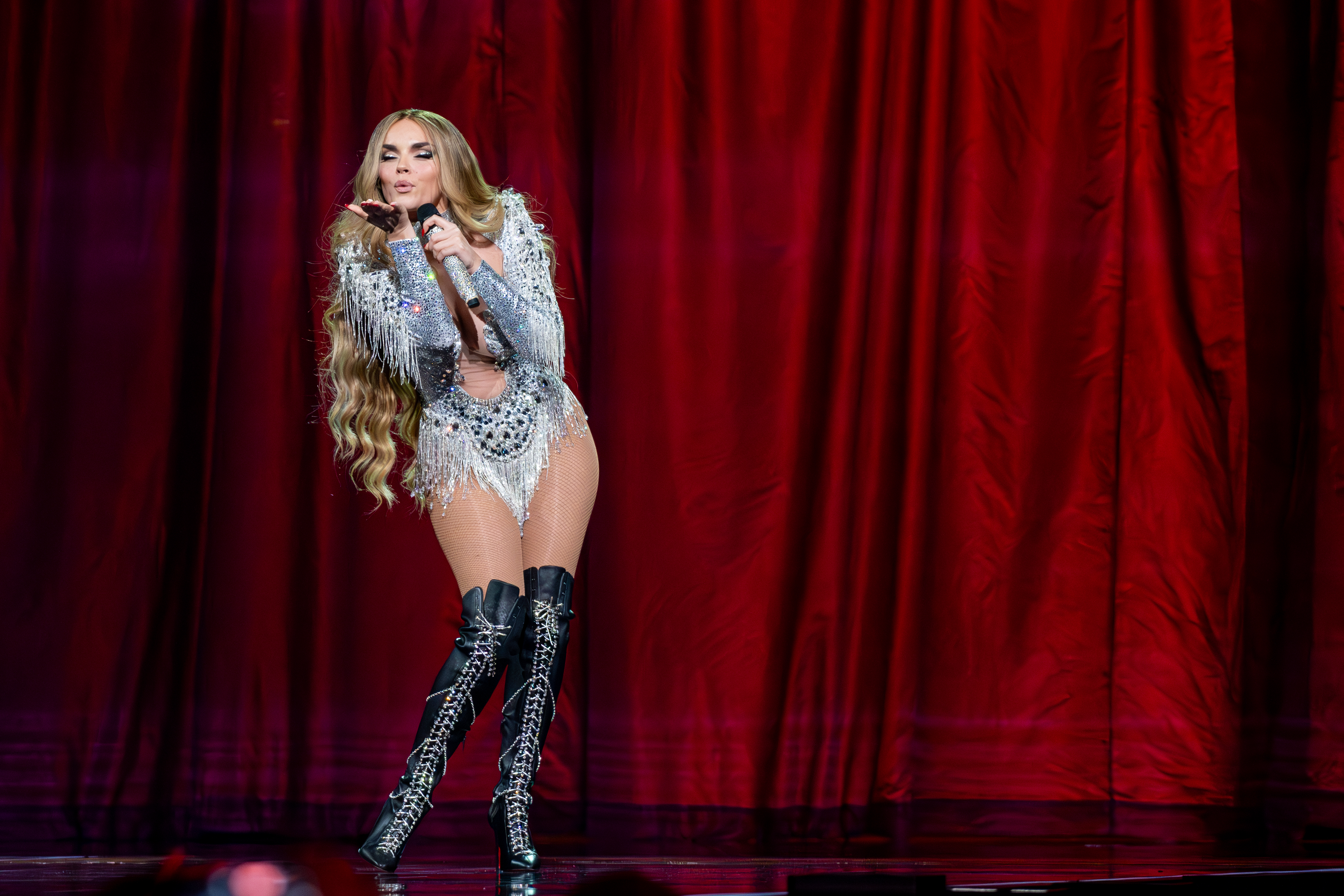
Melody in Basel (2025)

== See also ==
- Spain in the Junior Eurovision Song Contest – Junior version of the Eurovision Song Contest.
- Spain in the OTI Festival – A competition organised by Organización de Televisión Iberoamericana (OTI) between 1972 and 2000.
