= Tribbs =

Polish musician

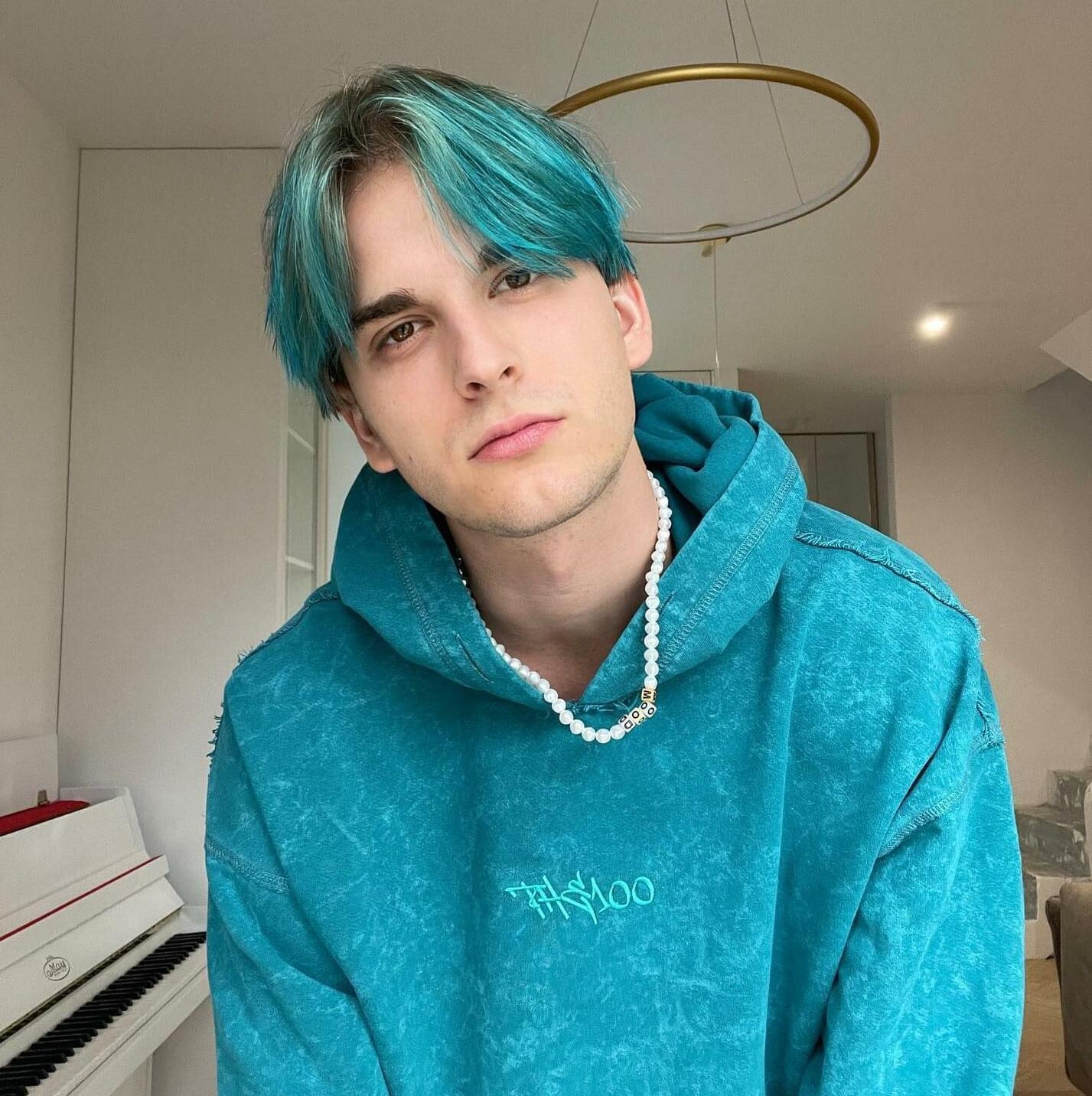
- Tribbs in 2023

Background information
- Born: 25 January 1996 (age 30); Warsaw, Poland
- Occupation: Musician, Songwriter, Producer, DJ
- Years active: 2016–present

Mikołaj Maciej Trybulec (born 25 January 1996), better known by his stage name Tribbs, is a Polish music producer, songwriter, DJ and bassist based in London. In the course of his career he has worked with various artists, many of whom international, as a producer. Tribbs has worked with and remixed tracks from various artists such as Alan Walker, Meghan Trainor, Becky Hill, Alok, Timmy Trumpet, Ella Henderson, Rudimental, Sam Feldt, and Remo Forrer. In addition, Tribbs has produced six songs that have represented various countries in the Eurovision Song Contest. He was declared the best Polish DJ according to the Polish DJs Chart in both 2022 and 2023.

== Career ==
=== Beginnings ===
Tribbs began his career as a bassist and session musician. He studied composition and arrangement in Katowice and sound creation at the Warsaw Film School, taking part in courses on sound synthesis and music production and learned principles of production software. As a session musician, he played the bass guitar, performed and recorded with artists such as Sound'n'Grace, Lanberry and Natalia Szroeder.

=== 2017–2020: Linia Nocna, Eurovision song producer, and side projects ===
In 2017, together with Monika Wydrzyńska, he founded the band Linia Nocna, focused on music that is an eclectic mixture of dance music, pop, ballads, and electropop. Their debut album, Znikam na chwilę, which was produced by Tribbs, was nominated at the Fryderyk Awards in 2018, in the category "Album of the Year Electronics". Tribbs produced "Friend of a Friend", which represented Czech Republic in the Eurovision Song Contest 2019 and "Universo", which was set to represent Spain in the Eurovision Song Contest 2020, prior to the contest's cancellation due to COVID-19. Another album from Linia Nocna, entitled Szepty i dropy, was released in 2020.

While in Linia Nocna, Tribbs began work on alternative projects simultaneously, he took part in many musical projects as a bass guitarist. He took part in the album Początek, from the band Sound'n'Grace and the album Kawalerka from Bitamina. Since then, he has also taken up creating songs for other artists.

=== 2021–present: Continued success, international recognition, and The Voice Kids coach ===
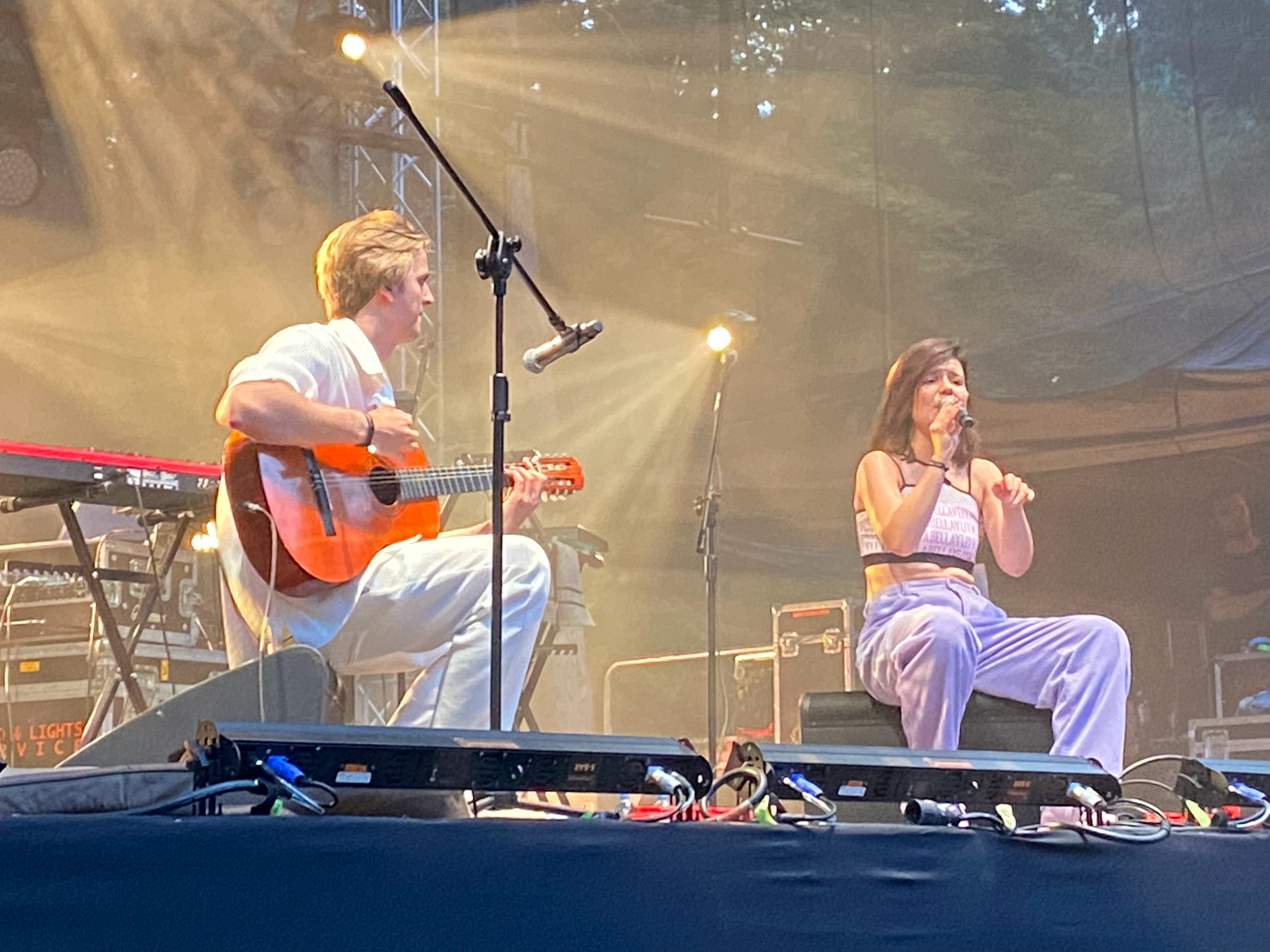
Tribbs with Moniką Wydrzyńską as a part of Linia Nocna in 2021

In 2021, Tribbs released a cover of Budka Suflera's single "Bal wszystkich świętych"; by November 2023, the remake had over 36 million views on YouTube. Also in 2021, the song "Duże oczy", produced for Smolasty, was released. By November 2023, the song gained more than 123 million views on YouTube. Tribbs produced his third Eurovision single in 2021, "Amen", which represented Austria in the Eurovision Song Contest 2021.

In 2022, in collaboration with rapper Kubańczyk, he released a cover of Krzysztof Krawczyk's hit "Ostatni raz zatańczysz ze mną". The song became frequently played on the radio, and by 2023 it had reached over 10 million plays on Spotify. The music video for the song reached over 100 million views on YouTube. At the same time, several other songs that Tribbs produced appeared on Polish radio stations, including "Bad Touch" with Pelican, "Ghost" with Vamero and Philip Strand, "Never Ending Story" with Daria", and "River" by Krystian Ochman. The latter single represented Poland in the Eurovision Song Contest 2022. Later in 2022, Tribbs embarked on his first concert tour in Poland.

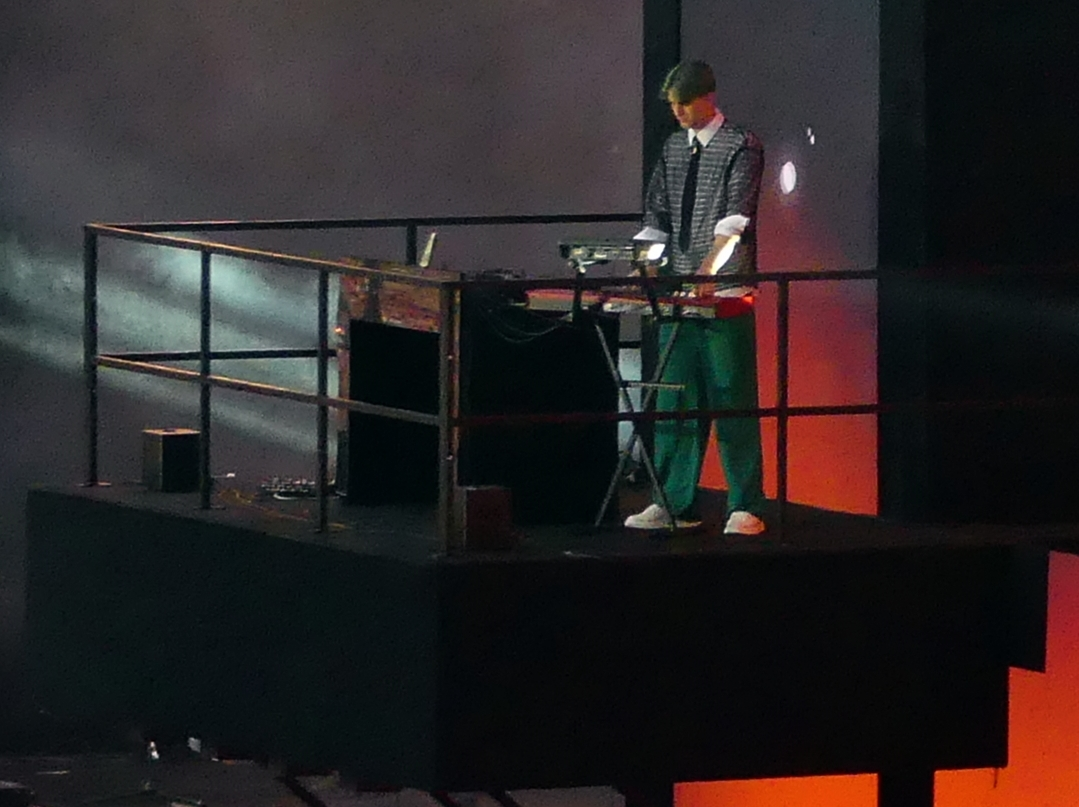
Tribbs at the 2023 European Games

In 2023, he released the song "Without You", which reached third place on the list of the most played songs on radio stations in the Czech Republic. In March 2023, he was nominated for the Fryderyk Award for Best New Performance. In the first half of 2023, he released the singles "Ta noc" (with Kubańczyk) and a cover of the Maanam's hit, "Krakowski spleen". He co-produced two songs taking part in the Eurovision Song Contest 2023: "Solo" by Blanka and "Watergun" by Remo Forrer. In June 2023, he was one of the artists taking part in the opening ceremony of the 2023 European Games in Kraków and opened the "Generation of Freedom" concert in Gdańsk. In July, he released the single "Stay All Night" (with the duo Bright Sparks), which was used as the theme for the fifth season of the reality show Temptation Island, broadcast in the United States. In November 2023, he released the single "Let's Get Fkd Up", which he recorded with Alok. Following this, Tribbs released the singles: "Mbappe" (with Kubańczyk and Smolasty), "Just Us" (with Roksana Węgiel), "Kiedyś cię znajdę" (a cover of a song by Reni Jusis), and "Dzięki, że jesteś" (with Lanberry). On December 6, 2023, he released his first solo album entitled MT. The same month, he took first place in the annual poll of the Polish DJ's Chart, managing to do so for the second time in a row, as the first DJ in the history of this list.

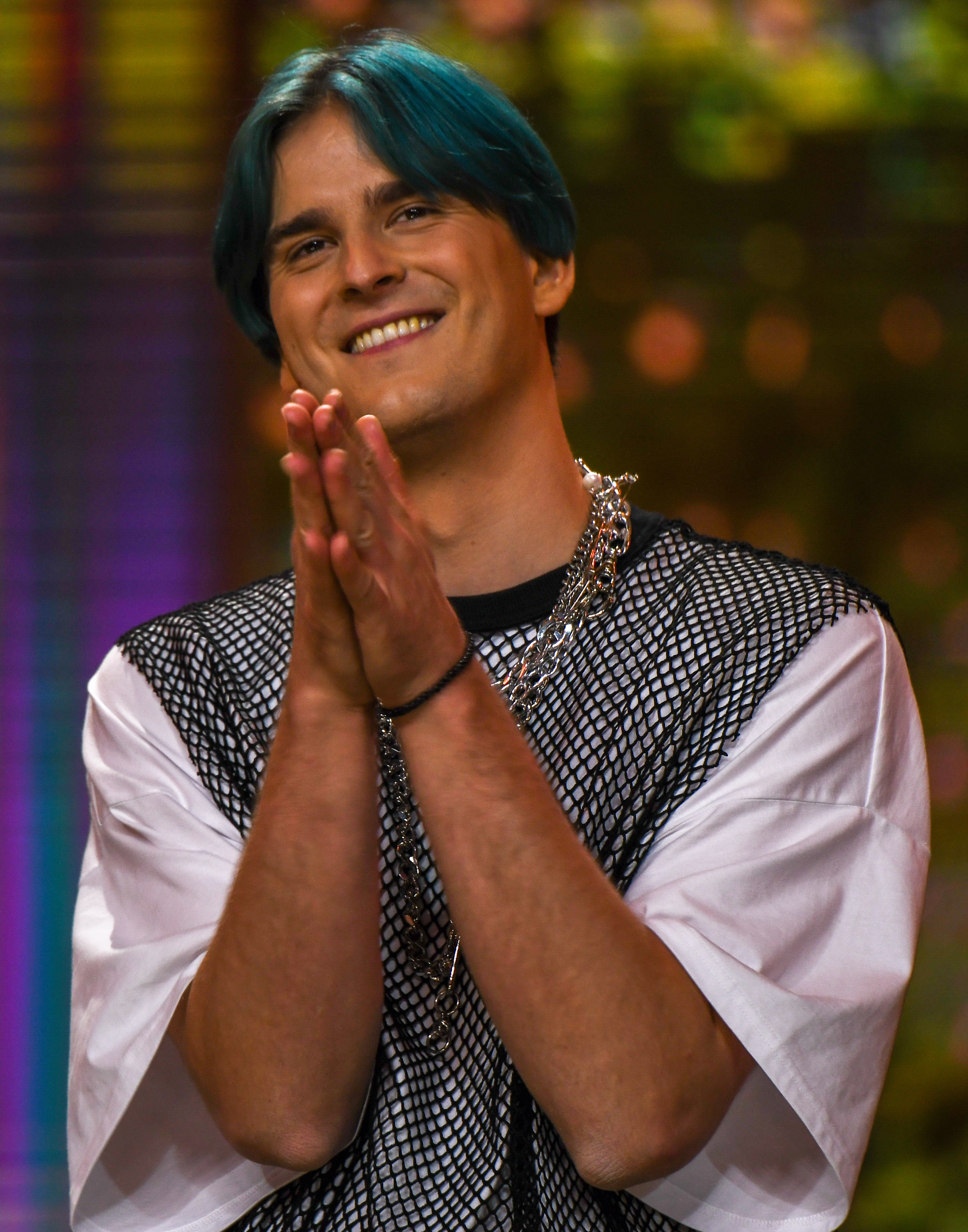
Tribbs at the Polsat SuperHit Festiwal 2023

In January 2024, his single "Close Your Eyes" was released together with Stephen Puth and Lucas Estrada. In March 2024, Tribbs' official remix of Alan Walker's "Fire" was released, with vocals from American singer JVKE. Another remix released in March 2024 was a reworking of the song "Alibi" performed by Ella Henderson and the band Rudimental. In May 2024, Tribbs released his remix of Becky Hill's song "Outside of Love". The following month, he announced the release of the remix for the song "Been Like This", a song by Meghan Trainor. In July 2024, he played for the first time on the stage of the Ushuaïa Club in Ibiza. Tribbs also released numerous singles with fellow musicians such as "Tragic" with Vanessa Mai.

In January 2025, he performed at the Festivaland in Warsaw. His first single in 2025 was a cover of the folk song "W moim ogródecki", which was created in collaboration with Ardo, Jakem Alva and Diiya. On 16 March 2025, he performed at the Atlas Arena in Łódź as part of the support of Alan Walker's concert. In April, he released a remix of Walker's song "Dancing in Love". It was the second collaboration between the two artists. In May, Tribbs appeared as a special guest at the final of the eighth edition of the TVP2 program The Voice Kids. He also appeared on the Polsat Hit Festival 2025 stage for the third time in his career. In June, he hosted the "Debuts" concert during the 62nd National Festival of Polish Song, Opole 2025. On 30 July 2025, it was announced that Tribbs had joined the coaching line-up for the ninth edition of The Voice Kids. The edition aired in early 2026 and Tribbs was the winning coach when his final artist Wiktor Sas won the season. He then went on to produce Sas’ song “Gravity”, which was Poland’s entry for the Junior Eurovision Song Contest 2026. At the contest, the song finished in 6th place, receiving a total of 144 points.

== Discography ==
=== Albums ===
- MT – 2023

=== Remixes ===
- Alan Walker and MEEK "Dancing In Love" (Tribbs Remix) 2025

=== Singles ===
- 2020 : "Bedroom"
- 2020 : "Chains"
- 2020 : "Lights
- 2021 : "Collide"
- 2021 : "Same Stars"
- 2021 : "Whisky"
- 2021 : "Ratuj"
- 2022 : "Ghost"
- 2022 : "Smak słów" (remix)
- 2022 : "300"
- 2022 : "Sezon"
- 2022 : "Dzisiaj"
- 2022 : "All Night"
- 2022 : "Acapulco" (remix)
- 2022 : "Nirvana"
- 2022 : "Future Champ"
- 2022 : "Boys oh Boys"
- 2023 : "Without You"
- 2023 : "Ta noc"
- 2023 : "Mbappe"
- 2023 : "Just Us"
- 2023 : "Stay All Night"
- 2023 : "Tak jak Ty"
- 2023 : "Dzięki, że jesteś"
- 2023 : "Let's Get Fkd Up"
- 2024 : "Close Your Eyes"
- 2024 : "To Be Loved"
- 2024 : "Enough"
- 2024 : "Keine Zeit zu verlieren"
- 2024 : "Fire!" (remix)
- 2024 : "Alibi" (remix)
- 2024 : "Nad wodę"
- 2024 : "Tragic (Never Let Go)"
- 2024 : "Suavemente"
- 2024 : "Outside of Love" (remix)
- 2024 : "Gasolina"
- 2024 : "Been Like This" (remix)
- 2024 : "Breathe"
- 2024 : "Haunted"
- 2024 : "River
- 2024 : "All Around the World"
- 2024 : "Sad Girl Summer (Not Again)" (remix)
- 2024 : "Molly"
- 2024 : "Homesick 4 U"
- 2024 : "Drink & Drugs & Sex & Money"
- 2024 : "Femme Like U" (remix)
- 2024 : "Can't Get Enough (Dr. Feelgood)"
- 2025 : "Pump It Up" (remix)
- 2025 : "Dancing in Love" (remix)
- 2025 : "Dokola"
- 2025 : "Like You Do" (with Sam Feldt, Andy Dust and Dotter)
- 2025 : "Ale To Juz Bylo" (remix)
- 2025 : "Never Be Gone" (with Adam Woods)
