= Complicado =

Studio album by Blas Cantó
- Released: 14 September 2018
- Recorded: 2017
- Genre: Pop
- Label: Warner Music Spain

Singles from Complicado
- 1. "In Your Bed" Released: 3 March 2017; 2. "Drunk and Irresponsible" Released: 25 August 2017; 3. "Él no soy yo" Released: 9 March 2018; 4. "No volveré (A seguir tus pasos)" Released: 14 September 2018; 5. "Si te vas" Released: 25 July 2019

Complicado is the debut studio album by Spanish singer Blas Cantó. It was released on 14 September 2018 by Warner Music Spain. The album includes the singles "In Your Bed", "Drunk and Irresponsible", "Él no soy yo" and "No volveré (A seguir tus pasos)". The album peaked at number 1 on the Spanish Albums Chart. The album was re-released on 6 September 2019 titled Complicados.

== Singles ==
"In Your Bed" was released as the first single from the album on 3 March 2017. The song peaked at number 57 on the Spanish Singles Chart. "Drunk and Irresponsible" was released as the second single from the album on 25 August 2017. "Él no soy yo" was released as the third single from the album on 9 March 2018. The song peaked at number 35 on the Spanish Singles Chart and stayed on the list for forty weeks, achieving a platinum certification. "No volveré (A seguir tus pasos)" was released as the fourth and final single from the album on 14 September 2018. "Si te vas" was released as the lead single from the re-released album Complicados on 25 July 2019.

== Track listing ==
Standard edition
| No. | Title | Length |
|---|---|---|
| 1. | "Él no soy yo" | 4:39 |
| 2. | "No volveré (A seguir tus pasos)" | 3:21 |
| 3. | "Save Me" | 2:57 |
| 4. | "In Your Bed" | 3:07 |
| 5. | "Dejarte ir" (feat. Leire Martínez) | 3:29 |
| 6. | "Complicado" | 3:45 |
| 7. | "Algo más" (feat. Beatriz Luengo) | 4:01 |
| 8. | "Héroe" | 3:22 |
| 9. | "Sed de ti" | 3:42 |
| 10. | "Drunk and Irresponsible" | 3:03 |
| 11. | "Si eres tú..." | 4:11 |
| 12. | "Desde mi infierno" | 3:21 |

Deluxe edition
| No. | Title | Length |
|---|---|---|
| 13. | "Back To The 80's" | 3:30 |
| 14. | "Tan solo un recuerdo" | 3:55 |
| 15. | "What If You?" | 4:12 |
| 16. | "Treat Her Right" | 3:43 |

Complicados
| No. | Title | Length |
|---|---|---|
| 13. | "Si te vas" | 3:28 |
| 14. | "Volver a bailar" | 3:33 |
| 15. | "No te vayas" | 3:11 |
| 16. | "Tantos bailes" (Marta Soto feat. Blas Cantó) | 4:23 |
| 17. | "Hang Ups" (Blas Cantó & Scott Helman) (Remix) | 3:07 |
| 18. | "Él no soy yo" (Versión acústica) | 4:23 |
| 19. | "Dejarte ir" (Versión acústica) | 3:14 |
| 20. | "Complicado" (Versión acústica) | 4:04 |
| 21. | "No volveré (A seguir tus pasos)" (Versión acústica) | 3:28 |
| 22. | "Algo más" (feat. Beatriz Luengo (Versión acústica)) | 4:02 |

== Charts ==
=== Weekly charts ===
Weekly chart performance for Complicado
| Chart (2018) | Peak position |
|---|---|
| Spanish Albums (PROMUSICAE) | 1 |

=== Year-end charts ===
Year-end chart performance for Complicado
| Chart (2018) | Position |
|---|---|
| Spanish Albums (PROMUSICAE) | 55 |
| Chart (2019) | Position |
| Spanish Albums (PROMUSICAE) | 74 |

== Release history ==
| Country | Date | Label | Format |
|---|---|---|---|
| Spain | 14 September 2018 | Warner Music Spain | Digital download; streaming |
