= Universo (song) =

2020 song by Blas Cantó

Single by Blas Cantó
- Language: Spanish
- Released: 30 January 2020
- Genre: Pop; synth-pop
- Length: 3:02
- Label: Warner Music Spain
- Composers: Blas Cantó; Dan Hammond; Ashley Hicklin; Dangelo Ortega; Mikołaj Trybulec
- Lyricists: Blas Cantó; Dan Hammond
- Producers: Dan Hammond; Mikołaj Trybulec

Blas Cantó singles chronology
| "Si te vas" (2019) | "Universo" (2020) | "Mi luz" (2020) |

Music video
- "Universo" on YouTube

Eurovision Song Contest 2020 entry
- Country: Spain
- Artist: Blas Cantó
- Language: Spanish
- Composers: Blas Cantó; Dan Hammond; Ash Hicklin; Mikołaj Trybulec; Dangelo Ortega
- Lyricists: Blas Cantó; Dan Hammond

Finals performance
- Final result: Contest cancelled

Entry chronology
- ◄ "La venda" (2019)
- "Voy a quedarme" (2021) ►

"Universo" is a song by Spanish singer Blas Cantó written by himself, Dan Hammond, Ashley Hicklin, Dangelo Ortega, and Mikołaj Trybulec, and produced by Hammond and Trybulec. The song would have represented Spain in the Eurovision Song Contest 2020 at Rotterdam.

== Background ==
=== Conception ===
"Universo" was written by Blas Cantó, Dan Hammond, Ashley Hicklin, Dangelo Ortega, and Mikołaj Trybulec, and produced by Hammond and Trybulec; the latter also co-wrote and produced "Friend of a Friend" who represented the Czech Republic in Eurovision 2019.

=== Eurovision ===
On 5 October 2019, Radiotelevisión Española (RTVE) announced that they had internally selected singer Blas Cantó as their performer for the 65th edition of the Eurovision Song Contest. On 30 January 2020, RTVE announced "Universo" as the entry for Eurovision. The promotion of the song was focused in Spain, including a performance on the fourth gala of series 11 of Operación Triunfo on 10 February.

However, the Eurovision Song Contest, which would have been held on 12–16 May 2020 in Rotterdam, was cancelled due to the COVID-19 pandemic. On 18 March 2020, RTVE confirmed that Cantó would remain as their representative for the following contest and, according the Eurovision rules, they would select a new song.

== Music video ==
The official video of "Universo", directed by Cristian Velasco, was filmed in Tenerife and Lanzarote in the Canary Islands, and was released on 30 January 2020.

== Track listing ==
Digital download
| No. | Title | Length |
|---|---|---|
| 1. | "Universo" | 3:02 |
