= Spain in the Eurovision Song Contest 2020 =

- Eurovision Song Contest 2020
- Participating broadcaster: Radiotelevisión Española (RTVE)
- Country: Spain
- Selection process: Internal selection
- Announcement date: Artist: 5 October 2019; Song: 30 January 2020

Competing entry
- Song: "Universo"
- Artist: Blas Cantó
- Songwriters: Blas Cantó; Dan Hammond; Dangelo Ortega; Mikołaj Trybulec; Ashley Hicklin

Placement
- Final result: Contest cancelled

Participation chronology

Spain was set to be represented at the Eurovision Song Contest 2020 with the song "Universo", written by Blas Cantó, Dan Hammond, Dangelo Ortega, Mikołaj Trybulec, and Ashley Hicklin, and performed by Blas Cantó himself. The Spanish participating broadcaster, Radiotelevisión Española (RTVE), internally selected its entry for the contest. RTVE announced Blas Cantó as its representative on 5 October 2019, while "Universo" was presented to the public on 30 January 2020.

As a member of the "Big Five", Spain automatically qualified to compete in the final of the Eurovision Song Contest. However, the contest was cancelled due to the COVID-19 pandemic.

== Background ==
Prior to the 2020 contest, Televisión Española (TVE) until 2006, and Radiotelevisión Española (RTVE) since 2007, had participated in the Eurovision Song Contest, representing Spain fifty-nine times since TVE's first entry in 1961. They have won the contest on two occasions: in 1968 with the song "La, la, la" performed by Massiel and in 1969 with the song "Vivo cantando" performed by Salomé, the latter having won in a four-way tie with France, the Netherlands, and the United Kingdom. They have also finished second four times, with "En un mundo nuevo" by Karina in 1971, "Eres tú" by Mocedades in 1973, "Su canción" by Betty Missiego in 1979, and "Vuelve conmigo" by Anabel Conde in 1995. In 2019, RTVE placed twenty-second with the song "La venda" performed by Miki.

As part of its duties as participating broadcaster, RTVE organises the selection of its entry in the Eurovision Song Contest and broadcasts the event in the country. RTVE confirmed its intentions to participate at the 2020 contest on 4 June 2019. In 2018 and 2019, RTVE organised a national final through the reality television music competition Operación Triunfo, which featured a competition among several artists and songs. For its 2020 entry, the broadcaster opted to select both the artist and song via an internal selection.

== Before Eurovision ==
=== Internal selection ===
On 5 October 2019, RTVE announced during La 1 news broadcast Telediario that it had internally selected singer Blas Cantó to represent Spain in Rotterdam. Cantó previously attempted to represent Spain in 2011 where he performed as part of Auryn, placing second in the national final with the song "Volver". Blas Cantó was selected as the Spanish entrant by a committee from six shortlisted candidates that were proposed by record labels, among them which also included Cristina Ramos, Diana Navarro, Lola Índigo and Ruth Lorenzo who represented Spain in 2014, as reported by Spanish media.

On 22 January 2020, RTVE revealed that Blas Cantó would sing the song "Universo", written by Blas Cantó himself together with Dan Hammond, Dangelo Ortega, Mikołaj Trybulec and Ashley Hicklin. The official video of the song, directed by Cristian Velasco and filmed in Lanzarote and Tenerife, premiered on 30 January 2020 on RTVE's website. In regards to the song, Blas Cantó stated: "Universo reflects a world similar to mine, with which the public can discover my evolution by listening to it. I think it is a roller coaster of emotions. Universo has a new and risky style for me but keep [sic] my essence".

=== Promotion ===
Blas Cantó's pre-contest promotion for "Universo" was focused in Spain, including a performance of the song on the fourth show of Operación Triunfo 2020 on 10 February.

== At Eurovision ==
The Eurovision Song Contest 2020 was expected to take place at Rotterdam Ahoy in Rotterdam, Netherlands, and would have consisted of two semi-finals on 12 and 14 May and the final on 16 May 2020. According to Eurovision rules, all nations with the exceptions of the host country and the "Big Five" (France, Germany, Italy, Spain and the United Kingdom) were required to qualify from one of two semi-finals in order to compete for the final; the top ten countries from each semi-final progress to the final. As a member of the "Big 5", Spain automatically qualified to compete in the final. In addition to their participation in the final, Spain was also required to broadcast and vote in one of the two semi-finals. However, due to the COVID-19 pandemic, the contest was cancelled.
