= SloMo (Chanel song) =

2022 song by Chanel

Single by Chanel

from the album ¡Agua!
- Language: Spanish; English
- Released: 24 December 2021
- Genre: Latin pop; reggaeton
- Length: 2:56
- Label: BMG Rights Management and Administration (Spain)
- Songwriters: Leroy Sanchez; Keith Harris; Ibere Fortes; Maggie Szabo; Arjen "SWACQ" Thonen
- Producers: Keith Harris; Guardians of the Frequencies

Chanel singles chronology
"SloMo" (2021)	"Toke" (2022)

Music video
- "SloMo" on YouTube

Eurovision Song Contest 2022 entry
- Country: Spain
- Artist: Chanel
- Languages: Spanish, English

Finals performance
- Final result: 3rd
- Final points: 459

Entry chronology
- ◄ "Voy a quedarme" (2021)
- "Eaea" (2023) ►

Official performance video
- "SloMo" (Second semi-final) on YouTube "SloMo" (Final) on YouTube

"SloMo" is the debut single by Cuban-Spanish singer Chanel Terrero, written and composed by Leroy Sanchez, Keith Harris, Ibere Fortes, Maggie Szabo, and Arjen "SWACQ" Thonen. After winning the first edition of the Benidorm Fest, the song represented Spain in the Eurovision Song Contest 2022 held in Turin, finishing in third place.

== Background ==
=== Conception ===
"SloMo" was written and composed by Leroy Sanchez, Keith Harris, Ibere Fortes, Maggie Szabo, and Arjen "SWACQ" Thonen. It was said that Thonen wrote the song with Jennifer Lopez in mind; however, Lopez never responded to his submission. It was later revealed that this was not true. Originally, the song was not going to be performed by Chanel Terrero, but by the singer Ana Guerra, but the latter rejected the proposal to perform it.

In a press conference, Chanel reported that the song spoke of "empowerment, to feel comfortable with your body, strong, big and stepping well, put on your crown and twerk to the ground. It is impossible not to get up from the chair."

=== Benidorm Fest 2022 ===
"SloMo" competed in the first edition of the Benidorm Fest, the song festival organised by Radiotelevisión Española (RTVE) to select its song and performer for the 66th edition of the Eurovision Song Contest. This national selection took place at the Palau Municipal d'Esports l'Illa de Benidorm in Benidorm. Thirteen artists and songs competed over three shows: two semi-finals on 26 and 27 January 2022 and the final on 29 January 2022. Each semi-final featured six or seven songs and four qualified for the final. The results of each show were determined through a combination of public voting, a demoscopic jury and an expert jury. The fourteen competing acts were announced on 10 December 2021, while the competing songs were premiered on 21 December 2021.

Chanel performed "SloMo" accompanied on stage by five dancers: Exon Arcos, Josh Huerta, Pol Soto, Raquel Caurín, and María Pérez. The stage director and choreographer of the performance was Kyle Hanagami.

"SloMo" won the first semi-final with 110 points, and subsequently won the final with 96 points becoming the Spanish entrant, and Chanel the performer, for Eurovision. In the semi-final, it received the most points from the expert and demoscopic juries, while in the final, it received the most points from the expert, and "Terra" by Tanxugueiras won the demoscopic and the televote. "SloMo" only got 3.97% of the televote, being in third place against "Ay mamá" by Rigoberta Bandini with 18.08% and "Terra" by Tanxugueiras with 70.75%.

Upon winning the Benidorm Fest, the authors were accused of plagiarizing Serbian singer Dara Bubamara's 2017 single "Extravagantno", written by Stefan Đurić and Slobodan Veljković, by Bubamara herself and Đurić.

=== Promotion ===
The music video for "SloMo" premiered on the official Eurovision YouTube channel on 15 March 2022. Chanel made appearances across Europe to promote "SloMo" as the Spanish Eurovision entry. She first guest performed at the second semi-final of the Festival da Canção 2022, which was held on 7 March 2022 at Studio 1 of Rádio e Televisão de Portugal in Lisbon. She then performed at Barcelona Eurovision Party, which was held on 26 March at Barcelona's Sala Apolo, and later performed at the London Eurovision Party, which was held on 3 April at London's Hard Rock Hotel venue. She also performed in the Eurovision in Concert at Amsterdam's AFAS Live on 9 April, and the PrePartyES which took place in Madrid's Sala La Riviera on 16 April.

=== Eurovision ===
The Eurovision Song Contest 2022 took place in Turin, Italy and consisted of two semi-finals on 10 and 12 May, and the grand final on 14 May 2022. According to Eurovision rules, all nations with the exceptions of the host country and the "Big Five" (France, Germany, Italy, Spain, and the United Kingdom) were required to qualify from one of two semi-finals in order to compete for the final; the top ten countries from each semi-final progressed to the final. As a member of the "Big Five", Spain automatically qualified to compete in the final on 14 May 2022.

In the final, Chanel performed "SloMo" tenth on the evening accompanied on stage by the same five dancers from Benidorm Fest and performing an improved version of the same choreography by Kyle Hanagami. She wore a black jumpsuit and jacket designed by Palomo Spain with over 50,000 crystals sewn on them. The song finished in 3rd place with 459 points and gave Spain its best ever result in number of points, receiving 12 points from eight different juries and giving Spain its best result since 1995.

=== Aftermath ===
The long-awaited success of Spain in Eurovision was greeted with enthusiasm across the country, with deputy prime ministers Nadia Calviño and Yolanda Díaz and opposition leader Alberto Núñez Feijóo among others congratulating Chanel for her performance and result. An average of 6.8 million viewers watched the final on La 1 of Televisión Española, with a peak of 8.853 million during the voting sequence. This equaled a 50.8% share of the market over the four hours of the final, an increase of 21.4 points from the previous edition. On 15 May, the day after the final, a reception event was organized at the Plaza Mayor in Madrid, where Chanel was greeted by a full crowd. On 17 May, she received a congratulation letter from King Felipe VI and Queen Letizia of Spain.

On 7 May 2024, Chanel performed "SloMo" with a different choreography as part of the Eurovision Song Contest 2024 first semi-final opening number. This same year's Spanish entrant postcard features a short clip of her Eurovision 2022 performance.

On 14 February 2026, Chanel performed "SloMo" alongside a medley of "Antillas", "Matahari", "Zakaza" and "Una Bala" as one of the performers in the final of the Benidorm Fest 2026.

== Track listing ==
- Digital download and streaming
1. "SloMo" – 2:56
- Digital download and streaming – Eurovision's Dancebreak Edit
1. "SloMo" (Eurovision's Dancebreak Edit) – 3:00
- 7-inch single
1. A1. "SloMo"
2. A2. "SloMo" (Acoustic Version)
3. B1. "SloMo" (Eurovision's Dancebreak Edit)
4. B2. "SloMo" (Karaoke Edit)

== Chart performance ==
=== Weekly charts ===
Chart (2022)	Peak position
Croatia (Billboard)	24
Germany Download (Official German Charts)	32
Global 200 (Billboard)	151
Greece International (IFPI Greece)	3
Greece International (IFPI Greece) Eurovision's Dancebreak Edit	36
Iceland (Tónlistinn)	11
Ireland (IRMA)	44
Lithuania (AGATA)	8
Lithuania (AGATA) Eurovision's Dancebreak Edit	65
Netherlands (Single Top 100)	72
Portugal (AFP)	88
Spain (PROMUSICAE)	1
Spain Airplay (PROMUSICAE)	2
Sweden (Sverigetopplistan)	32
Switzerland (Schweizer Hitparade)	65
UK Singles (Official Charts)	56

=== Year-end charts ===
Chart (2022)	Position
Spain (PROMUSICAE)	27
Spain Airplay (PROMUSICAE)	15

=== Certifications ===
Region	Certification	Certified units/sales
Spain (Promusicae)	4× Platinum	240,000^{‡}
^{‡} Sales+streaming figures based on certification alone.
