= Benidorm Fest =

Spanish song contest (2022–)

- Genre: Pop, Latin pop, rock, R&B, etc.
- Created by: Radiotelevisión Española (RTVE); Generalitat Valenciana
- Based on: Benidorm Song Festival
- Presented by: Jesús Vázquez (2026–); Javier Ambrossi (2026–); Inés Hernand (2022–2023, 2025–); Lalachus (2026–); Paula Vázquez (2025); Ruth Lorenzo (2024–2025); Marc Calderó (2024); Ana Prada (2024); Mónica Naranjo (2023); Rodrigo Vázquez (2023); Màxim Huerta (2022); Alaska (2022)
- Theme music composer: Pepe Herrero
- Opening theme: "Vita est"
- Country of origin: Spain
- Original language: Spanish
- No. of seasons: 5
- No. of episodes: 15

Production
- Production locations: Palau Municipal d'Esports l'Illa de Benidorm; Benidorm, Valencian Community
- Production companies: RTVE (2022–); Sould Out (2026–); Boomerang TV (2022–2025)

Original release
- Network: La 1
- Release: 26 January 2022 – present

Related
- Eurovision Song Contest

Benidorm Fest (Note: Pronunciation of Benidorm Fest: Valencian: [beniˈðɔɾm ˈfest] Spanish: [beniˈðoɾ ˈfest]) is an annual Spanish song contest organised by the Spanish public broadcaster Radiotelevisión Española (RTVE), in collaboration with the Generalitat Valenciana. Beginning in 2022, it is held in Benidorm, Valencian Community, at the Palau Municipal d'Esports l'Illa de Benidorm. Inspired by the Benidorm Song Festival, the contest consists of two semi-finals and a final, with the winner jointly determined through teams of judges and a public vote. From 2022 to 2025, it served to select Spain's entry for the Eurovision Song Contest.

== History ==
=== Background ===
The event is loosely based on the Benidorm Song Festival, an international song contest created in 1958 and modelled on the Italian Sanremo Music Festival. The competition was held intermittently until 2006, interspersed with several hiatuses and various changes to the format.

=== Return of a competition to Benidorm ===
Fifteen years after the final edition of the Benidorm Song Festival, Radiotelevisión Española (RTVE) broadcast a conference from the city on 22 July 2021, in which the president of the Generalitat Valenciana Ximo Puig, mayor of the city Antonio Pérez, and president of the broadcaster José Manuel Pérez Tornero announced the revival of a song competition held in Benidorm, which would also become a new Spanish pre-selection for the Eurovision Song Contest, starting with the 2022 edition. During the broadcast, viewers were assured that there would be changes and updates to the contest's format, as well as a "double contest" in which both famous and upcoming singers would take part, whose prize would be the chance to represent Spain at Eurovision.

On 29 September of the same year, the rules and mechanics were published, revealing the name of the revamped competition to be "Benidorm Fest" and that the first edition was scheduled to air at the end of January 2022. It was subsequently announced that a contract had been signed to hold the event for four editions. The Generalitat Valenciana invested around €968,000 in the event.

Following the 2024 edition of the competition, representatives of Benidorm's municipal council (including mayor Toni Pérez), the Department of Innovation, Industry, Commerce and Tourism of the Generalitat Valenciana, and RTVE travelled to the 74th Sanremo Music Festival, which also served as the Italian national final for Eurovision; municipal councillor Jesús Carrobles revealed that the aim was to start a collaboration between the two events. The format was thereby confirmed for 2025.

In response to criticism for the low televoting figures in 2024, attributed to the relatively high costs of telephone calls and SMS messages, RTVE managers stated the goal to make the public voting free by means of a mobile app from 2025.

In 2026, RTVE decided not to participate in that year's Eurovision Song Contest due to the inclusion of Israel amidst the Gaza war, though it continued to organise Benidorm Fest independently of the European contest. Thus, whether or not Spain is represented in subsequent Eurovision editions, the Benidorm-based contest would continue to function as a platform for promoting the Spanish music industry. Among the novelties introduced that year were a cash prize awarded to the performers and composers of the winning song, as well as other additional recognitions open to all participants. These included a prize sponsored by Spotify, which allowed one of the artists to record a Spotify Single in Stockholm, and an international promotion initiative that offered another participant the opportunity to travel to the United States to promote their musical project and record a single with a well-known producer under an agreement with TelevisaUnivision. These latter prizes were not necessarily linked to the winner of the competition.

== Format ==
The contest consists of two semi-finals and a final, in which a number of candidates – soloists, duos, trios or groups – perform their songs live. In the first edition there were seven entries for each semi-final and eight in the final; for the second edition there were nine songs in each semi-final (for a total number of eighteen entries) and eight in the final. The third and fourth edition featured a reduced number of sixteen entries, eight in each semi-final and final. Since the fifth edition, there are eighteen entries, nine in each semi-final and twelve in the final.

The public (consisting of the televote plus a panel of judges made up of a sample of the Spanish population selected by statistical and demoscopic criteria) and a national and international jury vote for their preferred songs, with the final result determined by a split vote between the public and the juries. At the end of the programme, the song with the most points is declared the winner.

=== Voting ===
Voting during the three shows occurs through a combination of the following methods:

- Expert jury (50%) – heads of delegation, artists, musicians and/or other professionals, involving both national and international members.
- Demoscopic panel (25%) – composed of a statistically-selected sample of the Spanish population.
- Public voting (25%) – via telephone and SMS.

=== Presenters ===
Year	Presenter(s)	Ref(s)
2022	Alaska, Inés Hernand and Màxim Huerta	
2023	Mónica Naranjo, Inés Hernand and Rodrigo Vázquez	
2024	Ruth Lorenzo, Marc Calderó and Ana Prada	
2025	Paula Vázquez, Ruth Lorenzo and Inés Hernand	
2026	Jesús Vazquez, Javier Ambrossi, Inés Hernand and Lalachus	

==== Recurring presenters ====
Presenter		Year				
Presenter		2022	2023	2024	2025	2026
Inés Hernand	4	●	●		●	●
Ruth Lorenzo	2			●	●	

=== Visual design and participants ===
Year	Logo	Participants	Finalists
2022		13 (Note: Before Luna Ki withdrew there were originally 14 participating artists in 2022.)	8
2023		18	8
2024		16	8
2025		16	8
2026		18	12

== Identity ==
=== Theme music ===
The theme music of Benidorm Fest, entitled "Vita est", was composed by the musician Pepe Herrero and it is performed by the RTVE Orchestra and Choir. It is a symphonic piece inspired by classic themes such as "O Fortuna" from Carmina Burana by Carl Orff, combining it with modern compositions by composers such as Hans Zimmer. The lyrics, composed in Latin, highlight the value of music as a means to unite peoples and make them free.

The author produced 15 variations of the piece, of different durations and instrumental templates, for different purposes.

=== Trophy ===
From 2022 to 2025, the winner of Benidorm Fest received a Bronze Microphone, made by Madrid sculptor José Luis Fernández. It is a 30 centimeters tall piece, cast in bronze and made with lost-wax casting method. Beginning with the 2026 edition, the Golden Mermaid trophy from the Benidorm Song Festival is reused.

== Selection of participants ==
RTVE opens a period of submissions for artists, authors and composers to send their proposals to the public radio and television corporation, while the broadcaster itself reserves the right to invite renowned singers and authors from the current music scene directly. Both the evaluation of submissions and the invitations are carried out in collaboration with external musical advisers. The contest is open to performers, groups and authors who are at least 16 years old before May of the current year, and who must be Spanish nationals or have permanent residence in Spain (in the case of duos or groups, at least 50% of the members must meet this condition).

Songs must be original and not have been published, performed or distributed, in whole or in part, before September of the previous year to the Eurovision Song Contest (in accordance with Eurovision rules). In addition, the song must be between 2 and a half and 3 minutes long, and must include at least 60% of the lyrics in Spanish and/or co-official languages of Spain.

=== Recurring artists ===
Artist(s)	Year	Song	Place
Blanca Paloma	2022	"Secreto de agua"	5^{th} place
Blanca Paloma	2023	"Eaea"	1^{st} place
Luna Ki	2022	"Voy a morir"	Withdrew
Luna Ki	2026	"Bomba de amor"	Failed to qualify (Note: Placed 7th in Semi-Final 1.)
Vicco	2023	"Nochentera"	3^{rd} place
Vicco	2027	"TBA"	TBA

== Winners ==
Year	Song	Genre	Artist	Songwriter(s)
2022	"SloMo"	Latin pop, reggaeton	Chanel	Leroy Sanchez; Keith Harris; Ibere Maravilha Fortes; Maggie Szabo; Arjen Thonen
2023	"Eaea"	New flamenco	Blanca Paloma	Álvaro Tato; Blanca Paloma Ramos; José Pablo Polo
2024	"Zorra"	Synth-pop	Nebulossa	María Bas; Mark Dasousa
2025	"Esa diva"	Latin pop	Melody	Alberto Fuentes Lorite; Melodía Ruiz Gutiérrez
2026	"T amaré"	Electronic	Tony Grox and LUCYCALYS	Antonio Ramírez Bernal; Carlos Prieto Cornejo

=== Gallery ===
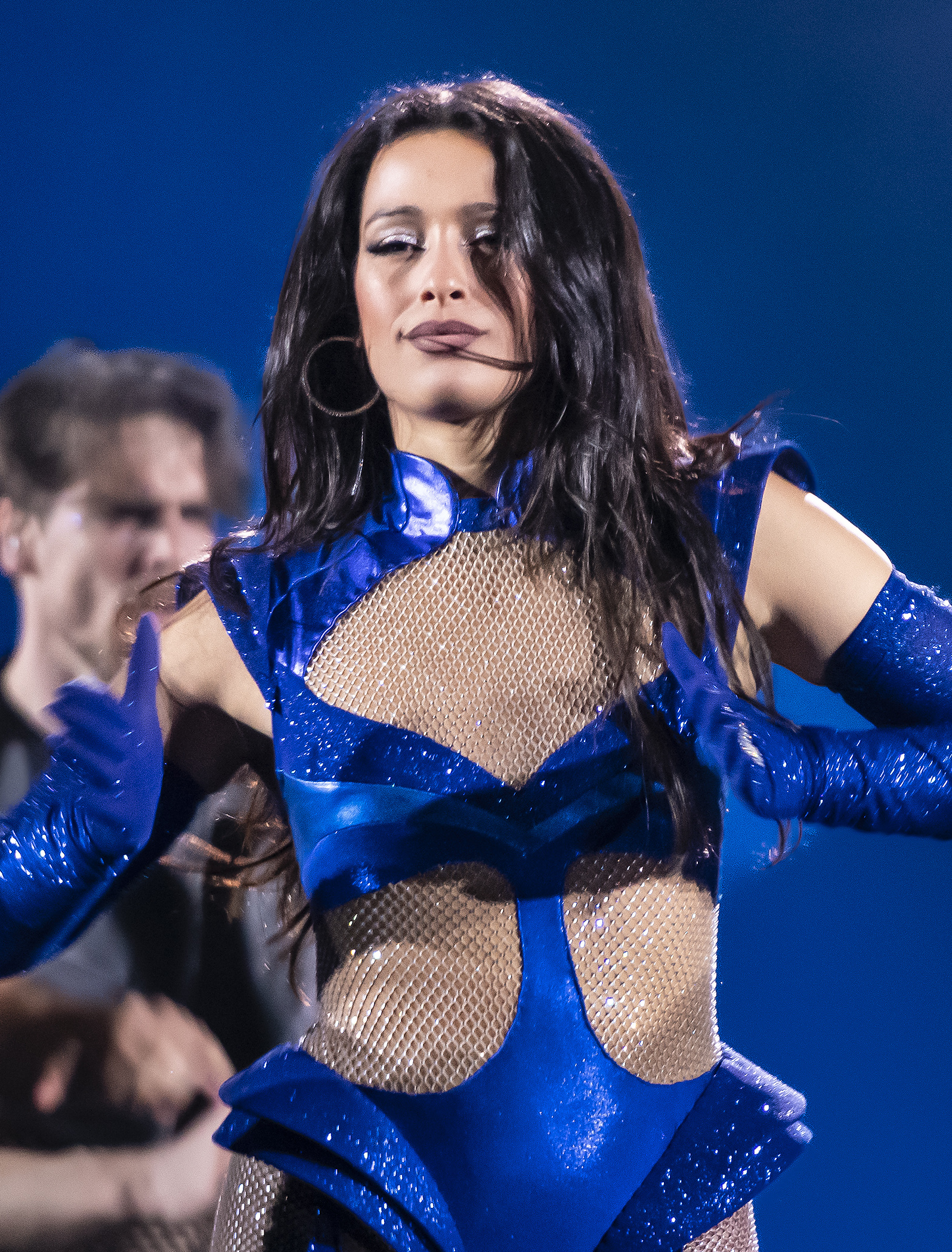
Chanel

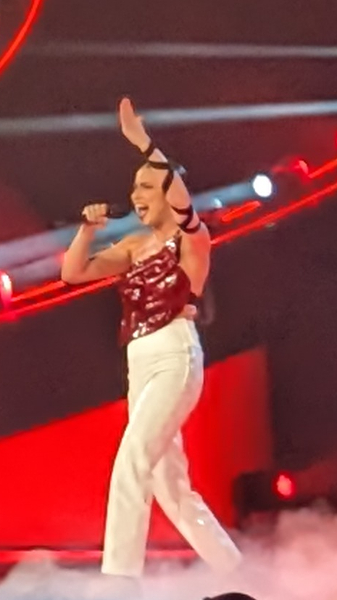
Blanca Paloma

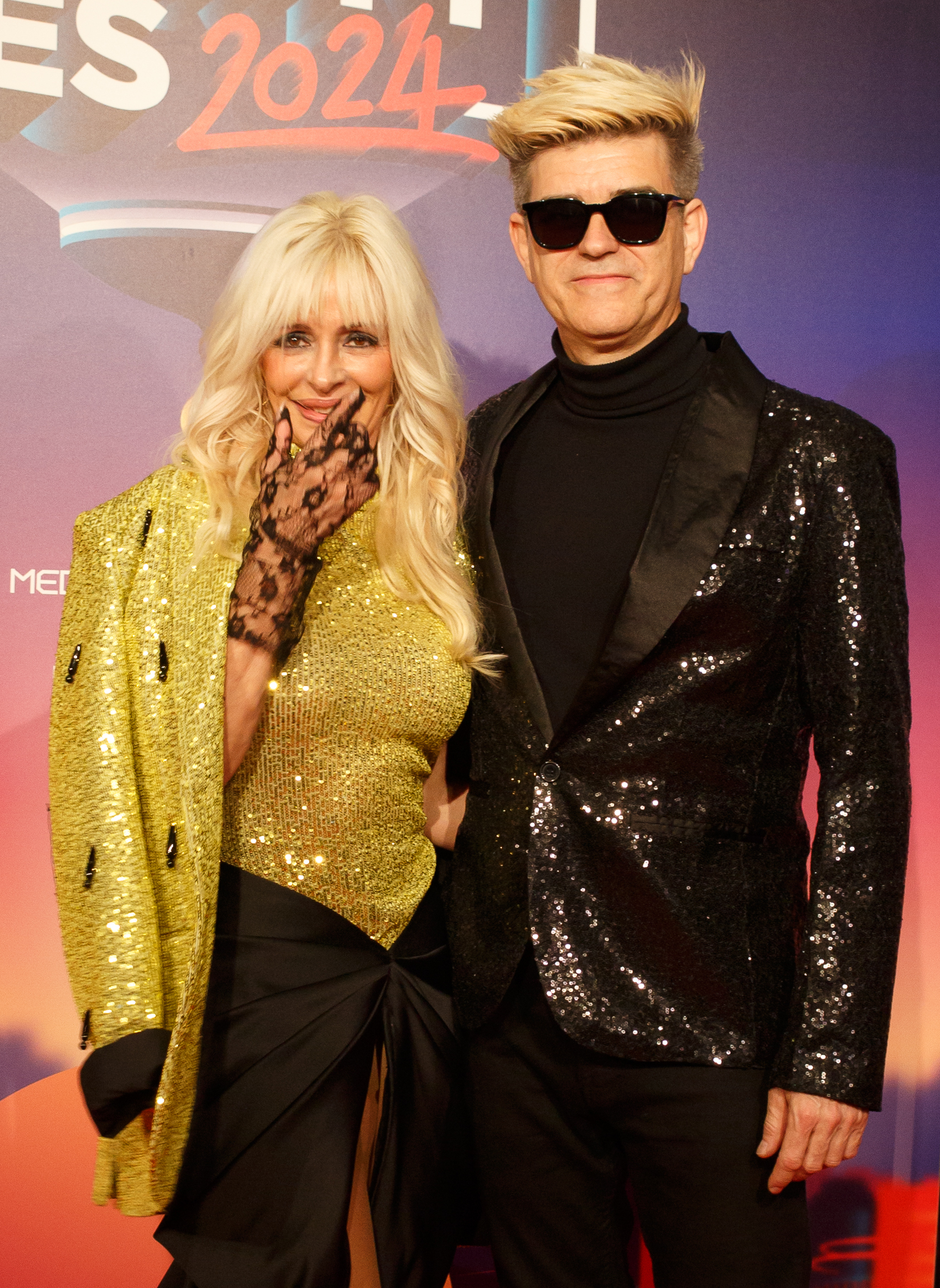
Nebulossa

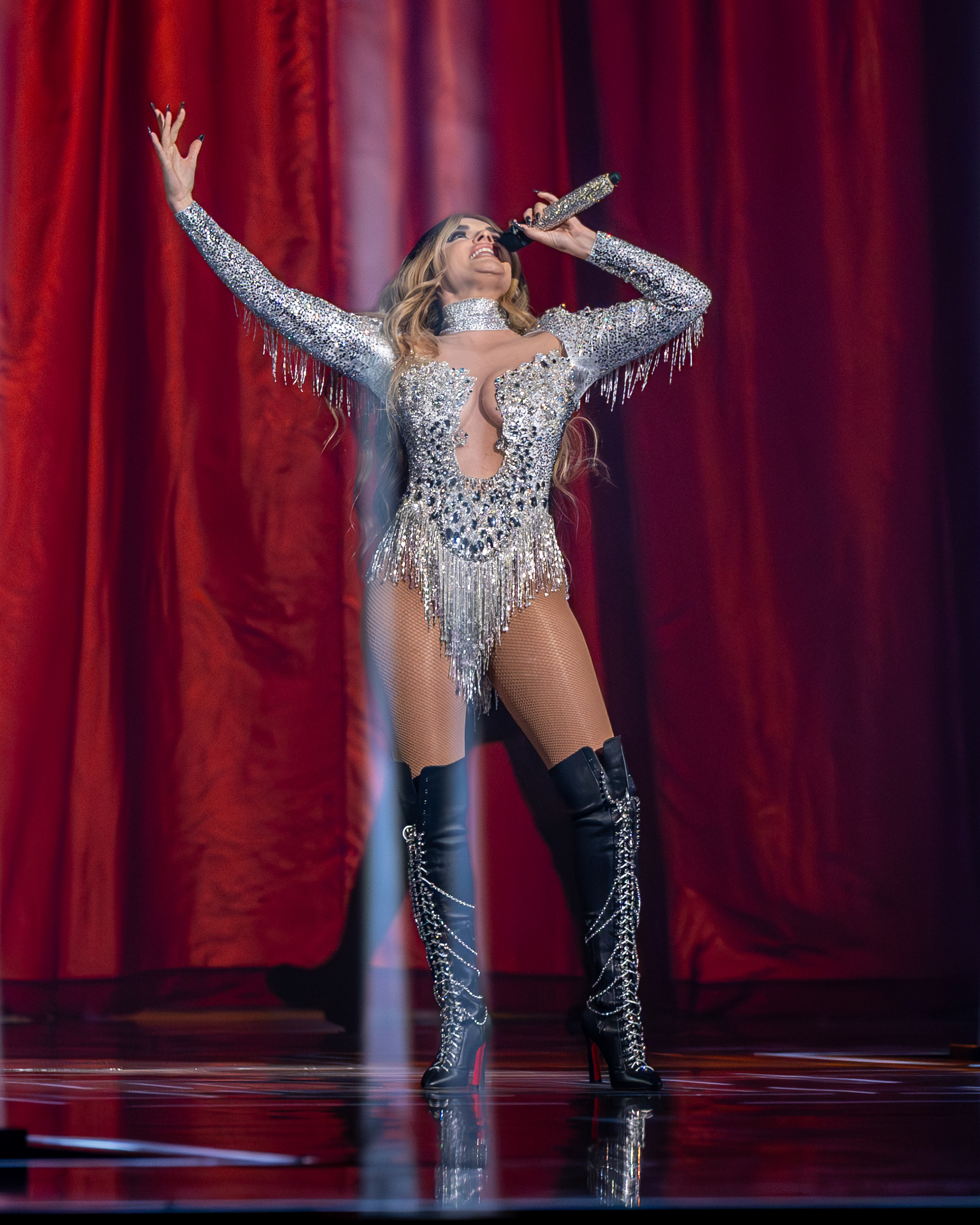
Melody

=== Finalists ===
Finalists
#	2022		2023		2024		2025		2026	
1	"SloMo"; Chanel	96	"Eaea"; Blanca Paloma	169	"Zorra"; Nebulossa	156	"Esa diva" Melody	150	"T amare" Tony Grox; Lucycalys	166
2	"Ay mama" Rigoberta Bandini	91	"Quiero arder" Agoney	145	"Dos extraños (Cuarteto de cuerda)" St. Pedro	139	"Uh nana" Daniela Blasco	141	"Turista" ASHA	144
3	"Terra" Tanxugeiras	90	"Nochentera" Vicco	129	"Sé quién soy" Angy Fernández	128	"VIP" J Kbello	131	"Mataora" Rosalinda Galán	140
4	"Calle de la llorería" Rayden	67	"Arcadia" Megara	106	"Caliente" Jorge González	124	"I'm a Queen" Mel Ömana	117	"¿Qué vas a hacer?" Izan Llunas	139
5	"Secreto De Agua" Blanca Paloma	61	"Yo quisiera" Alice Wonder	89	"Brillos platino" Almácor	99	"Hartita de llorar" Lachispa	98	"Despierto amándote" Miranda! and Bailamamá	118
6	"Raffaella" Varry Brava	55	"Quiero y duelo" Karamento	80	"Remitente" María Peláe	86	"Loca xti" Kuve	96	"El Amor Te Da Miedo" Kitai	103
7	"Eco" Xeinn	45	"Inviernos en Marte" José Otero	75	"Here To Stay" Sofia Coll	73	"Te escribo en el cielo" Lucas Bun	70	"Tú no me quieres" The Quinquis	93
8	"Quién lo diría" Gonzalo Hermida	35	"Mi familia" Fusa Nocta	71	"Bla bla bla" Miss Caffeina	59	"Raggio di sole" Mawot	58	"Las damas y el vagabundo" María León feat. Julia Medina	82
9	–								"Bailándote" Dani J	80
10	–								"Mi Mitad" Mikel Herzog Jr.	79
11	–								"Tócame" Mayo	64
12	–								"Los ojos no mienten" Kenneth	40

== Ratings ==
Viewers in millions
	Semi-final 1		Semi-final 2		Final	
Year	Viewers	Share (%)	Viewers	Share (%)	Viewers	Share (%)
2022	1.534	11.8%	1.728	14.2%	2.966	21.0%
2023	1.044	10.0%	1.020	09.4%	1.887	14.7%
2024	1.005	10.8%	1.039	10.5%	1.977	16.6%
2025	1.215	13.1%	1.030	11.7%	1.938	17.1%
2026	0.850	11.1%	0.857	11.1%	1.085	12.1%
