= Benidorm Fest 2022 =

Spanish selection for the Eurovision Song Contest 2022

Dates and venue
- Semi-final 1: 26 January 2022
- Semi-final 2: 27 January 2022
- Final: 29 January 2022
- Venue: Palau Municipal d'Esports l'Illa de Benidorm (Benidorm, Valencian Community, Spain)

Organisation
- Broadcaster: Radiotelevisión Española (RTVE)
- Executive supervisors: María Eizaguirre; Eva Mora
- Presenters: Alaska; Inés Hernand; Màxim Huerta

Participants
- Number of entries: 14

Vote
- Winning song: "SloMo" by Chanel

Benidorm Fest 2022 was the first edition of the annual Benidorm Fest, a television song contest held in the homonymous city, organised and broadcast by Radiotelevisión Española (RTVE). Presented by Alaska, Inés Hernand and Màxim Huerta, the competition was held between 26 and 29 January 2022.

"SloMo", written by Leroy Sanchez, Keith Harris, Ibere Fortes, Maggie Szabo and Arjen Thonen, and performed by Chanel, won the inaugural edition of Benidorm Fest, and thus represented Spain at the Eurovision Song Contest 2022 in Turin, Italy, where it placed third, marking the best performance for Spain in Eurovision since 1995.

The first edition of Benidorm Fest was met with a positive reception for its realization and production, bet on independent artists, and for rejuvenating Eurovision national selections in the country. Almost three million viewers watched the final, making up a 21% share of the television market. Five out of fourteen entries entered the PROMUSICAE chart, two of them reaching the top spot. The debut of Benidorm Fest helped launch the musical careers of Chanel, Rigoberta Bandini, and Tanxugueiras.

== Format ==
The competition consisted of two semi-finals and one final. In total, 14 candidate songs compete divided between the two semifinals, that is, seven participate in each one. In each semifinal, the four songs with the most votes among the national (30%) and international (20%) professional juries, the demographic panel (25%) and the televote (25%), went directly to the final. During the final, the eight classified songs were performed again to determine which would represent Spain in the Eurovision Song Contest 2022, following the same voting system as in the previous galas.

=== Presenters ===
Presenter	Occupation(s)
Alaska	Singer and songwriter
Inés Hernand	Internet personality and comedian
Màxim Huerta	TV presenter, journalist and writer

=== Expert jury members ===
Member	Occupation(s)
Estefanía García	Coordinator of the RTVE Chorus and Orchestra
Felix Bergsson	Head of the Icelandic delegation at Eurovision
Marvin Dietmann	Scenographer
Miryam Benedited	Choreographer
Natalia Calderón	Singer, actress and vocal coach

=== Guest performers ===
Alongside the song competition, the live shows included performances by national and international guest artists.

In the first semi-final, Salvador Sobral, winner of the Eurovision Song Contest 2017, performed "Fui ver meu amor" and Marlon performed "De perreo" as interval acts. During the interval of the second semi-final, Ruth Lorenzo, who represented Spain in the Eurovision Song Contest 2014, performed Sergio Dalma's "Bailar pegados" (the Spanish entry at the Eurovision Song Contest 1991) and Niña Polaca performed "Nora".

The final was opened by Pastora Soler, who represented Spain in the Eurovision Song Contest 2012, performing her entry "Quédate conmigo". The interval of the final featured Nía and Nyno Vargas performing "Me muero de risa", and Soler reappearing to perform "Que hablen de mí". In addition, 2020 and 2021 Spanish Eurovision entrant Blas Cantó made an appearance to hand the trophy to the winner.

== Competing entries ==
On 29 September 2021, RTVE opened a one-month period (later extended until 10 November) for artists, authors and composers to send their proposals to the public radio and television corporation, while the broadcaster itself reserved a direct invitation to renowned singers and authors from the current music scene. Both the evaluation of submissions and the invitations were carried out in collaboration with musical advisers J Cruz, Tony Sánchez-Ohlsson and Zahara. At a press conference held on 22 November 2021 Spanish head of delegation Eva Mora declared 692 submissions had been received by the online form, and 194 songs had been submitted by artists directly invited by RTVE, for a total of 886.

The names of the initial 14 artists and songs were announced on 10 December 2021. All the songs were made available on RTVE Play and RTVE's website on 21 December 2021. On 23 January 2022, Luna Ki announced their withdrawal from Benidorm Fest due to a combination of personal issues and the inability to use autotune under Eurovision rules.

Selected entries and their scores in the selection procedure
Artist	Song	Composer(s)	Points	Place
Azúcar Moreno	"Postureo"	Miguel Linde, Alberto Lorite, David Parejo	119	9
Blanca Paloma	"Secreto de agua"	Blanca Paloma, Antón Serrats, Tomás Virgós, Pablo Serrano	153	7
Chanel	"SloMo"	Leroy Sanchez, Keith Harris, Ibere Fortes, Maggie Szabo, Arjen Thonen	193	2
Gonzalo Hermida	"Quién lo diría"	Gonzalo Hermida, David Santisteban	143	8
Javiera Mena	"Culpa"	Javiera Mena	103	12
~~Luna Ki~~	~~"Voy a morir"~~	~~Luna Ki, Miguel García, Vanity Vercetti, Alejandro Fierro~~	~~109~~	~~11~~
Marta Sango	"Sigues en mi mente"	Marta Sango, Marco Frías, Mané López	82	13
Rayden	"Calle de la llorería"	David Martínez Álvarez, François Le Goffic	161	5
Rigoberta Bandini	"Ay mamá"	Paula Ribó González, Esteban Navarro Dordal, Stefano Maccarrone	287	1
Sara Deop	"Make You Say"	Leroy Sanchez, Camille Purcell, Linus Nordstrom, Frank Nobel	157	6
Tanxugueiras	"Terra"	Olaia Maneiro Argibay, Sabela Maneiro Argibay, Aida Tarrío Torrado, Iago Pico Freire	118	10
Unique	"Mejores"	Marco Dettoni, Manu Chalud, Armando Valenzuela, Carlos Almazán, Javier López, Raúl Madroñal	71	14
Varry Brava	"Raffaella"	Óscar Ferrer, Aaron Sáez, Vicente Illescas	189	3
Xeinn	"Eco"	Carlos Marco, Jimmy Jansson, Marcus Winther-John, Thomas G:son	181	4

== Semi-finals ==
The two semi-finals were held on 26 and 27 January 2022. The running order of the semi-finals, which was decided by the organizers, was revealed on 13 January 2022.

=== Semi-final 1 ===
The first semi-final was held on 26 January 2022. Chanel, Tanxugueiras, Blanca Paloma and Varry Brava qualified for the final.

Semi-final 1 – 26 January 2022
R/O	Artist	Song	Expert jury	Demoscopic jury	Televote	Total	Place
1	~~Luna Ki~~	~~"Voy a morir"~~	Withdrew				
2	Varry Brava	"Raffaella"	39	15	20	74	4
3	Azúcar Moreno	"Postureo"	39	18	12	69	5
4	Blanca Paloma	"Secreto de agua"	41	20	18	79	3
5	Unique	"Mejores"	28	12	15	55	6
6	Tanxugueiras	"Terra"	38	25	30	93	2
7	Chanel	"SloMo"	55	30	25	110	1

=== Semi-final 2 ===
The second semi-final was held on 27 January 2022. Rigoberta Bandini, Rayden, Xeinn and Gonzalo Hermida qualified for the final.

Semi-final 2 – 27 January 2022
R/O	Artist	Song	Expert jury	Demoscopic jury	Televote	Total	Place
1	Xeinn	"Eco"	46	15	20	81	3
2	Marta Sango	"Sigues en mi mente"	36	12	15	63	5
3	Javiera Mena	"Culpa"	28	10	12	50	6
4	Gonzalo Hermida (Note: Following a positive COVID-19 test result, in accordance with the event's protocols, Hermida competed using the music video of the song.)	"Quién lo diría"	28	30	18	76	4
5	Rigoberta Bandini	"Ay mamá"	56	25	30	111	1
6	Rayden	"Calle de la llorería"	45	20	25	90	2
7	Sara Deop	"Make You Say"	21	18	10	49	7

== Final ==
The final was held on 29 January 2022. The running order of the final was decided by a draw held on 28 January 2022.

R/O	Artist	Song	Expert jury	Demoscopic jury		Televote		Total	Place
R/O	Artist	Song	Expert jury	Percentage	Points	Percentage	Points	Total	Place
1	Rayden	"Calle de la llorería"	37	12.17%	15	2.12%	15	67	4
2	Tanxugueiras	"Terra"	30	14.59%	30	70.75%	30	90	3
3	Varry Brava	"Raffaella"	25	11.39%	12	2.26%	18	55	6
4	Chanel	"SloMo"	51	13.88%	25	3.97%	20	96	1
5	Rigoberta Bandini	"Ay mamá"	46	13.52%	20	18.08%	25	91	2
6	Xeinn	"Eco"	30	10.92%	5	1.01%	10	45	7
7	Gonzalo Hermida	"Quién lo diría"	12	12.62%	18	0.76%	5	35	8
8	Blanca Paloma	"Secreto de agua"	39	10.92%	10	1.04%	12	61	5

Detailed expert jury votes
R/O	Song	Juror 1	Juror 2	Juror 3	Juror 4	Juror 5	Total
1	"Calle de la llorería"	8	10	7	6	6	37
2	"Terra"	10	7	4	7	2	30
3	"Raffaella"	6	5	5	4	5	25
4	"SloMo"	7	12	12	8	12	51
5	"Ay mamá"	12	8	6	10	10	46
6	"Eco"	4	4	10	5	7	30
7	"Quién lo diría"	2	2	2	2	4	12
8	"Secreto de agua"	5	6	8	12	8	39

== Ratings ==
Viewing figures by show
Show	Air date	Viewers (millions)	Share (%)
Semi-final 1	26 January 2022	1.534	11.8%
Semi-final 2	27 January 2022	1.728	14.2%
Final	29 January 2022	2.966	21.0%

== Controversy ==
Following Benidorm Fest, allegations of favouritism, also known as "tongo", arose regarding Chanel's victory. One of the members of the national jury, Miryam Benedited, had previously worked with Chanel as a choreographer, leading to allegations of cronyism, as Chanel received the maximum number of points from the jury. Furthermore, Spanish viewers expressed frustration with the voting format, when it was revealed that Tanxugueiras, who finished in third place, had won the public vote with 70.75%, while winner Chanel only received 3.97%. Public votes were only worth 25% of the total score, while the professional jury votes were worth 50%. RTVE released a statement acknowledging the viewers' dissatisfaction with the selection, and promised to open a dialogue to improve future editions of Benidorm Fest, but maintained that they would support Chanel as the Spanish representative. Both Rigoberta Bandini and Tanxugueiras, who came in second and third place, expressed their support to Chanel, and called for fans to accept the results.
