= Ptazeta =

Spanish rapper

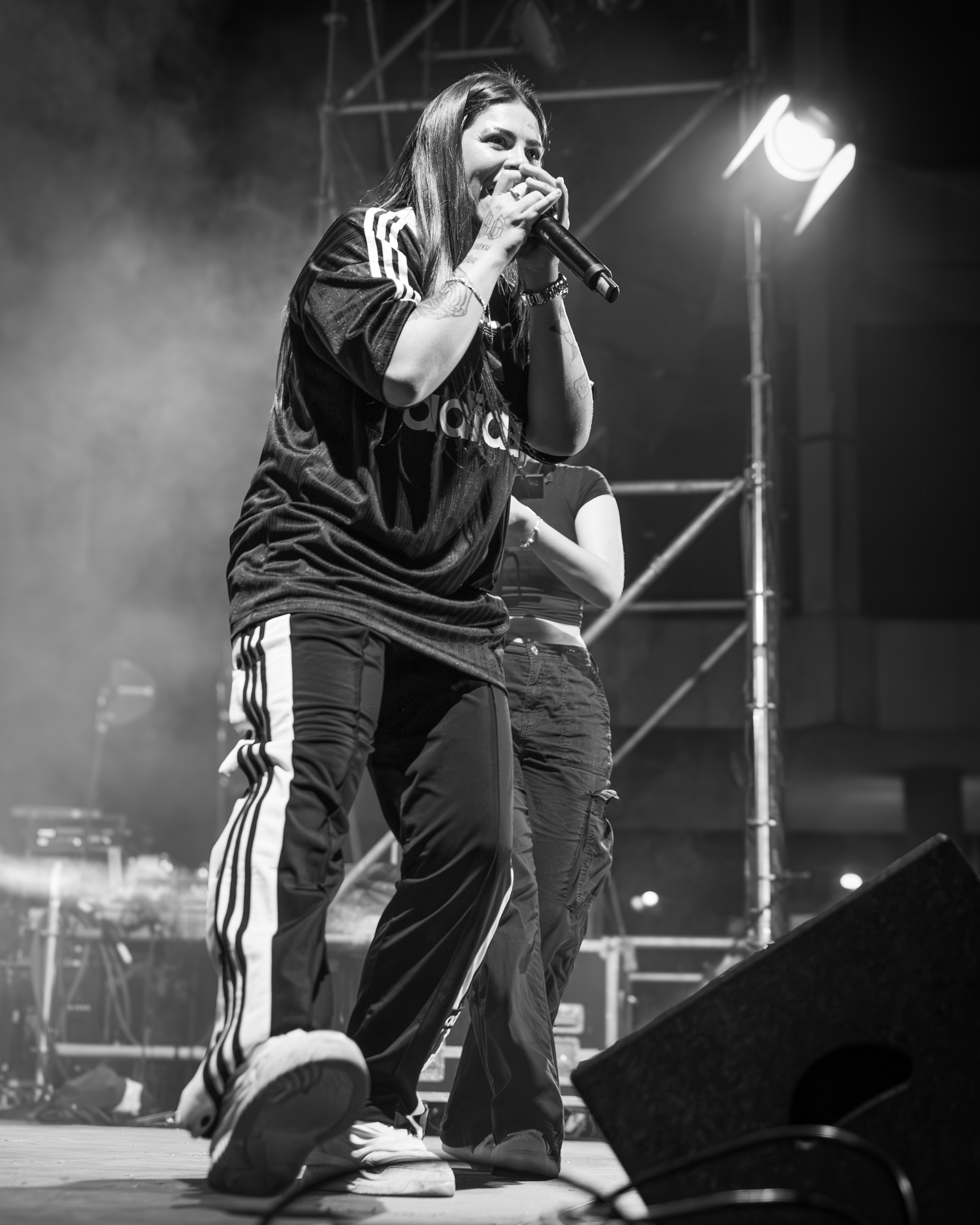
- Ptazeta rapping in 2024.

Background information
- Born: Zuleima del Pino González González; 10 August 1998 (age 28); Arucas, Canarias, Spain
- Genre: Latin trap
- Occupations: Rapper; songwriter
- Instrument: Vocals
- Years active: 2019–present
- Label: Interscope Records

Zuleima del Pino González González (born 10 October 1998), known professionally as Ptazeta, is a Spanish rapper and singer.

== Biography ==
Zuleima del Pino González González was born on 10 October 1998 in Arucas, a town in the northern part of the island of Gran Canaria.

Ptazeta released her debut single in 2019, "Mami", in collaboration with Spanish producer Juacko. She rose to worldwide prominence in October 2021, when she collaborated on the track "Ptazeta: Bzrp Music Sessions, Vol. 45" with Argentinian producer Bizarrap, which charted at #23 on Argentina Hot 100. She released her debut studio album "The Party En La Casa" on February 28 2022.

In May 2022, she signed a record deal with Interscope Records, and released her second studio album "GORGONA" on June 20 2024 under the label. After that, she decided to embark on a hiatus.

She returned to music in March 12 2026, when she independently released the EP "Amor".

== Personal life ==
Ptazeta is a lesbian and incorporates queer lyrics in her works.

== Discography ==
=== Studio albums ===
List of studio albums, with selected details and chart positions
Title	Studio album details	Peaks
Title	Studio album details	SPA
The Party en la Casa	Released: 18 February 2022; Label: Real Key; Formats: Digital download, streaming	98

=== EPs ===
- After Party en la Casa (2022)

=== Singles ===
List of singles as lead artist, showing selected chart positions, certifications, and associated albums
Title	Year	Peak chart positions				Certifications	Album
Title	Year	SPA	ARG	PAR	URU	Certifications	Album
"Mami"	2020	5	—	—	—	PROMUSICAE: 2× Platinum	Non-album singles
"Todo Bien"	2020	—	—	—	—		Non-album singles
"Mensaje Enviado"	2020	—	—	—	—		Non-album singles
"Dejate Ser"	2020	—	—	—	—		Non-album singles
"Be Yourself"	2020	—	—	—	—		Non-album singles
"Ayer La Vi"	2020	—	—	—	—		Non-album singles
"Lo Que Vivo"	2020	—	—	—	—		Non-album singles
"Mi Huella"	2020	—	—	—	—		Non-album singles
"Nena No Me Llores"	2020	—	—	—	—		Non-album singles
"Trakatá" (with Farina)	2021	67	—	—	—	PROMUSICAE: Platinum	Non-album singles
"Madre Mía" (with Tatiana Delalvz and Lérica)	2021	—	—	—	—		Non-album singles
"Cha Cha" (with Foyone)	2021	—	—	—	—		Non-album singles
"Me Llama"	2021	—	—	—	—		Non-album singles
"Estoy Bien"	2021	—	—	—	—		Non-album singles
"Niveles"	2021	—	—	—	—		Non-album singles
"Ri Ri"	2021	—	—	—	—		Non-album singles
"Ptazeta: Bzrp Music Sessions, Vol. 45" (with Bizarrap)	2021	11	21	100	—	PROMUSICAE: 2× Platinum	Non-album singles
"Ella" (with El Bobe and Camin featuring AlPeDue)	2021	—	—	—	—	PROMUSICAE: Gold	Non-album singles
"Home"	2021	—	—	—	—		The Party en la Casa
"Cae La Noche"	2021	—	—	—	—		The Party en la Casa
"Tilín"	2022	—	—	—	—		The Party en la Casa
"Input"	2022	—	—	—	—		The Party en la Casa
"Quieres" (with Aitana and Emilia)	2022	20	75	—	9	PROMUSICAE: Platinum	Non-album singles
"Mujerón" (with Villano Antillano)	2022	—	—	—	—		Non-album singles
"Ponte Pal XXX"	2022	—	—	—	—		Non-album singles
"Number One" (with Chema Rivas)	2022	—	—	—	—		Non-album singles
"Desacatá" (with L-Gante)	2022	—	—	—	—		Non-album singles
"Mala Mala"	2022	—	—	—	—		Non-album singles
"MFD"	2023	—	—	—	—		Non-album singles
"Tiki Tiki" (with Lola Índigo)	2023	100	—	—	—	PROMUSICAE: Gold	Non-album singles
"La Respuesta" (with Lit Killah)	2023	—	—	—	—		Non-album singles
"Ping Pong" (with Chanel)	2023	90	—	—	—		¡Agua!
"Relajao"	2023	—	—	—	—		Non-album singles
"No Me Jalan"	2023	—	—	—	—		Non-album singles
"Toto"	2023	—	—	—	—		Non-album singles
"A Oscuras" (with Lali)	2024	—	—	—	—		TBA
"—" denotes a recording that did not chart or was not released in that territory.
