= Julia Medina =

Julia Medina may refer to:

- Julia Medina (One Life to Live)
- Julia Medina (singer)
