= Benidorm Fest 2026 =

Spanish song contest

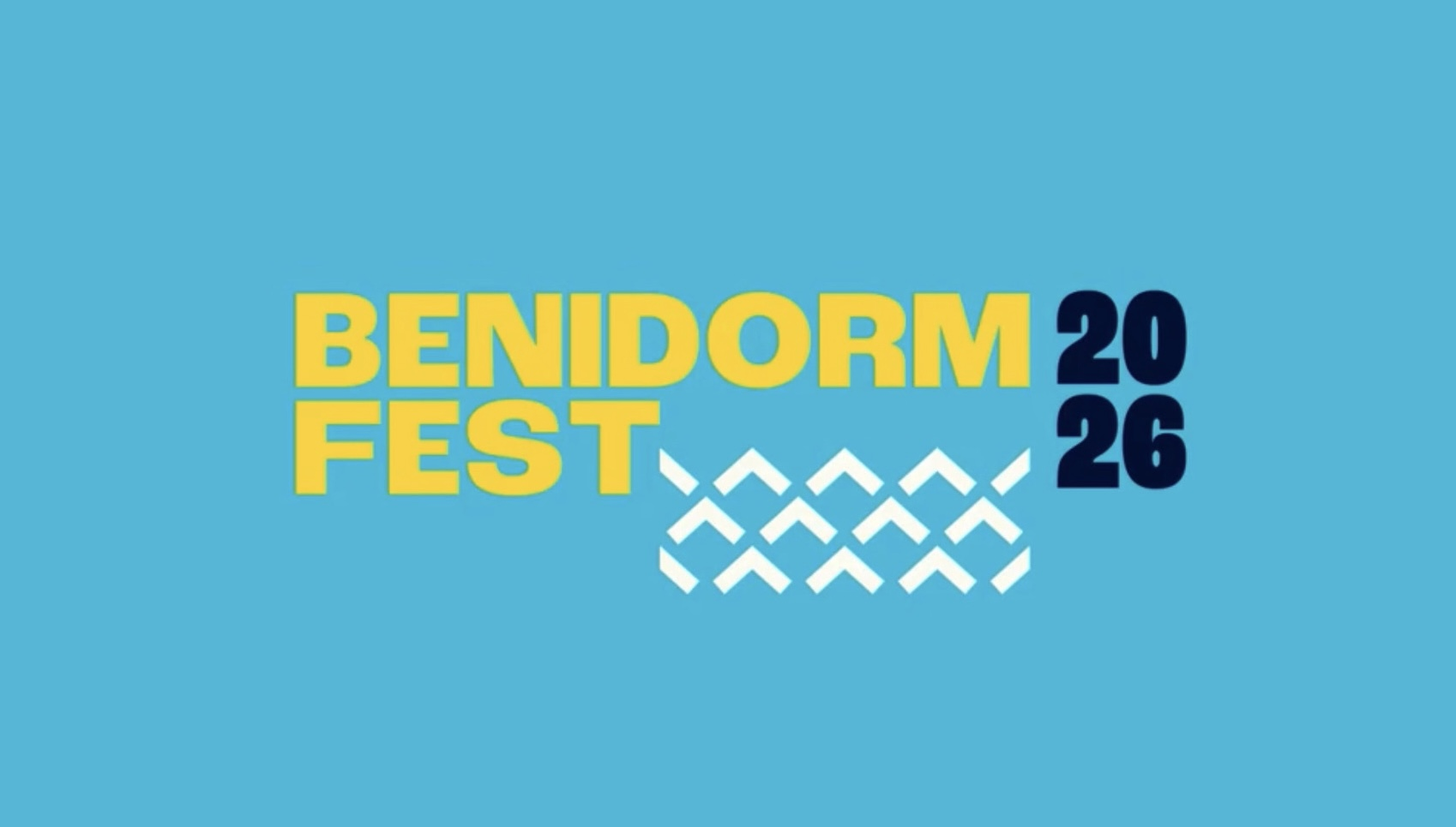

Dates and venue
- Semi-final 1: 10 February 2026
- Semi-final 2: 12 February 2026
- Final: 14 February 2026
- Venue: Palau Municipal d'Esports l'Illa de Benidorm; Benidorm, Spain

Production
- Broadcaster: Radiotelevisión Española (RTVE)
- Director: César Vallejo
- Artistic director: Sergio Jaén
- Executive supervisor: María Eizaguirre
- Presenters: Jesús Vázquez; Javier Ambrossi; Inés Hernand; Lalachus (final)

Participants
- Number of entries: 18
- Number of finalists: 12

Vote
- Voting system: Professional jury (50%), demoscopic jury (25%) and televote (25%)
- Winning song: "T amaré" by Tony Grox and Lucycalys

Benidorm Fest 2026 was the fifth edition of the annual Benidorm Fest, a television song contest held in Benidorm, Spain, organised and broadcast by Radiotelevisión Española (RTVE). The competition consisted of two semi-finals on 10 and 12 February, and a final on 14 February 2026. The winner was "T amaré", written by Antonio Ramírez Bernal and Carlos Prieto Cornejo and performed by Tony Grox and Lucycalys.

== Format ==
Radiotelevisión Española (RTVE) organised and broadcast Benidorm Fest 2026, the fifth edition of its annual Benidorm Fest. The competition consisted of two semi-finals and a final. In total, 18 candidate songs were divided between the two semi-finals, nine each. In each semi-final, the six songs with the most votes among a professional jury (50%), a demoscopic panel (25%) and the televote (25%), qualified to the final. During the final, the twelve qualified songs were performed again and the winner was determined following the same voting system as in the semi-finals. RTVE announced new features for this edition of the festival, such as a prize of €100,000 for the winning act and €50,000 for the songwriters.

Though the competition was initially announced as the method for selecting the Spanish entry in the Eurovision Song Contest 2026 in Vienna, Austria, on 16 September 2025, RTVE announced that it would not participate in Eurovision if Israel is allowed to compete due to the Gaza war, although it assured that the Benidorm Fest would be held regardless. On 4 December 2025, after Israel was approved to participate, RTVE announced its non-participation at Eurovision. As a result, this marked the first time in the Benidorm Fest's history that the winner is not given the chance to represent Spain in the Eurovision Song Contest. In addition to Spotify sponsoring an eponymous prize awarded to one of the participants, RTVE also announced a similar arrangement with TelevisaUnivision. The Spotify Award consisted of a trip to its main headquarters in Stockholm for a session in the platform's studios, and the Univision Award consisted of a promotional tour on TelevisaUnivision and the recording of a single with a producer from the Latin industry. Likewise, the main trophy design was revamped, returning to the Golden Mermaid used in the original Benidorm Song Festival; this revamped trophy was also awarded to all previous Benidorm Fest winners ahead of the 2026 edition.

=== Artistic director and creative team ===
On 26 June 2025, RTVE announced the appointment of Sergio Jaén, who served as artistic director of Austria's winning entry at the Eurovision Song Contest 2025 and Finland's Uuden Musiikin Kilpailu that same year, as artistic director of Benidorm Fest. The team also includes Finnish visual designer Ari Levelä as visual and lighting director, and Borja Rueda as choreographer.

=== Presenters ===
On 5 December 2025, Jesús Vázquez, Javier Ambrossi, and Inés Hernand, were announced as the hosts of the competition, with Lalachus joining for the final. In addition, each show was preceded by an introductory segment on RTVE Play, titled Benidorm Calling and hosted by Lalachus, Ángela Fernández, and Juanjo Bona, and the finale was followed by a commentary show, titled La noche del Benidorm and hosted by Lalachus and Inés Hernand.

=== Jury members ===
The jury consisted of eight members who are all professionals in the Spanish-speaking music industry, namely Sonia Durán (director of Unión Fonográfica Independiente), Alicia García (director of Strategic Agreements and Sponsorships for Starlite Group), Almudena Heredero (president of Mujeres de la Industria de la Música), Dani Ruiz (composer), Ignacio Meyer (TelevisaUnivision president), Javier Llano (content director of Cadena 100, Melani Parejo (director for Music in Southern and Eastern Europe for Spotify), and Roberto Santamaría (director of Radio Nacional de España), who also served as the jury spokesperson.

== Participants ==
RTVE published the rules and regulations for Benidorm Fest 2026 on 4 June 2025, opening a submission window lasting until 24 September 2025. In order for an entry to qualify to compete, performers and at least one songwriter must be Spanish citizens or permanent residents over the age of 16 (at least 50% of Spanish citizens or permanent residents in the case of groups), and songs must contain at least 60% of the lyrics in one of the official languages of Spain. On 26 September 2025, RTVE revealed that 870 entries had been received, including 350 that arrived on the last day of submissions.

The 18 participants, selected by a professional panel, were announced by María Eizaguirre on 9 October 2025 at Prado del Rey. The songs were announced on 18 December 2025.

Benidorm Fest 2026 selected artists and songs
Artist	Song	Composer(s)
ASHA	"Turista"	Hajar Sbihi; Nicole Zignago; Felipe González; Bruno Hermes Valverde Juárez
Atyat	"Dopamina"	Atyat; Yoby Zúñiga; Jorge Dellacruz; Dale Pututi
Dani J	"Bailándote"	Rafael Vergara Hermosilla
Dora and Marlon Collins	"Rakatá"	Edu Requejo; Andrés Pardo Torres; Dora Postigo
Funambulista	"Sobran gilipo**as"	Diego Cantero; Luis Ramiro
Greg Taro	"Velita"	Blake Martin; Greg Taro; Jheynner Argote; Yoby Zuñiga
Izan Llunas	"¿Qué vas a hacer?"	Diego Seijas; Izan Llunas; Aty
Kenneth	"Los ojos no mienten"	Carlos Alfredo Colina Acevedo; Iñigo Pérez Carramal
Kitai	"El amor te da miedo"	David Serrano; Kenya Saiz; Edu Venturo; Fabio Yanes
Ku Minerva	"No volveré a llorar"	Ignacio Canut; Mauro Canut; Fernando Delgado; Juan Sueiro
Luna Ki	"Bomba de amor"	Luna Górriz; Eduardo García Daban
María León feat. Julia Medina	"Las damas y el vagabundo"	María León; Pablo Cebrián; Teresa Ferrer; Adrián Atalaya
Mayo	"Tócame"	Álvaro Gutiérrez Mayo; Raúl Gómez; Ana Julieta Calavia; Rose Molina; Liam Garner
Mikel Herzog Jr.	"Mi mitad"	Mikel Herzog Jr.; Dani HDZ; Iván Herzog
Miranda! and Bailamamá	"Despierto amándote"	Alejandro Gustavo Sergi Galante; Gerardo López Von Linden; Diego Román Gutman Goldfinger
Rosalinda Galán	"Mataora"	Rosalinda Galán Parrales; Greta Chasca Rocchi; Ainoa Buitrago
The Quinquis	"Tú no me quieres"	Sergio Sastre; Maximiliano Jiménez; Marcos Miranda
Tony Grox and Lucycalys	"T amaré"	Antonio Ramírez Bernal; Carlos Prieto Cornejo

== Contest overview ==
=== Semi-final 1 ===
The first semi-final took place on 10 February 2026. Nine artists competed and six qualified for the final. The show began with a video presentation featuring old footage from Benidorm narrated by Jordi Hurtado. In addition to the competing entries, the semi-final featured Fangoria as an opening act, performing their songs "Dramas y comedias" and "Espectacular"; and Paloma San Basilio as an interval act, performing her songs "La fiesta terminó" and "Juntos". Following the end of all competing performances, it was announced that Luna Ki had retired from the "Green Room" as she was feeling unwell. Later, her team confirmed she had suffered an anxiety attack following her performance.

Semi-final 1 – 10 February 2026
R/O	Artist	Song	Expert jury	Demoscopic jury	Televote		Total	Place
R/O	Artist	Song	Expert jury	Demoscopic jury	Votes	Points	Total	Place
1	Kitai	"El amor te da miedo"	78	20	2,382	32	130	4
2	María León feat. Julia Medina	"Las damas y el vagabundo"	37	24	2,071	24	85	6
3	Luna Ki	"Bomba de amor"	36	16	1,427	16	68	7
4	Greg Taro	"Velita"	18	12	537	8	38	9
5	Izan Llunas	"¿Qué vas a hacer?"	71	48	2,136	28	147	2
6	Dora and Marlon Collins	"Rakatá"	41	8	1,389	12	61	8
7	Tony Grox and Lucycalys	"T amaré"	63	40	6,454	48	151	1
8	Mikel Herzog Jr.	"Mi mitad"	38	32	2,026	20	90	5
9	Kenneth	"Los ojos no mienten"	74	28	2,922	40	142	3

=== Semi-final 2 ===
The second semi-final took place on 12 February 2026. Nine artists competed and six qualified for the final. In addition to the competing entries, the semi-final featured Abraham Mateo as an opening act, performing a medley of the songs "Qué tal te va sin mí", "Maníaca", and "Quiero decirte", and Luz Casal as an interval act, performing her songs "¿Qué has hecho conmigo?" and "Rufino".

Semi-final 2 – 12 February 2026
R/O	Artist	Song	Expert jury	Demoscopic jury	Televote		Total	Place
R/O	Artist	Song	Expert jury	Demoscopic jury	Votes	Points	Total	Place
1	Asha	"Turista"	63	16	1,809	16	95	5
2	Ku Minerva	"No volveré a llorar"	22	28	1,535	12	62	9
3	Funambulista	"Sobran gilipo**as"	41	40	1,489	8	89	7
4	Dani J	"Bailándote"	51	32	2,008	20	103	4
5	The Quinquis	"Tú no me quieres"	82	20	2,182	24	126	2
6	Atyat	"Dopamina"	23	24	2,646	28	75	8
7	Rosalinda Galán	"Mataora"	61	48	6,088	48	157	1
8	Mayo	"Tócame"	45	8	4,095	40	93	6
9	Miranda! and Bailamamá	"Despierto amándote"	68	12	3,122	32	112	3

=== Final ===
The final took place on 14 February 2026 and featured 12 entries. Tony Grox and Lucycalys won the contest with the song "T amaré". They were also awarded with the Univision Award, while the Spotify Award was awarded to Asha.

In addition to the competing entries, the final was opened by last year's winner Melody, performing her songs "Esa diva", "El apagón", and "Alarma". The interval acts included a medley of past Benidorm Fest entries: "Zorra" by Nebulossa, "Quiero arder" by Agoney, "Eaea" by Blanca Paloma, "Caliente" by Jorge González, "Brillos platino" by Almácor, "Uh nana" by Daniela Blasco, and "Nochentera" by Vicco, which ended with all of them performing "Eres tú", originally by Mocedades; and Chanel, performing her songs "Antillas", "Matahari", "Zakazá", "Una bala", and "SloMo".

Final – 14 February 2026
R/O	Artist	Song	Expert jury	Demoscopic jury	Televote		Total	Place
R/O	Artist	Song	Expert jury	Demoscopic jury	Votes	Points	Total	Place
1	Mayo	"Tócame"	24	4	3,695	36	64	11
2	Kitai	"El amor te da miedo"	51	20	2,842	32	103	6
3	Asha	"Turista"	92	28	2,369	24	144	2
4	Dani J	"Bailándote"	40	32	2,122	8	80	9
5	The Quinquis	"Tú no me quieres"	65	16	2,225	12	93	7
6	Izan Llunas	"¿Qué vas a hacer?"	71	48	2,318	20	139	4
7	Mikel Herzog Jr.	"Mi mitad"	23	40	2,305	16	79	10
8	María León feat. Julia Medina	"Las damas y el vagabundo"	30	24	2,814	28	82	8
9	Rosalinda Galán	"Mataora"	52	44	8,927	44	140	3
10	Kenneth	"Los ojos no mienten"	24	12	1,498	4	40	12
11	Miranda! and Bailamamá	"Despierto amándote"	70	8	3,848	40	118	5
12	Tony Grox and Lucycalys	"T amaré"	82	36	11,100	48	166	1
