= Lucycalys =

Spanish singer (born 2006)

Background information
- Born: Lucía Sánchez Manzorro; March 22, 2006 (age 20); Chiclana de la Frontera, Cádiz, Spain
- Occupations: Singer; Actress
- Instrument: Vocals
- Years active: 2024–present

Lucía Sánchez Manzorro (born March 22, 2006), known professionally as Lucycalys (stylised in all caps), is a Spanish singer. She won Benidorm Fest 2026 alongside Tony Grox.

== Early life ==
Manzorro is from Cádiz, specifically Chiclana de la Frontera, and has Andalusian roots. She has a background in musical theatre and trained as an actress. She received training at the conservatory in Chiclana, specifically in the choir. She learnt how to sing with guitarist Manu Dorante. Manzorro took guitar and piano lessons throughout her childhood.

== Career ==
=== 2024-2025: Tour Music Fest and musical releases ===
Manzorro was a finalist in the Tour Music Fest with her cover of "Catalina" by Rosalía. Throughout 2024 and 2025, she released the singles, "Ápeiron", "Gala", and "Piel de bronze". In 2025, she performed her first solo concert at the "Acutel Andalusia Day Gala".

In June 2025, Manzorro auditioned for that year's edition of Operación Triunfo.

=== 2025-present: Benidorm Fest and Del amor y del mar ===
In October 2025, Manzorro was announced as one of the participants for Benidorm Fest 2026, set to perform "T amaré" with DJ Tony Grox. The duo advanced to the grand final and won with a total of 166 points. They won €100,000 and a trip to Miami to work with a music team through a Univision prize. They also won the "Sirenita de Oro" trophy, which was reintroduced for Benidorm Fest's fifth anniversary.

In March 2026, Manzorro performed alongside Tony Grox at the closing gala of the 29th Málaga Film Festival.

She released "La Barrosa", the first single of her first EP, Del amor y del mar on 28 May 2026. The single was also produced by Tony Grox. Her EP was released on 18 July 2026 and features a collaboration with Cris Lora, the winner of Operación Triunfo 2025. To promote Del amor y del mar, she performed a concert at the Atenas Playa bar in Chiclana de la Frontera.

Manzorro once again performed alongside Tony Grox at the celebration of Spain's victory at the 2026 FIFA World Cup in Madrid, at the Plaza de Cibeles. Many relevant Spanish artists such as Aitana, Ana Mena and Lola Índigo also performed at the celebration.

== Discography ==
=== Singles ===
- "ÁPEIRON" (2024)
- "GALA" (2025)
- "Piel de Bronze" (2025)
- "T amaré" (2025)
- "La Barrosa" (2026)

=== EPs ===
- Del amor y del mar (2026)

=== Collaborations ===
- "Confía" with Sabah (2026)

Awards and achievements
Preceded by Melody	Benidorm Fest winner (with Tony Grox); 2026	Succeeded by TBD
