= Inés Hernand =

Spanish TV personality

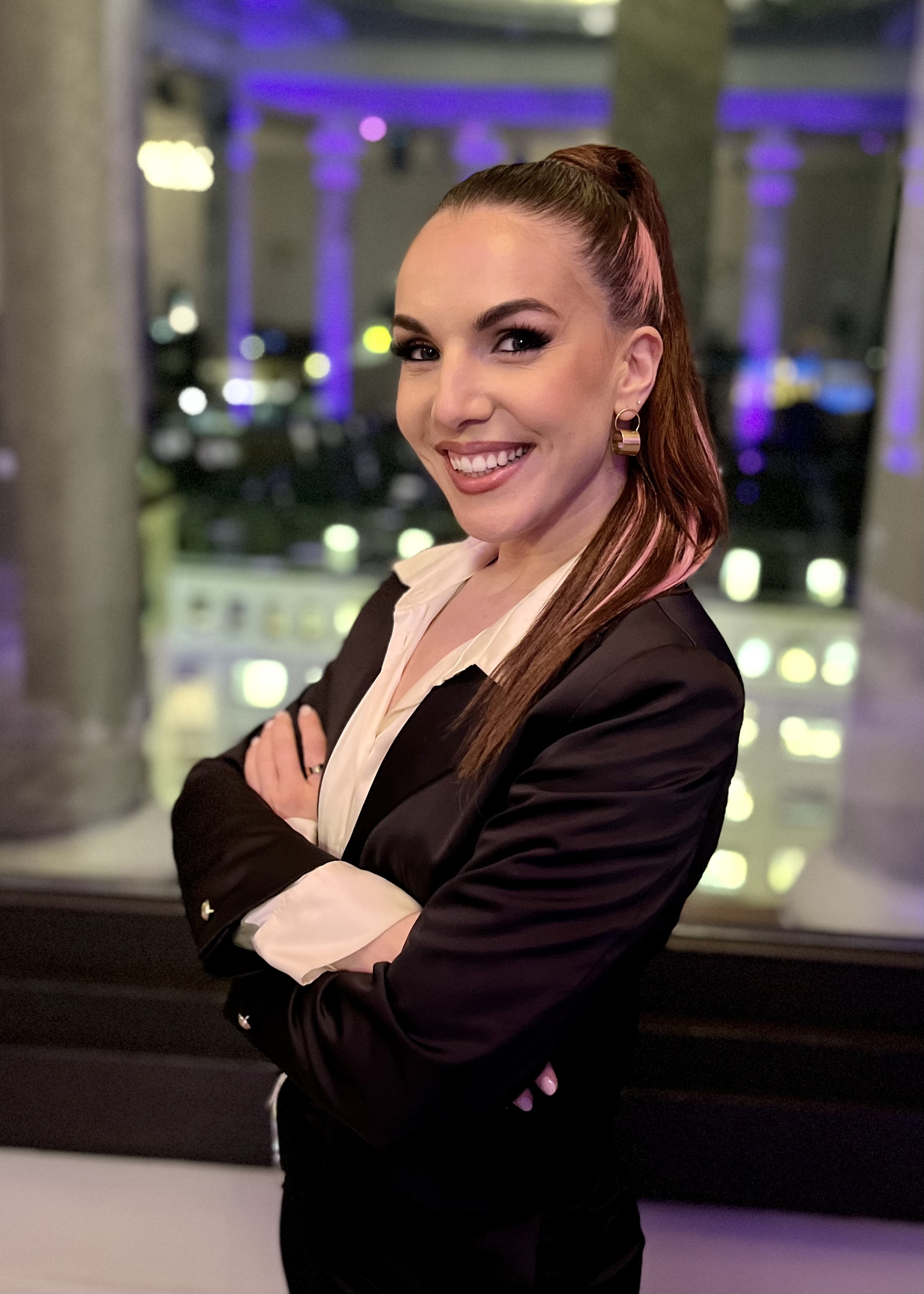
- Hernand in 2022.
- Born: Inés Judit Hernández Martínez; 10 May 1992 (age 34); Madrid, Spain
- Occupations: Lawyer, influencer, youtuber, comedian, TV host

Inés Judit Hernández Martínez (born 10 May 1992), known as Inés Hernand, is a Spanish lawyer, influencer, comedian, communicator, and television presenter.

In 2022, she was one of the hosts of the Benidorm Fest, a song contest organized by RTVE to select the song that would represent Spain at the Eurovision Song Contest. She also hosted the 2023, 2025 and 2026 editions.

== Trajectory ==
Inés Judit Hernández Martínez was born in Madrid in 1992. Hernand graduated in law from the Complutense University of Madrid in 2017. Subsequently, she completed a master's degree in Advocacy at the same university. After taking and passing the State Examination for Admission to the Bar, Hernand became a lawyer and worked as one for a while.

While studying law, Hernand opened a YouTube channel called Inés Responde, where she began to upload videos in which she talked about legal issues in an informative way and gave legal advice on a variety of topics such as renting an apartment, traffic fines, or sales. Thanks to these videos, where she got thousands of views, she began to have a great impact on social media.

Since 2015, Hernand, alongside Darío Eme Hache, presents the talk show Gen Playz on RTVE's youth digital platform Playz, where together with guests from different areas they talk about topics such as mental health, menstruation, politics, or the LGBT collective. This show won Best Entertainment Program at the 2021 Ondas Awards. In May 2021, Hernand, together with her friend and roommate, YouTuber Andrea Compton, produced the vodcast entitled Dulces y saladas for Prime Video. Two years earlier, in 2019, Hernand and Compton had published the autobiographical novel Que el fin del mundo te pille de risas.

In the field of podcasts, since October 2021, together with Nerea Pérez de las Heras, she directs and conducts the political current affairs program Saldremos mejores within the Podium Podcast platform. Hernand also produces a comedy and precariousness podcast called Payasos y fuego together with comedian Ignatius Farray.

In 2022, she was the co-host of the Benidorm Fest competition, organized by RTVE to select the song that would represent Spain at the Eurovision Song Contest. She hosted this contest alongside writer Màxim Huerta and singer Alaska.

In March 2022, RTVE announced that Hernand would present the variety talk show La noche D on La 1 together with comedian Eva Soriano, replacing Dani Rovira, who had hosted the program so far.

In 2023 the Spanish public channel RTVE was forced to withdraw from its networks the Gen Playz chapter in which; being broadcast strictly live during the Pride festival and on dates close to a general election, the presenter said " I have to say that the good guys always win, so of course, even though the violence is structural, I have no doubt about the victory of a progressive government in the next general elections." using the public medium as her own to express her personal political views.

Hernand collaborates with several digital media, such as HuffPost since May 2021 as a reporter, or eldiario.es, where she has published opinion columns in its Tribuna Abierta section since February 2022. She has also been a contributor to the program La resistencia presented by David Broncano, since September 2021.

== Work ==
- 2019 – Que el fin del mundo te pille de risas. With Andrea Compton. Penguin Random House Grupo Editorial. ISBN 9788420452616.
