= Kitai (band) =

Spanish rock band

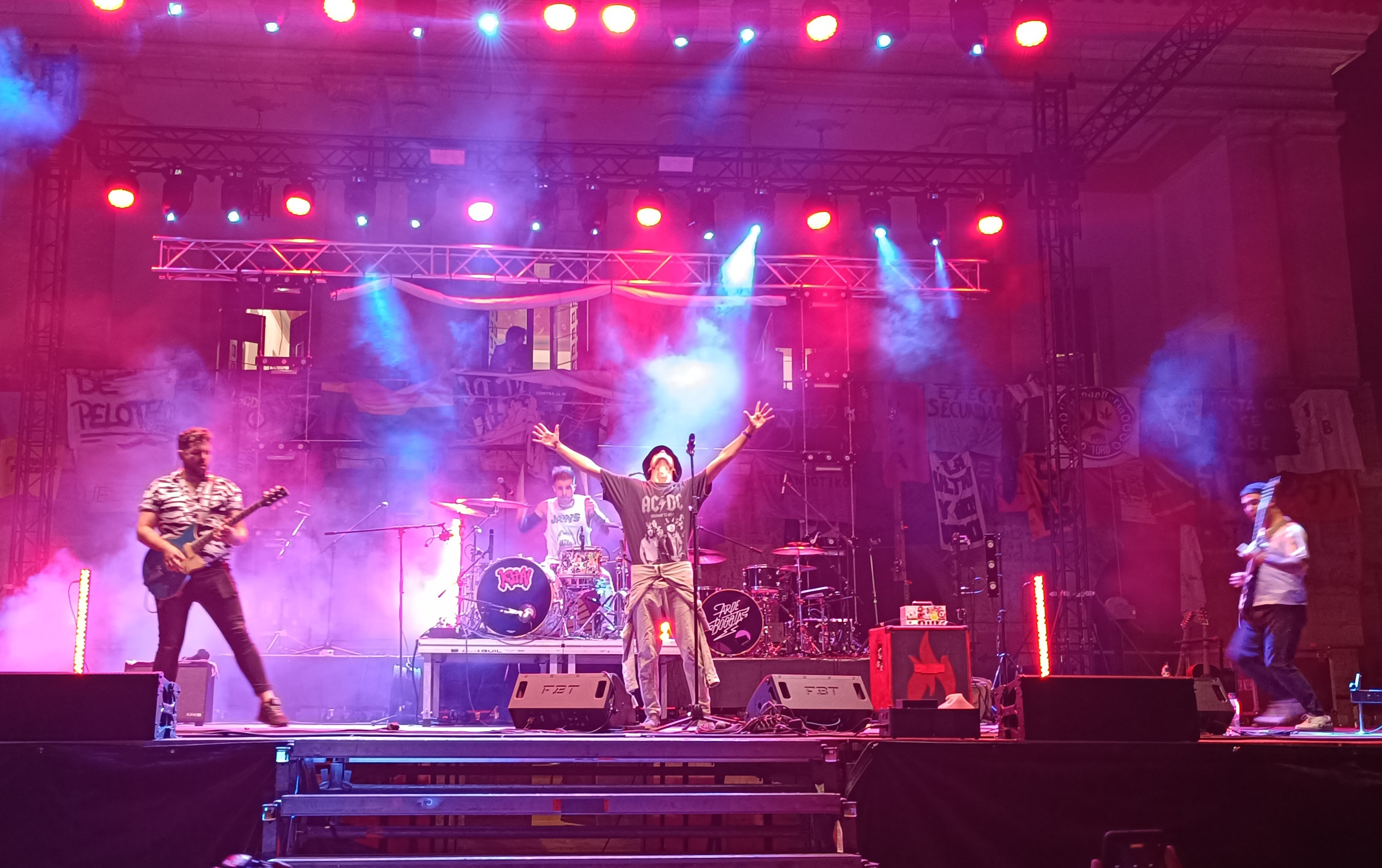
- Kitai in August 2023

Background information
- Origin: Madrid, Spain
- Genres: Rock; indie rock
- Years active: 2012–present
- Members: Kenya Saiz; Eduardo Venturo; Fabio Yanes; David "Deivhook" Serrano

Kitai is a Spanish rock band from Madrid, formed in 2012. They have released five official albums, plus three EPs. On 16 November 2018, they became the first band to be able to play for 24 hours straight, thus entering the Guinness World Records.

== History ==
In 2015, Kitai released their first album, "Que Vienen," which catapulted them to the top of the Spanish rock scene, performing at festivals such as DCODE and Sonorama Ribera.

In February 2018, Metallica drummer Lars Ulrich recommended Kitai on his radio show, It's Electric. Two years later, they announced the release of their second album, "Pirómanos." Their most notable concerts on this tour were at the Cooltural Fest in Almería on 9 July, Resurrection Fest in Vivero, Galicia, and Sonorama Ribera in Aranda de Duero, Burgos. The tour concluded with a grand concert at La Riviera in Madrid.

Kitai was chosen as a surprise artist to perform at the Plaza del Trigo of the Sonorama Ribera Festival in the 2019 edition, putting on one of the most acclaimed shows and collaborating with artists such as Second, Varry Brava, Shinova, Miss Caffeina, and Rafa Gutiérrez, guitarist of Hombres G, among others.

In October 2020, the band released their third album, Mixtape, an album that mainly mixes with the urban world and whose first singles feature collaborations with Rayden, Swan Fyabwoy, El Chojin, IKKI and Taburete.

After two years of silence, on 1 July 2022, the band returned to the media scene and made history by giving the first rock concert in the air in a hot air balloon. In October 2022, KITAI announced their fourth studio album, entitled No somos tu p*** banda de pop, accompanied by a new milestone for the band: the first eco-sustainable tour in Spain using an electric van.

Kitai was one of the 18 participants announced for Benidorm Fest 2026 on 9 October 2025. In Semi-Final 1, they received 130 points and placed in fourth place. In the Grand Final, they received 103 points, placing them in sixth place.

== Band members ==
- Kenya Saiz – lead vocals
- Eduardo Venturo – guitars
- Fabio Yanes – bass
- David "Deivhook" Serrano – drums

== Discography ==
- 2013 Origen (EP)
- 2014 Viral (EP)
- 2015 Que Vienen (LP)
- 2017 Llegan (EP)
- 2017 Pirómanos (LP)
- 2018 Fahrenheit (EP)
- 2020 Mixtape (LP)
- 2022 No somos tu p*** banda de pop (LP)
- 2026 El Bar De Siempre (LP)
