= Future (Schiller album) =

Studio album by Schiller
- Released: February 26, 2016
- Recorded: 2015
- Genre: Electronic, ambient, synth-pop
- Label: Island Records (Universal Music Germany)
- Producer: Christopher von Deylen

Schiller chronology
Symphonia (2014)	Future (2016)	Morgenstund (2019)

Singles from Future
- 1. "Paradise (mit Arlissa)" Released: February 2016

Future is the ninth studio album of the music project Schiller created by the German electronic musician Christopher von Deylen. The album was released on February 26, 2016. On this album Schiller has collaborated with the singers Kêta, Arlissa, Emma Hewitt, Samu Haber, Sheppard Solomon, Maggie Szabo, Cristina Scabbia and Tawgs Salter and with Sharon Stone, who wrote the lyrics of "For You". The album reached in its first week number 1 of the German albums chart. This is Schiller's fifth number-1-album in Germany.

It was released in different editions, including the limited "Ultra Deluxe Edition". It's the first studio album of Schiller with a title in English language. The cover art work includes pictures by photographer Philip Glaser. On May 26, 2016 the Standard Edition was released on Spotify.

The album is something of a departure from Schiller's previous body of work, with a somewhat harsher and colder sound and style, and with more focus on synth pop than ambient soundscapes. It also features a number of vocalists that Schiller had not previously worked with, whilst regular vocalists from recent years do not appear at all.

The music video of The Future I + II had its world premiere on December 26, 2015 on YouTube. The first single Paradise featuring Arlissa was released in February 2016 and the music video had its premiere on February 17, 2016.

After the release of Opus in 2013, Schiller announced that there will be no release of a new studio album until 2016. For the production of the album von Deylen left Berlin and moved to California and spent some time in the Mojave Desert.

Von Deylen describes his album as a movie soundtrack, which has to be listened as whole.

== Track listings ==
=== Deluxe edition ===
The blue Deluxe edition includes an audio CD and a DVD.

1. Willkommen
2. The Future I (with Kêta)
3. The Future II (with Kêta)
4. The Future III
5. Sweet Symphony (My Heart Beats Again) (with Sheppard Solomon)
6. Paradise (with Arlissa)
7. Schwerelos
8. Zwischen Gestern und Morgen
9. Once Upon a Time I
10. Once Upon a Time II
11. I Breathe (with Cristina Scabbia)
12. Mirai
13. Not in Love (with Arlissa)
14. Save Me a Day (with Samu Haber)
15. Die Nacht gehört uns
16. Looking Out For You (Against the Tide) (with Emma Hewitt)
17. For You (with Tawgs Salter)

=== Super deluxe edition ===
The red Super deluxe edition includes three audio CDs and a DVD.

CD 1 - Future I

1. Willkommen
2. The Future I (with Kêta)
3. The Future II (with Kêta)
4. The Future III
5. Rubinrot
6. Sweet Symphony (My Heart Beats Again) (with Sheppard Solomon)
7. Paradise (with Arlissa)
8. Schwerelos
9. Zwischen Gestern und Morgen
10. Something There (with Maggie Szabo)
11. Once Upon a Time I
12. Once Upon a Time II
13. I Breathe (with Cristina Scabbia)
14. Jupitermond
15. Once Upon a Time - Reprise
16. Looking Out For You (Against the Tide) (with Emma Hewitt)

CD 2 - Future II

1. Die Reise geht weiter
2. Not in Love (with Arlissa)
3. Little Earthquakes (with Sheppard Solomon)
4. Little Earthquakes - Reprise
5. The Wait is Over (with Kêta)
6. Turqoise
7. Wellenreiter
8. Mirai
9. Es ist voller Sterne
10. Only Love (with Emma Hewitt)
11. Save Me a Day (with Samu Haber)
12. Die Nacht gehört uns
13. Forget (with Kêta)
14. For You (with Tawgs Salter)
15. Future - Reprise

CD 3 - Philharmonia

Live from the Philharmonia in Berlin

1. Exposition
2. Desert Empire
3. Oasis
4. Denn wer liebt
5. Ruhe
6. Ultramarin
7. Sonnenuhr
8. Berlin - Moskau
9. Atemlos
10. Mitternacht
11. Swan Lake
12. Das Glockenspiel

DVD - Future III

=== Ultra deluxe edition ===
The black limited Ultra deluxe edition includes the audio CDs Future I, Future II, Philharmonia and the DVD Future III and the bonus CD Tal des Himmels.

Bonus CD - Tal des Himmels

1. Tal des Himmels Eins
2. Tal des Himmels Zwei
3. Tal des Himmels Drei
4. Tal des Himmels Vier
5. Tal des Himmels Fünf
6. Tal des Himmels Sechs
7. Tal des Himmels Sieben

=== Vinyl ===
The limited violet vinyl edition includes two vinyls.

LP 1

1. The Future I
2. The Future II
3. Schwerelos
4. Zwischen gestern und morgen
5. Paradise
6. Forget
7. Looking Out For You (Against the Tide)

LP 2

1. Sweet Symphony (My Heart Beats Again)
2. Mirai
3. Es ist voller Sterne
4. The Wait is Over
5. Once Upon a Time I
6. Once Upon a Time II
7. Die Nacht gehört uns
8. For You

== Credits and personnel ==
- Christopher von Deylen – music and production of all tracks except of "For You", lyrics of all vocal tracks except of "For You", production of "For You"
- Franziska Pigulla – voice on "Willkommen"
- Kêta Jo McCue – music, lyrics and vocals on "The Future I", "The Future II", "The Wait is Over", "Forget"
- Arlissa Ruppert – music, lyrics and vocals on "Paradise", "Not in Love"
- Sheppard Solomon – music, lyrics and vocals on "Sweet Symphony (My Heart Beats Again)", "Little Earthquakes"; music and lyrics on "Save Me a Day"
- Clare Reynolds – music and lyrics on "Paradise"
- Maggie Szabo – music, lyrics and vocals on "Something There"
- Cristina Scabbia – music, lyrics and vocals on "I Breathe"
- Emma Hewitt – music, lyrics and vocals on "Looking Out For You (Against the Tide)", "Only Love"
- Anthony Hewitt – lyrics on "Looking Out For You (Against the Tide)"
- Sinai Tedros – music and lyrics on "Not in Love"
- Samu Haber – vocals on "Save Me a Day"
- Thomas Tawgs Salter – music and vocals on "For You"
- Sharon Vonne Stone – lyrics on "For You"
- Windy Wagner – background vocals on "The Future II", "Sweet Symphony (My Heart Beats Again)" "Paradise", "Once Upon a Time I", "I Breathe", "Once Upon a Time - Reprise", "Looking Out For You (Against the Tide)", "Little Earthquakes", "Only Love", "Save Me a Day", "Forget", "For You"
- Amy Keys – background vocals on "Sweet Symphony (My Heart Beats Again)"
- Samantha Nelson – background vocals on "Paradise", "Something There", "Once Upon a Time I", "Looking Out For You (Against the Tide)", "Not in Love", "Save Me a Day"
- Carmel Echols – background vocals on "Paradise", "Something There", "Once Upon a Time I", "Looking Out For You (Against the Tide)", "Not in Love", "Save Me a Day"
- Chaz Mason – background vocals on "Paradise", "Something There", "Once Upon a Time I", "Looking Out For You (Against the Tide)", "Not in Love", "Save Me a Day"
- Onitsa Shaw – background vocals on "Looking Out For You (Against the Tide)", "Little Earthquakes"

=== Instruments ===
- John Groover McDuffie – pedal steel guitar on "Paradise", "Schwerelos"

=== Cover art ===
- Schiller – concept of the neon light sign
- Philip Glaser – photography
- Kyle Monk – guest photographer
- Katja Stier – design

== Charts ==
=== Weekly charts ===
Chart (2016)	Peak position
Austrian Albums (Ö3 Austria)	20
German Albums (Offizielle Top 100)	1
Swiss Albums (Schweizer Hitparade)	14

=== Weekly charts ===
Chart (2016)	Position
German Albums (Offizielle Top 100)	54
