= Izan Llunas =

Spanish singer and actor (born 2004)

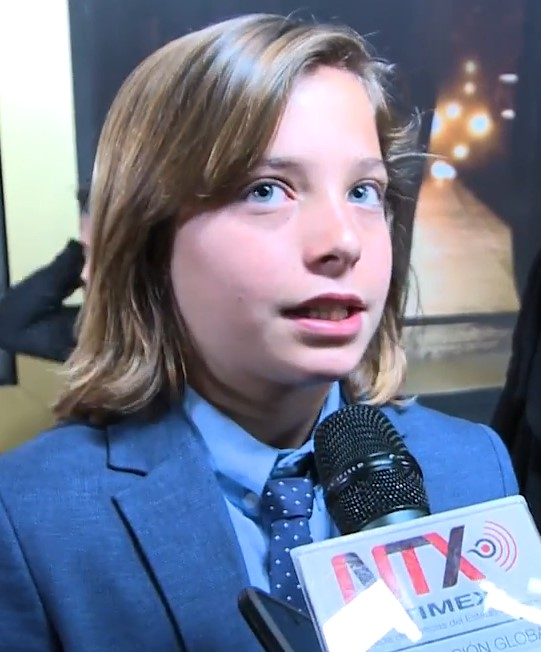
- Llunas in 2018
- Born: 28 September 2004 (age 22); Ibiza, Spain
- Occupations: Singer, actor
- Years active: 2017–present
- Father: Marcos Llunas
- Relatives: Dyango (grandfather)

Izan Llunas (born 28 September 2004) is a Spanish singer and actor. He is best known for his participation in the competition program La Voz Kids, and for his starring role in the Netflix series Luis Miguel, a biopic on the Mexican singer Luis Miguel.

Llunas was born in Ibiza. He is the son of singer Marcos Llunas and the grandson of Dyango.

He participated in the 2026 edition of Benidorm Fest with the song "¿Qué vas a hacer?", placing fourth in the final. In June 2026, he released the single "¿Para qué más?".

== Filmography ==
Television roles
| Year | Title | Role | Notes |
|---|---|---|---|
| 2017 | La Voz Kids | Himself | Competitor |
| 2018 | Luis Miguel | Micky | Main role (season 1); 7 episodes |
| 2018 | Morfi, todos a la mesa | Himself | Voice role |
| 2026 | Benidorm Fest 2026 | Himself | Competitor with "¿Qué vas a hacer?" |
