= Rayden (rapper) =

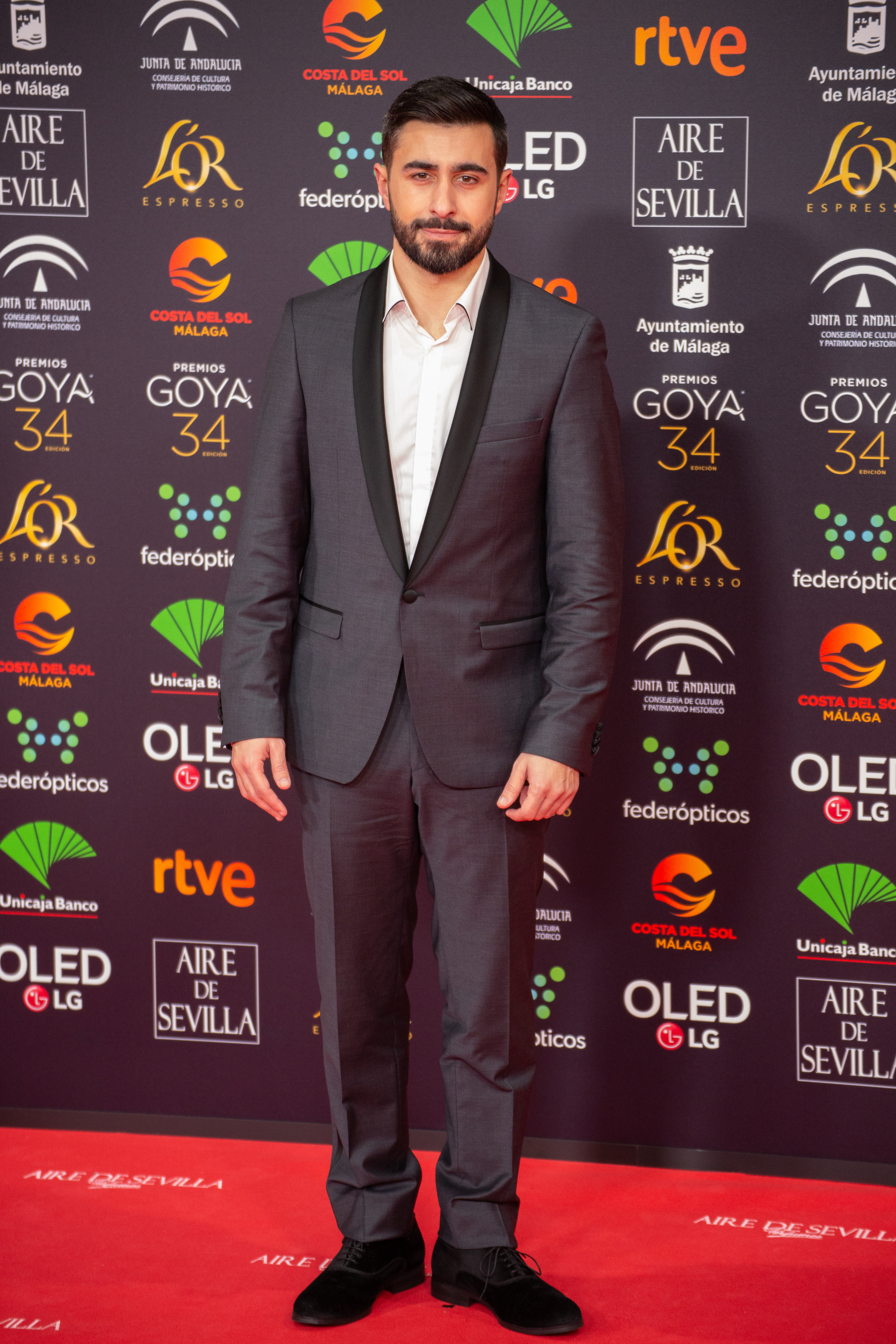
- Rayden in 2020

Background information
- Born: David Martínez Álvarez; 30 July 1985 (age 41); Alcalá de Henares, Spain
- Occupations: Rapper; singer
- Formerly of: A3Bandas; Crew Cuervos

David Martínez Álvarez (born 30 July 1985), better known by his stage name Rayden, is a Spanish rapper.

== Career ==
Rayden was a member of rap groups A3Bandas and Crew Cuervos.

In 2006, Rayden won the freestyle rap competition Red Bull Batalla de los Gallos. He participated again in 2009, and was eliminated in the semi-finals.

Rayden released his first solo studio album, Estaba escrito, in 2010. His second album, Mosaico, was published in 2012, and the third, En alma y hueso, was released in 2014.

His fourth studio album, Antónimo (2017) initiated a trilogy completed by Sinónimo (2019) and Homónimo (2021).

In November 2021, Rayden headlined a concert at the WiZink Center in Madrid dedicated to his twentieth anniversary as an artist.

In December 2021, he was selected to participate in the first edition of Benidorm Fest, the song festival organised to determine Spain's entry for the Eurovision Song Contest, with the song "Calle de la llorería". He finished in fourth place.

In March 2023, Rayden reported his intentions to quit music and focusing on writing. In April 2023, he released the album La victoria imposible, which he announced as his last as a recording and performing artist.

Following the 2023 municipal elections in Spain, Rayden cancelled the August 2024 concert in his native Alcalá de Henares set to put a closure to his musical career, due to "moral duty" in the wake of the arrival of the extreme right to areas of the municipal government.

In July 2023, it was announced Rayden would have a role on Benidorm Fest 2024 as a musical advisor.

== Discography ==
=== Albums ===
Title	Details	Peak chart positions
Title	Details	SPA
Estaba escrito	Released: 2010; Label: BOA Music	66
Mosaico	Released: 2012; Label: BOA Music	11
En alma y hueso	Released: 2014; Label: BOA Music	7
Antónimo	Released: 2017; Label: Warner Music	1
Sinónimo	Released: 2019; Label: Warner Music	18
Homónimo	Released: 2021; Label: Warner Music	4
La victoria imposible	Released: 21 April 2023; Label: Warner Music	5

== Awards and nominations ==
Year	Organization	Category	Nominee/work	Result	Ref.
2015	Premios MIN	Best Video	"Matemática de la carne"	Won	
2015	Premios MIN	Best Radio 3 Artist	Rayden	Won	
2015	MTV Europe Music Awards	Best Spanish Act	Rayden	Nominated	
2017	LOS40 Music Awards	LOS40 Trending Artist Award	Rayden	Nominated	
2022	Premios Odeón	Best Urban Album	Homónimo	Nominated	
