= Chanel Terrero =

Cuban-Spanish actress, singer and dancer

Chanel
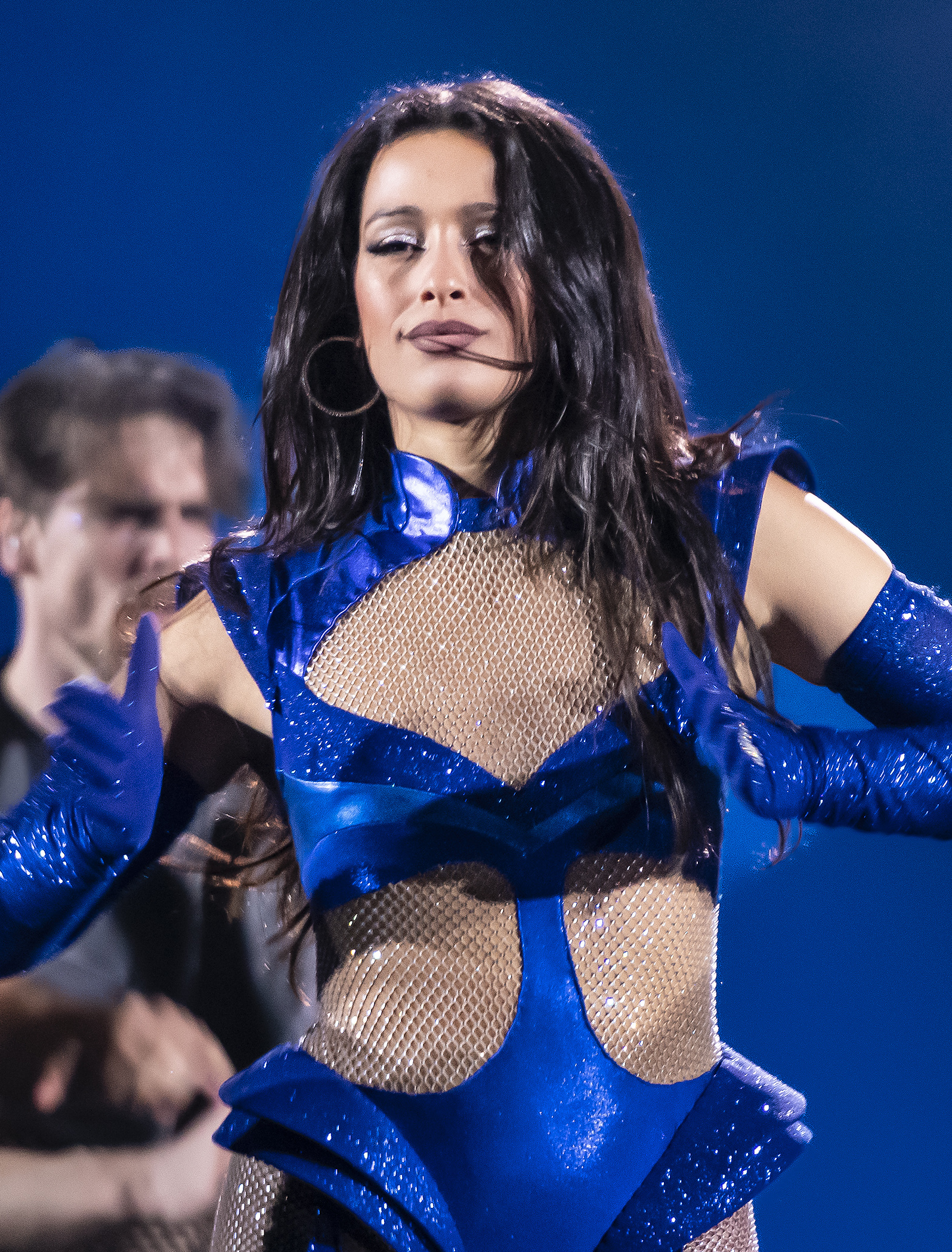
- Chanel in 2024

Background information
- Born: Chanel Terrero Martínez; 28 July 1991 (age 35); Havana, Cuba
- Origin: Olesa de Montserrat, Catalonia, Spain
- Genre: Pop
- Occupations: Singer; dancer; actress; model
- Instruments: Vocals
- Years active: 2010–present
- Labels: Sony Music Publishing; Sony Music Spain; Columbia France; BMG Rights Management Spain

Chanel Terrero Martínez (born 28 July 1991), known mononymously as Chanel (Spanish pronunciation: [tʃa'nel]), is a Cuban and Spanish singer, dancer and actress, having worked in several stage musicals. She represented Spain at the Eurovision Song Contest 2022, after having won Benidorm Fest 2022 with her debut single "SloMo". She finished in third place with 459 points, the best placing for Spain since the 1995 contest.

== Early life ==
Chanel was born in Havana, Cuba, and moved to Olesa de Montserrat in Catalonia, Spain, at the age of three. Part of her family is of Spanish origin.

She has taken singing, acting and ballet classes from a young age. She learned from choreographers such as Víctor Ullate, Coco Comín and Glòria Gella. At the age of sixteen, she started her career in musical theatre.

== Career ==
=== 2010–2021: Career beginnings ===
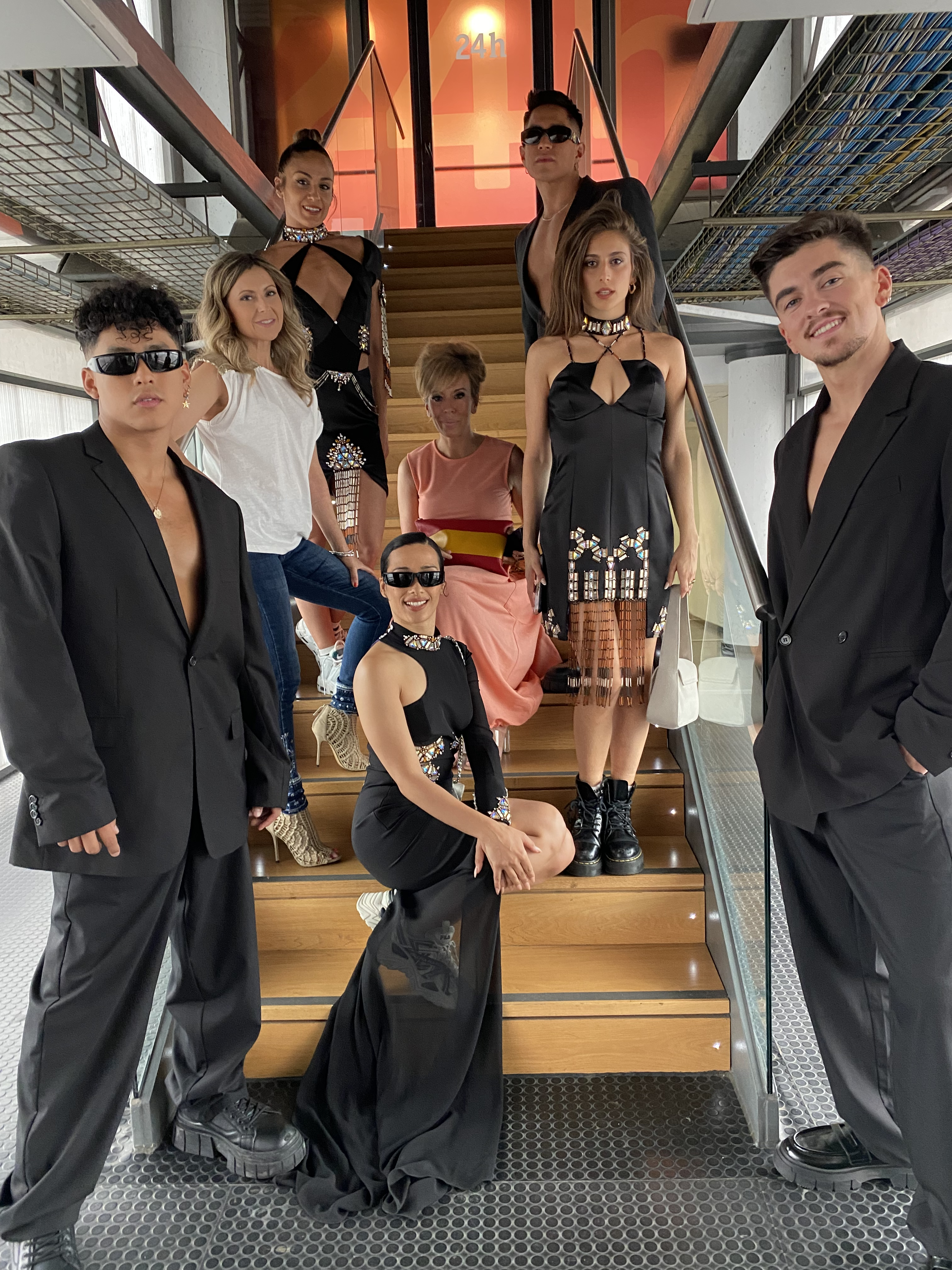
Terrero and other members of the Spain's delegation to the Eurovision Song Contest attending the TVE premises in Madrid on 15 May 2022 after their return from Turin

Chanel moved to Madrid to start her acting career. During the 2010s she participated in stage musicals such as Mamma Mia!, Flashdance, El Guardaespaldas and El Rey León.

Her acting career includes various roles on television and cinema, both nationally and internationally.

As a dancer, she has worked with different artists. In 2010, she was part of Shakira's dancing crew for a performance at the MTV Europe Music Awards.

She also was part of the dancing crew in the Spanish show Tu Cara Me Suena on Antena 3.

Chanel took part in the castings for the Spanish stage production of West Side Story. She was one of the three finalists for the role of Anita. She also was one of the five finalists worldwide for the same role in Steven Spielberg's film version of the musical, West Side Story.

=== 2022–2024: Benidorm Fest, Eurovision Song Contest, ¡Agua! and touring ===
She took part in Benidorm Fest in 2022 with her debut single "SloMo". Her performance was choreographed by Kyle Hanagami, who has also worked with Jennifer Lopez, Britney Spears and Blackpink, among other artists. She won the first semi-final on 26 January 2022, and also the final on 29 January, becoming the Spanish entrant for the Eurovision Song Contest 2022 in Turin, Italy. The song entered the Spanish Singles Chart at number thirteen. In the Eurovision final, the song placed third, Spain's best result since 1995. Following the contest, the song went on to top the Spanish Singles Chart and obtained a quadruple platinum certification by Promusicae. In 2024, it was revealed that originally the song was not going to be performed by Chanel, but by the singer Ana Guerra, but the latter rejected the proposal to perform it.

On 10 June 2022, she participated in the Carnival of Santa Cruz de Tenerife.

Her second single, titled "Toke", was released on 25 October 2022, as the official song of the Spain national football team for the 2022 FIFA World Cup and as RTVE’s theme song for their coverage of the tournament. On 13 January 2023, she released a new version of "Toke" titled "Toke (Si t'es ok)", with French rapper Ridsa.

On 2 February 2023, Chanel was announced as a judge for the RTVE singing competition series Cover Night.

On 14 and 15 April 2023, Chanel participated at the LOS40 Primavera Pop festival. She performed her singles "Toke", "SloMo" and "Clavaíto", a collaboration with Abraham Mateo that was released on 28 April 2023. It debuted on the Spanish Singles Chart at number twenty-four and in the subsequent weeks climbed to number six, obtaining a quadruple platinum certification.

On 19 May 2023, she released her fourth single titled "P.M.". On 13 July 2023, she announced the remixes of the last two singles, “P.M.” and “Clavaíto”, released on 14 and 21 July 2023.

On 23 July 2023, she announced her single, fifth overall, titled "Ping Pong", a collaboration with Spanish rapper Ptazeta that was released on 28 July 2023. It debuted on the Spanish Singles Chart at number ninety.

On 18 August 2023, she performed the first concert of the project ¡Agua! in Ciudad Real and presented three new songs: "House Party", "Lucky Me" and "Loka".

On 11 October 2023, she performed "P.M.", "Ping Pong" and "Clavaíto" in LOS 40 Pilar Pop in Zaragoza. On 21 October 2023, she performed "P.M." and "Clavaíto", with Abraham Mateo, in the concert of CADENA 100 Por Ellas in Madrid.

On 29 October 2023, she announced her single, titled "Loka", a collaboration with Maikel Delacalle. It was released on 3 November 2023, alongside the pre-order of her debut album, titled ¡Agua!, released on 12 January 2024. On the same day she performed "Loka", along "Clavaíto", in LOS40 Music Awards 2023. She also won the Best Spanish Collaboration with "Clavaíto".

On 6 January 2024, she announced her new single, titled "Ahora Que No Te Tengo", a collaboration with rapper FMK that was released on 9 January 2024.

On 22 January 2024, her debut album debuted on the Spanish Albums Chart at number one.

On 7 May 2024, Chanel performed as one of the opening acts, alongsise Eleni Foureira and Eric Saade, in the first semi-final of the Eurovision Song Contest 2024.

=== 2025–present: New era, touring and Benidorm Fest ===
On 17 May 2025, Chanel was the spokesperson revealing the Spanish jury votes in the final of the Eurovision Song Contest 2025.

On 2025, she released the singles "Antillas", "Una Bala", "Zakaza" and "Matahari", a collaboration with singer Lapili, and went on tour.

On 14 February 2026, Chanel performed a medley of "Antillas", "Matahari", "Zakaza", "Una Bala" and "SloMo" as one of the performers in the final of the Benidorm Fest 2026.

On 2026, she released the singles "Es Tan Fácil", and "UNOxUNO", and went on tour.

== Theatre work ==
She has taken part in several musical productions, becoming a regular name in this genre in Spain.

- Fiebre Hamilton (musical homage to Lin-Manuel Miranda in Madrid).
- El Guardaespaldas (main character).
- Flashdance (actress/singer in Barcelona and tour).
- Nine (main actress/singer).
- El Rey León (Teatro Lope de Vega Madrid).
- Mamma Mia! (actress, singer and dancer).
- Lío Ibiza (cabaret: actress, singer and dancer).
- El Gran Libro Mágico (children's musical, main actress/singer).
- Show “Starlite Marbella” (lead singer).
- Delizia (cabaret: actress, singer and dancer).
- La Ratita Presumida, centro estético (children's musical, lead role).
- El Lobo Y Las 7 Cabritas (children's musical, lead role).
- Tarzán (children's musical, singer and dancer).
- Mortadelo Y Filemón (dancer and actress).

== Filmography ==
=== Film ===
Year	Title	Role	Notes
2011	Fuga de Cerebros 2	—	—
2015	The King of Havana	Yamilé	—
2018	El Último Invierno	—	—
2019	La Llorona	—	Short film
2024	Inside Out 2	Ennui	Spanish Voice

=== Television ===
==== Fiction ====
Year	TV series	Network	Role	Notes
2011	Águila Roja	TVE	Gloria	1 episode
2014	B&b, De Boca En Boca	Telecinco	Sira Lindo	1 episode
2015	Los Nuestros	Telecinco	Gloria	2 episodes
2015–16	Gym Tony	Cuatro	Deisy	216 episodes
2017	Centro Médico	TVE	Gloria	1 episode
2017	iFamily	TVE	Isa	8 episodes
2017	El Secreto De Puente Viejo	Antena 3	Lucía Torres	62 episodes
2017	Perdóname, Señor	Telecinco	Sibebi	4 episodes
2017	La Peluquería	TVE	Guadalupe "Lupe"	118 episodes
2018	Cupido	Playz	Venus	6 episodes
2018	El Continental	TVE	Julieta	10 episodes
2018	Wake Up	Playz	Deborah	6 episodes
2020	Kosta (The Paradise)	YLE	Limón	2 episodes
2021	Convecinos	Movistar Plus+	Isla	3 episodes
2022	El inmortal	Movistar Plus+	Perla	8 episodes

==== Non-fiction ====
Year	Show	Network	Role
	Tu Cara Me Suena	Antena 3	Dancer
2022	Benidorm Fest	TVE	Contestant (Winner)
2022	El Hormiguero	Antena 3	Guest
2022	Eurovision Song Contest	TVE	Spanish Contestant (3rd place)
2022	La Noche D	TVE	Guest
2023	¡Feliz 2023!	TVE	Performer
2023	Cover Night	TVE	Judge/Performer
2024	La Resistencia	Movistar Plus+	Guest/Performer
2025	La Revuelta	TVE	Guest/Performer
2025	That's My Jam: Que El Ritmo No Pare	TVE	Contestant
2025	Especial Navidad 2025	TVE	Performer
2026	Benidorm Fest	TVE	Performer

=== Music videos ===
Year	Title
2014	"Gigantes" (Note: Dancer in the music video by Ruth Lorenzo.)
2017	"Another Day of Sun" (Note: Spanish version of the song from the film La La Land.) (with Fran Coem)
2021	"México Mágico" (Note: As part of the original cast of Malinche El Musical by Nacho Cano.)
2021	"SloMo"
2022	"Toke"
2023	"Clavaíto" (with Abraham Mateo)
2023	"P.M."
2023	"Ping Pong" (with Ptazeta)
2023	"Loka" (with Maikel Delacalle)
2024	"Ahora Que No Te Tengo" (with FMK)
2025	"Una Bala"
2025	"Zakaza"
2025	"Matahari" (with Lapili)
2026	"Es Tan Fácil"

== Discography ==
=== Studio albums ===
List of studio albums, with selected details and chart positions
Title	Album details	Peaks
Title	Album details	SPA
¡Agua!	Released: 12 January 2024; Label: Sony Music Spain; Formats: CD, digital download, streaming, LP	1

=== Singles ===
==== As lead artist ====
Title	Year	Peak chart positions												Certifications	Album
Title	Year	SPA	CRO	GRE	ISL	IRE	LIT	NLD	POR	SWE	SWI	UK	WW	Certifications	Album
"SloMo"	2021	1	24	3	11	44	8	72	88	32	65	56	151	PROMUSICAE: 4× Platinum	¡Agua!
"Toke" (Note: Released in French as "Toke (Si t’es ok)".) (solo or remix with Ridsa)	2022	— (Note: "Toke" did not enter the Spanish Singles Chart, but peaked at number 14 on the Spanish Airplay Chart.)	—	—	—	—	—	—	—	—	—	—	—		Non-album single
"Clavaíto" (with Abraham Mateo)	2023	6	—	—	—	—	—	—	—	—	—	—	—	PROMUSICAE: 6× Platinum	¡Agua! and Insomnio
"P.M."	2023	—	—	—	—	—	—	—	—	—	—	—	—		¡Agua!
"Ping Pong" (with Ptazeta)	2023	90	—	—	—	—	—	—	—	—	—	—	—		¡Agua!
"Loka" (with Maikel Delacalle)	2023	—	—	—	—	—	—	—	—	—	—	—	—		¡Agua!
"Un Año Más" (Note: Cover version of the song with the same name by Mecano.)	2023	—	—	—	—	—	—	—	—	—	—	—	—		Non-album single
"Ahora Que No Te Tengo" (with FMK)	2024	—	—	—	—	—	—	—	—	—	—	—	—		¡Agua!
"Antillas"	2025	—	—	—	—	—	—	—	—	—	—	—	—		TBA
"Una Bala"	2025	—	—	—	—	—	—	—	—	—	—	—	—		TBA
"Zakaza"	2025	—	—	—	—	—	—	—	—	—	—	—	—		TBA
"Matahari" (with Lapili)	2025	—	—	—	—	—	—	—	—	—	—	—	—		TBA
"Es Tan Fácil"	2026	—	—	—	—	—	—	—	—	—	—	—	—		TBA
"UNOxUNO"	2026	—	—	—	—	—	—	—	—	—	—	—	—		TBA
"—" denotes releases that did not chart in that territory.

=== Promotional singles ===
Title	Year	Album
"La Estrella Azul"	2022	Pinocchio
"Aigua (Agua)"	2023	El Disc de La Marató 2023
"Agua"	2024	¡Agua!

=== Other appearances ===
Title	Year	Album
"Mentira" (Alberto Collado featuring Chanel Terrero)	2021	Non-album single
"México Mágico" (among Malinche cast)	2021	Non-album single

== Tours ==
Headlining

- ¡Agua! Summer Shows (2023)
- ¡Agua! Tour 2024 (2024)
- Tour 2025 (2025)
- Tour 2026 (2026)

== Awards and nominations ==
- As an actress, she has been nominated as part of the cast of the short film La Llorona by Ismael Olivares.

Award	Year	Recipient(s)	Category	Result	Ref.
Benidorm Fest	2022	"SloMo"	—N/a	Winner	
LOS40 Music Awards	2022	Herself	Best Spanish New Act	Nominated	
LOS40 Music Awards	2022	Herself	Del 40 Al 1 Award	Won	
LOS40 Music Awards	2023	"Clavaíto"	Best Spanish Song	Nominated	
LOS40 Music Awards	2023	"Clavaíto"	Best Spanish Collaboration	Won	
Academia De La Música De España	2024	"Clavaíto"	Best Pop Song	Nominated	
Premios Odeón	2024	"Clavaíto"	Video Of The Year	Won	

== Notes ==
Awards and achievements
Preceded by Debut entry	Benidorm Fest Winner; 2022	Succeeded by Blanca Paloma
Preceded by Blas Cantó with "Voy a quedarme"	Spain in the Eurovision Song Contest; 2022	Succeeded by Blanca Paloma with "Eaea"
