= Tony Grox =

Spanish producer and DJ

Background information
- Born: Antonio Ramírez Bernal; Cádiz, Spain
- Origin: Spain
- Genre: Electronic
- Occupations: Producer; DJ

Antonio Ramírez Bernal, also known as Tony Grox, is a Spanish DJ and producer. He won Benidorm Fest in 2026 alongside singer LUCYCALYS with the entry "T Amaré".

== Background ==
Grox is from Cádiz. He learnt how to play the electric guitar during his adolescence.

== Career ==
Grox launched his DJ career by becoming the first minor to perform a set at the "Ushuaïa Tower" in Ibiza. He also collaborated with DJ David Guetta. In 2017, he launched Vinicious Radio, a platform to promote new electronic music talent.

In 2022, Grox started the musical project "Tony G Tapes", in which he collaborated with Teo Lucadamo and Jedet. The "Tony G Tapes" featured cinematic elements. In 2025, he produced for Kiki Morente, José Rey, SALMA, Lachispa, and José del Curro. He participated in the production of "Buchi Fina", a song from Michelle Maciel's album Trastornado, which was nominated for "Best Mexican Contemporary Music Album at the Latin Grammys". He has worked across Latin America, the US and Europe. Through his travels, he worked with Juan Magán, Carlos Baute, Marta Sánchez, El Bugg, Dellafuente, Lucía Fernanda, and Sweet California.

In 2025, Grox was announced as a participant of Benidorm Fest 2026, as a part of a duo with singer LUCYCALYS. The duo participated with the entry "T Amaré" and placed first, with a total of 166 points in the Grand Final. They won the "Sirenita de Oro" trophy. They also won a Univision prize, where the duo received €100,000 and a trip to Miami to make music.

Following Benidorm Fest, Grox produced singles including "Con La Verdad" as himself, "Bohemia" as a collaboration with CURRO and "La Barrosa" for LUCYCALYS.

== Musical Style ==
Grox is known for his blend of urban and electronic music, which incorporate sounds of contemporary pop and flamenco.

Awards and achievements
Preceded by Melody	Benidorm Fest winner (with Lucycalys); 2026	Succeeded by TBD
