= Kenneth (singer) =

Venezuelan-born Spanish singer (born 2002)

- Born: Carlos Alfredo Colina Acevedo; 3 January 2002 (age 24); Venezuela
- Genres: Afrobeat, Afro-pop
- Occupation: Singer
- Instrument: Vocals
- Years active: 2014 – present

Carlos Alfredo Colina Acevedo (born 3 January 2002), known professionally as Kenneth, is a Venezuelan-Spanish singer. He is known for being a finalist in La Voz Kids (Spanish TV version) where he was a part of David Bisbal’s team and for his participation at Benidorm Fest 2026.

== Early Life & Background ==
Kenneth was born in Venezuela but moved to Asturias at the age of two. Following the move, he learnt how to speak Galician.

== Career ==
In 2014, Kenneth participated in La Voz Kids as a finalist on David Bisbal's team under the name "Carlos Alfredo". That same year, he went on two tours.

He also spent two years on '¡Qué tiempo tan feliz!', alongside María Teresa Campos.

He performed with Galician orchestras, including Combo Dominicana, Panorama City and Nueva Fuerza and Marbella.

In 2023, Kenneth launched his solo career, with releases including "Coraxxx", "200Km", and "Oh Mama".

Kenneth was a participant in Benidorm Fest 2026 with his entry "Los Ojos No Mienten". He qualified from the first semi final to the grand final and placed twelfth in a field of twelve finalists with forty points.

In June 2026, Kenneth released his debut album, Afro Pal Cora. The album features his Benidorm Fest entry and a collaboration with Italian artist Random.

== Style and influences ==
Kenneth performs afrobeat and afro-pop genres and takes influences from R&B, dancehall, urban music, reggaeton and electronic music.

== Discography ==
=== Singles ===
- "Coraxxx" (2023)
- "200Km" (2023)
- "Oh Mama" (2023)
- "Los Ojos No Mienten" (2025)
- "Favorita" (2026)
- "Pa' Qué Mentir" (2026)
- "La Vita" (with Random) (2026)

=== Albums ===
- Afro Pal Cora (2026)
