= Canarias =

Canarias may refer to:

- Canary Islands (Spanish: Islas Canarias), a Spanish autonomous community
  - Roman Catholic Diocese of Canarias
  - CB Canarias, a professional basketball team in Tenerife, Canary Islands
- Canarias class cruiser, a former class of heavy cruiser of the Spanish Navy
  - Spanish cruiser Canarias, in service 1936–1975
- Spanish frigate Canarias (F86), in service since 1995

== See also ==
- Canaria District, Víctor Fajardo province, Peru
- Syrnola canaria, a sea snail of family Pyramidellidae
- Trapania canaria, a sea slug of family Goniodorididae
