= Julia Medina (singer) =

Spanish singer

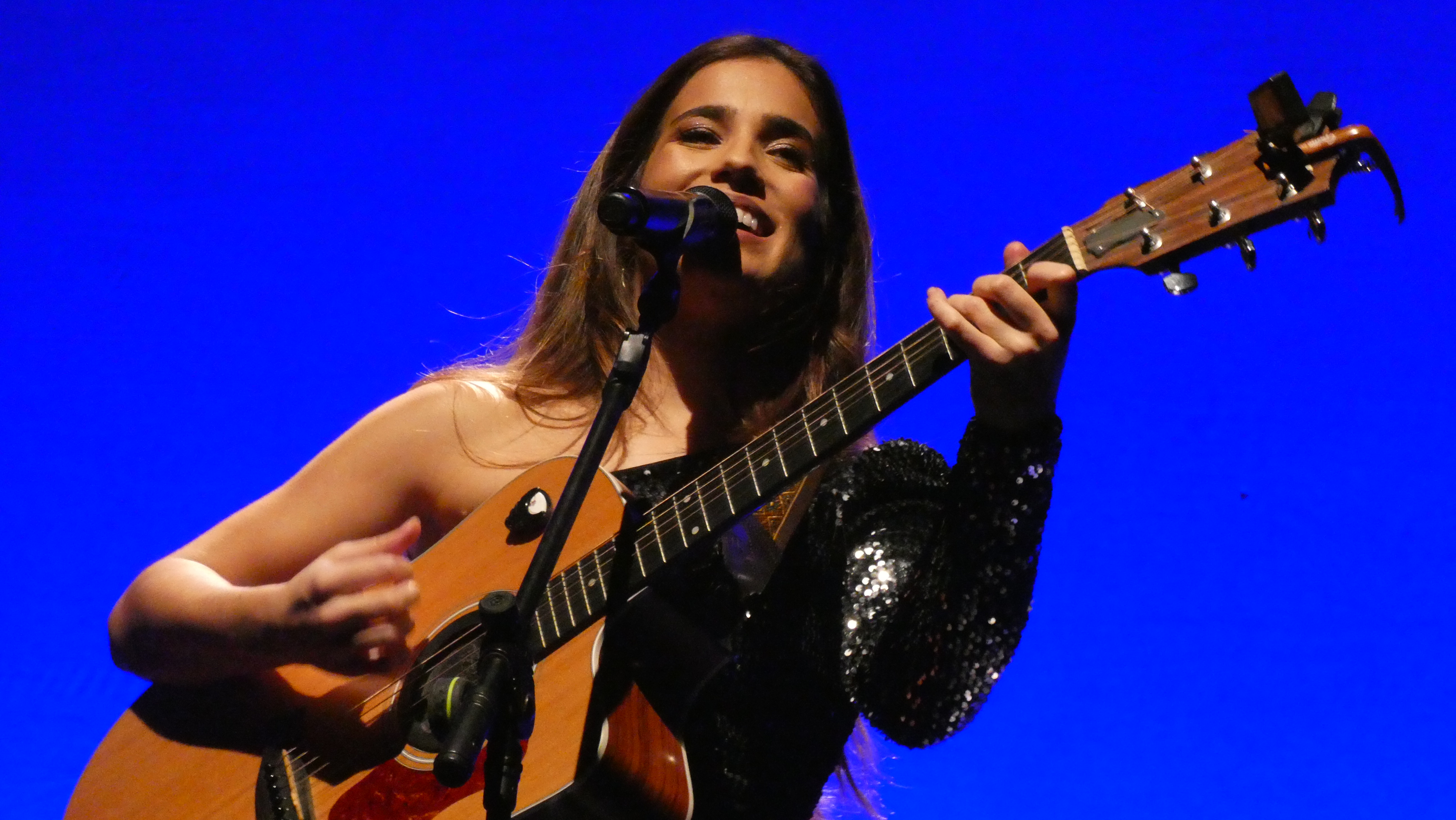
- Medina in 2020.

Background information
- Born: Julia Medina Martín; 27 November 1994 (age 31); San Fernando, Cádiz, Spain
- Genres: Pop
- Occupation: Singer
- Instruments: Voice, guitar
- Years active: 2018–present
- Label: Universal Music

Julia Medina Martín (born 27 November 1994) is a Spanish singer and songwriter.

== Career ==
Under the influence of her mother, a music teacher at a school in San Fernando, Medina began working with a parish choir in her home town at the age of 13, where she was the lead voice on numerous occasions. Later, she performed in bars.

Medina made a name for herself in 2018 with her participation in the Spanish TV talent show Operación Triunfo, where she reached the final and finished fifth. The compilation of her covers performed on the show reached number six in the weekly list of best-selling albums in Spain.

Following her success with Operación Triunfo, Medina signed a recording contract with Universal Music España, which enabled her to release her first album of previously unreleased songs, No dejo de bailar, in October of the following year. The album debuted at number three in the Spanish album charts. No dejo de bailar was followed by a tour of the same name, which included eleven concerts throughout Spain.

In 2021, she released her second studio album, Epicentro. In 2023, she took part in the music show Dúos increíbles.

In 2024, she released her EP Compañera de viaje and took part in the eleventh edition of the TV show Tu cara me suena, becoming the third finalist.

On October 9, 2025, Julia was announced as a participant of Benidorm Fest 2026 alongside Mexican singer María León. They performed with the entry "Las Damas Y El Vagabuno" and placed 8th in the final.

== Discography ==
=== Studio albums ===
- 2019 – No dejo de bailar
- 2021 – Epicentro

=== Compilations ===
- 2019 – Sus canciones

=== Singles ===
- 2019 – Dime
- 2020 - No me despedí
- 2020 - No hablan más de ti
- 2021 - Qué será de mí
- 2023 - Cara B
- 2023 - Adiós
- 2024 - Espacio

=== EP ===
- 2024 - Compañera de viaje

== Tours ==
- 2020 - Tour No dejo de bailar
- 2022 - Epicentro
