= Luna Ki =

Spanish singer (born 1999)

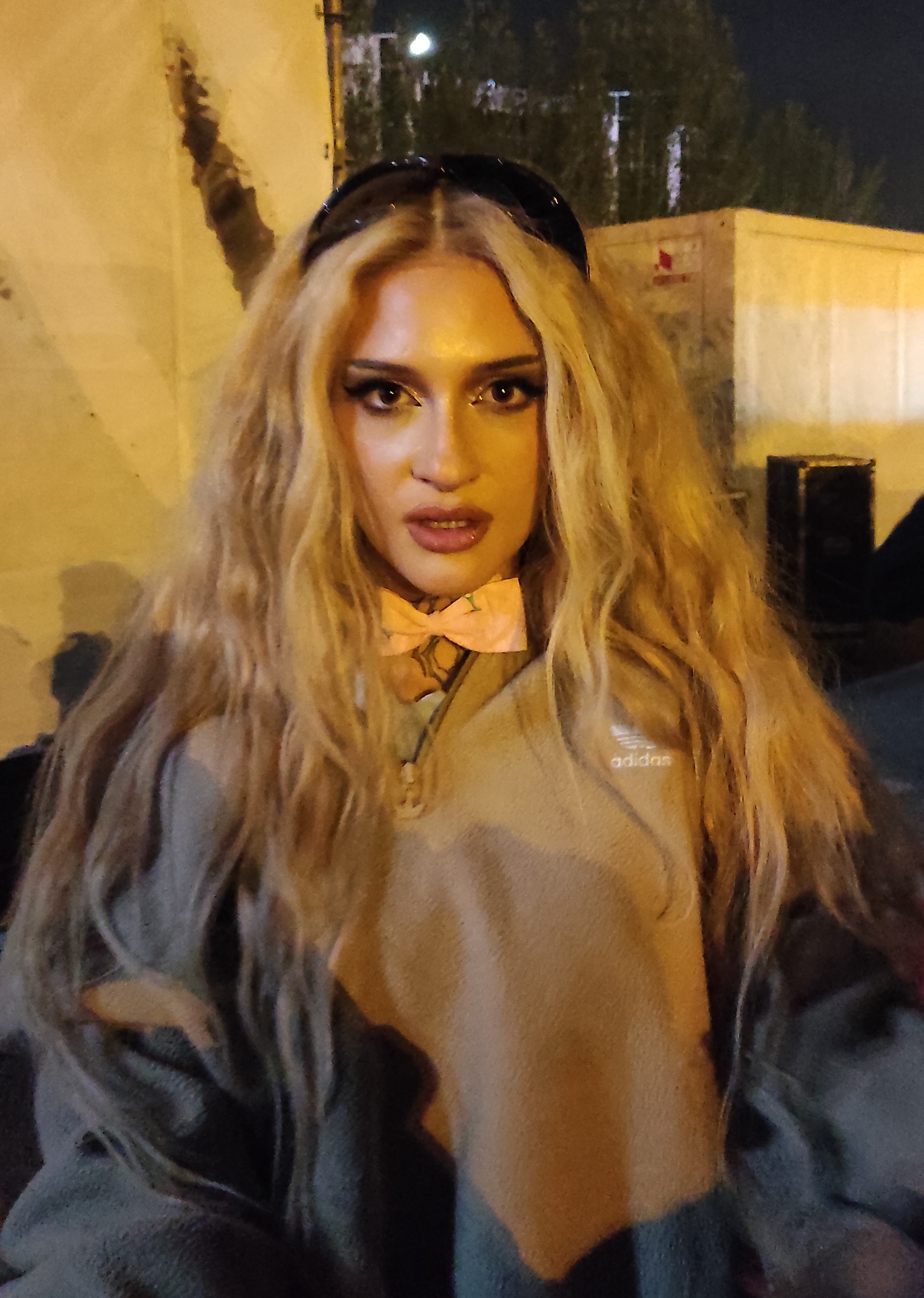

Background information
- Born: Luna Gorriz Vilá; 12 February 1999 (age 27); Barcelona, Spain
- Education: Massana School, Liceu Conservatory of Music
- Genres: Pop, Hyperpop
- Occupations: Singer; Composer
- Instrument: Vocals
- Years active: 2019–present

Luna Gorriz Vilá (born 11 February 1999), also known as Luna Zocolski or professionally as Luna Ki, is a non-binary Spanish pop singer who participated in Benidorm Fest twice.

== Early life and education ==
Ki was born in Barcelona, and is of Cuban descent. They developed an interest in music at a young age, and have a multidisciplinary background in areas such as theater, ballet, circus arts, sports, and writing. They completed their arts baccalaureate at the Massana School and also studied at the Liceu Conservatory of Music.

In 2018, they moved to Madrid to study fashion, working as a club DJ during this time.

== Career ==
Ki began releasing music in 2019 with the EP "Unknown, 2034", which featured "Septiembre". "Septiembre" gained traction on digital platforms and was certified gold by PROMUSICAE.

In 2021, they released their first album "CL34N". To launch the new album, Ki performed multiple concerts. They also organized an exhibition in Madrid to show their inspirations for "CL34N".

In 2022, Ki entered Benidorm Fest with the song "Voy A Morir". They were set to open the contest in the first semi final. Three days before the semi final was set to take place, they announced their withdrawal from the competition due to Eurovision’s regulations regarding auto-tune, saying the song would not work the same without the tool.

In 2026, they participated again with "Bomba De Amor". They described the song as a new beginning in their career. Following their performance, Ki suffered an anxiety attack which required them to leave the venue during the qualifier announcements. Ki ended up receiving 68 points in total, placing 7th in the Second Semi Final.

In April 2026, Ki released their second album "LUNA", which featured "Bomba De Amor".

== Style and influences ==
Ki has cited artists like Michael Jackson, Lady Gaga, Lenny Kravitz, Gwen Stefani, Riff Raff, Ivy Queen and Shakira as influences for their music. They have lyric which mention LGBTQIA+ rights and mental health. Their music videos feature futuristic aesthetics.

== Discography ==
=== Singles ===
- "Septiembre" (2019)
- "Disney" (2021)
- "FAKE" (2021)
- "Putón" (2021)
- "Voy a Morrir" (2022)
- "Soy No Diosa" (2025)
- "Bomba De Amor" (2025)

=== EPs ===
- "Unknown, 2034" (2019)

=== Albums ===
- "CL34N" (2022)
- "LUNA" (2026)
