= Maggie Szabo =

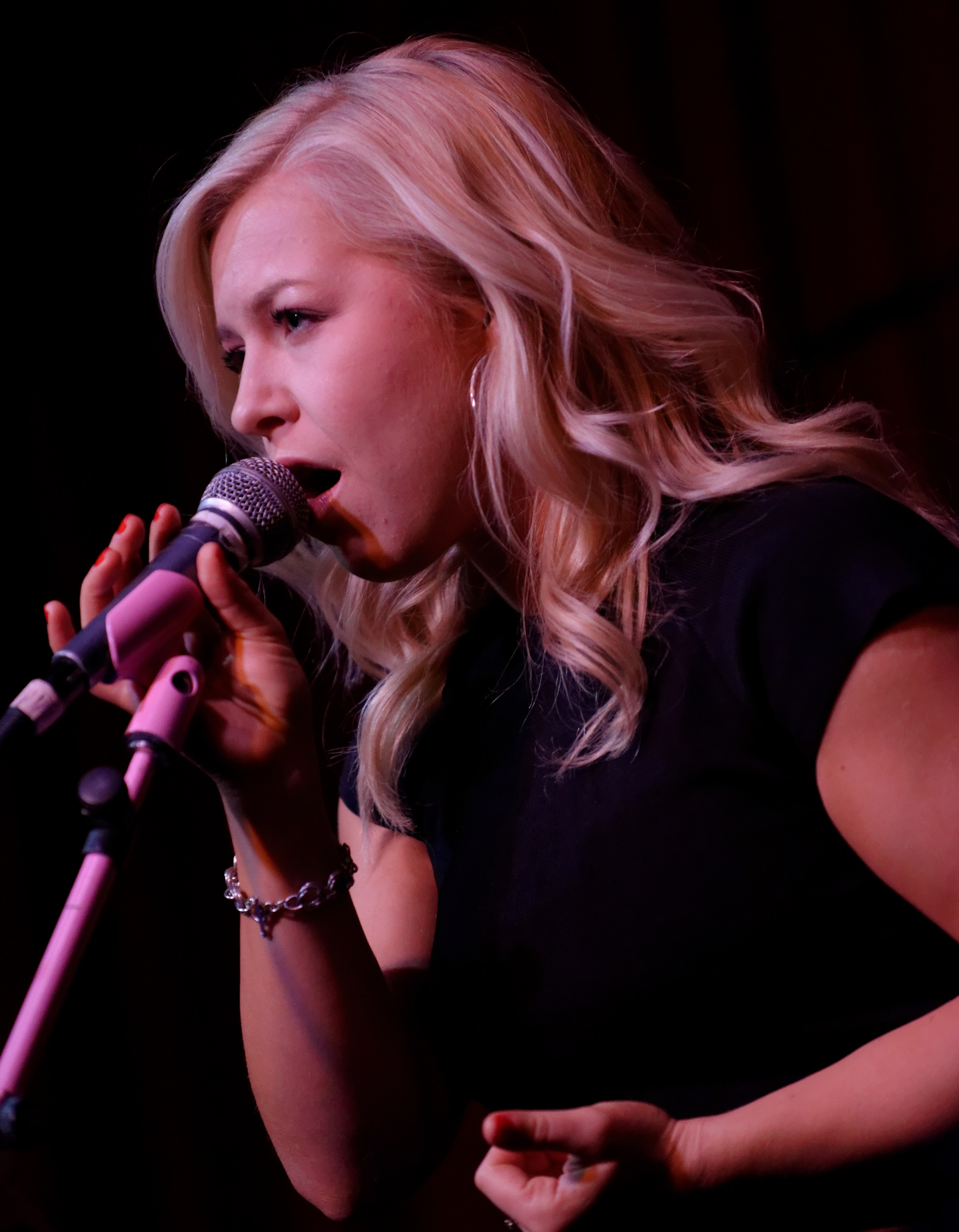
- Maggie Szabo performing in 2014

Background information
- Born: Marguerite Szabo; Hamilton, Ontario, Canada
- Genres: Soul, pop
- Years active: 2008–present
- Labels: Linus Entertainment; E1 Music
- Website: allaboutmaggie.com

Maggie Szabo is a Canadian singer and songwriter. Originally from Ontario, she spent some years in Nashville, Tennessee as a young artist before relocating to Los Angeles in 2013. From her origins in pop and soul, she has also performed on a number of occasions as a guest vocalist on electronic music tracks. Her work is also often featured in film and television soundtracks, and has appeared on most major US networks.

== Early life and education ==
Szabo was born in Hamilton, Ontario, and grew up in Dundas, Ontario, where she attended Highland Secondary School. As a young child she was a fan of the Spice Girls and Destiny's Child, and received early inspiration to become a songwriter from Carole King's Tapestry. She also played in a jazz band and sang the national anthem at local sporting events.

After high school, she moved to Nashville, Tennessee, to pursue her music career, with financial assistance from her parents. She had her first exposure performing cover versions on YouTube, including a collaboration with Walk Off The Earth for their cover of "Party Rock Anthem", which was viewed over 9 million times. After releasing her debut album, the music videos for Szabo's original songs began going viral on YouTube.

== Career ==
Szabo signed a record deal with Linus Entertainment in Ontario, and in November 2012, she released her debut pop album Now Hear Me Out on True North Records. Szabo co-wrote all original songs on the album with production by Justin Gray, Gavin Bradley, and Tanya Leah.

Szabo moved to Los Angeles in 2013, where she performed at the Viper Room, House of Blues, and the Hotel Café. Szabo's track "Tidal Waves and Hurricanes" was premiered exclusively by Ryan Seacrest in 2014, and she won the 2014 Toronto Independent Music Awards in the Best Pop category.

In 2016, Szabo's songs appeared on the TV shows Criminal Minds ("Hushabye Mountain") and Stuck in the Middle ("Living the Life"), and her track "Forgive and Forget" was shared on Tidal.

She was a featured vocalist on the album Future by German electronic DJ Schiller in March 2016, the first of several collaborations with electronic music producers.

Her single "Don't Give Up", taken from her Worthy EP, premiered on Billboard on 19 September 2017. The track was dedicated to transsexual young people, with part of the proceeds donated to the Ali Forney Center. She performed the song with the Trans Chorus of Los Angeles in June 2018 at Los Angeles Pride festival.

Her song "Love Is Free" was chosen by Jennifer Hudson as the song for her artist, Kennedy Holmes, on the season 15 finale of The Voice on NBC in 2018. Her track "Home", released the same year with DJ Madison Mars, reached the top 40 on the Billboard Charts.

Szabo writes extensively for film and television. Her music has been featured on film and TV projects for networks including Netflix, Disney, ABC, E!, and NBC.

== Awards and nominations ==
In 2014, Szabo was nominated "Best Pop" for the Toronto Independent Music Awards. She was also voted as the Top 5 most voted for US artists by the BalconyTV in 2014.

== Discography ==
=== Studio albums ===
| Title | Album details |
|---|---|
| Now Hear Me Out | Released: November 2012; Label: Linus Entertainment / E1 Music; Formats: CD |

=== As featured artist ===
| Song title | Album |
|---|---|
| "Something There" | Title: Future (Super Deluxe Edition); Artist: Schiller; Released: March 2016; Label: Sleepingroom / Universal Music Group Gmbh; Formats: CD, vinyl |
