= List of The Boulet Brothers' Dragula contestants =

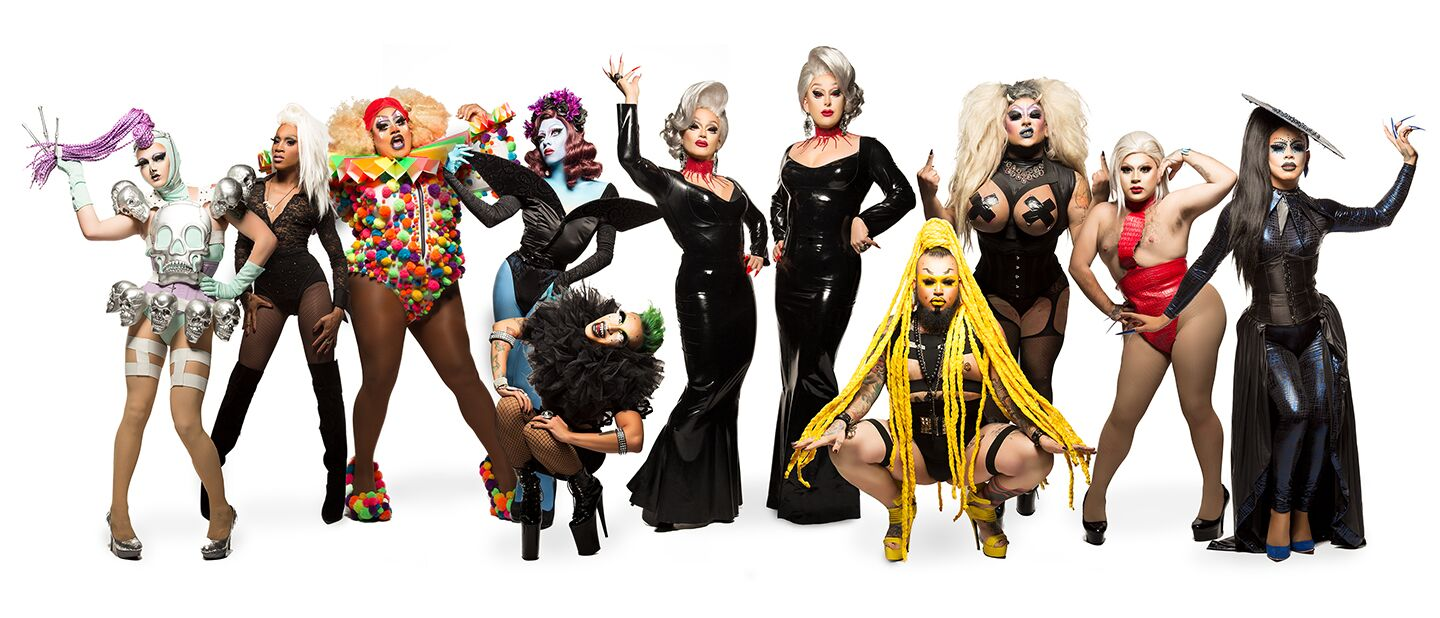
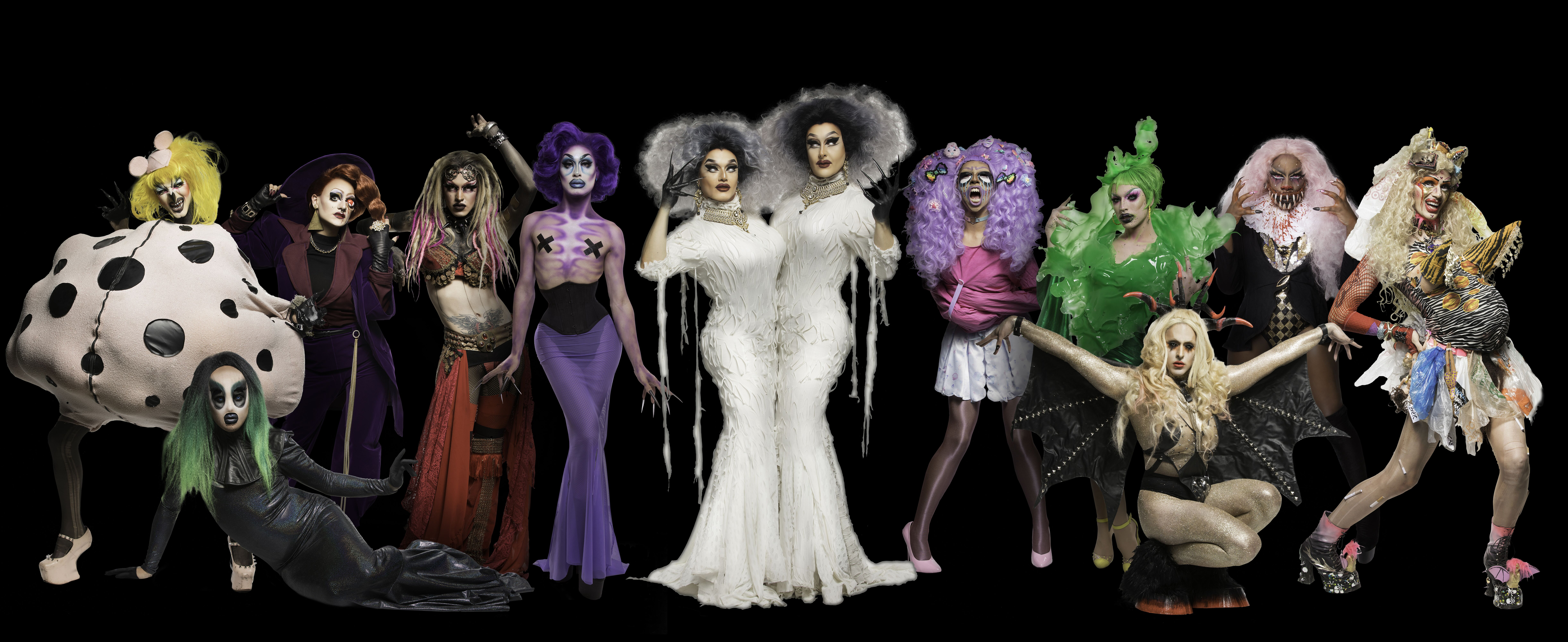
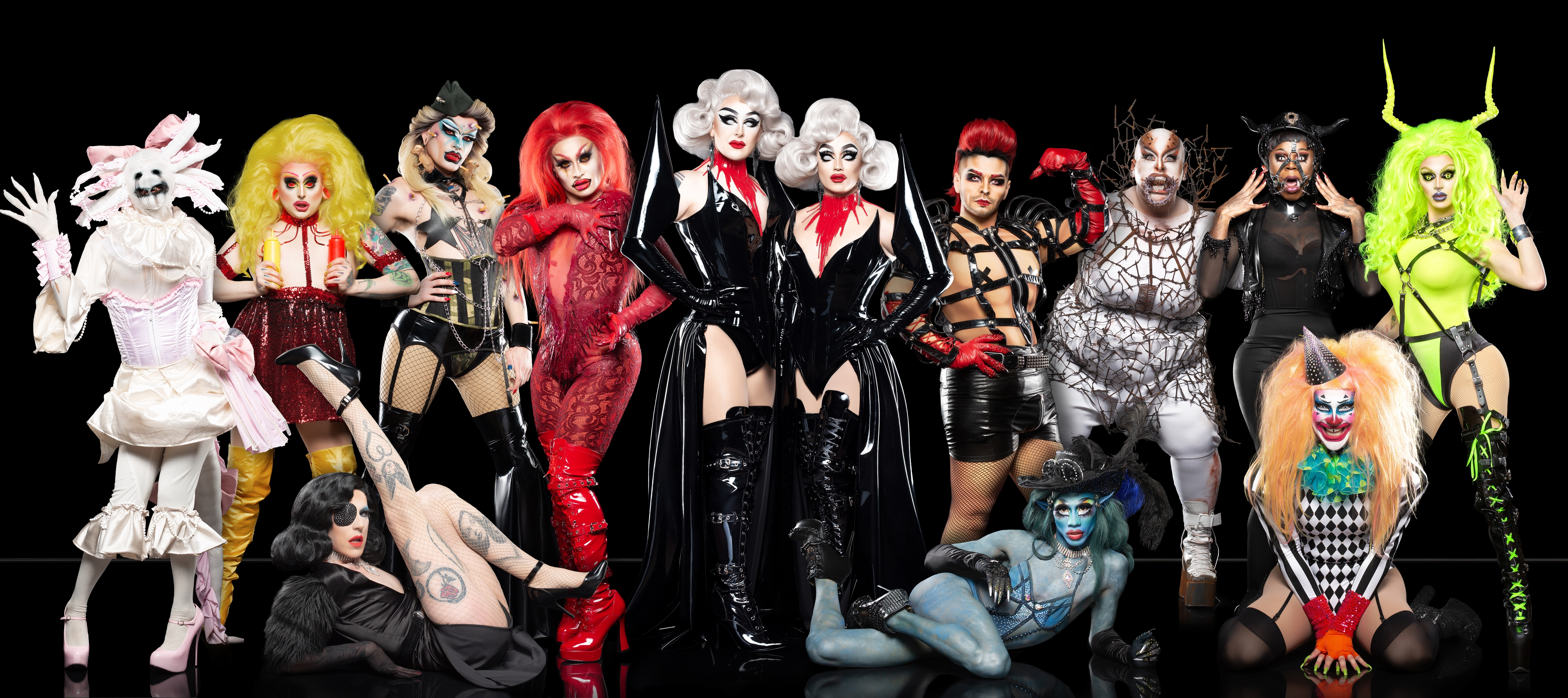
The Boulet Brothers and the cast of the first, second, and third seasons.

The Boulet Brothers' Dragula is an American reality competition television series where drag artists the Boulet Brothers, are co-hosts and head judges, and are in search of the "Next Drag Supermonster" for the planet Earth. The series first broadcast in 2016, and six complete seasons have aired. During each season, drag performers apply to compete against each other and based on the critiques from the judges, they are progressively eliminated contest until only a few contenders remain. The selected finalists participate in a finale episode from which a winner is determined.

Since its sixth season, 62 contestants have competed. The six winners of the series, in chronological order, are Vander Von Odd, Biqtch Puddin', Landon Cider, Dahli, Niohuru X, and Asia Consent.

== Main series ==
Legend:

The contestant won the season, episode, or special.
The contestant returned to the competition after being eliminated during the season.
The contestant returned to the competition after being eliminated in a previous season.

Contestants of The Boulet Brothers' Dragula and their backgrounds
Season	Contestant	Hometown	Outcome
1
1	Vander Von Odd	Los Angeles, California	Winner
1	Frankie Doom	Los Angeles, California	Runners-up
1	Melissa Befierce	Los Angeles, California	Runners-up
1	Meatball	Los Angeles, California	4th place
1	Loris (Note: Loris Volkle is referred to as Loris on the show.)	Los Angeles, California	5th place
1	Xochi Mochi	Los Angeles, California	5th place
1	Foxie Adjuia	Los Angeles, California	7th place
1	Ursula Major	Los Angeles, California	8th place
1	Pinche Queen	Los Angeles, California	9th place
2		Los Angeles, California	
2	Biqtch Puddin'	Atlanta, Georgia	Winner
2	James Majesty (Note: Now Majesty, they were referred to as James Majesty on season 2.)	Seattle, Washington	Runners-up
2	Victoria Elizabeth Black (Note: Victoria Elizabeth Black is referred to by her full name on season 2 and as Victoria Black on Resurrection and Titans season 1.)	Orlando, Florida	Runners-up
2	Abhora	Miami, Florida	4th place
2	Disasterina	Los Angeles, California	5th place
2	Erika Klash	San Francisco, California	6th place
2	Dahli (Note: The Dahli is referred to as Dahli on the show.)	Phoenix, Arizona	7th place
2	Kendra Onixxx	Pomona, California	8th place
2	Monikkie Shame	Seattle, Washington	9th place
2	Felony Dodger	Los Angeles, California	10th place
3
3	Landon Cider	Long Beach, California	Winner
3	Dollya Black	Orlando, Florida	Runners-up
3	Priscilla Chambers	Asheville, North Carolina	Runners-up
3	Louisianna Purchase	Austin, Texas	4th place
3	Evah Destruction	Dallas, Texas	5th place
3	Maddelynn Hatter	New York City, New York	6th place
3	Hollow Eve (Note: Hollow Eve of Destruction is referred to as Hollow Eve on the show.)	San Francisco, California	7th place
3	Maxi Glamour	St. Louis, Missouri	8th place
3	Yovska	Toronto, Canada	9th place
3	St. Lucia (Note: Now Saint, she is referred to as St. Lucia on season 3.)	Atlanta, Georgia	10th place
3	Violencia! (Note: Violencia Exclamation Point is referred to as Violencia! on the show.)	Boston, Massachusetts	11th place (Note: Violencia! quit the competition before the extermination.)
4
4	Dahli (Note: The contestant returned to compete after being eliminated on a previous season.) (Note: Dahli entered the competition on episode 2.)	Phoenix, Arizona	Winner
4	HoSo Terra Toma	Seoul, South Korea	Runners-up
4	Saint	New York City, New York	Runners-up
4	Sigourney Beaver	Chicago, Illinois	Runners-up
4	La Zavaleta	New York City, New York	5th place
4	Jade Jolie	Louisville, Kentucky	6th place
4	Bitter Betty	Los Angeles, California	7th place
4	Merrie Cherry	New York City, New York	8th place
4	Koco Caine	Tulsa, Oklahoma	9th place
4	Astrud Aurelia	Phoenix, Arizona	10th place
4	Formelda Hyde	Phoenix, Arizona	11th place
5
5	Niohuru X	Tianjin, China	Winner
5	Blackberri	Houston, Texas	Runners-up
5	Orkgotik	Buenos Aires, Argentina	Runners-up
5	Throb Zombie	Boston, Massachusetts	Runners-up
5	Fantasia Royale Gaga	Miami, Florida	5th place
5	Cynthia Doll	Kansas City, Missouri	6th place
5	Jay Kay	New York City, New York	7th place (Note: Jay Kay originally placed eleventh before re-entering the competition.)
5	Anna Phylactic	Manchester, United Kingdom	8th place
5	Jarvis Hammer	Atlanta, Georgia	9th place
5	Satanna	Los Angeles, California	10th place
5	Onyx Ondyx	Philadelphia, Pennsylvania	11th place
6
6	Asia Consent	Portland, Oregon	Winner
6	Auntie Heroine	Rockford, Illinois	Runners-up
6	Grey Matter	Houston, Texas	Runners-up
6	Yuri (Note: Yuri Guaii is referred to as Yuri on the show.)	Auckland, New Zealand	4th place
6	Pi	Philadelphia, Pennsylvania	5th place
6	Jaharia	Kansas City, Missouri	6th place
6	Aurora Gozmic	Chicago, Illinois	7th place
6	Vivvi The Force	San Diego, California	8th place
6	Majesty	Portland, Oregon	9th place (Note: Majesty quit the competition, volunteering to have themself eliminated over the two drag artists in the bottom.)
6	Desiree Dik	Washington, D.C.	10th place
6	Scylla (Note: Scylla Kone is referred to as Scylla on the show.)	Chicago, Illinois	11th place
6	Severity Stone	Boston, Massachusetts	12th place

== Spin-offs ==
Legend:

The contestant won the season, episode, or special.
The contestant returned to the competition after being eliminated during the season.

=== Resurrection ===
Contestants of The Boulet Brothers' Dragula: Resurrection and their backgrounds
Season	Contestant	Hometown	Original season(s)	Original placement(s)	Outcome
1
1	Saint	Acworth, Georgia	Season 3	10th place	Winner
1	Dahli	Phoenix, Arizona	Season 2	7th place	Runner-up (Note: After being exterminated by the Boulets Dahli was shown to have survived.)
1	Victoria Black	Orlando, Florida	Season 2	Runner-up	3rd place (Note: Victoria Black quit the competition prior to the final judging.)
1	Frankie Doom	West Covina, California	Season 1	Runner-up	4th place
1	Kendra Onixxx	Riverside, California	Season 2	8th place	4th place
1	Loris	Los Angeles, California	Season 1	5th place	4th place
1	Priscilla Chambers	Asheville, North Carolina	Season 3	Runner-up	4th place

=== Titans ===
Contestants of The Boulet Brothers' Dragula: Titans and their backgrounds
Season	Contestant	Hometown	Original season(s)	Original placement(s)	Outcome
1
1	Victoria Black	Orlando, Florida	Season 2	Runner-up	Winner
1	Victoria Black	Orlando, Florida	Resurrection	3rd place	Winner
1	HoSo Terra Toma	Seoul, South Korea	Season 4	Runner-up	Runners-up
1	Koco Caine	Phoenix, Arizona	Season 4	9th place	Runners-up
1	Astrud Aurelia	Phoenix, Arizona	Season 4	10th place	4th place
1	Evah Destruction	Austin, Texas	Season 3	5th place	4th place
1	Melissa Befierce	Los Angeles, California	Season 1	Runner-up	6th place (Note: Melissa Befierce decided to quit the competition after being placed into the bottom two and was ultimately exterminated by the Boulets.)
1	Abhora	Los Angeles, California	Season 2	4th place	7th place (Note: Abhora originally placed tenth, but re-entered the competition and ultimately placed seventh.)
1	Erika Klash	New York City, New York	Season 2	6th place	8th place
1	Kendra Onixxx	Riverside, California	Season 2	8th place	9th place
1	Kendra Onixxx	Riverside, California	Resurrection	4th place	9th place
1	Yovska	Toronto, Canada	Season 3	9th place	10th place
2
2	Evah Destruction	Austin, Texas	Season 3	5th place	Winner
2	Evah Destruction	Austin, Texas	Titans 1	4th place	Winner
2	Abhora	Los Angeles, California	Season 2	4th place	Runner-up
2	Abhora	Los Angeles, California	Titans 1	7th place	Runner-up
2	Jaharia	Kansas City, Missouri	Season 6	6th place	Runner-up (Note: Jaharia originally placed fourth, but re-entered the competition after winning the last round of the Hellbound Showdown.)
2	Jay Kay	Brooklyn, New York	Season 5	7th place	Runner-up
2	Cynthia Doll	Kansas City, Missouri	Season 5	6th place	5th place
2	Sigourney Beaver	Chicago, Illinois	Season 4	Runner-up	6th place
2	Blackberri	Houston, Texas	Season 5	Runner-up	7th place
2	Disasterina	Los Angeles, California	Season 2	5th place	8th place
2	Priscilla Chambers	Asheville, North Carolina	Season 3	Runner-up	8th place
2	Priscilla Chambers	Asheville, North Carolina	Resurrection	4th place	8th place
2	Dollya Black	Orlando, Florida	Season 3	Runner-up	10th place
2	La Zavaleta	Mexico City, Mexico	Season 4	5th place	Disqualified (Note: La Zavaleta was disqualified from the competition after participating in the extermination challenge.)
2	Jade Jolie	Gainesville, Florida	Season 4	6th place	Disqualified (Note: Jade Jolie was disqualified from the competition after being exterminated and participating in two rounds of the Hellbound Showdown.)
2	Loris	Los Angeles, California	Season 1	5th place	13th place
2	Loris	Los Angeles, California	Resurrection	4th place	13th place
2	Frankie Doom	Anchorage, Alaska	Season 1	Runner-up	14th place
2	Frankie Doom	Anchorage, Alaska	Resurrection	4th place	14th place

== See also ==
- List of drag kings
- List of drag queens
