= Melissa Befierce =

American drag performer

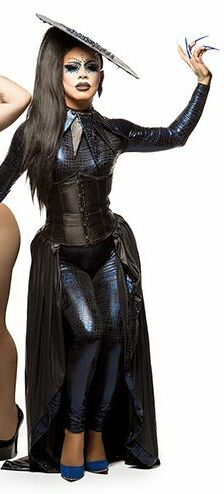
- Melissa Befierce in promotional artwork for season 1 of The Boulet Brothers' Dragula, 2016
- Born: Alfredo Salinas
- Occupation: Drag performer
- Television: The Boulet Brothers' Dragula; The Boulet Brothers' Dragula: Titans

Melissa Befierce is the stage name of Alfredo Salinas, an American drag performer best known for competing on the first season of The Boulet Brothers' Dragula and the first season of The Boulet Brothers' Dragula: Titans.

== Career ==
Melissa Befierce's first drag performance was made at Arena Nightclub at the age of 23. Her original stage name was "Phoenix". She appeared in MOXXI's music video "Ransom" in 2014, and was featured on Velo's single "Perra" in 2018.

In 2016, Melissa Befierce was announced to be part of the inaugural cast of The Boulet Brothers' Dragula. She ultimately placed as a runner-up alongside Frankie Doom against Vander Von Odd. In 2022, she returned to compete on the first season of The Boulet Brothers' Dragula: Titans, placing sixth. That same year, Melissa Befierce appeared while dressed as Selena Quintanilla as part of a tribute to Jennifer Lopez at the 2022 iHeartRadio Music Awards. (Note: Lopez portrayed Quintanilla in the 1997 biographical film Selena.)

== Personal life ==
Salinas is of Latin American descent and is based in South Central Los Angeles, California, where she grew up. He has cited Marilyn Monroe as an artistic inspiration. Salinas uses he/him and she/her pronouns.

== Filmography ==
- The Boulet Brothers' Dragula
- The Boulet Brothers' Dragula: Titans
