= Astrud Aurelia =

American drag performer

- Born: Marcus Samuel Leatham; Phoenix, Arizona, USA
- Other name: Astrud Elizabeth Aurelia
- Occupations: Drag performer, musician
- Known for: The Boulet Brothers' Dragula (season 4); The Boulet Brothers' Dragula: Titans (season 1)

Astrud Aurelia is the stage name of Marcus Samuel Leatham, an American drag performer, singer, and musician who competed on the fourth season of The Boulet Brothers' Dragula and the first season of The Boulet Brothers' Dragula: Titans.

== Early life and career ==
Leatham was born in Phoenix, Arizona and studied musical theater at the Arizona School for the Arts from eighth grade onwards. They began playing the violin and cello in high school, and later attended Arizona State University as a drummer before switching again to the double bass.

Leatham's drag persona is Astrud Aurelia. Their "drag mother" is fellow Dragula alum Dahli.

In July 2025, Astrud Aurelia began touring with California-based musical project Steam Powered Giraffe as the band's percussionist.

== Personal life ==
Leatham's father was a musician. They have cited their drag influences to be Sasha Velour, Vander Von Odd, Naomi Smalls and Evah Destruction, and their musical influences to be David Bowie, St. Vincent, Nina Hagen, Frank Ocean, Ornette Coleman, John Coltrane, Chick Corea, Archie Shepp, and Esperanza Spalding. They identify as genderqueer.

Formerly based in Phoenix, Arizona and New York, New York, they are now living in Los Angeles, California.

== Discography ==
=== Singles ===
- "Aliens" (2024)
- "Hotel (Exit)" (2024)
- "Prey" (2025)

== See also ==
- List of Arizona State University alumni
