= The Boulet Brothers' Dragula: Titans season 1 =

Sixth season of 'The Boulet Brothers' Dragula'

The Boulet Brothers' Dragula: Titans
- Season 1
- Promotional poster for season one
- Hosted by: The Boulet Brothers
- Judges: Dracmorda Boulet; Swanthula Boulet
- No. of contestants: 10
- Winner: Victoria Black
- Runners-up: HoSo Terra Toma; Koco Caine
- Exorsister: Koco Caine
- No. of episodes: 9

Release
- Original network: Shudder (United States)
- Original release: 25 October – 19 December 2022

Season chronology
- Next → Season 2

The first season of The Boulet Brothers' Dragula: Titans aired from October, 25, 2022, and concluded on December 19, 2022, broadcast on Shudder, featuring 10 past contestants from that series returning to compete for the title of World's Next Drag Supermonster and a cash prize of $100,000.

The winner of the first season of The Boulet Brothers' Dragula: Titans was Victoria Black, with HoSo Terra Toma and Koco Caine as the runners-up.

== Contestants ==
Contestants of The Boulet Brothers' Dragula: Titans season 1 and their backgrounds
Contestant	Age	Hometown	Original season(s)	Original placement(s)	Outcome
Victoria Black (Note: Victoria Elizabeth Black is referred to as Victoria Black on the show.)	27	Orlando, Florida	Season 2	Runner-up	Winner
Victoria Black	27	Orlando, Florida	Resurrection	3rd place	Winner
HoSo Terra Toma	20	Seoul, South Korea	Season 4	Runner-up	Runners-up
Koco Caine	27	Phoenix, Arizona	Season 4	9th place	Runners-up
Astrud Aurelia	25	Phoenix, Arizona	Season 4	10th place	4th place
Evah Destruction	30	Austin, Texas	Season 3	5th place	4th place
Melissa Befierce	38	Los Angeles, California	Season 1	Runner-up	6th place (Note: Melissa Befierce decided to quit the competition after being placed into the bottom two and was ultimately exterminated by the Boulets.)
Abhora	32	Los Angeles, California	Season 2	4th place	7th place (Note: Abhora originally placed tenth, but re-entered the competition and ultimately placed seventh.)
Erika Klash	38	New York City, New York	Season 2	6th place	8th place
Kendra Onixxx	37	Riverside, California	Season 2	8th place	9th place
Kendra Onixxx	37	Riverside, California	Resurrection	4th place	9th place
Yovska	27	Toronto, Canada	Season 3	9th place	10th place

== Contestant progress ==
Legend:

Victoria Black won The Boulet Brothers' Dragula: Titans season 1.
HoSo Terra Toma and Koco Caine were the runners-up.
WIN indicates that the contestant won the challenge.
SAFE indicates that the contestant was declared safe by the judges.
BTM (Bottom) indicates that the contestant was up for extermination.
QUIT indicates that Melissa Befierce quit the competition.
EXT (Exterminated) indicates that the contestant was exterminated.

Contestants progress with placements in each episode
Contestant	Episode								
Contestant	1	2	3	4	5	6	7	8	9
Victoria Black	WIN	SAFE	WIN	BTM	WIN	SAFE	SAFE	BTM	Winner
HoSo Terra Toma	SAFE	SAFE	WIN	SAFE	SAFE	BTM	SAFE	WIN	Runner-up
Koco Caine	SAFE	SAFE	SAFE	WIN	SAFE	SAFE	BTM	BTM	Runner-up
Astrud Aurelia	SAFE	SAFE	SAFE	SAFE	BTM	SAFE	SAFE	EXT	
Evah Destruction	SAFE	WIN	SAFE	SAFE	SAFE	BTM	WIN	EXT	
Melissa Befierce	SAFE	SAFE	SAFE	SAFE	SAFE	WIN	QUIT		
Abhora	EXT	SAFE	BTM	SAFE	EXT				
Erika Klash	BTM	SAFE	SAFE	EXT					
Kendra Onixxx	SAFE	BTM	EXT						
Yovska	SAFE	EXT							

== Guest judges ==
Episode	Guest Judges
1	Cassandra Peterson, actress, writer, and singer; known for her portrayal of the character Elvira, Mistress of the Dark; Justin Simien, filmmaker, actor, and author; known for directing Dear White People
2	Bonnie Aarons, actress and writer; best known for her portrayal of Valak in The Nun; Darren Stein, director and screenwriter; best known for the movie Jawbreaker and for producing Dragula: Titans
3	Alaska Thunderfuck 5000, drag queen and singer; best known for competing in season 5 of RuPaul's Drag Race and winning season 2 of RuPaul's Drag Race All Stars; David Dastmalchian, actor best known for his roles in Ant-Man and The Suicide Squad
4	Eric Graise, is a singer, actor, dancer best known for their role in Queer as Folk; Misha Osherovich is an American actor, filmmaker, and activist, known for their role in the film Freaky.
5	Barbara Crampton, actress known for her roles in Into the Dark and Creepshow; Tananarive Due, horror author and educator
6	Katya, drag queen; best known for competing in season 7 of RuPaul's Drag Race and season 2 of RuPaul's Drag Race All Stars; Poppy, singer, YouTuber and performance artist
7	Dahli, winner of Dragula season 4, runner-up of Dragula: Resurrection, and contestant on Dragula season 2 Saint, runner-up of Dragula season 4, winner of Dragula: Resurrection, and contestant on Dragula season 3
8	Harvey Guillén, actor; known for his role on What We Do in the Shadows; Joe Bob Briggs, film critic and TV host

== Episode summary ==
Episode	Title	Original airdate	Episode summary
1	Halloween House Party	October 25, 2022	Fright Feat Challenge (Bobbing for Apples): Bob all of the apples in a cauldron full of blood and guts. Fright Feat Prize: The power to choose the roles for the floorshow lip-sync Fright Feat Winner: Melissa Befierce Floor Show Challenge (Halloween House Party Lip-sync Challenge): Choose a traditional American Halloween costume to re-invent it in your own style, and then present it as part of a Halloween House Party themed lip-sync performance with group choreography to the song "I Was a Teenage Monster" by the Keytones. This challenge was inspired by Dragula Season 3 Episode 8: "Halloween Haunt".: Abhora chose ???; Astrud Aurelia chose the Creature from the Black Lagoon; Erika Klash chose a Bat; Evah Destruction chose the Devil; HoSo Terra Toma chose a Pirate; Kendra Onixxx chose Frankenstein; Koco Caine chose a Mummy; Melissa Befierce chose a Vampire; Victoria Black chose a Pumpkinhead; Yovska also chose a Pumpkinhead; Floor Show Winner: Victoria Black Bottom 2 chosen by contestants: Abhora and Erika Klash; Exterminated: Abhora
2	Revenge of the Witch	November 1, 2022	Returned: Abhora Fright Feat Challenge (Witch Trial): Eat all the food which gets progressively spicier until the last Monster remains. Fright Feat Prize: The power to curse another Monster with the "Curse of Baldness", which forbids the cursed competitor to use a wig or headpiece in the floorshow. Fright Feat Winner: Erika Klash; Cursed: Abhora Floor Show Challenge (Revenge of the Witch Floorshow): Create and present an original witch look inspired by the witches from all over world, including a custom embellished and designed pair of shoes to go with the look, and then present it with a lip-sync performance to the song "Shoes" by Kelly. This challenge was inspired by Dragula Season 1 Episode 1: "Wickedest Witch". Floor Show Winner: Evah Destruction; Floor Show Prize: A $1000 shopping spree of shoes and boots courtesy of Fierce Shoes Bottom 2 chosen by the Boulets: Kendra Onixxx and Yovska; Exterminated: Yovska
3	Science-Fiction (Horror) Double Feature	November 8, 2022	Fright Feat Challenge (The Graviton Vomitorium): Survive a Graviton Simulator without getting sick for 3 minutes. Fright Feat Winner: Everyone Floor Show Challenge (Science Fiction Horror Double Feature): Create and present a look inspired by the combination of horror and science fiction and present your look on the floorshow. This challenge was inspired by Dragula Season 2 Episode 4: "Sci-Fi Babes". Floor Show Winner: HoSo Terra Toma and Victoria Black Bottom 2 chosen by the Boulets: Abhora and Kendra Onixxx; Exterminated: Kendra Onixxx
4	Dungeons and Drag Queens Two: Into the Underdark	November 15, 2022	Fright Feat Challenge (Tug of Gore): Split in teams of two, the queens must win a game of tug-of-war and not fall into a pit full of dirty, bloody, water. Fright Feat Winner: Astrud Aurelia, Erika Klash, Melissa Befierce and Victoria Black; Fright Feat Prize: The power to choose which scene each team will act out in. Floor Show Challenge (Dungeons and Drag Queens Two: Into the Underdark): Firstly, create a look based on the race and class assigned by the Boulets. Then, they must model their looks on location and also act in a short campaign in the Underdark Labyrinth. This challenge was inspired by Dragula Season 3's Episode 4, Dungeons and Drag Queens.: Abhora was given Dark Elf Druid; Astrud Aurelia was given Human Bard; Erika Klash was given Gnome Rogue; Evah Destruction was given Human Paladin; HoSo Terra Toma was given Dark Elf Ranger; Koco Caine was given Elf Barbarian; Melissa Befierce was given Human Barbarian; Victoria Black was given Elf Priestess; Floor Show Winner: Koco Caine Bottom 2 chosen by the Boulets: Erika Klash and Victoria Black; Exterminated: Erika Klash
5	Zombie Prom	November 22, 2022	Fright Feat Challenge (Pig Brains): Eat a plate of pig brains. Fright Feat Prize: Immunity from elimination. Fright Feat Winner: Evah Destruction Floor Show Challenge (Zombie Prom Floorshow): Create and showcase two looks: a generic prom look and the same prom guest after being bitten by a zombie. This challenge was inspired by Dragula Season 1 Episode 3: "Zombies in Death Valley" and Season 1 Episode 4 "Pretty, Pink, Fishy Drag". Floor Show Winner: Victoria Black; Floor Show Prize: Choosing the bottom 2 Bottom 2 chosen by Victoria Black: Abhora and Astrud Aurelia; Exterminated: Abhora
6	The Ugly Ladies of Wrestling Rematch!	November 29, 2022	Fright Feat Challenge (Arm Wrestling): Arm wrestling. Fright Feat Prize: Choosing the teams for the Floorshow. Fright Feat Winner: Koco Caine Floor Show Challenge (Ugly Ladies of Wrestling): Create and showcase a wrestling look featuring a wig from Arda Wigs and choreograph a wrestling match. This challenge was inspired by Dragula Season 1 Episode 2: "80's Female Wrestler". Floor Show Winner: Melissa Befierce Bottom 2 chosen by the Boulets: Evah Destruction and HoSo Terra Toma; Exterminated: None
7	Sea Monsters of the Depths	December 6, 2022	Fright Feat Challenge (Submerged Cell): Survive a flooding cell while trying to open a combination lock. Fright Feat Winner: Everyone Floor Show Challenge (Sea Monsters of the Depths): Create and showcase a sea monster look. Floor Show Winner: Evah Destruction Bottom 2 chosen by the Boulets: Koco Caine and Melissa Befierce; Quit: Melissa Befierce
8	Horror Icons Reanimated	December 13, 2022	Fright Feat Challenge (Lie Detector): Answer questions while connected to a lie detector and a shock collar. Fright Feat Winner: Everyone Floor Show Challenge (Horror Icons Reanimated): Create and showcase a look inspired by a horror icon and reenact one of their famous scenes. This challenge was inspired by Dragula Season 4 Episode 1: "Horror Icons Reimagined".: Astrud Aurelia chose a Predator; Evah Destruction chose a Martian; HoSo Terra Toma chose Sadako Yamamura; Koco Caine chose The Boulet Brothers; Victoria Black chose The Cryptkeeper; Floor Show Winner: HoSo Terra Toma Bottom 4 chosen by the Boulets: Astrud Aurelia, Evah Destruction, Koco Caine and Victoria Black; Exterminated: Astrud Aurelia and Evah Destruction
9	Grand Finale	December 20, 2022	For the final episode there is no Fright Feat challenge. Instead the finalists are interviewed on the Boulets' podcast Creatures of the Night. Floor Show Challenge (Grand Finale): Create and showcase a single look incorporating the four principles of Dragula (Drag, Filth, Horror, and Glamour) and perform a lip-sync to the Boulets' single "Ascension". Floor Show Winner: Victoria Black
