= The Boulet Brothers' Dragula season 7 =

American reality television series season

The Boulet Brothers' Dragula
- Season 7
- Promotional poster for season seven
- Hosted by: The Boulet Brothers
- Judges: Dracmorda Boulet; Swanthula Boulet
- No. of contestants: 12
- No. of episodes: 4

Release
- Original network: AMC+/Shudder (United States)
- Original release: 27 October 2026 – present

Season chronology
- ← Previous; Season 6

The seventh season of The Boulet Brothers' Dragula premiered on October 27, 2026, on AMC+ and Shudder. The season was confirmed by Shudder on April 23, 2025.

== Production ==
On December 20, 2024, it was announced via the shows official Instagram page that casting for the seventh season was now open. Applications remained open for five weeks until closing on February 14, 2025.

The cast was officially revealed on October 1, 2026, featuring 12 contestants competing for the title of World's Next Drag Supermonster and a cash prize of $100,000.

== Contestants ==
Contestants of The Boulet Brothers' Dragula season 7
Contestant	Age	Hometown	Outcome
Areal Haunting	31	Rockford, Illinois	TBA
Dvvsk	TBA	Los Angeles, California	TBA
Felony Dodger (Note: Felony Dodger previously competed on The Boulet Brothers' Dragula season 2, where they placed tenth.)	37	Los Angeles, California	TBA
Inkubus	TBA	Gold Coast, Australia	TBA
Krustyna Clown	37	Anchorage, Alaska	TBA
Satanna (Note: Satanna previously competed on The Boulet Brothers' Dragula season 5, where she placed tenth.)	30	Los Angeles, California	TBA
Scythe	TBA	Alajuela, Costa Rica	TBA
Vanda LaRose	28	Chicago, Illinois	TBA
Annie Agurl	TBA	Atlanta, Georgia	9th place
Koochie-Koochie Ku	TBA	Atlanta, Georgia	9th place
Samuel Bendix	35	Fortaleza, Brazil	11th place
Purus (Note: Purus Tal-iban is referred to as Purus on the show.)	TBA	Querétaro, Mexico	12th place

== Contestant progress ==
Legend:

WIN indicates that the contestant won the challenge.
IMM (Immunity) indicates that Dvvsk received Glinda's Bubble of Protection, which granted immunity from extermination.
SAFE indicates that the contestant was declared safe by the judges.
BTM (Bottom) indicates that the contestant was up for extermination.
EXT (Exterminated) indicates that the contestant was exterminated.

Progress of contestants including placements in each episode
Contestant	Episode				
Contestant	1	2	3	4	5
Areal Haunting	SAFE	BTM	BTM	SAFE	TBA
Dvvsk	IMM	SAFE	SAFE	BTM	TBA
Felony Dodger	SAFE	SAFE	SAFE	SAFE	TBA
Inkubus	SAFE	WIN	SAFE	SAFE	TBA
Krustyna Clown	SAFE	SAFE	WIN	SAFE	TBA
Satanna	SAFE	SAFE	SAFE	SAFE	TBA
Scythe	WIN	SAFE	SAFE	WIN	TBA
Vanda LaRose	SAFE	SAFE	SAFE	SAFE	TBA
Annie Agurl	BTM	SAFE	SAFE	EXT	
Koochie-Koochie Ku	SAFE	SAFE	BTM	EXT	
Samuel Bendix	SAFE	BTM	EXT		
Purus	EXT				

== Exterminations ==
Legend:

The contestant was exterminated after their first time in the bottom.
The contestant was exterminated after their second time in the bottom.

Episode	Contestants			Challenge	Exterminated
1	Annie Agurl	vs.	Purus	Scale a mountain and brave ziplines to collect the witch's broom.	Purus
2	Areal Haunting	vs.	Samuel Bendix	Get strapped to a target while a knife thrower throws knives and axes at it.	None
3	Areal Haunting vs. Koochie-Koochie Ku vs. Samuel Bendix			Perform in a lip-sync battle to "Let's Have a Satanic Orgy" by Twin Temple.	Samuel Bendix
4	Annie Agurl vs. Dvvsk vs. Koochie-Koochie Ku			Get covered in a swarm of live bees with no protective gear.	Annie Agurl
4	Annie Agurl vs. Dvvsk vs. Koochie-Koochie Ku			Get covered in a swarm of live bees with no protective gear.	Koochie-Koochie Ku

== Guest judges ==
Episode	Guest judges
1	Rose McGowan, actress and activist Darren Stein, film maker
2	Doug Jones, actor Yvie Oddly, drag performer, musician and winner of RuPaul's Drag Race season 11
3	Dahli, drag performer, entertainer and winner of season 4 Rachel True, actress
4	James A. Janisse, youtuber and horror host Chelsea Rebecca, youtuber and horror host

== Episodes ==
Episode	Title	Original airdate	Episode summary
1	Horror in Oz	October 27, 2026	Fright Feat Challenge: Survive a blindfolded trip across a field with a simulated tornado to find a pair of ruby slippers in the shortest time Fright Feat Prize: Immunity from extermination using "Glinda's Bubble of Protection"; Fright Feat Winner: Dvvsk Floor Show Challenge: Conceptualize and showcase a look for the theme "Horror in Oz"; Floor Show Winner: Scythe Extermination Challenge: Scale a mountain and brave ziplines to collect the witch's broom Participants: Annie Agurl and Purus; Exterminated: Purus
2	Circus of Screams	November 3, 2026	Fright Feat Challenge: Walk on glass in the shortest time Fright Feat Prize: Cast the curse of "Tears of a Clown," making the cursed contestant paint a clown face instead of their planned makeup Fright Feat Winner: Felony Dodger; Cursed Contestant: Annie Agurl Floor Show Challenge: Conceptualize and showcase a look for the theme "Circus of Screams", while performing a lip sync to "Peek-A-Boo" by Siouxsie and the Banshees; Floor Show Winner: Inkubus Extermination Challenge: Get strapped to a target while a knife thrower throws knives and axes at it Participants: Areal Haunting and Samuel Bendix; Exterminated: None
3	Monsters of Rock	November 10, 2026	Fright Feat Challenge: Hotter Than Hell - eat increasingly spicier foods Fright Feat Prize: Assign the rock bands for the Floor Show Challenge; Fright Feat Winner: Krustyna Clown Bands: Feral Pussy: Dvvsk, Felony Dodger, Incubus, Satanna; Hexadermy Areal Haunting, Koochie-Koochie Ku, Samuel Bendix; Hot Flashes: Annie Agurl, Krustyna Klown, Scythe, Vanda LaRose; Floor Show Challenge: Perform a group lip-sync to "Stigmata" by Ministry, while showcasing looks for the theme "Granny Hags from Hell"; Winning Band: Hot Flashes; Floor Show Winner: Krustyna Clown Extermination Challenge: Perform in a lip-sync battle to "Let's Have a Satanic Orgy" by Twin Temple; Participants: Areal Haunting, Koochie-Koochie Ku and Samuel Bendix; Exterminated: Samuel Bendix
4	Campground Massacre	November 17, 2026	Floor Show Challenge: Conceptualize and showcase two looks for the themes "Basic Bitch" and "Campground Killer"; Floor Show Winner: Scythe Extermination Challenge: Get covered in a swarm of 10,000 live bees with no protective gear Participants: Annie Agurl, Dvvsk and Koochie-Koochie Ku; Exterminated: Annie Agurl and Koochie-Koochie Ku
5	TBA	November 24, 2026	Fright Feat Challenge: Fright Feat Prize: Fright Feat Winner: Cursed Contestant: Floor Show Challenge: Floor Show Winner: Extermination Challenge: Participants: Exterminated:
