= Koco Caine =

Drag performer

- Born: January 13, 1995 (age 31)
- Other name: Kocoum Caine
- Occupation: Drag performer
- Television: The Boulet Brothers' Dragula (season 4)

Koco Caine (born January 13, 1995) is an American drag performer from Tulsa, Oklahoma who competed on the fourth season of The Boulet Brothers' Dragula (2021) as well as the first season of The Boulet Brothers' Dragula: Titans (2022), where she was a finalist with HoSo Terra Toma and winner Victoria Elizabeth Black.

== Personal life ==
She is from Tulsa, Oklahoma and is currently based in Phoenix, Arizona. She won the pageants National Drag Monster 2019 and Mr. Oklahoma Bold & Beautiful Newcomer 2017. She is Transgender.

== Filmography ==
=== Television ===
- The Boulet Brothers' Dragula (season 4)
- The Boulet Brothers' Dragula: Titans

== See also ==
- List of people from Tulsa, Oklahoma
