= La Zavaleta =

Drag performer

- Born: Diego; New York City, New York, USA
- Occupation: Drag performer
- Television: The Boulet Brothers' Dragula (season 4); The Boulet Brothers' Dragula: Titans (season 2)

La Zavaleta is the stage name of Diego, an American drag performer from Brooklyn, New York who competed on the fourth season of The Boulet Brothers' Dragula and season 2 of The Boulet Brothers' Dragula: Titans.

== Personal life ==
Zavaleta was born in New York City and moved to Mexico City at the age of 3. Zavaleta stayed there for 12 years before moving back to the United States.

== Career ==
Zavaleta started doing drag on August 1, 2018. She performed in Queens and Manhattan before focusing on Brooklyn. Bushwig co-founder Horrorchata is her drag mother. Zavaleta won Queen of Bushwig in 2021. Her drag name comes from singer and actress Susana Zabaleta.

On the fourth season of Dragula, she presented a version of Emiliano Zapata for the "Weird, Wild West" category. She placed fifth overall after an extermination challenge of being vacuum-sealed to a wall.

== Filmography ==
=== Television ===
- The Boulet Brothers' Dragula (season 4)

== See also ==
- List of people from New York (state)
