= Erika Klash =

American drag performer

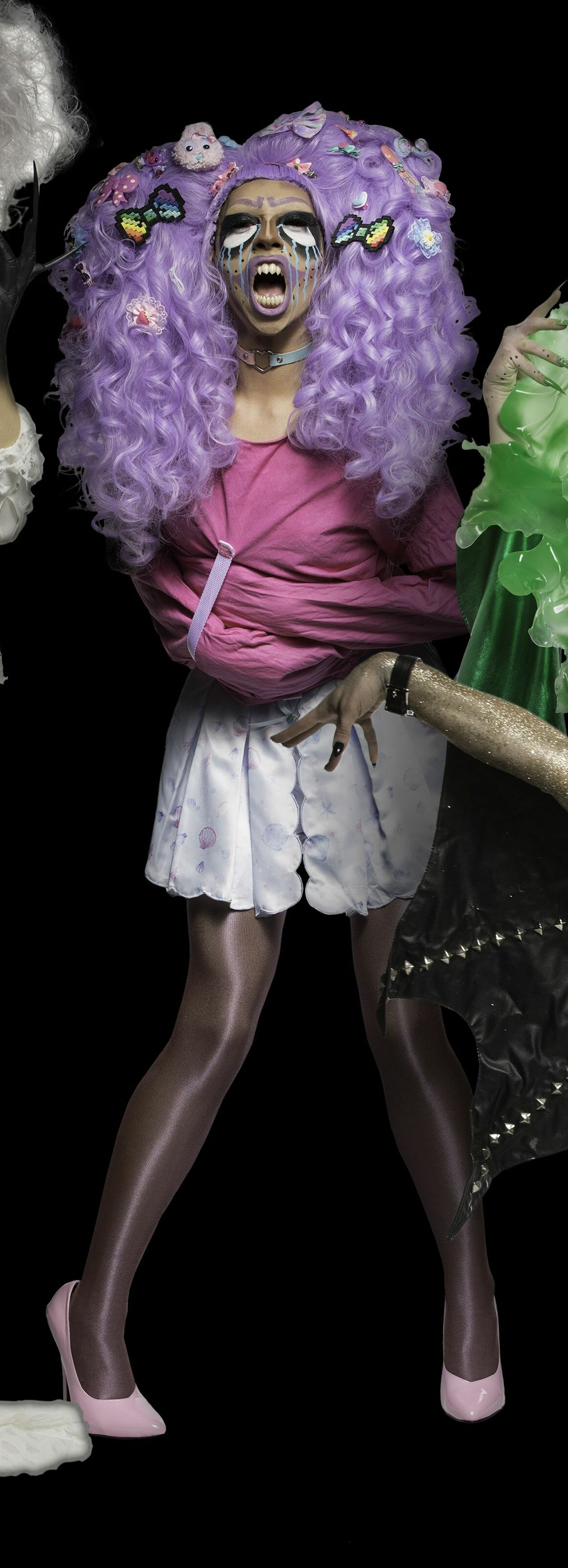
- Erika Klash in promotional artwork for season 2 of The Boulet Brothers' Dragula, 2017
- Born: Michael Gabriel Torres; January 25, 1984 (age 42); Miami, Florida, U.S.
- Other name: Miki Torres
- Occupation: Drag performer
- Television: The Boulet Brothers' Dragula (season 2)

Erika Klash is the stage name of Michael Gabriel "Miki" Torres, an American drag performer from The Bronx, New York who competed on season 2 of The Boulet Brothers' Dragula and season 1 of The Boulet Brothers' Dragula: Titans in 2022.

== Personal life ==
Torres was born in Miami, Florida to her mother, Lourdes. She has two sisters, Jessica and Rebecca. The Torres family, who are Nuyoricans, moved back to New York City at age 3. He grew up in The Bronx, New York and went to Hostos-Lincoln Academy of Science in Mott Haven, New York where he was a member of the GSA club and a theater kid. Before Dragula, he worked with Mimi Imfurst and Alaska Thunderfuck.

== Career ==
Erika Klash started doing drag in West Village, Manhattan at age 21. Her drag is inspired by anime and Japanese street fashion. Her biggest inspirations are Sailor Moon and the witches from Madoka Magica. The name Erika comes from what her mother would've named her if she was born a girl. The surname Klash comes from the 1995 Mario game Mario Clash, made for the Virtual Boy console. Her first performance was in March 2014 at the Lips Drag Queen Show Palace Restaurant & Bar in Chelsea, Manhattan.

Erika Klash competed on the second season of The Boulet Brothers' Dragula, placing sixth overall. She returned to compete on The Boulet Brothers' Dragula: Titans in 2022, placing eighth overall.

== Filmography ==
=== Television ===
- The Boulet Brothers' Dragula (season 2)
- The Boulet Brothers' Dragula: Titans

== See also ==
- List of people from New York City
