= Arizona School for the Arts =

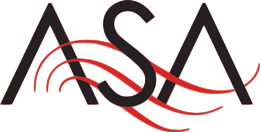

Location
- 1410 N 3rd St; Phoenix, Arizona 85004; United States; 33°27′52″N 112°04′11″W

Information
- School type: Public charter school
- Established: 1995
- Grades: 5–12
- Enrollment: 759 (2023–2024)
- Colors: Red, white, black
- Mascot: Stumpy the Pigeon
- Website: www.goasa.org

Arizona School for the Arts is a non-profit public charter school in Phoenix, Arizona. Emphasis is placed on a college preparatory curriculum and the performing arts. Its mascot is a one-legged pigeon named Stumpy.

== History ==
It was founded in 1995 by Dr. Mark Francis, with 155 students in grades 7–10. By 2002, it had grown to 280 students.

In 2005, it was honored as a Blue Ribbon school.

In 2008, it bought two buildings adjacent to its existing campus as demand for growth increased. This growth has allowed ASA to expand its enrollment by 80 high school students between 2007 and 2010.

== Notable alumni ==
- Astrud Aurelia - Drag queen
- Matt Dallas - Actor, ABC Family TV show Kyle XY
- David Hallberg – Ballet dancer
- Kacy Hill - Singer/Songwriter
- Alexandra Shipp – Actress
- Taylor Upsahl - Singer/Songwriter
