= Bitter Betty =

American drag performer

- Born: December 30, 1980 (age 45); Cookeville, Tennessee, U.S.
- Other name: Sara Andrews
- Television: The Boulet Brothers' Dragula (season 4)
- Website: missbitterbetty.com

Bitter Betty is the stage name of Sara Andrews, an American drag performer who competed on season 4 of The Boulet Brothers' Dragula. She is based in Los Angeles.

== Early life ==
Sara Andrews was born to Connie Richardson on December 30, 1980. She attended Cookeville High School in Cookeville, Tennessee. Andrews was raised in an orphanage from the ages of 10 to 18 after her mother, who "heard voices", fired gunshots at her lover's house while his wife was inside. Although nobody was injured, Andrews was placed into a foster home as a result.

== Career ==
In 1998, at the age of 18, Andrews moved to Nashville, Tennessee, where she began performing at The Connection and Play Dance Bar for "about 10-15 years". She met her husband in Nashville in 2012. The two moved to Orlando, Florida, then Chicago, Illinois, and finally Los Angeles, California. Bitter Betty names her "drag mothers" to be Danielle de la Fontaine and Austria Andrews. She began a wig styling business, Wig Takeout, in 2017.

Drag performer Bitter Betty competed on season 4 of The Boulet Brothers' Dragula. She placed seventh overall. In 2022, Liz Lavery of Screen Rant wrote, "Bitter Betty is not the first MTF transgender person to be on a U.S. drag show. She is, however, the first one to be openly accepted with no controversy."

== Personal life ==
Bitter Betty is a trans woman who uses the pronouns she/her. She married Taylor Andrews in 2016.

== Filmography ==
=== Television ===
- The Boulet Brothers' Dragula (season 4)

== See also ==
- List of people from Los Angeles
