= Formelda Hyde =

American drag king

- Born: Brian Garcia; January 12, 2000 (age 26)
- Occupation: Drag performer
- Television: The Boulet Brothers' Dragula (season 4)

Formelda Hyde is the stage name of Brian Garcia, an American drag performer/drag monster who competed on season 4 of The Boulet Brothers' Dragula. He was the show's second masked drag performer.

== Early life and career ==
Brian Garcia was born on January 12, 2000 and raised in Phoenix, Arizona. He was introduced to drag after watching The Rocky Horror Picture Show at age 13, started working as a makeup artist at the age of 14, and began performing as Formelda Hyde in February 2020. His stage name is a pun on the organic compound formaldehyde.

In 2021, Formelda Hyde was announced as part of the cast of The Boulet Brothers' Dragula season 4. He was the first contestant to be eliminated.

== Personal life ==
Formelda Hyde is based in Phoenix, Arizona and uses he/him and they/them pronouns. He describes his drag as the "love child of Clive Barker and Guillermo del Toro".

== Filmography ==
=== Television ===
- The Boulet Brothers' Dragula (season 4)
