= Cookeville High School =

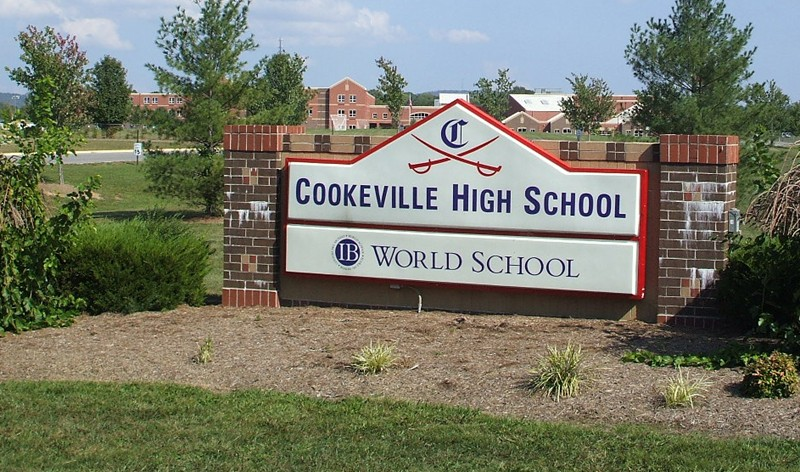

Location
- 1 Cavalier Drive; Cookeville, Tennessee 38501; United States; 36°11′34″N 85°29′14″W

Information
- School type: Public school (government funded), High school
- Opened: 1996
- School district: Putnam County Schools
- NCES District ID: 4703480
- NCES School ID: 470348001457
- President: Samuel Powers
- Principal: Karen Trentham
- Staff: 135.72 (on an FTE basis)
- Grades: 9–12
- Enrollment: 2,202 (2023–2024)
- Student to teacher ratio: 16.22
- Colors: Red, navy, and white
- Nickname: Cavaliers
- Newspaper: The Charger
- Website: School website

Cookeville High School is a public secondary education facility located in Cookeville, Tennessee. It is part of the Putnam County School System.

== History ==
According to Putnam County historian Mary Jean DeLozier, the first ‘high school’ established in Cookeville, Tennessee, was a privately funded, four-year subscription high school called Washington Academy. It was established in 1891, on Spring St. where the Cookeville City Hall is today. In 1894, the state transferred Washington Academy into a newly incorporated high school named Cookeville High School. One principal and five teachers constituted the entire twelve-grade faculty with 175 students.

In 1899, the old building was razed and a new one built on the same site called Cookeville Collegiate Institute, which was financed by subscriptions, donations, and out-of-town tuition. The school taught eight elementary and four secondary grades in a two-story frame building with 8 rooms and a four-acre yard. After the city of Cookeville incorporated in 1903 and levied taxes for education, its new school used the Cookeville Collegiate Institute building and kept that name for several years until it became known as Cookeville City School in the late 1900s. In 1914, Putnam County levied a 10-cent property tax for education and moved to provide public high school education for all children in Putnam County.

In the fall of 1914, Dixie College (later known as Tennessee Polytechnic Institute and today known as Tennessee Technological University) opened the first four-year, county-owned high school. Students attended high school at Dixie College until 1924, when college officials decided they could no longer accommodate high school students. Students then moved back to Cookeville City School. In the 1920s and 1930s, civic leaders began to call for building a new high school in the Cookeville area, but the Quarterly Court (today known as the County Commission) twice refused to vote bonds for a new building.

In April 1931, Putnam County put the question to a vote and voters approved a measure to issue $50,000 in bonds to be matched by Cookeville funds to build a new school. In 1932, the county bought 14 acres on the northern side of the city and built Central High School. The building (which later became Prescott Central Middle School and is a part of the campus of Tennessee Tech today) had 14 classrooms, a cafeteria, a gym, an auditorium, science labs, and facilities for teaching home economics and industrial arts. In 1940, Central High School had 12 faculty members and 307 students.

By the 1960s, the school was overcrowded, and the Quarterly Court approved a bond issue to build a new $2.2 million high school to house grades 10 through 12. Central High would become a junior high school and Algood High in neighboring Algood, would be phased out, with students there to attend the new Putnam County Senior High. The new school, built on the ‘pod’ concept, was built on E. Spring St. (today Avery Trace Middle School) and its doors opened in 1966. In 1981, following a student initiative, the name was changed from Putnam Senior High to Cookeville High School.

By the 1980s, the continuing growth of Cookeville caused more overcrowding problems for the school. A task force composed of citizens, educators, school officials, and government leaders came to the conclusion that a restructuring of school grade levels and some new buildings would solve the problem. They recommended building a new high school, turning the Cookeville Junior High and the existing Cookeville High School into middle schools, and leaving all Cookeville elementary schools K-4 schools. The plan was not fully approved until the 1990s and the new site was chosen in 1994. The site elected was the Putnam Airport property on N. Washington Ave. The property, already owned by Putnam County, would save the county from buying any new expensive property and the airport at the site was hemmed in and too cramped to grow. Ground was broken on the $35 million new school project in the fall of 1994, and the building was completed for the 1996–1997 school year.

== Demographics ==
According to the school's website, the demographic breakdown of the student population (as of 2009) was as follows:

- White – 89.8%
- African American – 2.8%
- Hispanic – 5.5%
- Native American/Alaskan – 0.5%
- Asian – 1.88%

Statistics as of 2012

== Notable alumni ==
- Judah Akers – member of alternative rock band Judah & the Lion
- Bitter Betty – drag queen
- Mack Brown – former college football coach for Texas Longhorns and University of Texas at Austin, member of the College Football Hall of Fame
- Watson Brown – college football coach
- Robin Clark – early 1960s pop singer, known as Ilo Hershiser while attending school
- Carl Dale – professional baseball pitcher
- Predrag Danilović – NBA basketball player
- Rich Froning Jr. – Crossfit athlete
