= Meatball (drag queen) =

American drag queen (born 1989)

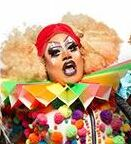
- Meatball in 2016
- Born: Logan Jennings; July 13, 1989 (age 37); Baton Rouge, Louisiana, USA
- Occupations: Drag queen, podcaster
- Known for: The Boulet Brothers' Dragula (season 1) season 1 contestant, George Santos viral drag number

Logan Jennings (born July 13, 1989), known professionally as Meatball, is an American drag queen, performer, and podcaster. She was a contestant on the first season of The Boulet Brothers' Dragula, co-hosts the podcast Sloppy Seconds, and went viral for her drag performance of politician George Santos in 2023.

== Early life ==
Jennings was born in Baton Rouge, Louisiana and adopted right after. His family moved to Cairo, Egypt three days later. His dad was a lead engineer for an oil company, which forced the family to move frequently, including London, England and Norway. They eventually settled in Houston, Texas, where Jennings grew up. Jennings went to high school at Interlochen Center for the Arts in Interlochen, Michigan, where she was voted "Most Likely to be on the Cover of the National Enquirer". After graduating, Jennings moved to East Village, New York before moving to Los Angeles.

== Career ==
Meatball began her career performing in the Los Angeles drag scene after being inspired by RuPaul's Drag Race. Before the television version, Meatball also won the club contest version of Dragula, whose other winners include fellow Dragula season 1 contestant Pinche and RuPaul's Drag Race contestant Valentina.

She was a contestant on Dragula season 1, where she took fourth place and was the "fan favorite" winner. She returned in a cameo skit during the last supper of season 2.

Meatball also co-hosts the podcast Sloppy Seconds with rapper and producer Big Dipper as part of the Moguls Of Media (MOM) Network, created by Drag Race contestants Alaska and Willam. The pair also hosted the podcast UnBEARable prior to Sloppy Seconds. Meatball is very well known on Sloppy Seconds for her views on the failing merits of the second act of the musical Wicked.

Meatball was also the live correspondent for dating app Hornet for RuPaul's Drag Con and other LGBT nightlife events. Meatball also currently hosts the drag show Fat Slut at Precinct Club in Los Angeles, the show has also toured to different cities across the United States. She was a finalist in the 2022 Drag Queen of the Year pageant, produced by Alaska Thunderfuck and Lola LeCroix.

On February 26, 2023, Meatball performed at Sasha Velour's monthly drag showcase NightGowns at the Le Poisson Rouge in New York City as George Santos's alleged drag persona Kitara Ravache to The Greatest Showman's "This Is Me." A clip of the performance went viral on TikTok and Instagram and was featured on an episode of Jimmy Kimmel Live!

== Filmography ==
=== Television ===
Year	Series	Role	Notes
2016-17	The Boulet Brothers' Dragula	Herself	Contestant, 4th place
2018	The Boulet Brothers' Dragula	Herself	Guest, 1 episode.
2021	Pretty Smart	Kai	Guest 1 episode
2023	Launchpad (TV series)	O’hura Cain	Guest 1 episode
2023	Drag Me to Dinner	Herself	Guest 1 episode
2026	Celebrity Family Feud	Herself	Guest 1 episode

=== Web series ===
Year	Series	Role	Notes
2017	Hey Qween!	Herself	Dragula Season 1 Reunion
2018	Get Ready WITHOUT Me	Herself	Guest; 1 episode
2018-22	Welcome to Meatland	Herself	
2019	Como Se Dice?	Herself	Guest; 1 episode.
2022	Meatball is the hairy comedy drag queen you need to know	Herself	Documentary
2024	I Like to Watch	Herself	Guest; 1 episode
2024	Give It To Me Straight	Herself	Guest; 1 episode
2025	Dragged Ink	Herself	Guest; 1 episode

=== Podcasts ===
Year	Series	Role	Notes
2017-18	unBEARable	Co-host	with Big Dipper
2018-22	Race Chaser	Guest	Multiple episodes
2019	Whimsically Volatile	Guest	
2019–present	Sloppy Seconds	Co-host	with Big Dipper
2022	I'm 40% Podcast with Jinkx Monsoon	Guest	
2024	Very Delta	Guest	
2026	The Bald & the Beautiful	Guest	

=== Music videos ===
Year	Title	Artist	Ref.
2017	"In the End"	STRFKR	
2020	"Pink Pony Club"	Chappell Roan	
2025	"Tears"	Sabrina Carpenter	
