= Saint (drag queen) =

American drag performer

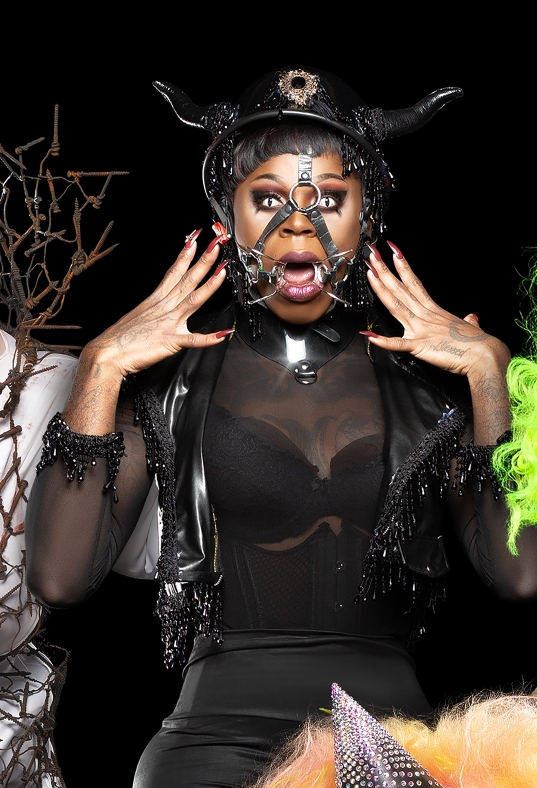
- Saint in promotional artwork for season 3 of The Boulet Brothers' Dragula, 2019
- Born: Shaquille Foreman
- Other name: St. Lucia
- Television: The Boulet Brothers' Dragula (season 3, season 4, Resurrection)

Saint (formerly St. Lucia) is the stage name of Shaquille Foreman, an American drag performer who competed on seasons 3 and 4 of The Boulet Brothers' Dragula, as well as The Boulet Brothers' Dragula: Resurrection.

== Personal life ==
Saint is based in Atlanta, Georgia and grew up in Lansing, Michigan. They have previously been based in Harlem, Manhattan, New York City.

Saint uses he/him, she/her, and they/them pronouns.

== Filmography ==
=== Television ===
- The Boulet Brothers' Dragula (season 3)
- The Boulet Brothers' Dragula (season 4)
- The Boulet Brothers' Dragula: Resurrection
