= Auntie Heroine =

Drag performer

- Born: Stephen Ramberg; Rockford, Illinois, USA
- Occupation: Drag performer
- Television: The Boulet Brothers' Dragula (season 6)

Auntie Heroine is the stage name of Stephen Ramberg, a drag performer from Rockford, Illinois who is best known for being the runner-up on season 6 of The Boulet Brothers' Dragula.

== Personal life ==
Ramberg grew up in Rockford, Illinois and attended Illinois State University in Normal, Illinois. Heroine is non-binary. They have worked with kids with disabilities at Rock Valley College.

== Career ==
They started doing drag at age 23. In 2018, Heroine opened an all-ages venue called Auntie's Treasures. They also created the Haus of Heroine, which includes Angelíca Grace, Nena Dee, and Scylla, who's also on season 6 of The Boulet Brothers' Dragula with Heroine.

== Filmography ==
=== Television ===
- The Boulet Brothers' Dragula (season 6)

== See also ==
- List of people from Illinois
