= Evah Destruction =

American drag performer

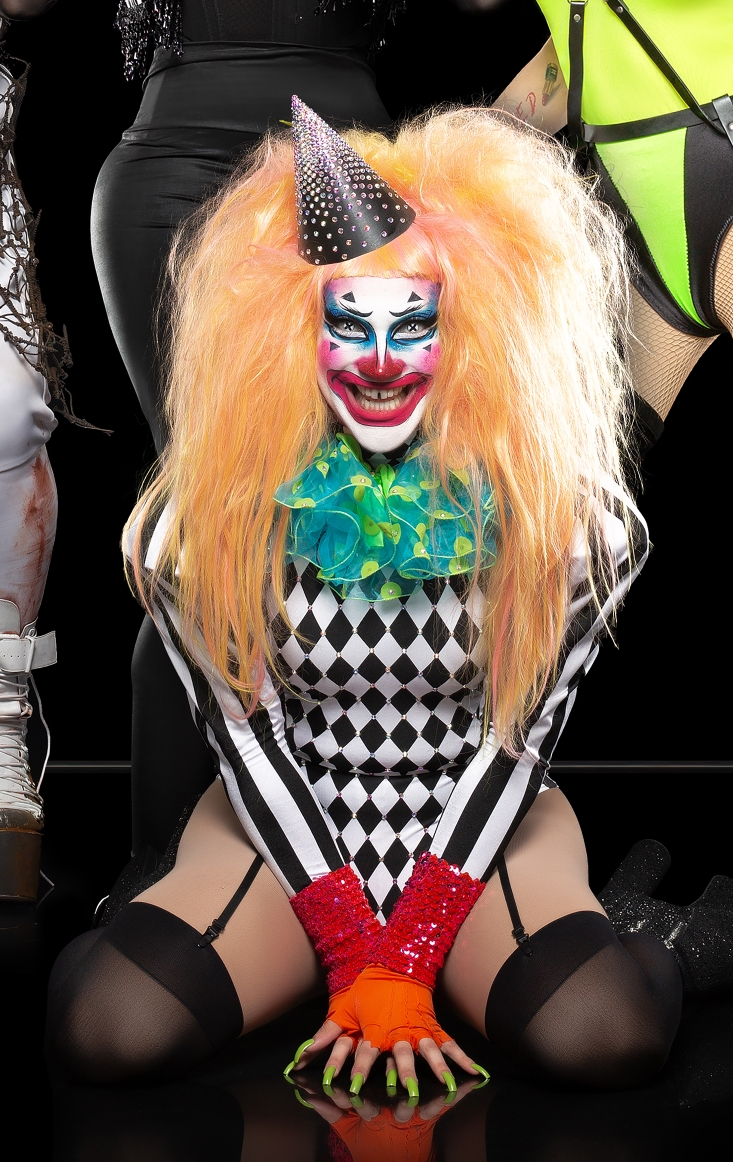
- Evah Destruction in promotional artwork for season 3 of The Boulet Brothers' Dragula, 2019
- Born: Alexander Surian; Bedford, Texas, U.S.
- Occupation: Drag performer
- Television: The Boulet Brothers' Dragula (season 3); The Boulet Brothers' Dragula: Titans (season 1, season 2)

Evah Destruction is the stage name of Alexander Surian, an American drag performer from Texas who competed on season 3 of The Boulet Brothers' Dragula as well as the first season and winning the second season of The Boulet Brothers' Dragula: Titans.

== Personal life ==
Destruction grew up in Bedford, Texas, and went to high school in Georgia. She lived in Austin and Dallas during her appearances on Dragula. She has ADHD. She is of Nicaraguan and Honduran descent.

== Career ==
Evah Destruction started doing drag in Atlanta at age 18 after seeing Phoenix and her drag mother Jasmine Antoinette perform. Her first performance was at Le Buzz in Marietta, Georgia, to Lady Gaga's "Bad Romance" (2009). Her lesbian friend gave her the name Evah Destruction. She also went with Genevieve. She won Best of Atlanta in 2016.

Evah Destruction appeared on season 3 of The Boulet Brothers' Dragula, where she placed fifth overall. She placed 4th/5th on Titans. She returned for the second Season of Titans, where she won the season and was crowned “Queen of the Underworld.”

== Filmography ==
| Year | Title | Genre | Role | Notes | Ref |
|---|---|---|---|---|---|
| 2019 | The Boulet Brothers' Dragula | TV | Contestant | Season 3; 5th place (8 episodes) | |
| 2022 | The Boulet Brothers' Dragula: Titans | TV | Contestant | Season 1; 4th place (8 episodes) | |
| 2025 | The Boulet Brothers' Dragula: Titans | TV | Contestant | Season 2; Winner (10 episodes) | |

== See also ==
- List of people from Austin, Texas
- List of people from Dallas
- List of people from Marietta, Georgia
