= Niohuru X =

Chinese drag performer

- Born: Tianjin, China
- Other name: VampireChinese
- Occupations: Drag performer; fashion designer; make-up artist
- Years active: 2021–present
- Television: The Boulet Brothers' Dragula (season 5)

Niohuru X, also known as VampireChinese, is a Manchu Chinese drag performer, fashion designer, and make-up artist. She is best known for winning the fifth season of The Boulet Brothers' Dragula.

== Career ==
Niohuru X resided in Brooklyn and attended Parsons School of Design to study fashion design; due to the COVID-19 pandemic, she dropped out. Before the pandemic, she first discovered drag at a bar. She started her drag career under the persona Niohuru X; her drag is inspired by Chinese folklore.

Niohuru X was revealed as one of the contestants competing in the fifth season of The Boulet Brothers' Dragula on 3 October 2023. She was declared a winner in the first and seventh episodes, was placed at the bottom twice, eliminating Anna Phylactic and Fantasia Royale Gaga. In the finale episode, she had to create three outfits representing filth, horror, and glamour. In the same episode, she participated in a lip-sync battle to Ladytron's "Destroy Everything You Touch" (2005). Niohuru X was crowned as "The World's Next Drag Supermonster" with a cash prize of $100,000.

== Personal life ==
Niohuru X was born in Tianjin. She is a trans woman. She met Orkgotik, another contestant while filming The Boulet Brothers' Dragula, where they established a romantic relationship. After finishing the recording of the program, the couple moved to Los Angeles.

== Filmography ==
=== Television ===
List of television credits
Year	Title	Role	Notes	Ref.
2023	The Boulet Brothers' Dragula (season 5)	Herself/Contestant	Winner	

Awards and achievements
Preceded by Dahli	Winner of The Boulet Brothers' Dragula; Season 5 (2023–2024)	Succeeded by Asia Consent
