= HoSo Terra Toma =

South Korean drag performer

- 호소테라토마
- Born: March 28, 2002 (age 24); Haebangchon, Seoul, South Korea
- Television: The Boulet Brothers' Dragula

HoSo Terra Toma (Korean: 호소테라토마) is a South Korean-American drag performer who competed on season 4 of The Boulet Brothers' Dragula and season 1 of The Boulet Brothers' Dragula: Titans. She participated in the Boulet Brothers Tour in 2023.

== Career ==
HoSo Terra Toma was introduced to drag by watching Kim Chi compete on RuPaul's Drag Race. Her stage name consists of "HoSo", which is derived from the Korean-language phrase for the term "little faggot" (homo so-nyeon, Korean: 호모 소년), and "Terra Toma" in reference to a teratoma tumor, which was inspired by her time undergoing chemotherapy for lymphoma. She competed on the fourth season of The Boulet Brothers' Dragula (2021) and the first season of The Boulet Brothers' Dragula: Titans (2022), where she placed as a runner-up both times. She is the show's first South Korean contestant. In 2023, HoSo appeared in Jazmin Bean's music video "Favorite Toy".

== Personal life ==
HoSo Terra Toma uses she/her pronouns. She is a survivor of lymphoma. HoSo has cited her artistic inspirations to be H. R. Giger, Junji Ito, Power Rangers, yōkai, and kaiju monsters. She is based in Haebangchon, Seoul, South Korea.

== Filmography ==
=== Television ===
| Year | Title | Role | Notes |
|---|---|---|---|
| 2021 | The Boulet Brothers' Dragula | Contestant | Season 4, Runner-up (10 episodes) |
| 2022 | The Boulet Brothers' Dragula: Titans | Contestant | Season 1, Runner-up (9 episodes) |
