= Victoria Black =

American drag performer

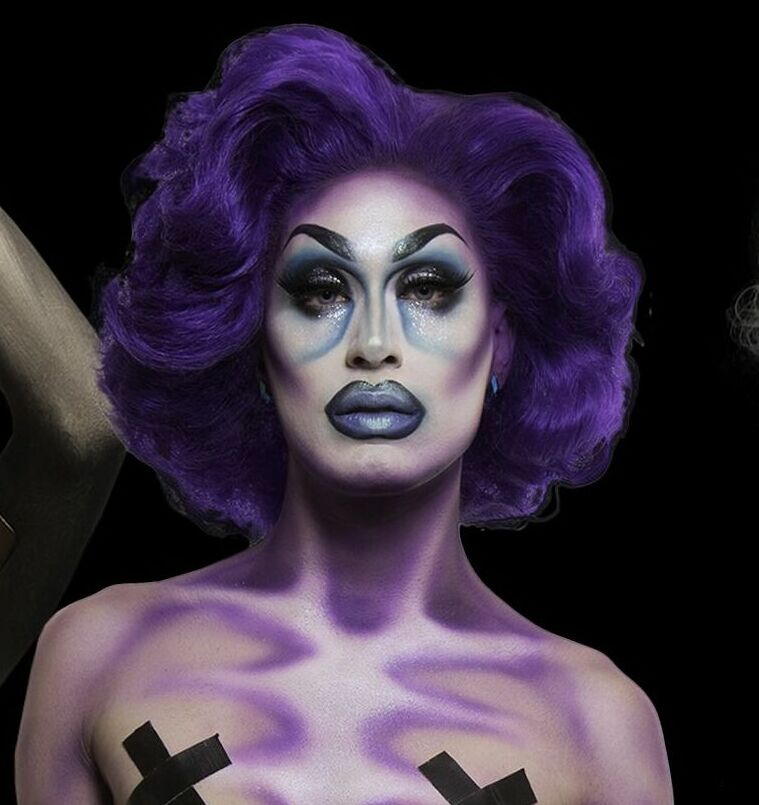
- Victoria Black in promotional artwork for season 2 of The Boulet Brothers' Dragula, 2017
- Born: Demetrio Asciutto
- Other name: Victoria Elizabeth Black
- Television: The Boulet Brothers' Dragula

Victoria Black (formerly Victoria Elizabeth Black) is the stage name of Demetrio Asciutto, an American drag performer who competed on season 2 of The Boulet Brothers' Dragula, and won season 1 of The Boulet Brothers' Dragula: Titans.

== Early life ==
Victoria Black was raised in Orlando, Florida. They were introduced to horror at age 3 by their grandfather's Halloween store, and discovered scare acting after visiting Universal's Halloween Horror Nights at age 9.

== Career ==
Prior to the formation of her drag character, Victoria Black learned the art of prosthetics and horror makeup through working at various haunted houses and Halloween Horror Nights.

In 2018, Black competed on season 2 of The Boulet Brothers' Dragula. During her time on the season, she won the "Ghost Town Ghouls" challenge and ultimately placed as a runner-up. In 2020, she came back to Dragula to participate in the Halloween special The Boulet Brothers' Dragula: Resurrection, where past contestants competed to return for the fourth season of Dragula. Black placed in the Top 3, but chose to withdraw from the competition.

In 2022, Black was announced as a contestant for the inaugural season of The Boulet Brothers' Dragula: Titans. Winning three challenges, Black was the frontrunner of the competition, and won the season during episode 9. Following her win, she headlined the Boulet Brothers' Dragula: Titans world tour, making stops across the United States, Canada, and Australia.

== Personal life ==
Black has been diagnosed with autism spectrum disorder.

== Filmography ==
=== Television ===
- The Boulet Brothers' Dragula (season 2)
- The Boulet Brothers' Dragula: Titans
