= The Boulet Brothers' Dragula season 1 =

First season of 'The Boulet Brothers' Dragula'

The Boulet Brothers' Dragula
- Season 1
- Promotional poster for season one
- Hosted by: The Boulet Brothers
- Judges: Dracmorda Boulet; Swanthula Boulet
- No. of contestants: 9
- Winner: Vander Von Odd
- Runners-up: Frankie Doom; Melissa Befierce
- No. of episodes: 7

Release
- Original network: Hey Qween! (United States)
- Original release: 31 October 2016 – 20 February 2017

Season chronology
- Next → Season 2

The first season of The Boulet Brothers' Dragula premiered on the Hey Qween streaming service on October 31, 2016, and concluded on February 20, 2017. The series featured nine contestants, from all over California, competing for the title of World's First Drag Supermonster and a cash prize of $10,000. Guest judges included director Darren Stein, and drag performers Peaches Christ and Heklina. It ran for seven episodes, including a special episode incorporating unutilized footage. The season was subsequently remastered, and was distributed by OutTv, Amazon Prime, and SBS Viceland.

The winner of first season of The Boulet Brothers' Dragula was Vander Von Odd, with Frankie Doom and Melissa Befierce as the runner-up. Frankie Doom and Loris returned later to compete in The Boulet Brothers' Dragula: Resurrection, a competition between contestants from previous seasons of Dragula, with the winner returning for the fourth season of Dragula.

== Contestants ==
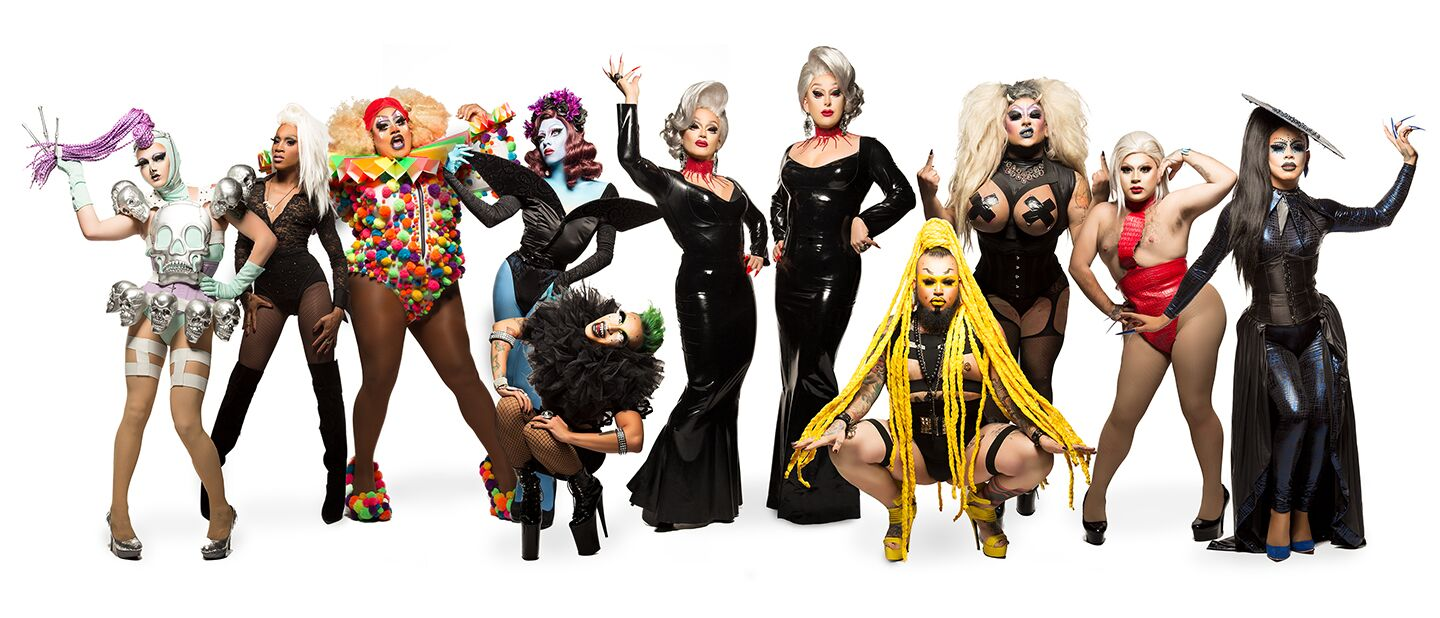
The Boulet Brothers and the cast of the first season of Dragula.

Ages, names, and cities stated are at time of filming.

Contestants of The Boulet Brothers' Dragula season 1 and their backgrounds
Contestant	Age	Hometown (Note: All the contestants resided in the Los Angeles area during filming.)	Outcome
Vander Von Odd	22	Los Angeles, California	Winner
Frankie Doom	31	Los Angeles, California	Runners-up
Melissa Befierce	31	Los Angeles, California	Runners-up
Meatball	27	Los Angeles, California	4th place
Loris (Note: Loris Volkle is referred to as Loris on the show.)	21	Los Angeles, California	5th place
Xochi Mochi	29	Los Angeles, California	5th place
Foxie Adjuia	23	Los Angeles, California	7th place
Ursula Major	27	Los Angeles, California	8th place
Pinche Queen (Note: Now known as Dallas Tetas, she was referred to as Pinche Queen on the show.)	22	Los Angeles, California	9th place

== Contestant progress ==
Legend:

Vander Von Odd won The Boulet Brothers' Dragula season 1.
Frankie Doom and Melissa Befierce were the runners-up.
WIN indicates that the contestant won the challenge.
WUE (Winner up for extermination) indicates that the contestant won the challenge but was still up for extermination.
SAFE indicates that the contestant was declared safe by the judges.
BTM (Bottom) indicates that the contestant was up for extermination.
EXT (Exterminated) indicates that the contestant was exterminated.
Guest indicates the contestant returned as a guest.

Contestants progress with placements in each episode
Contestant	Episode					
Contestant	1	2	3	4	5	6
Vander Von Odd	WIN	SAFE	WUE	BTM	SAFE	Winner
Frankie Doom	SAFE	BTM	SAFE	BTM	SAFE	Runner-up
Melissa Befierce	SAFE	BTM	WIN	SAFE	SAFE	Runner-up
Meatball	BTM	SAFE	SAFE	WIN	EXT	Guest
Loris	BTM	WIN	BTM	EXT		Guest
Xochi Mochi	SAFE	BTM	SAFE	EXT		Guest
Foxie Adjuia	SAFE	SAFE	EXT			Guest
Ursula Major	SAFE	EXT				Guest
Pinche Queen	EXT					

== Exterminations ==
The contestant was exterminated after their first time in the bottom.
The contestant was exterminated after their second time in the bottom.
The contestant was exterminated after their third time in the bottom.
The contestant was exterminated after the final challenge of the season.

Episode	Contestants			Challenge	Exterminated
1	Loris vs. Meatball vs. Pinche Queen			Buried alive in a coffin with bugs, water and dirt thrown at their faces	Pinche Queen
2 (Note: Melissa Befierce was declared safe after participating in the extermination challenge, but before the final judgment.)	Frankie Doom	vs.	Ursula Major	Wrestle aggressively and in character in a pool of mud	Ursula Major
2	Melissa Befierce	vs.	Xochi Mochi	Wrestle aggressively and in character in a pool of mud	Ursula Major
3	Foxie Adjuia vs. Loris vs. Vander Von Odd			Eat as much pig brains as possible without using their hands	Foxie Adjuia
4 (Note: In this episode, all contestants participated in the extermination, but Meatball and Melissa Befierce were declared safe after the extermination challenge.)	Frankie Doom vs. Loris vs. Vander Von Odd vs. Xochi Mochi			Lip sync to Alaska's "Nails" while the other queens throw objects at them.	Loris
4	Frankie Doom vs. Loris vs. Vander Von Odd vs. Xochi Mochi			Lip sync to Alaska's "Nails" while the other queens throw objects at them.	Xochi Mochi
5 (Note: In this episode, all contestants had to compete in the extermination.)	Frankie Doom vs. Meatball vs. Melissa Befierce vs. Vander Von Odd			Create a seamonster look and endure a drag photoshoot in the San Francisco Bay	Meatball

== Guest judges ==
Episode	Guest Judges
1	Darren Stein, film director, screenwriter and producer
2	Magnus Hastings, photographer
4	BibleGirl, drag entertainer and internet personality
5	Heklina, drag entertainer Peaches Christ, drag entertainer

== Episode summary ==
Episode	Title	Original airdate	Episode summary
1	Wickedest Witch	October 31, 2016	Floor Show Challenge: Design a wicked witch outfit and reenact the death of the Wicked Witch of the West; Floor Show Winner: Vander von Odd Extermination Challenge: Being buried alive while in a coffin as bugs, water and dirt are thrown in your face Participants: Loris, Meatball, and Pinche Queen; Exterminated: Pinche Queen
2	80's Female Wrestler	November 14, 2016	Floor Show Challenge: Design an 80's inspired wrestler look and perform a wrestling show Floor Show Winner: Loris Extermination Challenge: Wrestle in a pool of mud aggressively while remaining in character Participants: Frankie Doom, Melissa Befierce, Ursula Major, and Xochi Mochi; Exterminated: Ursula Major
3	Zombies in Death Valley	November 28, 2016	Floor Show Challenge: Design a zombie look in Death Valley for their rotten runway and showcase their zombie acting Floor Show Winners: Melissa Befierce and Vander von Odd Extermination Challenge: Eat as much pig brains as possible without using hands Participants: Foxie Adjuia, Loris, and Vander von Odd; Exterminated: Foxie Adjuia
4	Pretty, Pink, Fishy Drag	December 12, 2016	Floor Show Challenge: Showcase a “pretty in pink” drag Floor Show Winner: Meatball Extermination Challenge: Perform a lip sync to Alaska Thunderfuck's song "Nails" while the other queens attempt to distract the performer by throwing food and other objects Participants: All remaining contestants but only Frankie Doom, Loris, Vander von Odd, and Xochi Mochi were eligible for extermination Exterminated: Loris and Xochi Mochi
5	Trannyshack Club	January 2, 2017	Floor Show Challenge: Perform at the club Trannyshack in San Francisco Extermination Challenge: Create a seamonster look, and endure a drag photoshoot in the cold San Francisco Bay; Participants: All remaining contestants Exterminated: Meatball
6	Finale	January 16, 2017	Floor Show Challenge: Interpret and design three outfits with the principles of Dragula: glamour, filth, and horror Floor Show Prize: $10,000 and the title of First Drag Supermonster; Winner: Vander von Odd
7	Secrets of Dragula: Lost Footage	February 20, 2017	Clip show featuring behind-the-scenes footage and casting videos
—	Reunion	March 20, 2017	The entire cast reunite on an episode of Hey Qween! on YouTube with hosts Jonny McGovern and Lady Red Couture
