= Boulet Brothers =

American drag artists

The Boulet Brothers
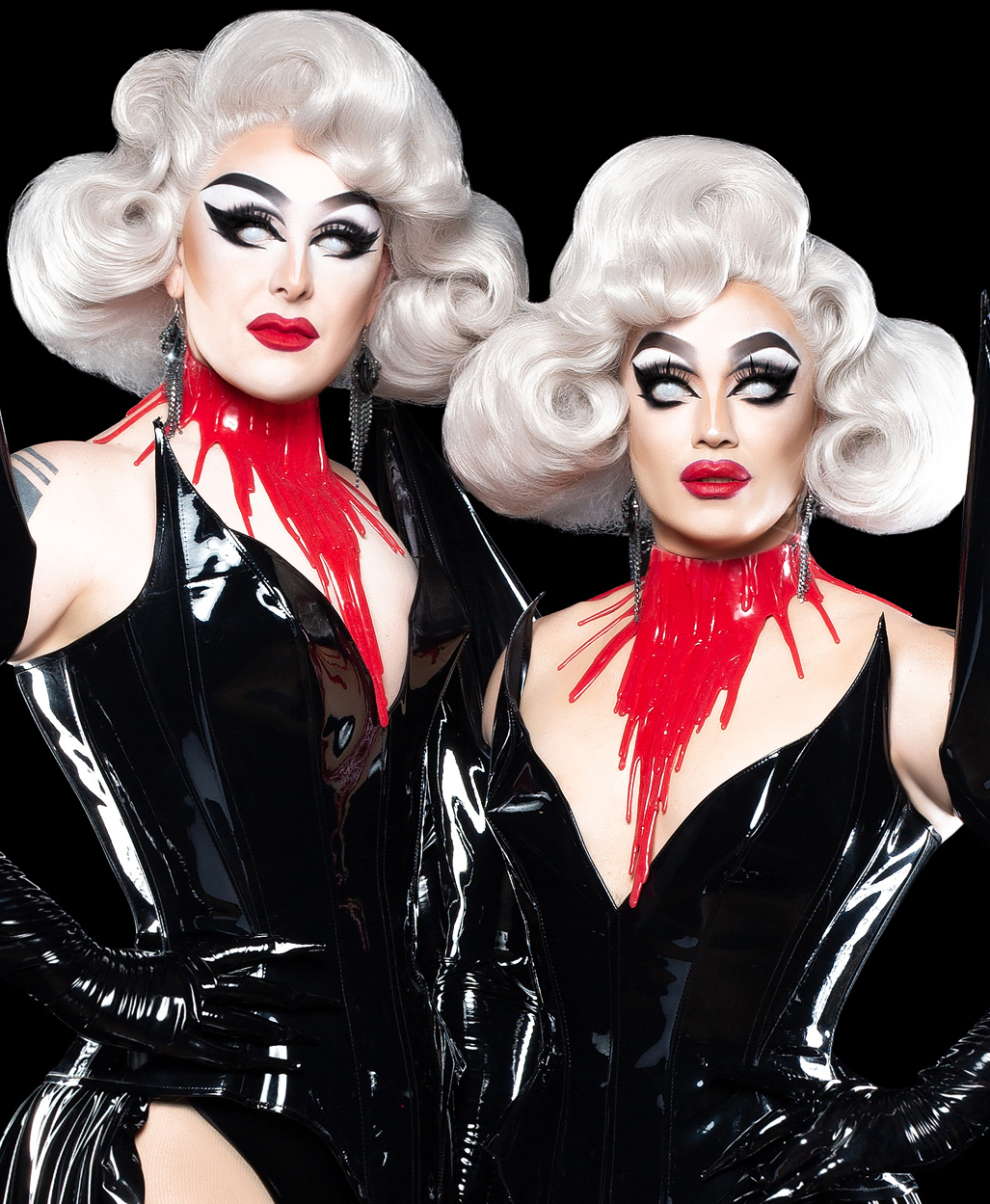
- The Boulet Brothers in 2019; L–R: Dracmorda and Swanthula Boulet
- Occupations: Drag artists; television personalities; television hosts; writers; directors; executive producers
- Television: The Boulet Brothers' Dragula; The Boulet Brothers' Dragula: Titans; The Boulet Brothers' Dragula: Resurrection; The Boulet Brothers' Halfway to Halloween TV Special
- Website: bouletbrothersdragula.com

The Boulet Brothers (Dracmorda and Swanthula Boulet) are drag artists, television personalities, writers, producers and modern day horror hosts. They were featured on the cover of Fangoria as "Horror's New Icons" in 2022. Their projects have included horror themed television shows, music, live nightlife productions, books, movies, and comic books. Since 2016 the Boulet Brothers have produced and starred in the reality competition series The Boulet Brothers' Dragula, which features contestants showcasing dark, horror-themed drag looks.

In addition to their television work, the Boulet Brothers appear as guests, performers, and emcees at horror conventions, nightclubs, and other live events. The Boulets are considered prolific nightclub producers with a career creating nightlife events. The Boulet Brothers have developed a close fan-base due to their acceptance of non-mainstream drag personas.

== Television career ==
=== The Boulet Brothers' Dragula ===
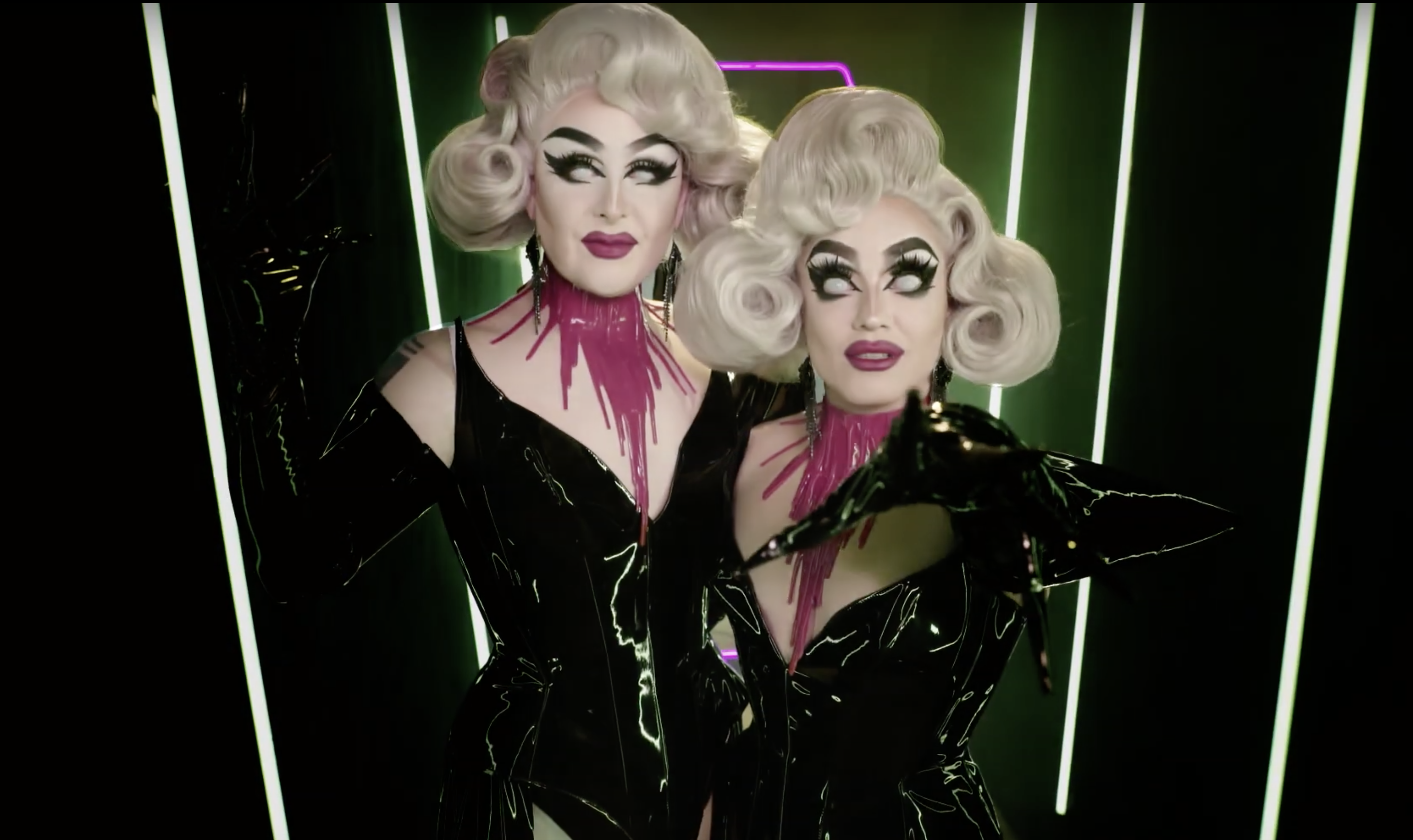
Still from The Boulet Brothers' Dragula season 3

The Boulet Brothers are most known for their reality TV competition series The Boulet Brothers' Dragula. The show is currently streaming on Shudder, and it has seven seasons. The show has received international praise for its creativity, talent and diversity. It is the most watched series on Shudder. The Boulet Brothers serve as the showrunners, executive producers and hosts of the show.

=== The Boulet Brothers' Dragula: Resurrection ===
The Boulet Brothers wrote, produced and co-directed a spin-off film titled Boulet Brothers' Dragula: Resurrection, which Digital Spy described as "part-horror movie, part-documentary and part-reality competition." The film was released as an original film on AMC Networks' Shudder streaming service on October 20, 2020.

=== The Boulet Brothers' Dragula: Titans ===
In August 2022, it was announced that the Boulet Brothers would be producing and hosting a spinoff of Dragula and an upcoming television special for AMC. The spinoff Boulet Brothers' Dragula: Titans premiered on October 25. The series was praised for its production quality and the introduction of "fright feat" mini-challenges. On October 7, 2025 a second season of Titans premiered.

=== The Boulet Brothers' Halfway to Halloween TV Special ===
The Boulet Brothers' Halfway to Halloween TV special is a scripted variety show that premiered on AMC+ and Shudder on April 25, 2023, written and directed by the Boulet Brothers. The show was hosted by the Boulet Brothers in their horror host roles, and featured skits featuring notable celebrities from the horror genre including Kevin Smith, Matthew Lillard, David Dastmalchian, Rachel True, Barbara Crampton and Taran Killam. The special was widely praised by critics, with Bloody Disgusting describing it as "a delightfully ghoulish good time", and "an evening that exists in that special place on the border of comedy and tragedy, of camp and creepy, of horror and humor" by Hollywood Life.

=== Other television appearances ===
The Boulet Brothers were guests on Behind the Monsters, a docuseries on the history of horror icons such as Chucky, Michael Myers, and Pinhead. They were also guests on "Heartbreak Trailer Park", a special episode of the series The Last Drive-in with Joe Bob Briggs. In the episode they discussed topics such as love and the horror genre with Joe Bob Briggs.

In 2023, it was announced that the Boulet Brothers were working on an upcoming television production with Blumhouse Productions.

== Podcasts ==
=== Creatures of the Night Podcast ===
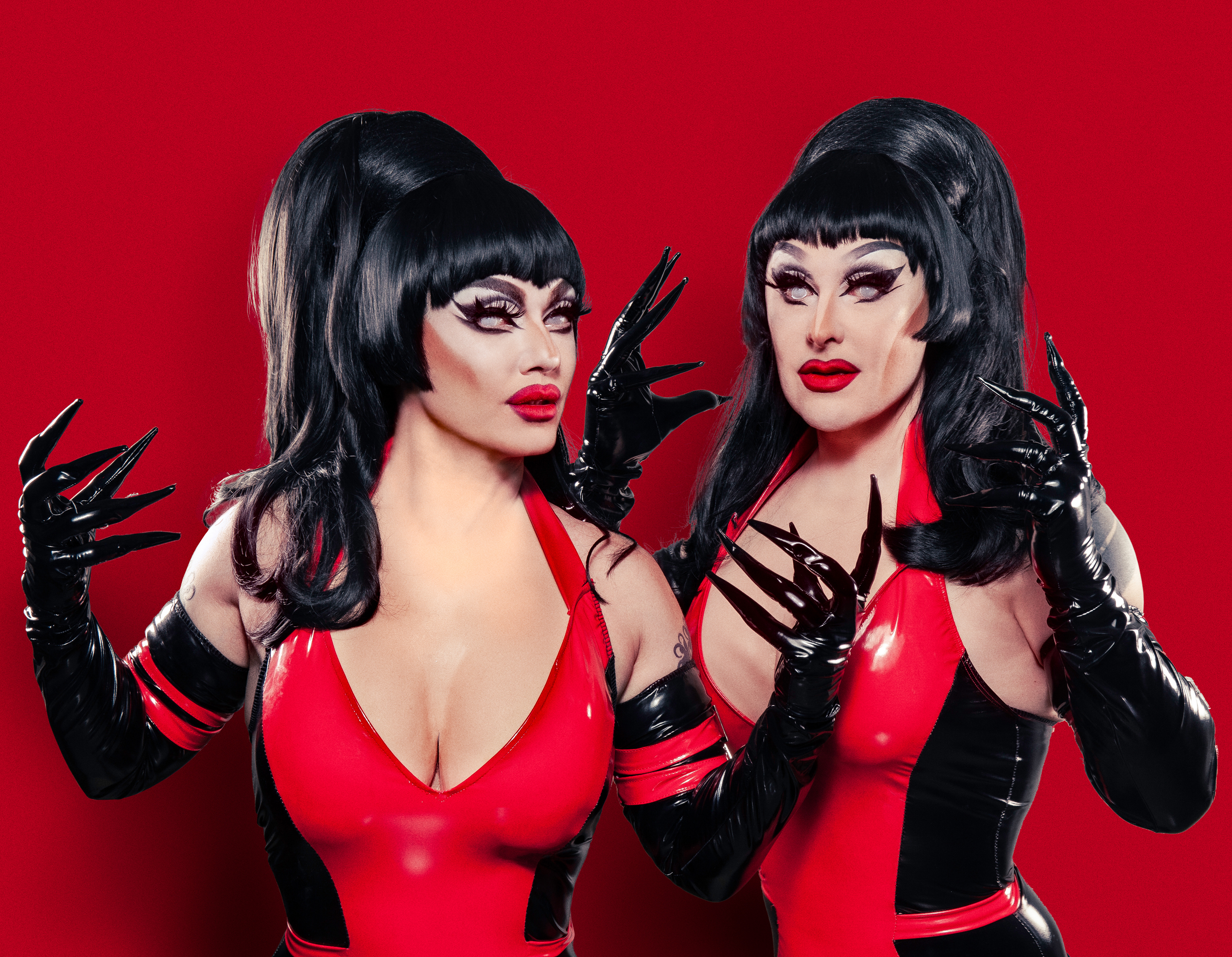
Creatures of the Night promo poster

The Boulet Brothers are the executive producers and hosts of Dread Central's (previously Fangoria's) The Boulet Brothers' Creatures of the Night Podcast. The show is co-hosted by Ian Devoglaer, the supervising producer of The Boulet Brothers' Dragula. The podcast is a horror variety show styled after a 1940s style radio program. Each episode offers an introductory dialogue, a newscast and discussion of entertainment news, a horror movie review, and listener questions. The show's "Haunting of History" segment revisits famous historical hauntings. Other segments of the podcast include celebrity interviews and literary discussions called "Swanthula's Book Nook". Guests include Rose McGowan, Poppy, Dita Von Teese, Rachel True, Darren Stein, Yvie Oddly, Katya Zamolodchikova, and Lin Shaye. Books discussed include Stephen King's "Children of the Corn", Clive Barker's The Hellbound Heart, and Brian Lumley's Necroscope.

== Dragula Live Tour ==
The Boulet Brothers present the Dragula Live Tour, a series of live performances featuring contestants from the Dragula series. The Boulet Brothers described the show as "a little bit of filth, and a lot of glamour and a little bit of shock. And maybe get covered in blood a little bit. It's gonna be a little messy." The United Kingdom leg of the Dragula Season 4 World tour began at Clapham Grand in London in March, and performed in cities such as Glasgow, Manchester, Brighton, Leeds, Nottingham and Birmingham. The United States leg of the Dragula tour began on April 27, 2022, and ended on June 2, 2022.

The Season 4 World tour sold out, and received positive reviews from critics. Chris Selman of Gay Times praised the show, writing that "four diverse and engaging performers, a pair of enigmatic hosts, a rock band routine and an audience challenge to throw in some variety, and impressive production values." He concluded that "this twisted troupe present quite the macabre drag variety show." Alex Warren of Horror Press had similar praise for the tour, writing that it had "otherworldly performances" and "sleek and sexy production values."

They also presented the Boulet Brothers' Dragula: Titans Tour, which tours in the United States, Canada and Australia. It began its tour on April 8, 2023.

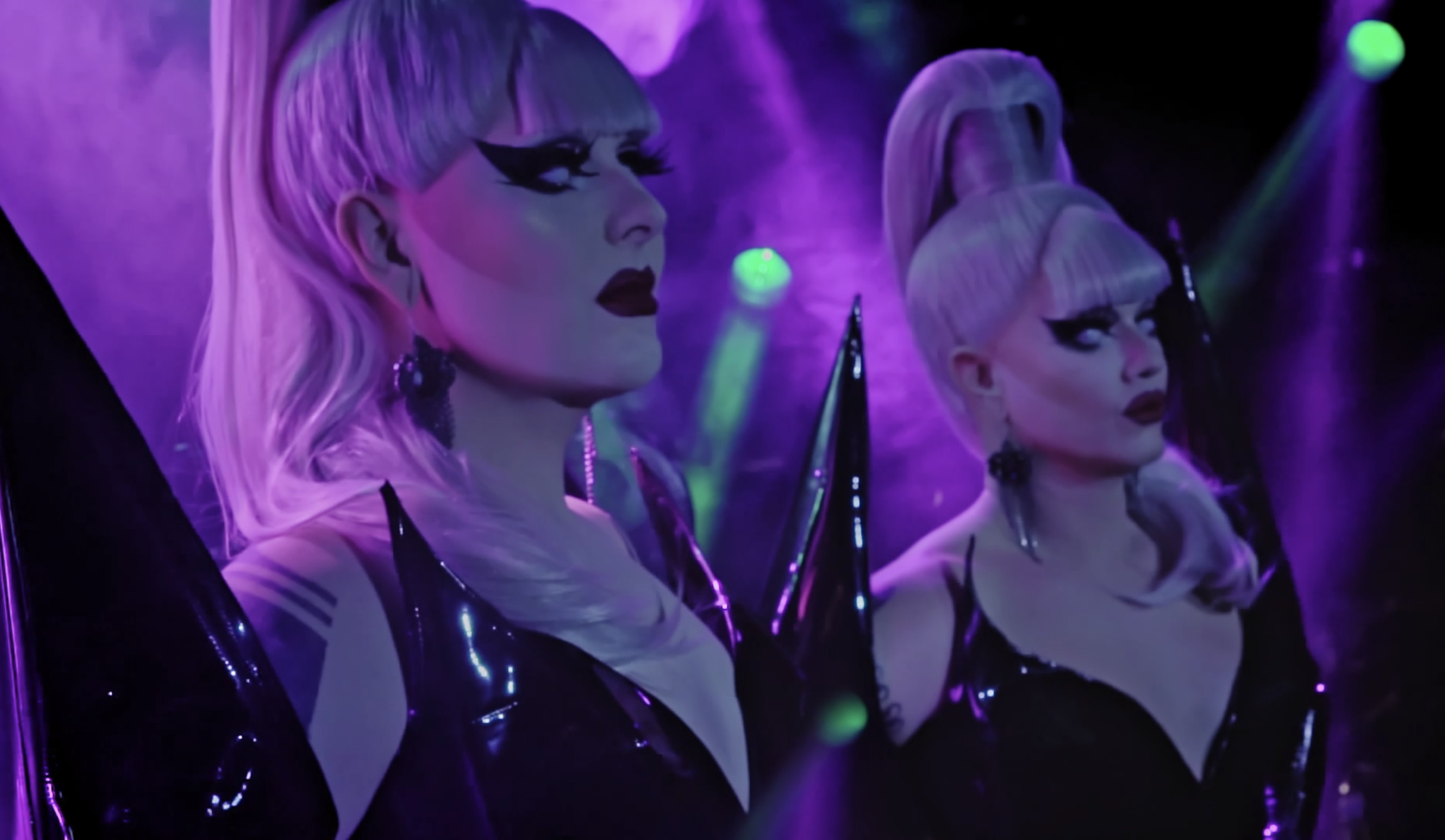
Still from The Boulet Brothers's Dragula: Titans

== Comic books and print publication ==
The Boulet Brothers got their start in the comic book industry, and they write and produce comic book content. They hosted a special "Halloween Takeover" issue of Heavy Metal (Issue #311) in 2021. Longtime fans of Heavy Metal, they described hosting the issue as a "full circle moment" that tied together their love of comic books, horror and drag. The issue, which was co-edited by Morgan Rosenblum and Steve Orlando, features subversive horror stories written by Orlando, Axelle Carolyn, and Alaska Thunderfuck 5000, among others. "The Vault of Saumagotha – Part Two", one of the stories included in the issue, was co-written by and about the Boulet Brothers. The Boulet Brothers had first announced their intention to work on a comic book with Orlando on the Creatures of the Night podcast in 2020.

The issue was well received for its writing, themes and art. Jeff Robertson of Screen Rant said that the book "unleash[es] their unique blend of seductive and irreverent terror on the unsuspecting public."

The Boulet Brothers contributed one of two stories that appeared in DC Horror Presents... #1 in 2024. Their story, in which Wonder Woman faces off against an undead threat, was praised by reviewers. Nathan Simmons of AIPT called it "an intense, action-packed segment that gives us just about as much pathos as it does gory action". They also wrote the story "Granny Hags from Hell!" for Hello Darkness #10 from Boom! Studios.

The Boulets remind us of the connection between many of cinema's early monster movies and the suppression of any overt LGBTQ+ representation on screen. — Steve Holden, BBC

== Public image ==
The Boulet Brothers are noted figures in the queer and horror communities, and have been considered "pivotal pioneers for alternative drag." They were featured on the cover of horror magazine Fangoria Vol. 2, Issue #13. Their distinctive style often incorporates colored contact lenses and matching outfits. Many of their looks are inspired by classic horror films, femme fatales, punk fashion, and villains from film, comic books and television series. Rue Morgue's Carly Maga described them as "the unofficial lords of the underworld of drag performance, instantly recognizable by their matching gothic, otherworldly looks; the high-glam drag lovechildren of Anna Wintour, a Cenobite, and the Grady twins."

== Music ==
The Boulet Brothers' released their debut EP titled Time to Die in October 2021. The EP consists of four original songs including "Wicked Love" which was created for The Boulet Brothers' Dragula season 4 Episode 5 challenge. The Boulet Brothers' also released an instrumental Official Boulet Brothers' Dragula Season 4 Soundtrack in December 2021. The soundtrack features the floorshow music and main thematic tracks used in the fourth season of the show.

The Boulet Brothers EP Halloween House Party was released through Producer Entertainment Group on October 4, 2024. The EP has six tracks, including the single "All Hallows' Eve". It has been described as a combination of surf rock, 1960s pop, psychobilly, and electronica. The Boulet Brothers' described it as an homage to "classic vintage Halloween decorations, sets, costumes, parties, music".

== Video games ==
The Boulet Brothers are the first horror hosts to appear in the survival horror game Dead by Daylight. The "Boulet Brothers Artist" outfit for the character The Artist was added as a part of a Boulet Brothers DLC on July 8, 2025. The DLC included other skins and in-game items based on the Dragula series.

== Awards and nominations ==
In 2022, the Boulet Brothers were included on the Out100, a list of the most impactful LGBT people. They were also ranked among Out100's "Drag Artists of the Year". The Boulet Brothers won the award for "Best Makeup" at the Make-Up Artists and Hair Stylists Guild Awards 2022.

The Boulet Brothers have been included on the FYC ballot for the Primetime Emmy Award for Outstanding Host for a Reality or Competition Program in 2022 and 2023. The Boulet Brothers' Dragula has also been on the ballot for the Primetime Emmy Award for Outstanding Reality Competition Program.

=== Emmy Awards ===
The Emmy Awards are awarded annually by the National Academy of Television Arts and Sciences. The Boulet Brothers have been nominated twice.

Year	Award	Nominated work	Result
2024	Outstanding Makeup For A Variety, Nonfiction Or Reality Program	The Boulet Brothers' Dragula	Nominated
2025	Outstanding Makeup For A Variety, Nonfiction Or Reality Program	The Boulet Brothers' Dragula	Nominated

== Personal lives ==
Swanthula was born in Greece and her family later emigrated in Connecticut, while Dracmorda is originally from the Southern United States. They met in New York City through mutual friends while Swan was in college for art at School of Visual Arts. The couple do not appear out of drag on television or in interviews and lead private personal lives. They have stated in interviews that they are not brothers but romantic partners.

== Filmography ==
=== Television ===
Year	Title	Genre	Role	Notes
2016–present	The Boulet Brothers' Dragula	TV	Main judges	Also directors, producers, and writers
2020	The Boulet Brothers' Dragula: Resurrection	TV special	Main judges	Also directors, producers, and writers; 1 episode
2021	Behind the Monsters	TV docuseries	Themselves	Guests; 5 episodes
2022	The Last Drive-in with Joe Bob Briggs	TV	Themselves	Guests; 1 episode
2022–present	The Boulet Brothers' Dragula: Titans	TV	Main judges	
2023	Halfway to Halloween	TV special	Hosts	Also producers; 1 episode

=== Web Series ===
Year	Title	Role	Notes
2014	Transformations	Guests	Episode: "The Boulet Brothers"

== Discography ==
All credits are adapted from Spotify and Apple Music.

=== Soundtrack albums ===
List of soundtrack albums
Title	Album details
Dragula: Season 4 Soundtrack	Released: January 7, 2022; Label: Producer Entertainment Group; Formats: digital download, streaming; Track listing: 1. "Meet Our Monsters"; 2. "Boulet Brothers Entrance Theme"; 3. "Titans of Terror"; 4. "Welcome to the Weird Wild West"; 5. "Metal For The Gods"; 6. "A Ravenous Pack"; 7. "Bind the Demons"; 8. "Filth Theme"; 9. "Horror Theme"; 10. "The Crowning"; 11. "Dragula Theme Song"
Dragula: Titans Soundtrack	Released: December 20, 2022; Label: Producer Entertainment Group; Formats: Digital download, streaming; Track listing: 1. "Sea Monsters"; 2. "Basic Bitch Zombie Prom"; 3. "Dungeons and Drag Queens"; 4. "Horror Icons"; 5. "Sci-Fi Horror"; 6. "Ugly Ladies of Wrestling"
Dragula: Season 5 Soundtrack	Released: January 17, 2024; Label: Producer Entertainment Group; Formats: digital download, streaming; Track listing: 1. "Gods of Death"; 2. "Terror in the Woods"; 3. "Trash Can Children"; 4. "Metal For The Gods"; 5. "Horror Theme"; 6. "Sci-Fi Horror"; 7. "Dragula Theme Song"

=== Extended plays ===
Title	Album details
Time To Die	Released: December 17, 2021; Label: Producer Entertainment Group; Formats: 10-inch vinyl, digital download, streaming; Track listing: 1. "Time To Die"; 2. "Wicked Love"; 3. "No Need To Argue"; 4. "R.I.P."
Halloween House Party	Released: October 4, 2024; Label: Producer Entertainment Group; Track listing: 1. "Requiem for Halloween"; 2. "All Hallows' Eve"; 3. "Ghost Train"; 4. "Nosferatu Beach Party"; 5. "Trick or Treat"; 6. "The Vampire Song"

=== Singles ===
==== As lead artist ====
List of singles
Title	Year	Album	Writer(s)	Producer(s)
“All Hallows’ Eve”	2024	Non-album single	Ashley Gordon, Dracmorda Boulet, Swanthula Boulet, Tomas Costanza, Tyler Connaghan	Tomas Costanza, Ashley Gordon
"Gods of Death"	2023	Boulet Brothers' Dragula: Season 5 Soundtrack	Ashley Levy, Dracmorda Boulet, Paul Coultrup, Swanthula Boulet, Tomas Costanza	Tomas Costanza
"Ascension"	2022	Non-album single	Ashley Levy, Dracmorda Boulet, Paul Coultrup, Swanthula Boulet, Tomas Costanza	Tomas Costanza
"Wicked Love"	2021	Time To Die	Ashley Levy, Dracmorda Boulet, Paul Coultrup, Swanthula Boulet, Tomas Costanza	Tomas Costanza
"Time To Die"	2021	Time To Die	Ashley Levy, Dracmorda Boulet, Paul Coultrup, Swanthula Boulet, Tomas Costanza	Tomas Costanza

== Bibliography ==
- Doonan, Simon. 2019. Drag: The Complete Story. Laurence King Publishing. ISBN 978-1-78627-423-6
