= Vander Von Odd =

American drag performer

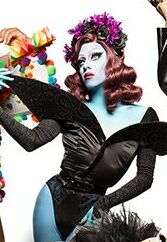
- Vander Von Odd in promotional artwork for season 1 of The Boulet Brothers' Dragula, 2016
- Born: Antonio Yee; Calexico, California, USA
- Television: The Boulet Brothers' Dragula (season 1); NightGowns
- Website: vandervonodd.com

Vander Von Odd is the stage name of Antonio Yee, an American drag performer who won the first season of The Boulet Brothers' Dragula. She is based in Los Angeles, and has appeared in the series NightGowns.

== Early life ==
Van Odd was born in Calexico, California and was raised between the Mexico–United States border, spending weekdays attending school in the U.S. and weekends in Mexico with her grandmothers. She is of Mexican and Chinese descent and has cited Sylvia Rivera, Barbette, and Fakir Musafar as her inspirations.

== Career ==
In 2016, Vander Von Odd was announced as a contestant for the inaugural season of alternative drag competition show The Boulet Brothers' Dragula. Prior to Dragula, Von Odd had never been paid for a drag booking. In one episode of the series, she calls herself a "baby queen," but still expected herself to do well in the competition. Winning two challenges and maintaining her place as the front-runner of the competition, Von Odd won the season during episode 6.

In 2017, Von Odd began performing in RuPaul's Drag Race winner Sasha Velour's multimedia drag experience NightGowns. In 2019, the live show was announced to be adapted into a docuseries featuring Von Odd, which later aired in April 2020 on Quibi. She represented her monstrous, alternative style of drag through body modification, grotesque imagery, and emotional messages. Von Odd has continued to work with Velour in other NightGowns shows, as well as performing in VELOUR: A Drag Spectacular at La Jolla Playhouse.

In 2025, Vander Von Odd returned to Dragula for season 2 of The Boulet Brothers' Dragula: Titans as the season's Exorsister.

Outside of drag performance, Von Odd is a horror filmmaker and hosts a monthly Los Angeles movie screening night, "The Weird Sisters Cinema Club."

== Filmography ==
=== Music Videos ===
Year	Title	Artist	Reference
2020	Spark	Alice Bag	

=== Television ===
Year	Title	Role	Notes
2016-17	The Boulet Brothers' Dragula	Contestant	Winner (season 1, 7 episodes)
2017	The Boulet Brothers' Dragula	Herself	Guest judge (season 2, 2 episodes)
2019	The Boulet Brothers' Dragula	Herself	Guest judge (season 3, 1 episode)
2020	NightGowns	Herself	Episode 4
2025	The Boulet Brothers' Dragula: Titans	Herself	Exorsister (season 2, 3 episodes)

=== Web Series ===
Year	Title	Role	Notes
2017-2020	Transformations	Herself	Guest, 2 episodes
