= The Boulet Brothers' Dragula season 4 =

Fourth season of 'The Boulet Brothers' Dragula'

The Boulet Brothers' Dragula
- Season 4
- Promotional poster for season four
- Hosted by: The Boulet Brothers
- Judges: Dracmorda Boulet; Swanthula Boulet
- No. of contestants: 11
- Winner: Dahli
- Runners-up: HoSo Terra Toma; Saint; Sigourney Beaver
- No. of episodes: 10

Release
- Original network: Shudder (United States)
- Original release: 19 October – 21 December 2021

Season chronology
- ← Previous; Season 3 Next → Season 5

The fourth season of The Boulet Brothers' Dragula aired from October 19, 2021, and concluded on December 21, 2021, broadcast on Shudder across all territories, featuring 11 contestants competing for the title of World's Next Drag Supermonster and a cash prize of $100,000. Contestants in the season included RuPaul's Drag Race alumna Jade Jolie, season three contestant Saint, who earned a spot in the competition after winning The Boulet Brothers' Dragula: Resurrection special, and season two contestant Dahli, also a participant in the Resurrection special, the latter entered the competition from the second episode.

The winner of the fourth season of The Boulet Brothers' Dragula was Dahli, with HoSo Terra Toma, Saint and Sigourney Beaver as the runners-up.

== Contestants ==
Contestants of The Boulet Brothers' Dragula season 4 and their backgrounds
Contestant	Age	Hometown	Outcome
Dahli (Note: The Dahli is referred to as Dahli on the show.)	30	Phoenix, Arizona	Winner
HoSo Terra Toma	19	Seoul, South Korea	Runners-up
Saint (Note: Now known as Saint, she was referred to as St. Lucia on season 3.)	25	New York City, New York	Runners-up
Sigourney Beaver	29	Chicago, Illinois	Runners-up
La Zavaleta	24	New York City, New York	5th place
Jade Jolie	34	Louisville, Kentucky	6th place
Bitter Betty	40	Los Angeles, California	7th place
Merrie Cherry	38	New York City, New York	8th place
Koco Caine	26	Tulsa, Oklahoma	9th place
Astrud Aurelia	24	Phoenix, Arizona	10th place
Formelda Hyde	21	Phoenix, Arizona	11th place

== Contestant progress ==
Legend:

Dahli won The Boulet Brothers' Dragula season 4.
HoSo Terra Toma, Saint and Sigourney Beaver were the runners-up.
WIN indicates that the contestant won the challenge.
SAFE indicates that the contestant was declared safe by the judges.
KEY indicates that Jade Jolie obtained a key with the power of granting herself immunity or nominating a fellow contestant for the extermination, choosing to nominate Bitter Betty.
BTM (Bottom) indicates that the contestant was up for extermination.
EXT (Exterminated) indicates that the contestant was exterminated.
Guest indicates the contestant returned as a guest.

Progress of contestants including placements in each episode
Contestant	Episode									
Contestant	1	2	3	4	5	6	7	8	9	10
Dahli		SAFE	SAFE	WIN	SAFE	SAFE	BTM	WIN	Guest	Winner
HoSo Terra Toma	SAFE	SAFE	SAFE	SAFE	BTM	WIN	WIN	BTM	Guest	Runner-up
Saint	SAFE	WIN	BTM	SAFE	SAFE	SAFE	SAFE	BTM	Guest	Runner-up
Sigourney Beaver	SAFE	SAFE	SAFE	BTM	WIN	BTM	BTM	BTM	Guest	Runner-up
La Zavaleta	BTM	SAFE	WIN	SAFE	BTM	SAFE	EXT		Guest	
Jade Jolie	SAFE	SAFE	SAFE	BTM	KEY	EXT			Guest	
Bitter Betty	SAFE	BTM	SAFE	BTM	EXT			Guest	Guest	
Merrie Cherry	SAFE	SAFE	SAFE	EXT				Guest	Guest	
Koco Caine	SAFE	SAFE	EXT					Guest	Guest	
Astrud Aurelia	WIN	EXT						Guest	Guest	
Formelda Hyde	EXT							Guest	Guest	

== Exterminations ==
The contestant was exterminated after their first time in the bottom.
The contestant was exterminated after their second time in the bottom.
The contestant was exterminated after their third time in the bottom.

Episode	Contestants			Challenge	Exterminated
1	Formelda Hyde	vs.	La Zavaleta	Buried alive	Formelda Hyde
2	Astrud Aurelia	vs.	Bitter Betty	Submerge arms into leech infested waters	Astrud Aurelia
3 (Note: In this episode all contestants had to compete in extermination challenge, but only Koco Caine and Saint were up for extermination.)	Koco Caine	vs.	Saint	Ride a mechanical bull	Koco Caine
4	Bitter Betty vs. Jade Jolie vs. Merrie Cherry vs. Sigourney Beaver			Shock therapy on electric chairs	Merrie Cherry
5	Bitter Betty vs. HoSo Terra Toma vs. La Zavaleta			Photoshoot on a beach	Bitter Betty
6	Jade Jolie	vs.	Sigourney Beaver	Sit in cockroach-infested chambers	Jade Jolie
7	Dahli vs. La Zavaleta vs. Sigourney Beaver			Stay in vacuum-sealed latex for as long as possible	La Zavaleta
8 (Note: Although Dahli won the challenge and was safe, they were still required to participate in the extermination challenge.)	HoSo Terra Toma vs. Saint vs. Sigourney Beaver			Compete in a race in different vehicles	None

== Guest judges ==
Episode	Guest Judges
1	Tananarive Due, author and educator Darren Stein, film director, screenwriter and producer
2	Vanessa Hudgens, actress and singer GG Magree, music producer, DJ and singer
3	Trixie Mattel, drag entertainer, reality television personality, comedian, and singer/songwriter Orville Peck, country musician
4	Poppy, singer/songwriter and YouTuber; Rachel True, actress; known for their role in the film The Craft
5	Kristian Nairn, actor and DJ; Phil Nobile Jr., writer, producer, director, and editor-in-chief of Fangoria magazine
6	Bonnie Aarons, actress and writer Landon Cider, drag entertainer and winner of season 3
7	Ray Santiago, actor Misha Osherovich, actor, filmmaker, and activist; known for their role in the film Freaky
8	Bob the Drag Queen, drag entertainer, comedian, activist Harvey Guillén, actor; known for their role on What We Do in the Shadows

== Episode summary ==
Episode	Title	Original airdate	Episode summary
1	Horror Icons Reimagined	October 19, 2021	Fright Feat Challenge (Maze of Terror): Make it to the end of a maze-like haunted house; failure to finish will result in instant extermination from the competition. Fright Feat Prize: A deluxe, state-of-the-art special effects make-up kit from PPI and Skin Illustrator; Fright Feat Winners: All 10 contestants Floor Show Challenge (Horror Icon Make-up Challenge): Choose a classic horror icon and re-imagine their looks from the ground up in an entirely new, fresh and terrifying way. The icon can be from film, television, books, comic books, or video games.: Astrud Aurelia chose the Xenomorph from the Alien film series; Bitter Betty chose Elvira from the film Elvira: Mistress of the Dark; Formelda Hyde chose Billy the Puppet from the Saw film series; HoSo Terra Toma chose The Beldam (AKA Other Mother) from the novella Coraline and film of the same name; Jade Jolie chose Sarah Sanderson from Hocus Pocus; Koco Caine chose Morticia Addams from The Addams Family; La Zavaleta chose the Pale Man from Pan's Labyrinth; Merrie Cherry chose the Stay-Puft Marshmallow Man from the Ghostbusters film series; Saint chose Leatherface from The Texas Chainsaw Massacre film series; Sigourney Beaver chose the Bride of Frankenstein.; Floor Show Prize: $1,000 in high heels, shoes, or boots from FierceQueen.com; Floor Show Winner: Astrud Aurelia Extermination Challenge: The contestants must be buried alive in a coffin and remain inside as bugs, water and dirt are dropped onto their faces. Originally seen on Season 1. Participants: Formelda Hyde and La Zavaleta; Exterminated: Formelda Hyde
2	Nosferatu Beach Party	October 26, 2021	Fright Feat Challenge: Eat an entire head of garlic and drink a glass of pig's blood. Fright Feat Prize: Assign the roles and choose the teams for the lip-sync Floor Show performance Fright Feat Winner: La Zavaleta Floor Show Challenge: Design and create an original look for a midnight beach party for vampires only. Afterwards, model the design in a music video style lip-sync to "Gothic Surf-a-rama" by Vampire Beach Babes at the Floor Show. The lip-sync was performed in 5 teams of 2, assigned by the winner of the Fright Feat, La Zavaleta. The pairs were: La Zavaleta & Saint; Koco Caine & Merrie Cherry; Astrud Aurelia & Sigourney Beaver; HoSo Terra Toma & Dahli (making their return to the competition at the start of the episode); Bitter Betty & Jade Jolie; Floor Show Winner: Saint Extermination Challenge; The contestants must submerge their arms into an aquarium filled with leeches and allow them to feed off their blood. Participants: Astrud Aurelia and Bitter Betty; Exterminated: Astrud Aurelia
3	Weird, Wild, West	November 2, 2021	Floor Show Challenge; Conceptualize and create an original look based on the comic book inspired Weird Wild West theme. The look must contain both western themed influences as well as horror and science fiction tones. Afterward, the contestants must bring their characters to life on the main stage. Floor Show Prize: $1,000 shopping spree to Fright-Rags; Floor Show Winner: La Zavaleta Extermination Challenge; The contestants must ride a mechanical bull for as long as they can. Participants: All remaining contestants but only Koco Caine and Saint were eligible for extermination. Exterminated: Koco Caine
4	Monsters of Rock	November 9, 2021	Floor Show Challenge; Create monsters of rock performance. Floor Show Prize: Be featured in an upcoming issue of Heavy Metal Magazine; Floor Show Winner: Dahli Extermination Challenge; The contestants must choose which of their group member(s) to undergo shock therapy while strapped in to electric chairs. Participants: Bitter Betty, Jade Jolie, Merrie Cherry and Sigourney Beaver; Exterminated: Merrie Cherry
5	Ghostship Glamour	November 16, 2021	Fright Feat Challenge: Find a key hidden in the Boudoir; Fright Feat Prize: The ability to either save themselves from extermination or put another competitor up for extermination; Jade chose Bitter Betty; Fright Feat Winner: Jade Jolie Floor Show Challenge: Show off a glamorous sea-side spirit look and perform a lip-sync to the Boulet Brothers' new song "Wicked Love"; Floor Show Winner: Sigourney Beaver Extermination Challenge; Model on the shore next to the stormy ocean. Participants: Bitter Betty, HoSo Terra Toma, and La Zavaleta; Exterminated: Bitter Betty
6	Hairy Monsters!	November 23, 2021	Floor Show Challenge: Create a look inspired by hairy creatures Floor Show Prize: $1,000 Arda Wigs shopping spree Floor Show Winner: HoSo Terra Toma Extermination Challenge; Stand in the Laboratory and get covered in cockroaches. Participants: Jade Jolie and Sigourney Beaver; Exterminated: Jade Jolie
7	Exorsisters	November 30, 2021	Fright Feat Challenge: Recreate Peaches Christ's eyebrows. Fright Feat Prize: Assign the roles for the acting performance Fright Feat Winner: La Zavaleta Floor Show Challenge: Star in their own horror film Floor Show Prize: Featured in movie produced by Dread; Floor Show Winner: HoSo Terra Toma Extermination Challenge; Be vacuum sealed head to toe in latex chamber Participants: Dahli, La Zavaleta and Sigourney Beaver; Exterminated: La Zavaleta
8	Killer Clowns	December 7, 2021	Fright Feat Challenge: Dunk Tank your competitors. Fright Feat Prize: Assign the car keys for extermination. Fright Feat Winner: Dahli Floor Show Challenge: Create a look inspired by killer clowns Floor Show Prize: Star in The Boulet Brothers' Dragula World Tour; Floor Show Winner: Dahli Extermination Challenge; Obstacle course with clowns Participants: Dahli, Hoso Terra Toma, Saint and Sigourney Beaver; Exterminated: None
9	Last Supper	December 14, 2021	A reunion episode, where it was revealed that Dahli, Sigourney Beaver, Saint, and Hoso Terra Toma advanced it to the finale.
10	Finale	December 21, 2021	Floor Show Challenge: Create one look each for glamour, horror, and filth, with the glamour look being a lip sync to "Change the Paradigm" by Austra. Floor Show Prize: The title of the World's Next Drag Supermonster and $100,000; Winner: Dahli
