= The Boulet Brothers' Dragula: Titans =

Titans season of 'The Boulet Brothers' Dragula'

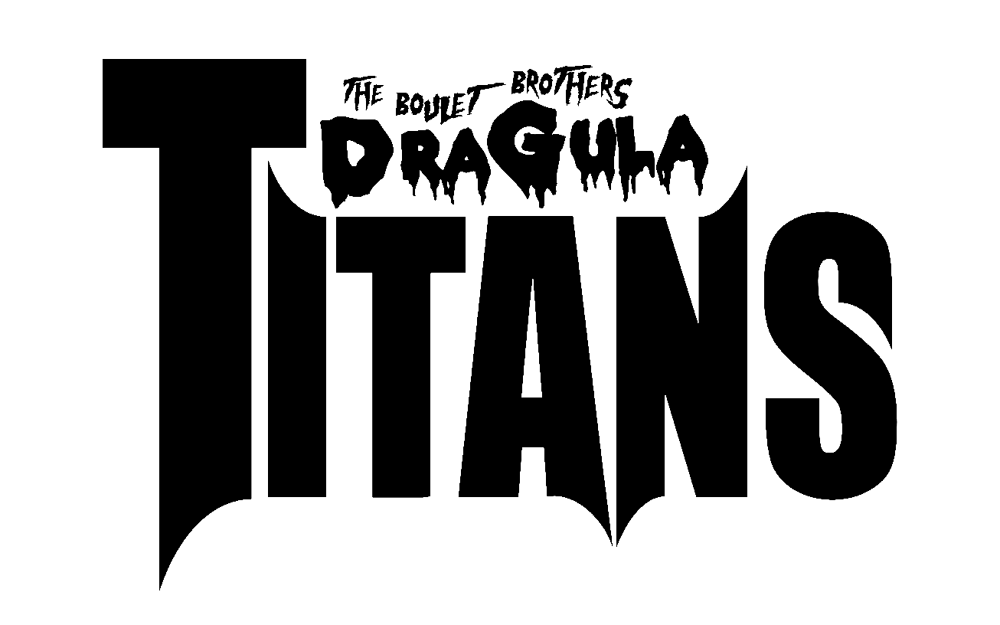
- Genre: Reality competition
- Created by: The Boulet Brothers
- Directed by: Nathan Noyes
- Judges: The Boulet Brothers
- Country of origin: United States
- Original language: English
- No. of seasons: 2
- No. of episodes: 19

Production
- Executive producers: The Boulet Brothers; David Sigurani; Craig Engler; Emily Gotto; Nicholas Lazo; Samuel Zimmerman
- Editors: Nathan Noyes; KC Lindley; Linna Boonklun; Matt Hardy
- Camera setup: Multiple
- Running time: 60-95 minutes
- Production company: Boulet Brothers Productions

Original release
- Network: Shudder
- Release: October 25, 2022 – present

Related
- The Boulet Brothers' Dragula

The Boulet Brothers' Dragula: Titans is an American reality competition spin off edition of the original series of the same name, which is produced by the Boulet Brothers, for Shudder.

The show documents past queens from the original series returning to compete at the invitation of the Boulet Brothers. As in the original series, the Boulet Brothers plays the role of hosts, mentors, and head judges and contestants are given different challenges each week. The Boulet Brothers' Dragula: Titans employs a panel of several guest judges who, along with the hosts, critique contestants' progress throughout the competition. The winner of each season is awarded a cash prize and the title of Queen of the Underworld, formerly known as The World's Next Drag Supermonster.

The series was announced on September 12, 2022, and the cast for the first season was revealed on September 26, featuring 10 contestants returning from the first four seasons of Dragula. The series premiered on October 25, 2022. The second season premiered on October 7, 2025.

== Format ==
For the most part, the format of Titans resembles that of the main series – each episode opens with a scripted scene starring the Boulet Brothers that introduces the episode's theme and challenge which determines who is eligible for elimination). However, each cast is composed of former contestants and the format for the competition is altered.

Each episode opens with a scripted scene starring the Boulet Brothers that introduces the episode's theme and challenge. The rest of the episode is filmed in a reality TV documentary format. Each episode will open with a fright feat (mini challenge), the winner of whom will get a reward or perk for the main challenge. If someone fails to do the extermination challenge, they are exterminated and replaced by the previously eliminated competitor.

Each episode features a main "Floor Show" where each of the competitors display their looks and performance on the main stage. The performances and looks are judged, and one competitor is chosen the winner while the two or more lowest scoring competitors are put up for "extermination". Unlike the main series, rather than featuring an extermination of the bottom two to determine the eliminated contestant, the Boulets announce the bottom contestants, then send the contestants to the cauldron, to then announce the exterminated competitor.

== Judges ==
The Boulet Brothers serve as the primary judges on the show, and are the only regular judges on the panel. Each episode they are joined by a rotating cast of celebrity musicians, directors, writers and horror alumni including Cassandra Peterson, Justin Simien, Bonnie Aarons, Darren Stein, David Dastmalchian, Misha Osherovich, Poppy, Harvey Guillén, and Joe Bob Briggs. Guests judges also starred several drag performers – including winners from the main series and its spin-offs, as well as those from the Drag Race franchise – such as Alaska Thunderfuck 5000, Dahli and Katya Zamolodchikova.

Main judges on The Boulet Brothers' Dragula
Judge	Season	
Judge	1	2
Judge	2022	2025
Dracmorda Boulet	Main	Main
Swanthula Boulet	Main	Main

== Series overview ==
Season	Contestants	Episodes	Originally released			Winner	Runners-up	Exorsister	Prizes
Season	Contestants	Episodes	First released	Last released	Network	Winner	Runners-up	Exorsister	Prizes
1	10	9	25 October 2022	19 December 2022	Shudder	Victoria Black	HoSo Terra Toma; Koco Caine	Koco Caine	$100,000; A deluxe crown and scepter package from Fierce Drag Jewels; A headlining spot on the 2023 Dragula World Tour; The title of "The Ultimate Titan of Dragula"
2	14	10	7 October 2025	9 December 2025	Shudder; AMC+	Evah Destruction	Abhora; Jaharia; Jay Kay	Vander Von Odd	$100,000; A deluxe crown and scepter package from Fierce Drag Jewels; A headlining spot on the 2026 Dragula World Tour; The title of "Queen of the Underworld"
