= The Boulet Brothers' Dragula =

American reality competition TV series

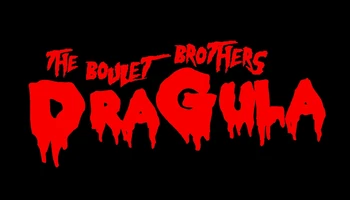
- Genre: Reality competition
- Created by: The Boulet Brothers
- Directed by: KC Lindley; Nathan Noyes; Michael Varrati
- Judges: The Boulet Brothers
- Theme music composer: Swanthula Boulet; Adrian Sosa
- Country of origin: United States
- Original language: English
- No. of seasons: 7
- No. of episodes: 58

Production
- Executive producers: The Boulet Brothers (S2, 3): Brad Danks; Philip Webb; Anthony Jiwa
- Editors: Nathan Noyes (S1, 2, 3, Resurrection); KC Lindley (S1, 2, 3, Resurrection); Aaron McMillan (S2); Kevin Alexis Fernandez (S2); Michale Frost (S3); Charles Wright (S3); Jim Bromley (S3)
- Camera setup: Multiple
- Running time: 36–65 minutes
- Production companies: Boulet Brothers Productions; Ash+Bone Cinema (S1)

Original release
- Network: Hey Qween Network (U.S.; S1); Amazon Prime (U.S.; S2–3/U.K.); Netflix (U.S.; S3); Shudder (U.S.; S4–present); OutTV (Canada); SBS Viceland (Australia)
- Release: October 31, 2016 – present

Related
- The Boulet Brothers' Dragula: Titans

The Boulet Brothers' Dragula is an American reality competition television series produced by Boulet Brothers Productions, hosted by the Boulet Brothers. The series originally aired on YouTube and has aired on Netflix in the United States, OUTtv in Canada, and Amazon Prime in the United Kingdom and Australia. Starting with season 4, the series moved to Shudder in all territories. The series is a Shudder exclusive, with all seasons being hosted on the platform.

The series is created and hosted by the Boulet Brothers, who challenge a different set of eleven drag artists from around the world to compete in an underground-style drag competition each season. The artists compete for the chance to win a cash prize and the crown of "Dragula - the World's Next Drag Supermonster". The show celebrates underground and alternative drag art, and bases each episode's challenges on the four principles of the show "Drag", "Filth", "Horror", and "Glamour".

Competitors on the show are tasked week to week in a variety of challenges ranging from costume creation, special-effects makeup, live performance and acting abilities. Each episode a winner is chosen, and the contestants who end up on the bottom must face extreme "extermination challenges" which test them physically and psychologically to prove they have the punk spirit required by the judges to remain in the competition.

== History ==
The Boulet Brothers' Dragula is created and produced by the Boulet Brothers and their production company Boulet Brothers Productions. The reality show is loosely based on their club event and nightlife pageant of the same name.

The first season of The Boulet Brothers' Dragula premiered on October 31, 2016, and aired as a seven episode pilot series on the YouTube channel Hey Qween!. Later that year, the show was picked up by Canadian network OutTV who ordered a full remastered and expanded version of Season 1, as well as a full second season of the show.

Season 2 premiered on October 31, 2017, and aired on Amazon Prime and WOW Presents in the United States. The season aired on Amazon Prime in the United Kingdom, OUTtv in Canada and SBS Viceland in Australia.

The series' third season premiered on Amazon Prime on August 27, 2019. Dragula became the first American reality television competition to feature a drag king after Landon Cider appeared as a contestant in Season 3. Beginning October 31, 2019, seasons 2 and 3 of the series moved to the American streaming service Netflix.

On October 20, 2020, the show aired a special episode titled Dragula: Resurrection, which brought back seven past contestants to compete for a spot on the fourth season of Dragula. The winner of Resurrection was Saint, who first competed on Season 3. Both the special and the subsequent season streamed on Shudder.

On December 7, 2021, Shudder renewed the series for a fifth season. On September 12, 2022, it was announced that an "all-stars" season titled Dragula: Titans would premiere on Shudder on October 25, 2022. The cast was announced on September 26, 2022, and featured 10 contestants returning from the first four seasons of Dragula. Victoria Black, who previously competed on Season 2 and Resurrection, emerged victorious and was crowned Dragula's first Titan.

On April 25, 2023, The Boulet Brothers' Halfway to Halloween TV special, a related one-off special was released on Shudder, featuring former contestants and celebrity guest stars, including Matthew Lillard and Twin Temple. On December 5, 2023, Shudder renewed the series for a sixth season. The sixth season premiered on October 1, 2024, on Shudder and AMC+.

On April 23, 2025, the series was renewed for a seventh season. The seventh season premiered on October 27, 2026.

== Format ==
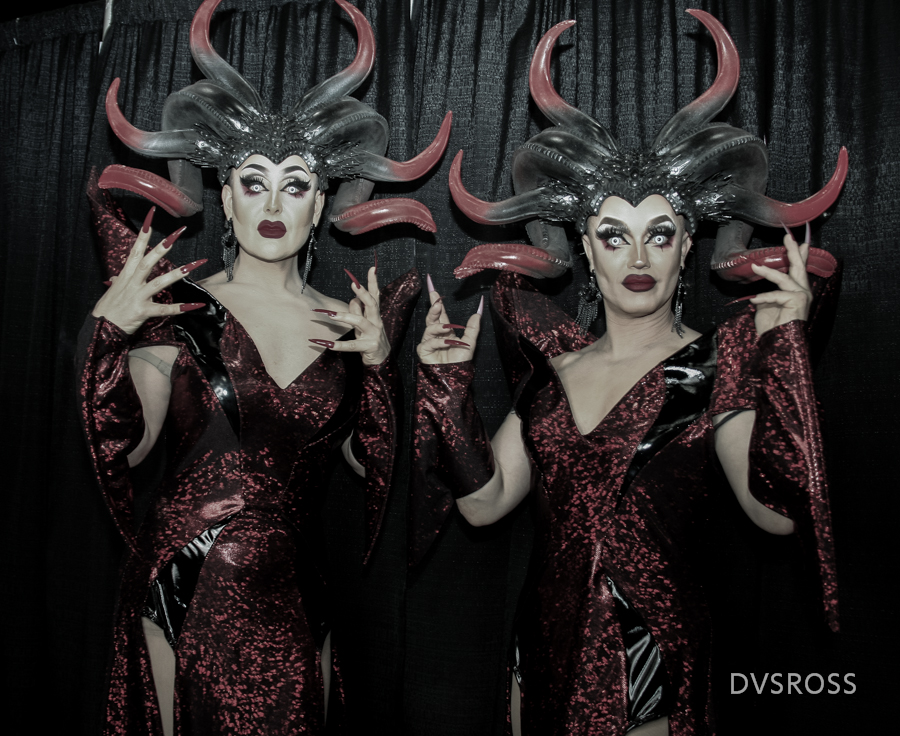
The Boulet Brothers at Los Angeles DragCon 2018

Each episode opens with a scripted scene starring the Boulet Brothers that introduces the episode's theme and challenge. The rest of the episode is filmed in a reality TV documentary format. The competitors are issued that week's challenge, and must work among each other, work out their interpersonal issues and create their looks and performances for that week. Both the competition and the show's scripted cinematic segments are noted for drawing inspiration from the horror genre. The show's influences include films ranging from "Mad Max and Little Shop of Horrors, to folk horror and beach party films."

Each episode features a main "Floor Show" where each of the competitors display their looks and performance on the main stage. The performances and looks are judged, and one competitor is chosen the winner while the two or more lowest scoring competitors are put up for "extermination".

The show features "Extermination Challenges", fear-based physical and psychological tests created to push the competitors to "face their fears" in order to remain on the show. Past challenges have included being buried alive in a coffin, being pierced with gauged needles, skydiving, eating cow intestines, and surviving an evening in an extreme haunted house. The competitor who fails the extermination challenge is "killed off" by the Boulet Brothers in a scripted scene at the end of each episode.

== Judges ==
The Boulet Brothers serve as the primary judges on the show, and are the only regular judges on the panel. Each episode they are joined by a rotating cast of celebrity musicians, directors, writers and horror alumni including Henry Rollins, Milly Shapiro, Amanda Lepore, Bonnie Aarons, Felissa Rose, Danielle Harris, Rachel True, and Cig Nuetron. American horror film director Darren Stein is the only judge to have appeared in all six seasons of the show.

Main judges on The Boulet Brothers' Dragula
Judge	Season									
Judge	1	2	3	R	4	T	5	6	T2	7
Judge	2016-17	2017-18	2019	2020	2021	2022	2023-24	2024	2025	2026
Dracmorda Boulet	Main	Main	Main	Main	Main	Main	Main	Main	Main	Main
Swanthula Boulet	Main	Main	Main	Main	Main	Main	Main	Main	Main	Main

== Series overview ==
Season	Contestants	Episodes	Originally released			Winner	Runners-up	Prizes
Season	Contestants	Episodes	First released	Last released	Network	Winner	Runners-up	Prizes
1	9	7	31 October 2016	20 February 2017	Hey Qween Network	Vander Von Odd	Frankie Doom; Melissa Befierce	$10,000; The title of "The World's First Drag Supermonster"
2	10	10	31 October 2017	16 January 2018	Amazon Prime	Biqtch Puddin'	James Majesty; Victoria Elizabeth Black	$10,000; The title of "The World's Next Drag Supermonster"
3	11	10	27 August 2019	28 October 2019	Amazon Prime; Netflix	Landon Cider	Dollya Black; Priscilla Chambers	$25,000; The title of "The World's Next Drag Supermonster"
4	11	10	19 October 2021	21 December 2021	Shudder	Dahli	HoSo Terra Toma; Saint; Sigourney Beaver	$100,000; A headlining spot on the upcoming Dragula World Tour; A deluxe crown and scepter package from Fierce Drag Jewels; The title of "The World's Next Drag Supermonster"
5	11	10	31 October 2023	16 January 2024	Shudder; AMC+	Niohuru X	Blackberri; Orkgotik; Throb Zombie	$100,000; A headlining spot on the upcoming Dragula World Tour; A deluxe crown and scepter package from Fierce Drag Jewels; The title of "The World's Next Drag Supermonster"
6	12	10	1 October 2024	2 December 2024	Shudder; AMC+	Asia Consent	Auntie Heroine; Grey Matter	$100,000; A merchandising development deal with PEG Management; A lifetime supply of special effects gore and glam makeup from Ben Nye; The title of "The World's Next Drag Supermonster"
7	12	TBA	27 October 2026	TBA	Shudder; AMC+	TBA	TBA	$100,000; The title of "The World's Next Drag Supermonster"

== Spin-off series overview ==
=== The Boulet Brothers' Dragula: Resurrection ===
A spin-off film titled The Boulet Brothers' Dragula: Resurrection was released on AMC Networks' Shudder on October 20, 2020. The film was written, co-directed, and produced by the Boulet Brothers. Digital Spy described it as "part-horror movie, part-documentary and part-reality competition". The film featured a competition between contestants from previous seasons of Dragula, with the winner returning for the fourth season of Dragula. The film's soundtrack includes music from Orville Peck and Kim Petras.

Saint, formerly known as St. Lucia, was declared the winner of the special, earning a $20,000 cash prize and a spot as a contestant on the fourth season of The Boulet's Brothers' Dragula.

==== Contestants ====
Legend:

Saint won The Boulet Brothers' Dragula: Resurrection.
Dahli was the runner-up, being the last exterminated. They came back to life in a post-credits scene and returned to compete on season 4.
Victoria Black made the Top 3, but chose to quit the competition.
The contestant was exterminated.

Contestants of The Boulet Brothers' Dragula: Resurrection and their placements
Contestant	Hometown	Original season	Original placement	Outcome
Saint (Note: Saint was referred as St. Lucia on her original season.)	Acworth, Georgia	Season 3	10th place	Winner
Dahli (Note: The Dahli is referred to as Dahli on the special.)	Phoenix, Arizona	Season 2	7th place	Runner-up
Victoria Black (Note: Victoria Elizabeth Black is referred to as Victoria Black on the special.)	Orlando, Florida	Season 2	Runner-up	Quit
Frankie Doom	West Covina, California	Season 1	Runner-up	Exterminated
Kendra Onixxx	Riverside, California	Season 2	8th place	Exterminated
Loris	Los Angeles, California (Note: Originally from Zürich, Switzerland)	Season 1	5th place	Exterminated
Priscilla Chambers	Asheville, North Carolina	Season 3	Runner-up	Exterminated

=== The Boulet Brothers' Dragula: Titans ===
An All Stars spin-off series titled The Boulet Brothers' Dragula: Titans was announced on September 12, 2022, and the first season was released on AMC Networks' Shudder on October 25, 2022. The show documents past queens from the original series returning to compete at the invitation of the Boulet Brothers.

As in the original series, the Boulet Brothers plays the role of hosts, mentors, and head judges and contestants are given different challenges each week. The Boulet Brothers' Dragula: Titans employs a panel of several guest judges who, along with the hosts, critique contestants' progress throughout the competition. The winner of each season is awarded a cash prize and the title of Queen of the Underworld, formerly known as The World's Next Drag Supermonster. A second season premiered on October 7, 2025.

== Reception ==
Since its original online airing, Dragula has received positive reviews, and was dubbed "Required Horror Viewing" by Fangoria. The series has had consistently high viewership, and its fourth season was the most watched program on Shudder.

The show treats drag as a form of outsider art, and encourages different styles of drag which could be labelled "weird" or unconventional. Carly Maga of horror magazine Rue Morgue identified the rising popularity of Dragula as having a positive impact on drag as a whole, saying that the "rise of horror drag is keeping the art form true to its nonconformist origins".

Vice writer Jeff Leavell reviewed the series as being "loud, weird" and that it "pisses on heteronormativity". He also said that Dragula should not be thought of as "just a show about drag queens who love grotesque, hardcore queer performance art", and that "in its own way, it's encouraging us to stand united, whether you're a supermonster or not".

Adam Zee of Wussy Magazine praised the series for its philosophy towards drag, exemplified by the Boulet Brothers' statement that "We are not here to judge your drag. Drag is art and art is subjective." Zee commented that:

"While it seems simple, this simple idea is what truly distinguishes The Boulet Brothers' Dragula from RuPaul's Drag Race and most other reality competitions. The Boulets place significant value in the artistic merit and anti-establishment traditions of drag. They have directed their focus on drag artistry that is unpredictable, outlandish and disturbing rather than getting queens to conform to show business standards. The only molds contestants must fit into are challenge-based or the loose overarching tenets of Filth, Glamour and Horror. Even then, 2 out of 3 is usually good enough to get by."

Dragula has also received favorable coverage for its inclusion of all genders and types of drag performers in the competition. It was the first televised U.S. show to feature a drag king and an AFAB drag artist. The film Dragula Resurrection was praised for foregrounding trans narratives in a "sensitive, understated" manner.

=== Awards and nominations ===
Year	Award	Category	Nominee(s)	Result	Ref.
2024	Primetime Creative Arts Emmy Awards	Outstanding Hairstyling for a Variety, Nonfiction or Reality Program	Marco Gabellini (for "Trash Can Children")	Nominated	
2024	Primetime Creative Arts Emmy Awards	Outstanding Makeup for a Variety, Nonfiction or Reality Program	The Boulet Brothers (for "Terror in the Woods")	Nominated	
2024	35th GLAAD Media Awards	Outstanding Reality Competition Program	The Boulet Brothers’ Dragula (Shudder/AMC+)	Nominated	
2025	Costume Designers Guild Awards	Excellence in Variety, Reality-Competition, and Live Television	Gioffrè Vincenzo (for "Killer Dolls")	Pending	
2025	36th GLAAD Media Awards	Outstanding Reality Competition Program	The Boulet Brothers’ Dragula (Shudder/AMC+)	Pending	

== See also ==
- List of programs broadcast by OUTtv
- List of Shudder original programming
- List of reality television programs with LGBT cast members
