= List of drag queens =

This is a list of drag queens, drag performers, or drag artists.

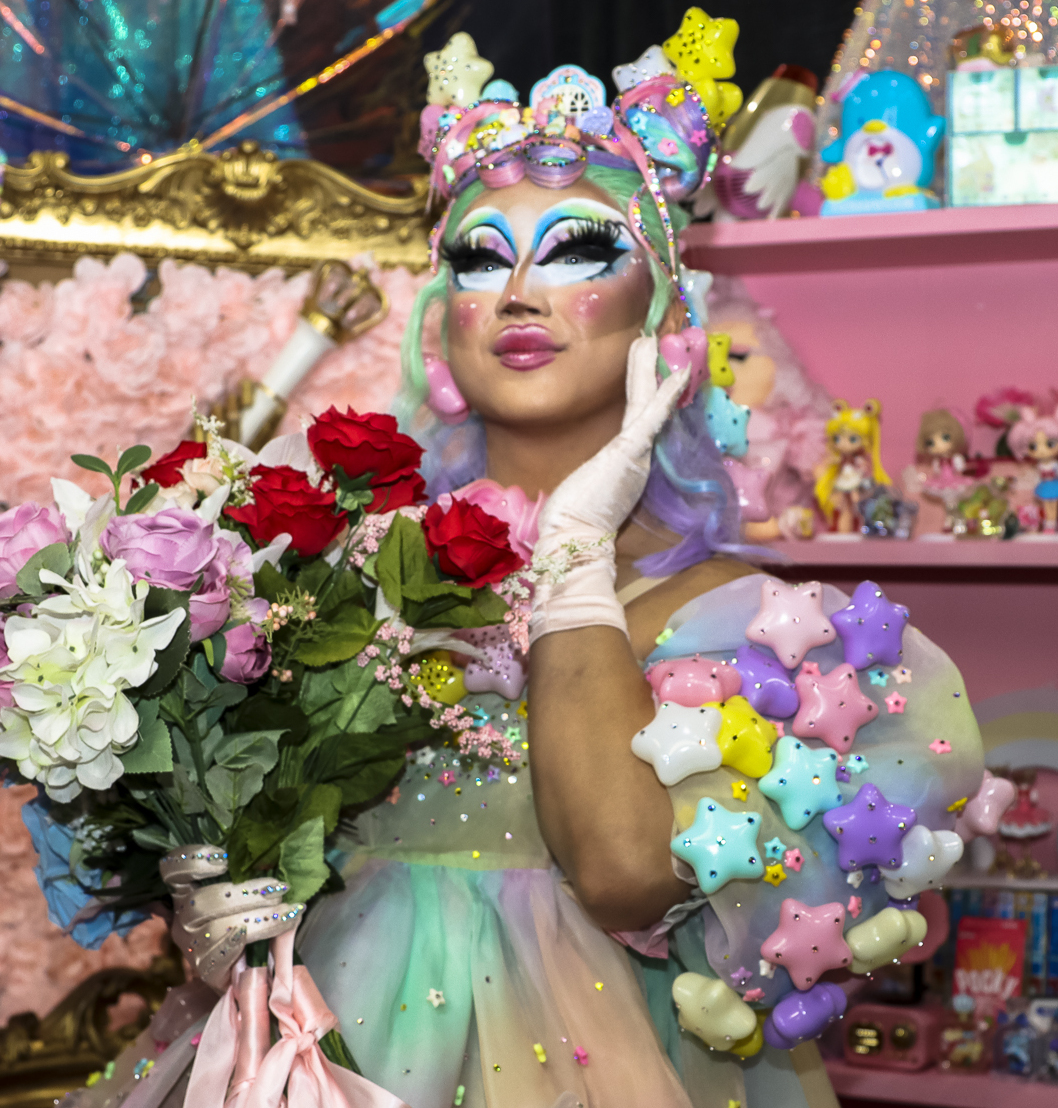
Rock M. Sakura

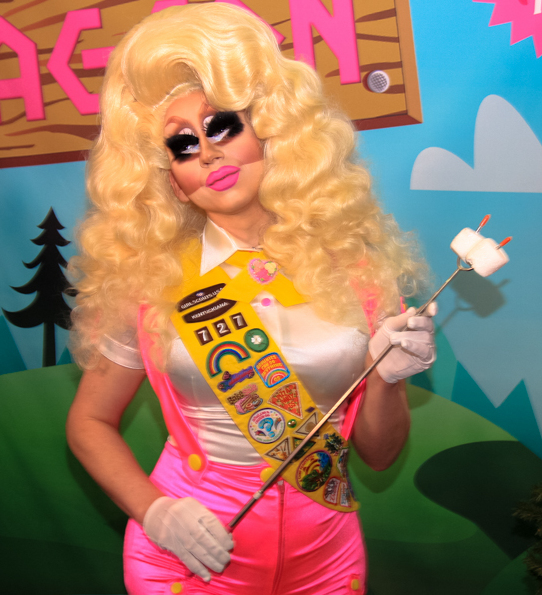
Trixie Mattel

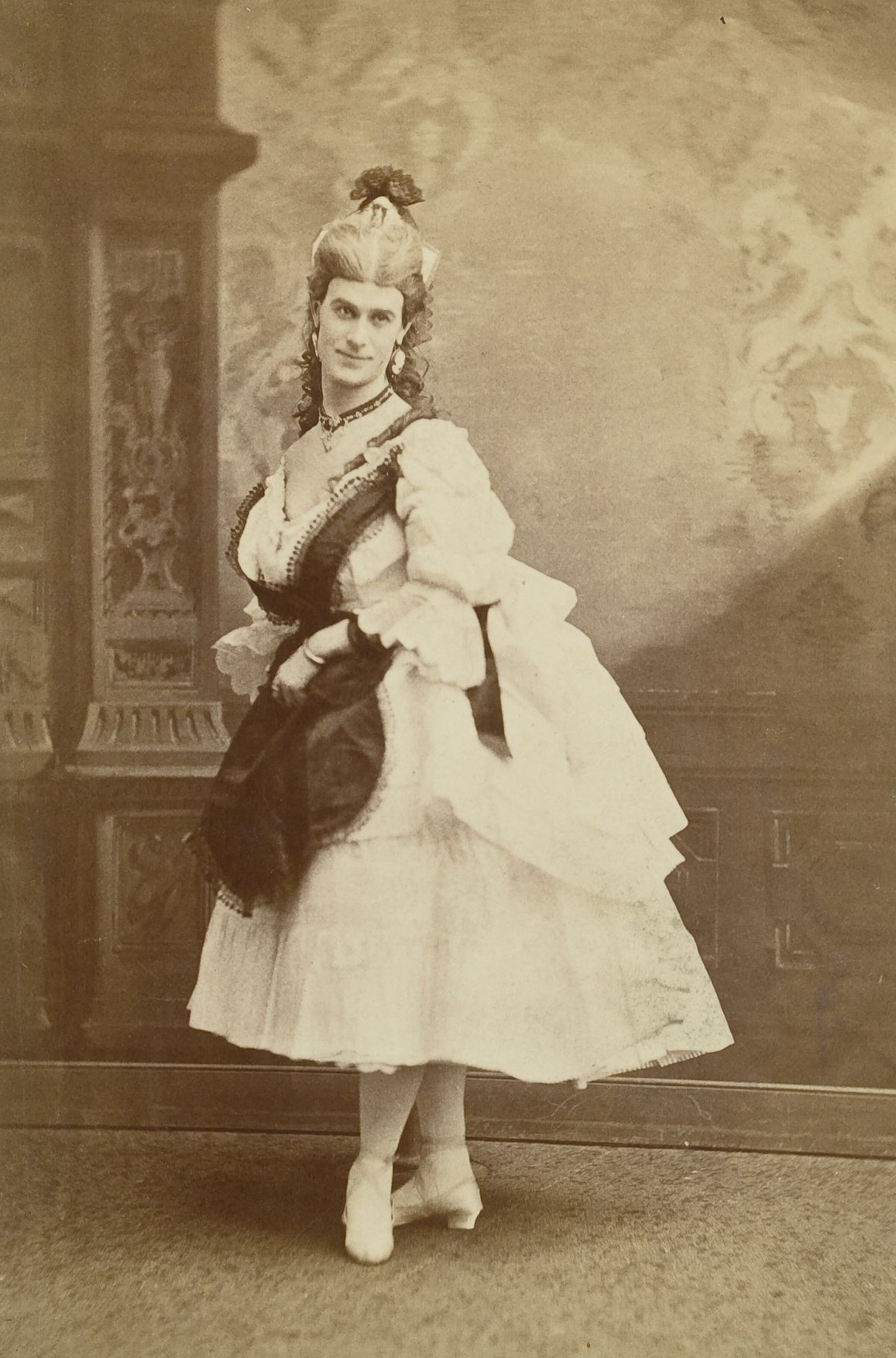
Francis Leon

Miss Shangay Lily

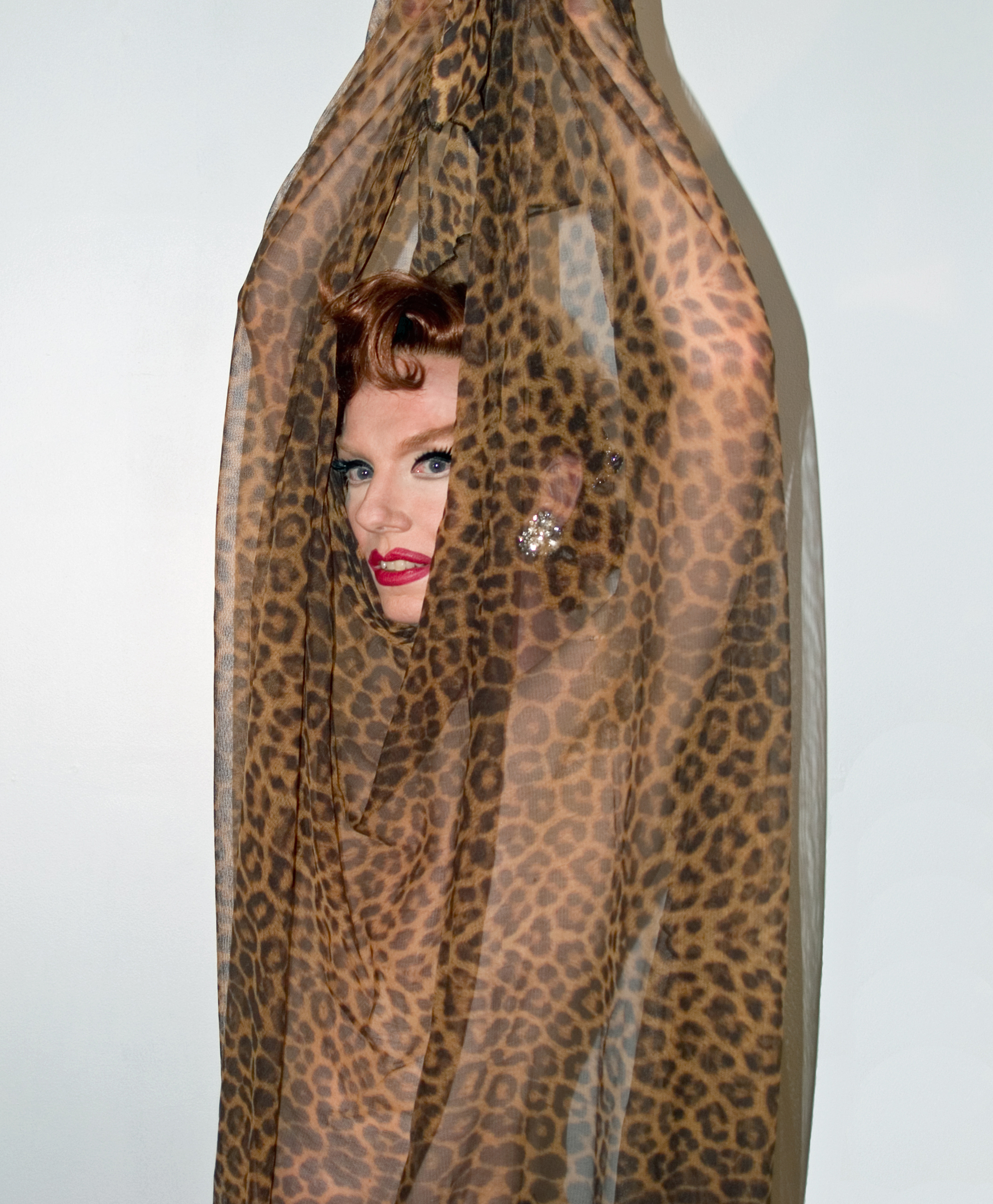
John Epperson

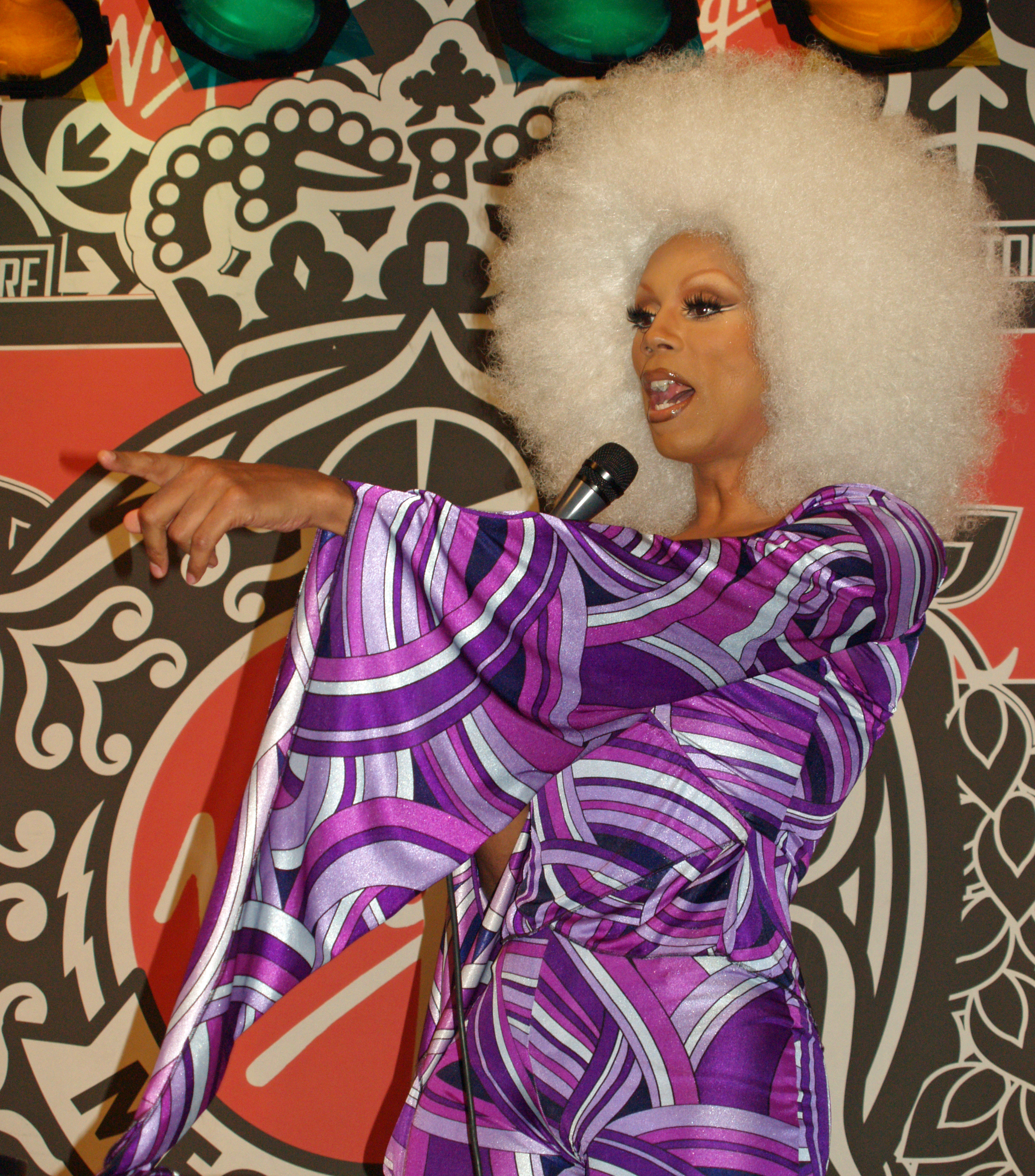
RuPaul

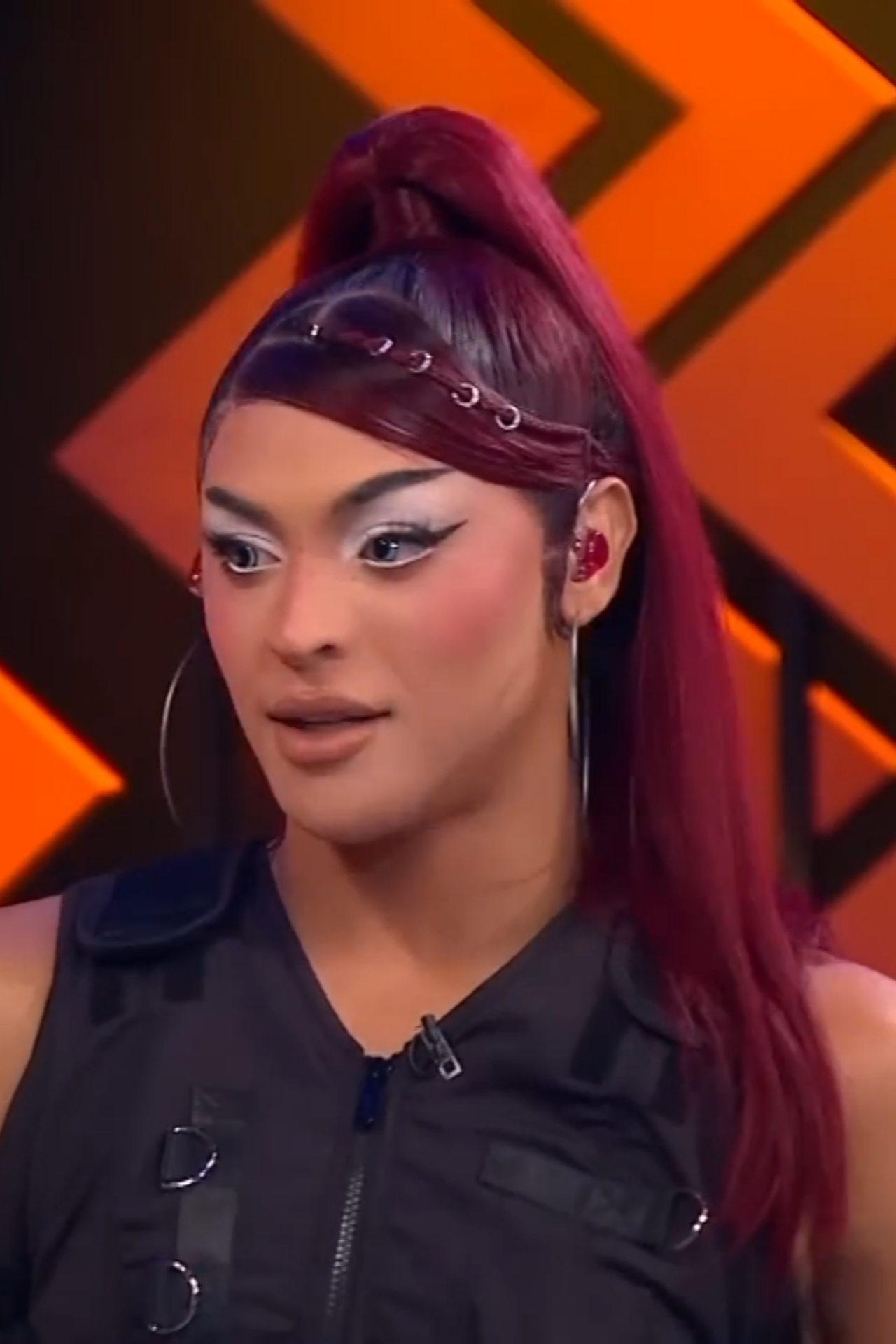
Pabllo Vittar

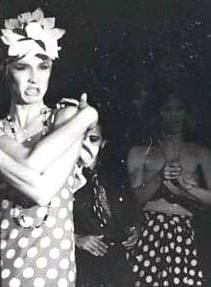
Zsa Zsa Shakespeer (1976)

== Performers ==
Stage name	Name	Nationality	Ref(s)
A'keria Chanel Davenport	Gregory D'Wayne	United States	
A'Whora	George Boyle	United Kingdom / England	
Acacia Forgot	Tyler Heavner	United States	
Acid Betty	Jamin Ruhren	United States	
Actavia	Charlie Lindsay	Wales	
Ada Shufflebotham	Roy Barraclough	United Kingdom	
Ada Vox	Adam Sanders	United States	
Admira Thunderpussy	Adam Risberg	Sweden	
Adore Delano	Dani Noriega	United States	
Adriana	Daniel Albornoz	Canada / Colombia	
Aiden Zhane	Devin Lewis	United States	
Aimee Yonce Shennel	Wilnest Domínguez	Canada / Dominican Republic	
Aja	Venus Nadya Oshun	United States	
Akihiro Miwa	Maruyama Akihiro	Japan	
Alaska Thunderfuck	Justin Honard	United States	
Alden Garrison	Alden Garrison	United States	
Alehandra del Barrio		Romania	
Alexis Campbell Starr		United States	
Alexis Mateo	Alexis Mateo Pacheco	United States / Puerto Rico	
Alexis Michelle	Alexander Michaels	United States	
Alvilda	Alexandre	Belgium	
Alyssa Edwards	Justin Johnson	United States	
Alyssa Hunter	Joshua Enrique Ortolaza Resto	Puerto Rico	
Amanda Tori Meating	Amanda Philipps	United States	
Amber LeMay	Bob Bolyard	United States	
Amber Richards	Amber Marie Williams	United States	
Amethyst	Amy Taylor	United States	
Amyl		Australia / Colombia	
Anastarzia Anaquway	Jermaine Aranha	Canada / Bahamas, The	
Anetra	Isaiah Padua	United States	
Angel Galang	Angel Galang	Philippines	
Angele Anang	Angele-Anang Pokinwuttipob	Thailand	
Angeria Paris VanMicheals	Tommie Laron Holsey	United States	
Angie Stardust	Mel Michaels	United States	
Anita Wigl'it	Nick Hall	New Zealand	
Année Maywong	Thanisorn Hengsoontorn	Thailand	
Anoush Ellah	Aren Adamian	Canada	
Anubis Finch	Charli Finch	United Kingdom / England	
April Carrión	Jason Carrión	United States / Puerto Rico	
Aquadisiac	Josh Kilmer-Purcell	United States	
Aquaria	Giovanni Palandrani	United States	
Arantxa Castilla-La Mancha	Arantxa Méndez García	Spain	
Arianda Sodi	Ariel Cerda	Chile	
Ariel Rec	Ruben Carrascosa Errebeene	Spain	
Ariel Versace	Bryan Neel	United States	
Arizona Brandy	Genesis Brillantes Vijandre	Philippines	
Arrietty	Luis Luviano	United States	
Art Arya	Araya Indra	Thailand	
Arthur Blake	Arthur Blake	United States	
Art Simone	Jack Daye	Australia	
Ashley Madison	Sean Glasson	Australia	
Asia Consent		United States	
Asia O'Hara	Antwan Lee	United States	
Asifa Lahore	Asif Quraishi	United Kingdom	
Asttina Mandella	Aston Joshua	United Kingdom / England	
Athena Sorgelikis	Arnaud Tsiakas	Belgium / Greece	
Aubrey Haive	Bailey Dunnage	Australia	
Auntie Heroine	Stephen Ramberg	United States	
Aura Eternal	Alan Yuri Geraci	Italy	
Aura Mayari	Jay-R de Leon	United States / Philippines	
Aurora Gozmic	Austin Lemoine	United States	
Aurora Matrix	Anton Ling	Canada	
Ava Hangar	Riccardo Massidda	Italy	
Ava Pocket	Luis Ríos Melo	Mexico	
Babsan	Lars-Åke Wilhelmsson	Sweden	
Baby	Romone Clark	England	
Baga Chipz	Leo Loren	United Kingdom / England	
Bailey J Mills	Bailey-Jaye Mills	United Kingdom	
Bandit	Bandit Janthawan	Thailand	
Banksie	Jonathan Banks	United Kingdom	
Barbada de Barbades	Sébastien Potvin	Canada	
Barbara Quigley	Mark Peacock	Canada	
Barbette	Vander Clyde Broadway	United States	
Barbie Breakout	Timo Pfaff	Germany	
Bassem Feghali	Bassem Feghali	Lebanon	
Bebe Sweetbriar	Kevin-Lee Junious	United States	
BeBe Zahara Benet	Nea Marshall Kudi	Cameroon / United States	
Begum Nawazish Ali	Ali Saleem	Pakistan	
Bella Blue		Romania	
BenDeLaCreme	Benjamin Putnam	United States	
Bernie	Bernie Barrantes	Philippines	
Berta Beeson	Herbert Beeson	United States	
Bert Errol	Isaac Whitehouse	United Kingdom	
Bert Savoy	Everett McKenzie	United States	
Bestiah	Marcos Galisteo Pedraz	Spain	
Beth	Rolland Bissonette	Canada	
Betta Naan Stop	Prateek Sachdeva	India	
Bette Bourne	Peter Bourne	United Kingdom	
Betty BBQ		Germany	
Beverly Kills		Australia	
Bianca Del Rio	Roy Haylock	United States	
Billy More	Massimo Brancaccio	Italy	
Bimini Bon-Boulash	Tommy Hibbitts	United Kingdom / England	
Biqtch Puddin'	Steven Glen Diehl	United States	
Bitter Betty	Sara Andrews	United States	
Black Peppa	Akeem-Anthony Adams	United Kingdom / Sint Maarten	
Blair St. Clair		United States	
Blu Hydrangea	Joshua Cargill	United Kingdom	
BOA	Ryan Boa	Canada	
Bobbie Kimber	Ronald Victor Kimberley	United Kingdom	
Bobby Marchan	Oscar James Gibson	United States	
Bob the Drag Queen	Christopher Caldwell	United States	
Bolivia Carmichaels	Daniel Elliott	United States	
Bombae	Mudit Ganguly	Canada / India	
Bones	Paul Greaves	United Kingdom	
Bonnie Ann Clyde	James Keogh	Ireland	
Bosco	Blair Constantino	United States	
Bothwell Browne	Walter Bothwell Bruhn	Denmark / United States	
Botota Fox / Stephanie Fox	José Miguel Navarrete Navarrete	Chile	
Boulet Brothers	Unknown	United States	
Brenda Bressed	Bryce Gibson	Australia	
Brigiding	John Philip Aricheta	Philippines	
Brigitte Bandit	Cheri Lake	United States	
Brini Maxwell	Ben Sander	United States	
Brita Filter	Jesse Havea	United States	
Britney Houston	Jahmila Adderley	United States	
Brooke Lynn Hytes	Brock Hayhoe	Canada	
Buckwheat	Edward Cowley	New Zealand	
Bumpa Love	Richard Taki	Australia	
Bunny Breckinridge	John Cabell Breckinridge	United States	
Burrita Burrona	Iván Guzmán	Mexico	
Captivating Katkat	Katkat Dasalla	Philippines	
Capucine	Kewpie	South Africa	
Cara Melle	Sterling Butler	United States	
Carmen Carrera	Carmen Carrera	United States	
Carmen Farala	Daniel Mora Rojas	Spain	
Carmen Rupe	Carmen Rupe	New Zealand	
Catrin Feelings	Ellis Lloyd Jones	Wales	
Celeda		United States	
Chad Michaels	Chad Michael Storbeck	United States	
Chanel Anorex	Cristofer Caamaño González	Spain	
Chanel O'Conor	Conor MacDonald	Scotland	
Chappell Roan	Kayleigh Rose Amstutz	United States	
Charity Kase	Harry Whitfield	United Kingdom	
Charlene	Charlene Incarnate	United States	
Charles Busch	Charles Busch	United States	
Charles Ludlam	Charles Ludlam	United States	
Charles Pierce	Charles Pierce	United States	
Charlie Hides	Charlie Hides	United States / United Kingdom	
Charra Tea	James Martin	United Kingdom	
Cheddar Gorgeous	Michael Atkins	United Kingdom	
Chelazon Leroux	Layten Byhette	Canada	
Cherdonna Shinatra	Jody Kuehner	United States	
Cherry Valentine	George Ward	United Kingdom / England	
Cheryl Hole	Luke Underwood-Bleach	United Kingdom / England	
Cheyenne Pepper	Eugene Lee Yang	South Korea / United States	
Chi Chi DeVayne	Zavion Davenport	United States	
Chi Chi LaRue	Larry David Paciotti	United States	
Chiquitita	Angel Flores	United States	
La Chola Chabuca	Ernesto Pimentel Yesquén	Peru	
Choriza May	Adrian Martín Esteve	England / Spain	
Chris Sheen	Christopher Shinfield	United Kingdom	
Christeene Vale	Paul Soileau	United States	
Chucky Bartolo	Andrew Bartolo	Malta / Scotland	
Cissie Braithwaite	Les Dawson	United Kingdom	
Coco Jem Holiday		United States	
Coco Jumbo	Luke Vito	Australia	
Coco Montrese	Lenwood Martin Cooper	United States	
Conchita Castillio	Robert Windisman	Canada	
Conchita Wurst	Thomas Neuwirth	Austria	
Cookie Buffet	Christopher Dyer	United States	
Cookie Kunty	Romain Eck	France / Canada	
Copper Topp	Simon Wegrzyn	United Kingdom	
Corazon	Lenard Medrano	Philippines	
Courtney Act	Shane Jenek	Australia	
Craig Russell	Russell Craig Eadie	Canada	
Creme Fatale		United States	
Cristal Snow	Tapio Huuska	Finland	
Cristian Peralta	Cristian Peralta	Mexico	
Crystal	Colin Munro Seymour	Canada / United Kingdom	
Crystal Demure	J. Harrison Ghee	United States	
Crystal Envy	Christopher Cianci	United States	
Crystal LaBeija		United States	
Crystal Methyd	Cody Harness	United States	
Cynthia Doll		United States	
Cynthia Lee Fontaine	Carlos Díaz Hernández	United States / Puerto Rico	
Dahli	Jeremy Griffis	United States	
Dahlia Sin	Erick Green	United States	
Dakota Schiffer	Astrid Basson	England	
Dallas DuBois	Daniel Logan	United States	
Dame Edna Everage	Barry Humphries	Australia	
Danna Galán	David Aruquipa	Bolivia	
Danny Beard	Daniel Curtis	United Kingdom	
Danny La Rue	Daniel Patrick Carroll	Ireland	
Daphne	Srečko	Slovenia	
Darcelle XV	Walter Willard Cole	United States	
D'Arcy Drollinger		United States	
Darienne Lake	Greg Meyer	United States	
Dawn	Gaven Kerr	United States	
Daya Betty	Trenton Clarke	United States	
Deborah Ombres	Javier Díaz	Spain	
DeDeLicious	Charlie Veysey-Smith	United Kingdom	
DeeDee Marié Holliday		Philippines	
DeJa Skye	Willie Redman	United States	
Delta Work	Gabriel Villarreal	United States	
Denali Foxx	Cordero Zuckerman	United States	
Denim	Emerson Sanderson	Canada	
Derrick Barry	Derrick Barry	United States	
Desmond is Amazing	Desmond Napoles	United States	
Detox	Deandra Sanderson	United States	
Diamante Merybrown	Jhemmler Castillo Germán	Spain / Dominican Republic	
DiDa Ritz	Xavier Hairston	United States	
Didik Nini Thowok	Didik Hadiprayitno	Indonesia	
Dina Martina	Grady West	United States	
Divina de Campo	Owen Farrow	United Kingdom / England	
Divina Duvall		Romania	
Divine	Harris Glenn Milstead	United States	
The Divine David	David Hoyle	United Kingdom	
Dixie Longate	Kris Andersson	United States	
Dominot	Antonio Iacono	Italy	
Donna Sachet	Kirk Reeves	United States	
Dorian Corey	Frederick Legg	United States	
Doris Fish	Phillip Clargo Mills	Australia / United States	
Dovima Nurmi	Rafael De Lorente	Spain	
DQ	Peter Andersen	Denmark	
Drag Chuchi	Pedro Alberto Bethencourt Guerra	Spain	
Drag Couenne	Adrien de Biasi	Belgium	
Drag Noa	Norma Ruiz	Spain	
Drag Sethlas	Borja Casillas Toledo	Spain	
Drag Vulcano	Isidro Javier Pérez Mateo	Spain	
Dreuxilla Divine	Nelson Roldán	Puerto Rico	
Drusilla Foer	Gianluca Gori	Italy	
Durian Lollobrigida	Masaki Ōtake	Japan	
Elecktra	Robin Werner	Sweden	
Elecktra Bionic	Mattia di Renzo	Italy	
Elektra Fence	Julian Riley	England	
Elektra Shock	James Luck	New Zealand	
Elektra Vandergeld	Eseen Ortiz	Mexico	
Ella Fitzgerald	Donnell Robinson	United States	
Ella Vaday	Nick Collier	England	
Ella Zoyara / Miss Ella	Omar Kingsley	United States	
Ellie Diamond	Elliot Haefner Glen	United Kingdom / Scotland	
Elliott with 2 Ts	Elliott Puckett	United States	
Elvira	Cassandra Peterson	United States	
Emperatrizz	Damjan	Slovenia	
Endigo	Tobias Endigo Öberg	Sweden / Japan	
Enorma Jean	Davide Gatto	Italy	
Envy Peru	Boris Itzkovich Escobar	Peru / Netherlands	
Erica Andrews	Erica Andrews	Mexico	
Erickatoure Aviance		United States	
Erika Klash	Miki Torres	United States	
Estrella Xtravaganza	Fernando Carretero Vega	Spain	
Etcetera Etcetera	Oliver Levi-Malouf	Australia	
Ethyl Eichelberger	James Roy Eichelberger	United States	
Eureka O'Hara	Eureka D. Huggard	United States	
Eva Blunt	Pablo Levy	Mexico	
Eva Le Queen	Jan Lamban	Philippines	
Eve 6000	Rina Adams	Canada	
Evie Harris	Jack Plotnick	United States	
Evita Bezuidenhout	Pieter-Dirk Uys	South Africa	
The Fabulous Wonder Twins	Carlos Eduardo Campos; Louis Alberto Campos	El Salvador / United States	
Fantasia Royale Gaga	Latavia Goldson	United States	
Farida Kant	Riccardo Occhilupo	Italy	
Farrah Moan	Cameron Clayton	United States	
Faúx Fúr		Australia	
Fauxnique	Monique Jenkinson	United States	
Fay Slift	Jean Paul Kane	Canada	
Felicia Flames	Felicia Elizondo	United States	
Fernanda		Romania	
Fifi la True	Jamie Campbell	United Kingdom	
Flawless Sabrina	Jack Doroshow	United States	
Flawless Shade	Tajh Jordan	United States	
Flettfrid Andresen	Jakob Margido Esp	Norway	
Flor	Pedro Duque	Guatemala / New Zealand	
Fluffy Soufflé	Kaleb Robertson	Canada	
Fontana	Gabriel Fontana Teixeira	Brazil / Sweden	
Foo Foo Lammar	Francis Joseph Pearson	United Kingdom	
Formelda Hyde	Brian Garcia	United States	
Francheska Dynamites	Francis Yutrago	Canada / Philippines	
Francis Leon	Francis Patrick Glassey	United States	
Frankie Wonga	Wongboworn Pansuwan	Thailand	
Frank Marino	Frank Marino	United States	
Frankie Jaxon	Frank Devera Jackson	United States	
Frau Wäber	Hansy Vogt	Germany	
Frederick Kovert	Frederick Kovert	United States	
Fred van Leer	Fred van Leer	Netherlands	
Freya Armani		Australia / United States	
Gabriella Labucci		Australia	
Gala Varo	Jesús Meza Arroyo	Mexico	
Gena Marvin		Russia	
Geneva Karr		United States / Mexico	
Genie	Amit Gurnani	United States	
Gia Gunn	Gia Keitaro Ichikawa	United States / Japan	
Gia Metric	Giorgio Triberio	Canada	
Gigi Era		Philippines / Australia	
Gigi Goode	Gigi Goode	United States	
Gilbert Sarony	Gilbert Sarony	United States	
Ginger Johnson	Donald Marshall	United Kingdom / England	
Ginger Minj	Joshua Allan Eads	United States	
Gingzilla	Ben Hudson	Australia	
Ginny Lemon	Lewis Mandall	United Kingdom / England	
The Girlfriend Experience	Daniela Le Bon	Canada / Germany	
Gisèle Lullaby	Simon Gosselin	Canada	
Glennda Orgasm	Glenn Belverio	United States	
Gloria Groove	Daniel Garcia Felicione Napoleão	Brazil	
Goddess Bunny	Sandra Crisp	United States	
Gothy Kendoll	Samuel David Handley	England	
Gottmik	Kade Gottlieb	United States	
Grag Queen	Grégory Crescencio da Silva Mohd	Brazil	
Guilda	Jean Guida	France / Canada	
Halal Bae	Sherif Talaab	Canada / Kuwait	
Hana Beshie	AJ Asi	Philippines	
Hannah Conda	Chris Collins	Australia	
Harpy Daniels	Joshua Kelley	United States	
Harvey Fierstein	Harvey Fierstein	United States	
Hedda Lettuce	Steven Polito	United States	
Heidi N Closet	Trevien Cheek	United States	
Heklina	Stefan Grygelko	United States	
Helena Poison	Matt Fancy	Canada	
Herbert Clifton	Herbert Clifton	United States	
Hinge and Bracket	George Logan and Patrick Fyffe	United Kingdom	
Hollow Eve	Caitlin Crandall	United States	
Hollywould Star	Timothy Springs	United States / Australia	
Honey Davenport	James Heath-Clark	United States	
Honey Mahogany	Honey Mahogany	United States	
Hormona Lisa	Lisa Corbin	United States	
Hornella Góngora	Javier Sevillano Jiménez	Spain	
HoSo Terra Toma		Republic of Korea / United States	
Hot Chocolate	Larry Edwards	United States	
Hugáceo Crujiente	Hugo Díaz	Spain	
Huysuz Virjin	Seyfi Dursunoğlu	Turkey	
ICEIS Rain	Massey Whiteknife	Canada	
Icesis Couture	Steven Granados-Portelance	Canada	
Ilona Verley	Ilona Verley	Canada	
Imaa Queen	Adam Spjuth	Sweden	
India Ferrah	Shane Richardson	United States	
International Chrysis		United States	
Inti	José Otero Aguilera	Spain / Bolivia	
Irene Dubois	Ian Hill	United States	
Irma Gerd	Jason Wells	Canada	
Isis Avis Loren	Michael	Australia	
Issan Dorsey / Tommy Dee	Issan Dorsey	United States	
Ivana	Shawn Hitchins	Canada	
Ivanna Drink	Shameel Kennedy	New Zealand	
Ivory Glaze		Australia	
Ivy Winters	Dustin Winters	United States	
Jackie Beat	Kent Fuher	United States	
Jackie Cox	Darius Rose	United States	
Jackie Curtis	John Holder Jr.	United States	
Jada Shada Hudson	Dwight Giraud	Canada / Barbados	
Jade Elektra	Alphonso King Jr.	United States / Canada	
Jade Jolie	Jules Green	United States	
Jaida Essence Hall	Jared Johnson	United States	
Jaidynn Diore Fierce	Christopher Williams	United States	
James Majesty	James Barker	United States	
James St. James	James Clark	United States	
Jan Sport	Charlie Mantione	United States	
Jane	Sky Gilbert	Canada	
Janey Jacké	Justin Mooijer	Netherlands	
Jasmine Kennedie	Kyle Koritkowski	United States	
Jasmine Masters	Martell Robinson	United States	
Jax	Jackson McGoldrick	United States	
Jaylene Tyme	Jaylene McRae	Canada	
Jaymes Mansfield	James Wirth	United States	
Jazell Barbie Royale		United States	
Jazzmun	Jazzmun Nichala Crayton	United States	
Jean Malin / Imogene Wilson	Gene Malin	United States	
Jenevagina	Laura Corbacho	Spain	
Jerome Caja	Jerome Caja	United States	
Jessica Wild	José David Sierra	United States / Puerto Rico	
Jessie Précieuse	Alex Verville	Canada	
Jewels Sparkles	Dario Rodriguez	United States	
Jiggly Caliente	Bianca Castro-Arabejo	United States	
Jim Bailey	Jim Bailey	United States	
Jimbo	James Insell	Canada	
Jinkx Monsoon	Hera Hoffer	United States	
Joan Jett Blakk	Terence Alan Smith	United States	
Joaquín La Habana		United States / Cuba	
Jodie Harsh	Jay Clarke	United Kingdom	
Joe Black	Joseph Black	United Kingdom / England	
Joey Arias	Joey Arias	United States	
Joella	Joey	United States	
Joey Jay	Joseph Jadryev	United States	
John Fedellaga	John Fedellaga	Philippines	
John Herbert	John Herbert	Canada	
John Hunter	John Hunter	New Zealand	
John Lind	John Lindström	Sweden	
Jojo Zaho	John Ridgeway	Australia	
Jonbers Blonde	Andrew Glover	United Kingdom	
Jorgeous	Jorge Meza	United States	
Joslyn Fox	Patrick Joslyn	United States	
Jota Carajota	Juan José Torres	Spain	
Juice Boxx	Joseph Primeau	Canada	
Jujubee	Airline Inthyrath	United States	
Julian Eltinge	William Julian Dalton	United States	
Juno Birch		United Kingdom	
Juriji der Klee	Julia Carmen Rivet Jimenez	Spain / Belgium	
Just May		United Kingdom	
Kahanna Montrese	Tyrone Hardiman	United States	
Kahmora Hall	Paul Tran	United States	
Kalorie Karbdashian-Williams	Daniel Hernandez	United States	
Kam Hugh	Camille Chaillan	France	
Kameron Michaels	Dane Young	United States	
Kandy Ho	Frank Diaz Jr.	United States / Puerto Rico	
Kandy Muse	Kevin Candelario	United States	
Kaos	Jesilo Bernard	Canada	
Karamilk	Jaden Slawter	Canada	
Karen Dior	Geoffrey Gann	United States	
Karen from Finance	Richard Chadwick	Australia	
Karna Ford		New Zealand	
Karyl Norman	George Francis Peduzzi	United States	
Kate Butch	Marcus Crabb	United Kingdom	
Katya Zamolodchikova	Brian McCook	United States	
Keiona Revlon	Kevin Kouassi	France / Ivory Coast	
Kelly	Liam Kyle Sullivan	United States	
Kelly Heelton	Fausto Israel de Souza	Germany / Brazil	
Kelly Mantle		United States	
Kelly Roller	Francisco José Cabrera Martínez	Spain	
Keltnny Galliano	Katey Red	United States	
Kendall Gender	Kenneth Wyse	Canada	
Kennedy Davenport	Reuben Asberry Jr.	United States	
Kenzie Blackheart	Matt Hunt	United Kingdom	
Kerri Colby	Elyse Alessandra Anderson	United States	
Keta Minaj	Bobby Snijder	Netherlands	
Kevin Aviance	Eric Snead	United States	
Kiara	Dimitri Nana-Côté	Canada	
Kiki Coe	Sandro Pangilinan	Canada / Philippines	
Kiki DuRane	Justin Vivian Bond	United States	
Kiki Snatch		United Kingdom	
Killer	Ryan Heath Rorie	United States	
Killer Queen	Iván Solar Gil	Spain	
Kim Chi	Sang-Young Shin	South Korea	
Kim Christy	Ken Olsen	United States	
Kim Lee	Andy Nguyen	Vietnam / Poland	
Kimmy Couture		Canada / Philippines	
Kimora Amour	Justin Baird	Canada	
Kimora Blac	Von Nguyen	United States	
Kita Mean	Nick Nash	New Zealand	
Kitara Ravache	George Santos	United States	
Kitten Kaboodle	Jeffrey Christensen	Canada	
Kitty Scott-Claus	Louis Westwood	England	
Kitty Space	Kiara Denis	France / Vietnam	
Koco Caine		United States	
Kora Harcourt	Michael Boyuk	Canada	
Kori King	Rashawn King	United States	
Kornbread Jeté	Demoria Elise Williams	United States	
Krystal Versace	Luke Fenn	England	
Kween Kong	Thomas Fonua	New Zealand	
Kylie O'Reilly	Junior Larkin	Ireland	
Kylie Sonique Love		United States	
Kym Chua Valencia	Keb Cuevas	Philippines	
Kyne	Kyne Santos	Canada / Philippines	
Kyran Thrax	Kyran Peet	England	
La Big Bertha	Loïc Assemat	France	
La Briochée	Maëva Trioux	France	
La Diamond	Enrico La Rocca	Italy	
La Grande Dame	Yannick Martin Androf	France	
La Kahena	Malek Ben Halima	France / Tunisia	
Lady Boom Boom	Henri Delisle Langlois	Canada	
Lady Bunny	Jon Ingle	United States	
Lady Camden	Rex Wheeler	United States / United Kingdom	
Lady Catiria	Catiria Reyes	Puerto Rico	
The Lady Chablis	Benjamin Edward Knox	United States	
Lady Clover Honey	Kevin Clover Welsh	United States	
Lady Gagita	Vinzon Leojay Rubia Booc	Philippines	
Lady MAGA	Ryan Woods	United States	
Lady Morgana		Philippines	
Lady Red Couture	Kareemia Baines	United States	
Laganja Estranja	Jay Jackson	United States	
Lagoona Bloo	David Brumfield	United States	
Laila McQueen	Tyler Devlin	United States	
LaLa Ri	LaRico Potts	United States	
Lashauwn Beyond		United States	
Latrice Royale	Timothy Wilcots	United States	
La Voix	Chris Dennis	United Kingdom	
LaWhore Vagistan	Kareem Khubchandani	United States	
Lawrence Chaney	Lawrence Maidment	United Kingdom / Scotland	
Lana Ja'Rae	Braylon Ja'Rae Jackson	United States	
La Niña Delantro	Aura Ibáñez Guerrero	Spain	
Larry Grayson	William Sulley White	United Kingdom	
La Zavaleta	Diego	United States	
Lazy Susan	Robbie Sinclair Ten Eyck	Australia	
Le Cocó	Álvaro Muñoz de Gracia	Spain	
Lee Brewster	Lee Brewster	United States	
Leexa Fox	Axeel Díaz Gutierrez	Mexico	
Le Fil	Philip Li	United Kingdom	
Le Filip	Filip Mrzljak	France / Croatia	
Lemon	Christopher Baptista	Canada / United States	
Leona Winter	Rémy Solé	France	
Lexi Love	Clair Barnes	United States	
Lia Clark	Rhael Lima de Oliveira	Brazil	
Lilith LaCroix	Gareth Farr	New Zealand	
Lill	Paddy Redmond	United Kingdom	
Lil Miss Hot Mess	Harris Kornstein	United States	
Lilo Wanders	Ernst-Johann Reinhardt	Germany	
Lily Savage	Paul O'Grady	United Kingdom	
Lily White	Andrew Tribble	United States	
Lina Galore	Giovanni Montuori	Italy	
Lineysha Sparx	Andrew Trinidad	United States / Puerto Rico	
Lolita Banana	Esteban Inzúa	France / Mexico	
Lolita Golightly	Sabrina Pretto	Italy	
Loosey LaDuca	Timothy Rinaldi	United States	
Lori Shannon	Don Seymour McLean	United States	
Lova Ladiva	Sébastien Ducellier	France	
Love Connie	John Cantwell	United States	
Love Masisi	Pierre Alexandre	Haiti / Netherlands	
Lucky Starzzz	Alain Castaneda	United States / Cuba	
Lucy Belle LeMay	Johnnie McLaughlin	United States	
Lulla la Polaca	Andrzej Szwan	Poland	
Luna DuBois	Tom VanDyne	Canada / Nigeria	
Luna Lansman	Abraham Sinue Luna Ortiz	Mexico	
Luquisha Lubamba	Luca Marchi	Italy	
Lushious Massacr	Martin De Luna Jr.	United States	
Luxx Noir London	Justin Reed	United States	
Luz Violeta	Sebastián Aguirre	Chile	
Lydia B Kollins	Nicholas Fry	United States	
Lypsinka	John Epperson	United States	
The Macarena	Isabeau Garabito Lopez	Spain	
Machine Dazzle	Matthew Flower	United States	
Madame LaQueer	Cassie Melendez	United States / Puerto Rico	
Madame Zhu-Zhu / Norma Pospolita	Edward Tarletski	Belarus	
Madam Pattirini	B. Morris Young	United States	
Maddelynn Hatter		United States	
Maddy Morphosis	Daniel Truitt	United States	
Madea	Tyler Perry	United States	
Mademoiselle Boop	Renaud Delauvaux	Belgium	
Madge Weinstein	Richard Bluestein	United States	
Mado Lamotte	Luc Provost	Canada	
Maebe A. Girl	G. Pudio	United States	
Maisie Trollette	David Raven	United Kingdom	
Maj Gadd	Roger Jönsson	Sweden	
Makayla Couture	Makayla Walker	Canada	
Malcolm Scott	Malcolm Scott	United Kingdom	
Mama Tits	Brian Peters	United States	
Mami Watta	William Pedia	France / Ivory Coast	
Mandy Moobs	Andrew Goldberg	Australia	
Manila Luzon	Karl Philip Westerberg	United States / Philippines	
Marcia Marcia Marcia	Marty Lauter	United States	
Margaret Y Ya	Edo Peltier	Mexico	
Margo Howard-Howard	Robert Hesse	United States	
Marguarite LeMay	Michael Hayes	United States	
María Edilia	Edixon Felipe Calanche Varela	Venezuela / Spain	
Mariah Paris Balenciaga	Elijah Kelly	United States	
María Magdalena	Fabián Cháirez	Mexico	
Marina	Joan López Galo	Spain	
Marina Summers	Adrian Matthew Guinto Alabado	Philippines	
Mario Montez	René Rivera	Puerto Rico	
Marisa Prisa	Javier Eijo Perales	Spain	
Marlenna	Tomaž	Slovenia	
Marmalade	Jack Bourton	Wales	
Mars		United States	
Marsha P. Johnson	Malcolm Michaels	United States	
Mary Dale	Charles Busch	United States	
Mary Morgan	Georg Preuße	Germany	
Matilduh	Matthew Angelo Lahoz Filart	Philippines	
Matraka	Gerardo Reyes Toledo	Mexico	
Max	Max Malanaphy	United States	
Maxi Glamour	Maximus Ademaus Glamour	United States	
Maxi Shield	Kristopher Elliot	Australia	
Maxie	Jayvhot Galang	Philippines	
May McFettridge	John Linehan	United Kingdom	
Maya the Drag Queen	Alex Mathew	India	
Mayhem Miller	Dequan Johnson	United States	
Meatball	Logan Jennings	United States	
Megami	Jonathan Soto-Reyes	United States	
Megui Yeillow	Guillermo Flores Asencio	Spain	
Melinda Verga	Mike Derrada	Canada / Philippines	
Melissa Bianchini		Italy	
Mercedes Iman Diamond	Curran	United States / Kenya	
Michael Marouli	Michael Marouli	United Kingdom	
Michele Bruno	Michele Bruno	South Africa	
Michelle DuBarry	Russell Alldread	Canada	
Michelle Ross	Earl Barrington Shaw	Canada / Jamaica	
Milan	Dwayne Cooper	United States	
Milk	Daniel Donigan	United States	
Mimi Imfurst	Braden Chapman	United States	
Minhi Wang	David Shih-Ming Yao	Canada / Australia	
Minnie Cooper	Aaron Farley	Australia	
Minty Fresh	Min Ortiz	Philippines	
Miranda Lebrão		Brazil	
Mirage	Dean Sproule	United States	
Miss Chief Eagle Testickle	Kent Monkman	Canada	
Miss Coco Peru	Clinton Leupp	United States	
Miss Fame	Kurtis Dam-Mikkelsen	United States	
Miss Fiercalicious	Paulo Fortes	Canada	
Miss Foozie	John Foos	United States	
Miss Gimhuay	Warit Kesmanee	Thailand	
Miss Jason	Jason Sutton	United Kingdom	
Miss Hope Springs	Ty Jeffries	United Kingdom	
Miss J	J. Alexander	United States	
Miss Moço	Adam Moco	Canada / Portugal	
Miss Naomi Carter	Giran Bittaye	United Kingdom	
Miss Opal Foxx	Benjamin Smoke	United States	
Miss Shangay Lily	Enrique Hinojosa Vázquez	Spain	
Miss Understood	Alexander Heimberg	United States	
Mistress Isabelle Brooks	Israel	United States	
Misty Phoenix	Ulysse	France	
Miz Cracker	Maxwell Heller	United States	
Mo Heart	Kevin Richardson	United States	
Mocha Diva	Jay Venn	Philippines / Hong Kong	
Molly Poppinz	Ricky Eldridge	Australia	
Mona de Grenoble	Alexandre Aussant	Canada	
Mona Foot	Nashom Wooden	United States	
Monét X Change	Kevin Bertin	United States	
Monica Beverly Hillz	Monica DeJesus-Anaya	United States	
Monikkie Shame	Nathan Wayne	United States	
Moon	Ava Matthey	Switzerland	
Morfina		Spain	
Morgana Cosmica	Claudio Marseglia	Italy	
Morgan McMichaels	Thomas White	United States / Scotland	
Morphine Love Dion	Michelle Orozco	United States / Nicaragua	
Mrs Brown	Brendan O'Carroll	Ireland	
Mrs. Kasha Davis	Edward Popil Jr.	United States	
Mrs. Shufflewick	Rex Jameson	United Kingdom	
Mya Foxx	Dillon Ross	Canada	
Myra DuBois	Gareth Joyner	United Kingdom	
Mystique Summers Madison	Donté Sims	United States	
Myx Chanel	Shawn Landayan	Philippines	
M1ss Jade So	Jade Rhian So	Philippines	
Naia Black	Timothy Brian Black	Philippines	
Naomi Smalls	Davis Heppenstall	United States	
Natalia Pliacam	Assadayut Khunviseadpong	Thailand	
Natasha Semmynova	Vítor José da Silva Fernandes	Portugal	
Naysha Lopez	Fabian Rodriguez	United States	
Nearah Nuff	Dallyn Gray-Forrest	Canada	
Nehellenia	Emanuele Aruta	Italy	
Neil Burgess	Neil Burgess	United States	
Nicky Doll	Karl Sanchez	France / United States	
Nicky Monet		United States	
Nicole Onoscopi	Cole Cozart	United States	
Nicole Paige Brooks	Brian Christopher Pryor	United States	
Nicole the Great	Nicole Murray-Ramirez	United States	
Nikki Champagne	Taylor Small	United States	
Niles Marsh	Niles Marsh	United States	
Nina Bo'Nina Brown	Pierre Leverne Dease	United States	
Nina de la Fuente	Vicente Arias	Mexico	
Nina Flowers	Jorge Luis Flores Sanchez	United States / Puerto Rico	
Nina West	Andrew Robert Levitt	United States	
Niohuru X		China	
Nymphia Wind	Leo Tsao	United States / Taiwan	
Obama	Baye Dame Dia	Italy / Senegal	
Océane Aqua-Black	Thierry Boily-Simard	Canada / Haiti	
Olivia Dreams		New Zealand	
Olivia Lux	Fred Carlton Bunton	United States	
Ongina	Ryan Ong Palao	United States	
Onya Nurve	Justin Woody	United States	
Onyx	Pablo Javier Garcia de Durango Caveda	Spain	
Organzza	Vinícius Andrade	Brazil	
Orion Story	Chance Lambert	United States	
Orlando Lansdorf	Orlando Lansdorf	Netherlands / Suriname	
ØV Cünt		Philippines	
Pabllo Vittar	Phabullo Rodrigues da Silva	Brazil	
Paige Turner / Showbiz Spitfire	Daniel Frank Kelley	United States	
Pakita / Fransiska Tólika	Francisco José Venegas Morales	Spain	
Paloma	Hugo Bardin	France	
Pandora Boxx	Michael Steck	United States	
Pandora Nox	Pandora Bösmüller	Austria	
Pangina Heals	Pan Pan Narkprasert	Thailand	
Panti	Rory O'Neill	Ireland	
Paolo Ballesteros	Paolo Elito Macapagal Ballesteros IV	Philippines	
Paris Dupree		United States	
París Galán	Carlos Felipe Parra Heredia	Bolivia	
Patruni Sastry	Patruni Chidananda Sastry	India	
Patsy Vidalia	Irving Ale	United States	
Pattie Gonia	Wyn Wiley	United States	
Pauline Pantsdown	Simon Hunt	Australia	
Peaches Christ	Joshua Grannell	United States	
Pearl Liaison	Matthew Lent	United States	
Penny Tration	Anthony Cody	United States	
Pepper Highway	Keith Cole	Canada	
Pepper LaBeija		United States	
Pepper Pepper	Kaj-anne Pepper	United States	
Peppermint	Agnes Moore	United States	
Perla	Paul Conrad Schneider	Canada	
Phi Phi O'Hara	Jaremi Carey	United States	
Phoenix	Brian Trapp	United States	
Piche	Mike Gautier	France	
Pink Chadora	Martín de Arriba	Spain	
Pitita	Bernat Bordes Vendrell	Spain	
Pixie Pixie	Pedro Antonio González Marín	Mexico	
Pixie Polite	Mark Wickens	United Kingdom	
Plane Jane	Andrew Dunayevskiy	United States	
Plasma	Taylor Ratliff	United States	
Plastique Tiara	Duc Tran Nguyen	United States / Vietnam	
Poison Waters	Kevin Cook	United States	
Pollo Del Mar	Paul Pratt	United States	
Pollyfilla	Colin McLean	New Zealand	
Pomara Fifth	Brad Kennedy	Australia	
Precious Paula Nicole	Rodolfo Hontiveros Gabriel II	Philippines	
Prince	Prince de Castro	Philippines	
The Princess	Adam Biga	United States	
Princess Poppy	Thomas Schmidt	United States	
Priscilla	Mariano Gallo	Italy	
Priyanka	Mark Suknanan	Canada	
La Prohibida	Amapola López	Spain	
Punani	Jules Faure	France	
Pupi Poisson	Alberto Zimmer	Spain	
Pura Luka Vega	Amadeus Fernando Magallanes Pagente	Philippines	
Pussy Tourette	Mark Cliser	United States	
PutoMikel	Mikel Herrán Subiñas	Spain	
Pythia	Christos Darlasis	Canada / Greece	
Q	Robert Severson	United States	
Queen Harish	Harish Kumar	India	
Queenie	Michael Greer	United States	
Rachel	Ben Schatz	United States	
Ray Bourbon	Hallie Board Waddell	United States	
Raja Gemini	Sutan Ibrahim Karim Amrullah	United States	
Ra'Jah O'Hara	Bennie Miller	United States	
Rani Ko-HE-Nur	Sushant Divgikar	India	
Raven	David Petruschin	United States	
Regina Fong	Reg Bundy	United Kingdom	
Regina Gently	Reg Vermue	Canada	
Regina Voce	Anuar Kuri	Mexico	
Rhea Litré	Joshua Miller	United States	
Rickard Engfors	Rickard Engfors	Sweden	
Rileasa Slaves	Kiraly Saint Claire	England / Saint Lucia	
Rita Baga	Jean-François Guèvremont	Canada	
Rita Menu		New Zealand	
Roky Stjerne	Roky Mendoza	Norway	
Robbie Turner	Jeremy Baird	United States	
Robert Fux	Robert Fux	Sweden	
Robin Fierce	Rashawn Lee Jr.	United States	
Rock M. Sakura	Bryan Bradford	United States	
Rogéria	Astolfo Barroso Pinto	Brazil	
Rosé	Ross McCorkell	United States / Scotland	
Roxxxy Andrews	Michael Feliciano	United States	
RuPaul	RuPaul Andre Charles	United States	
Russella	Russell David	United Kingdom	
Rusty Ryan	Robert Brian Timbrell	Canada	
Sagittaria	Iván Flores	Spain	
Sahara Davenport	Antoine Ashley	United States	
Saint	Shaquille Foreman	United States	
Saki Yew	Jeffrey Trinidad	Australia / Philippines	
Salina EsTitties	Jason De Puy	United States	
Saltina Shaker	Jesse Lesniowski	Canada	
Sam Star	Sam Purkey	United States	
Samantha	Sammy Duddy	Ireland	
Samantha Ballentines	Francisco José Sánchez Jiménez	Spain	
Sami Landri	Samuel Landry	Canada	
Sandra Montiel	Sandra Almodóvar	Spain	
Sanjina DaBish Queen		Canada	
Sapphira Cristál	O'Neill Haynes	United States	
Sara Forever	Matthieu Barbin	France	
Sasha Belle / Frisbee Jenkins	Jared Breakenridge	United States	
Sasha Colby	Sasha Kekauoha	United States	
Sasha Velour	Alexander Hedges Steinberg	United States	
Sassy Science / Crisis Artrítica	Mario Peláez-Fernández	Spain	
Sas Who Maa	Patruni Sastry	India	
Scaredy Kat	Ally Cubb	England	
Scarlet Adams	Anthony Price	Australia	
Scarlet Envy	Jacob Grady	United States	
Scarlett BoBo	Matthew Cameron	Canada	
Scarlett Harlett	Harry Mulvany	England	
Sederginne	Serge Quik	Belgium	
Serena ChaCha	Myron Morgan	United States / Panama	
Shangela	Chantaize Darius Jeremy Pierce	United States	
Shannel	Bryan Watkins	United States	
Sharonne	Cristóbal Garrido Pinto	Spain	
Sharon Needles	Aaron Coady	United States	
Shea Couleé	Jaren Merrell	United States	
Shequida	Gary Hall	United States / Jamaica	
Sherry Pie	Joey Gugliemelli	United States	
Sherry Vine	Keith Levy	United States	
Shirley	Ed Wood	United States	
Shirley Q. Liquor	Chuck Knipp	United States	
Shirley Temple Bar	Declan Buckley	Ireland	
Shontelle Sparkles	Shawn Berger Jr.	United States	
Shuga Cain	Jesus Martinez Jr.	United States	
Sigourney Beaver		United States	
Silky Nutmeg Ganache		United States	
Silvetty Montilla	Silvio Cássio Bernardo	Brazil	
Simone	Perry Watkins	United States	
Sin Wai Kin	Sin Wai Kin	Canada	
Sisi Superstar	Simon Fortin	Canada	
Sister Boom Boom	Jack Fertig	United States	
Sister Roma	Michael Williams	United States	
Sister Sister	Philip Doran	United Kingdom / England	
Sivanna	Siv Ngesi	South Africa	
Sky Gilbert	Schuyler Lee Gilbert Jr.	Canada	
Sminty Drop	Callum Shaw	England	
Soa de Muse		France / Martinique	
Sofía Camará	Pablo Carayani Camará	Argentina	
Soju	Tony Hyunsoo Ha	United States / South Korea	
Sonja Sajzor	Sonja Sajzor	Serbia	
Spankie Jackzon	Blair Macbeth	New Zealand	
Spice	Luca Coyle	United States	
Stacy Layne Matthews	Stacy Jones	United States	
Stan Munro	Stan Munro	Wales	
Starlet		England / South Africa	
Stephanie Prince	Stephen Pasay	Canada / Philippines	
Sugar	Cooper Coyle	United States	
Suki Doll	André Pham	Canada	
Summer Lynne Seasons	Brent Blackwell	United States	
Sum Ting Wong	Bo Zeng	England	
Super Tekla	Romeo Librada	Philippines	
Supremme de Luxe	Daniel Blesa	Spain	
Susan	Jérôme Depriestre	Belgium	
Suzie Toot	Benjamin Shaevitz	United States	
Sweet Evening Breeze	James Herndon	United States	
Sweet Raspberry	Mark Morrisroe	United States	
Sylvester	Sylvester James Jr.	United States	
Sylvia Rivera	Sylvia Rivera	United States	
Symone	Reggie Gavin	United States	
Synthia Kiss	Daniel Finlan	Canada	
Sypario	Filippo Caterino	Italy	
T. C. Jones	Thomas Craig Jones	United States	
Tabboo!	Stephen Tashjian	United States	
Taiga Brava	Julio Iván Lemus Huerta	Mexico	
Talula Bonet	Tal Kalay	Israel	
Tamara Mascara	Raphael Massaro	Austria	
Tamisha Iman	Will Crawford	United States	
Tammie Brown	Keith Glen Schubert	United States	
Tandi Iman Dupree		United States	
Tara Nova	Lukus Oram-Feltham	Canada	
Tatianna	Joey Santolini	United States	
Tayce	Tayce Szura-Radix	United Kingdom / Wales	
Taylor Sheesh	John Mac Lane Coronel	Philippines	
ted northe	Ted Northe	Canada	
Tempest DuJour	Patrick Holt	United States	
Tessa Testicle	Lorenzo Ciciro	Switzerland	
Thorgy Thor	Shane Galligan	United States	
Tia Kofi	Lawrence Bolton	United Kingdom / England	
Tiffany Ann Co.		Canada / Vietnam	
Tina Burner	Kristian Seeber	United States	
Tita Baby	Ryan Pronstroller	Philippines	
Titty Galore	Alexander Chapman	Canada	
Tomara Thomas	Thomas Adams	United Kingdom	
Tomboy	Thomas Bickham	Denmark	
Toni April	April Ashley	United Kingdom	
Toñizonte	José Antonio Rodríguez	Peru	
Tony Midnite	Tony Murdoch	United States	
Tracey Lee	Maxwell Ritchie	Australia	
Tracy Trash	Marc-André Leclair	Canada	
Trampolina	Chris Dilley; Charles Romain; Spencer Brown	United States	
Trevor Ashley	Trevor Ashley	Australia	
Trinity K. Bonet	Veronica Jones Jr.	United States	
Trinity the Tuck	Ryan Taylor	United States	
Trixie	Maurice Kelly; Kevin Kirkwood; Tom Gualtieri; Jeff Manabat	United States	
Trixie Mattel	Brian Firkus	United States	
Turing		Philippines	
Tynomi Banks	Sheldon McIntosh	Canada	
Tyra Sanchez	James Ross IV	United States	
Ühu Betch	James B. Whiteside	United States	
Uma Gahd	Ryan Sauvé	Canada	
Usha Didi Gunatita		Paraguay	
Utica Queen	Ethan Mundt	United States	
Vaginal Davis		United States	
Valentina	Valentina Xunaxi Leyva	United States / Mexico	
Vanda Miss Joaquim	Azizul Mahathir	Singapore	
Vander Von Odd	Antonio Yee	United States	
Vanessa Van Cartier	Vanessa Crokaert	Netherlands / Belgium	
Vanessa Vanjie Mateo	Jose Cancel	United States / Puerto Rico	
Van Goth	Blake Harris	Canada	
Vania Vainilla	Diego Millán Tarrason	Spain	
Vanity Milan	Christopher Adamson	United Kingdom / England	
Vanity Vain	Linus Mauritz	Sweden	
Varla Jean Merman	Jeffery Roberson	United States	
Vaselina	Jerry Friedman	United States	
Veda Beaux Reves	Enda McGrattan	Ireland	
Velma Jones	Ariane Laguë-Barrette	Canada	
Venedita Von Däsh	Borja Lisón	Spain	
Venus	Venus Sherwood	Canada	
Venus D-Lite	Adam Guerra	United States	
Vera Verão	Jorge Lafond	Brazil	
Verka Serduchka	Andriy Mykhailovych Danylko	Ukraine	
Veronica Green	Kevin Grogan	United Kingdom / England	
Vicci Laine / Betty Blow Back	Kay Mullinax	United States	
Vic Ford	George William Spinks	United Kingdom	
Vicki Vivacious	Aaron Johns	United Kingdom	
Victoria Black	Demetrio Asciutto	United States	
Victoria "Porkchop" Parker	Victor Bowling	United States	
Victoria Scone	Emily Diapre	United Kingdom / Wales	
Victoria Shakespears	Vitor Hugo Souza	Brazil / Switzerland	
Viñas DeLuxe	Christian Ric Viñas	Philippines	
Vinegar Strokes	Daniel Jacob	United Kingdom	
Violet Chachki	Paul Dardo	United States	
Violetta J'Adore	Vasilis Theodoros Kyriakou	United Kingdom / Cyprus	
The Virgo Queen	Jaden MacPhee	Canada	
Visa	Edi David Roque García	Mexico / Spain	
Vivacious	Osmond Scott Jr.	United States / Jamaica	
Vivian Vanderpuss	Mackenzie Lemire	Canada	
The Vivienne	James Lee Williams	United Kingdom / Wales	
The Vixen	Anthony Taylor	United States	
Vizin		United States	
Voo-Doo / Selma Brügge	Willi Pape	Germany	
Vybe	Angus Roberts	Australia	
Walterina Markova	Walter Dempster Jr.	Philippines	
Wanda Wisdom	Bradley Traynor	United States	
Weebee		Canada	
West Dakota		United States	
The Widow Norton	José Sarria	United States	
Widow Von'Du	Ray Fry	United States	
Willam	Willam Belli	United States	
William Dorsey Swann	William Dorsey Swann	United States	
William Lingard	William Redworth Needham	United States	
Willow Pill	Willow Patterson	United States	
Wilma Fingerdoo	Richard Ryder	Canada	
Winnie	Irwin Keller; Nathan Marken	United States	
Xana		Canada	
Xilhouette	Wong Israel	Philippines	
Xunami Muse	Michael Alexander White	United States / Panama	
Yara Sofia	Gabriel Burgos Ortiz	United States / Puerto Rico	
Yenesi		Spain	
Yovska	Yovska Martinez Moreno	Mexico / Canada	
Yuhua Hamasaki	Yuhua Ou	United States / China	
Yuri Guaii		New Zealand	
Yvie Oddly	Jovan Bridges	United States	
Zackie Oh	Zak Kostopoulos	United States / Greece	
Zahirah Zapanta	Marc Zapanta	Philippines / United Kingdom	
Zaza Napoli	Vladim Kazantsev	Russia	
Zazu Nova		United States	
Zsa Zsa Shakespeer	Christer Lindarw	Sweden	

== See also ==
- List of RuPaul's Drag Race contestants
- List of exóticos
