= Cookie Buffet =

American drag queen

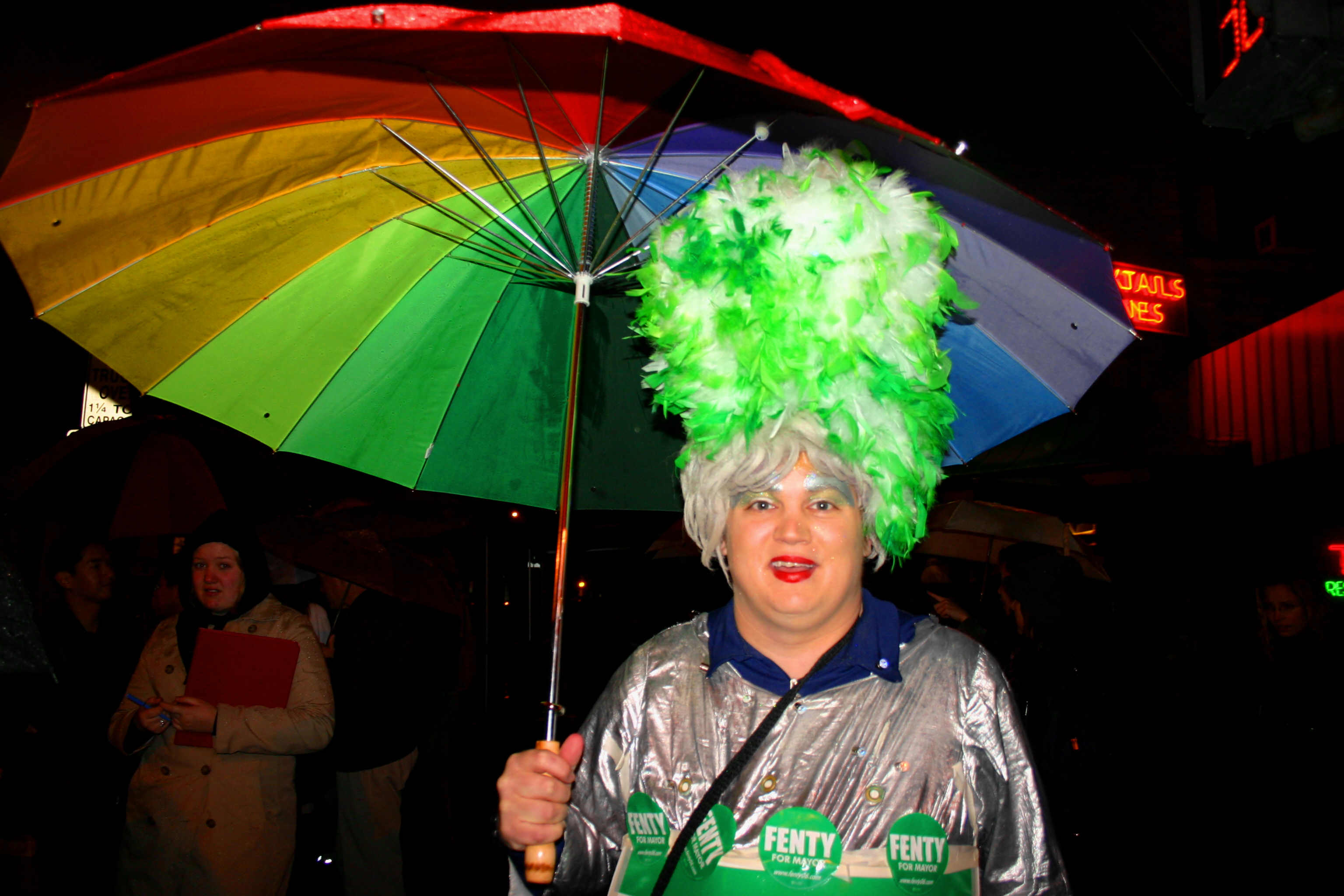
Cookie Buffet at the 2005 High Heel Drag Queen Race.

Cookie Buffet is the alter-ego of Washington, D.C., based gay rights activist Christopher Dyer. Dyer was born in Ann Arbor, Michigan on May 20, 1970 (age 55) and moved to D.C. in 1975. He has since become a fixture of the gay community there. Dyer's primary work has been with LGBTQ+ youth and he established Youth Pride Day, an annual event since 1997. It is there that Dyer appears as Cookie. Dyer has used his alter-ego to raise considerable amounts of money for the community.

Buffet/Dyer is known almost exclusively in Washington, D.C., but his popularity there is extreme and widespread. He has been elected to public office on more than one occasion, most recently in March 2005 as ANC Commissioner for the Logan Circle Neighborhood. In 2007, DC Mayor Adrian Fenty appointed Dyer to be the Director of the Mayor's Office of GLBT Affairs, a position he held until being replaced be a new mayor in 2011. In addition to Youth Pride Day, Dyer has served as program director of the 2012 Gay Men's Health Summit and is a strong proponent of using pride as a way to combat health disparities.

== See also ==
- List of drag queens
