= Alden Garrison =

American female impersonator

- Born: June 4, 1908
- Died: December 22, 1938 (aged 30); Gallinger Hospital, Washington, DC
- Resting place: Columbian Harmony Cemetery
- Occupation: Female impersonator
- Years active: 1920s and 1930s

Alden Garrison (1908–1938) was a prominent black female impersonator from Washington, DC. He performed at various nightclubs along the Atlantic Seaboard, and the national black press covered his life in detail.

Garrison was the child of Rosa Keeling and Will Garrison. He was born on June 4, 1908, and grew up in Washington, DC. At twelve years old, he debuted in a popular local variety show, The Rosetime Revue. Although he danced in costume, he likely did not begin performing as a female impersonator until adulthood.

Writing in the Baltimore Afro-American, Ralph Matthews noted that Garrison “hiked off to New York and almost became a Gene Malin or a Karyle Norman before he returned to Washington” where he had “unusual success as a night club entertainer.” By 1934, Garrison had won more than twenty “best dressed” prizes at drag balls in Baltimore and Washington, DC. He reportedly favored squirrel or mink wraps with accessories. Louis Lautier said that Garrison's “female impersonation [was] almost perfect.”

Amid an increase in policing of gender nonconformity and waning popularity of female impersonators, Garrison had little employment in the last year of his life. Upon his death, the Baltimore Afro-American printed that he “had been melancholy and subject to brooding since the death of his god-mother, who reared him from a child.” Further, he avoided friends and “drifted around the city during the past few months ill and undernourished.” He had been found lying “prostrate in a vacant lot” and later died in Gallinger Hospital.

In 2018, Kim Gallon, a historian at Purdue University, published an extensive account of Garrison's life in the Journal of the History of Sexuality. Gallon's archival research is the most significant source for this Wikipedia entry.
