= The B-Girlz =

Canadian drag comedy trio

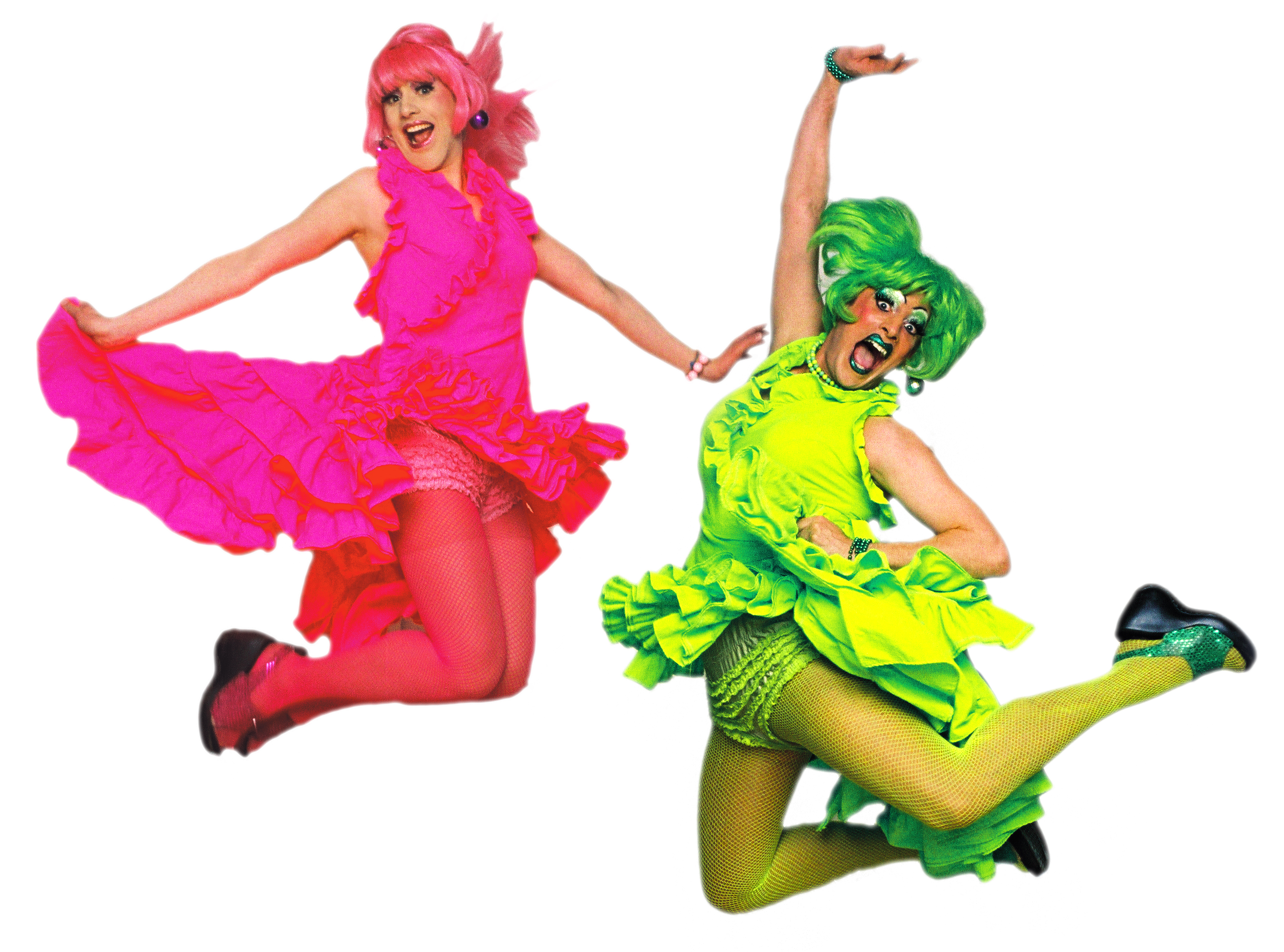
B-Girlz Barbie-Q (Pink) and Hard Kora (Green)

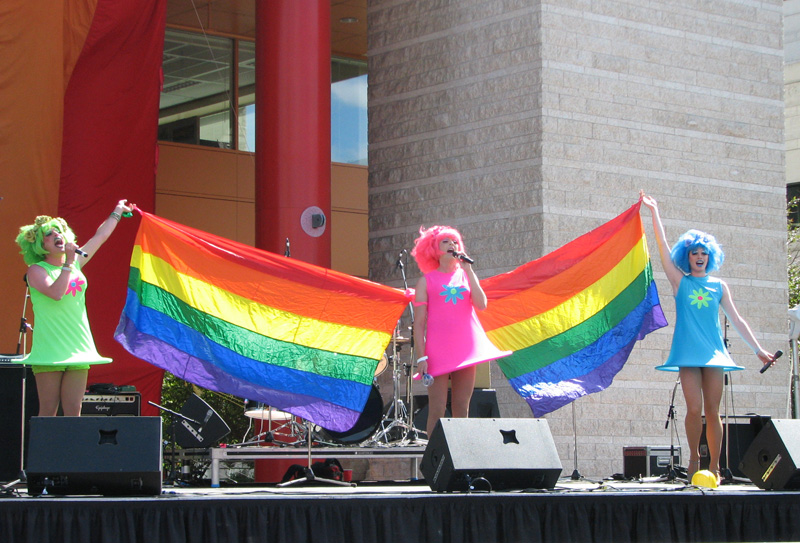
The B-Girlz performing at the 2007 Capital Pride in Ottawa

The B-Girlz are a Canadian drag comedy trio, based in Toronto, Ontario. The troupe's core members are Michael Boyuk, who performs as Kora Harcourt (Hard Kora) and Mark Peacock, who performs as Barbara Quigley (Barbie-Q); while the third member has varied at different times, with performers including Robert Windisman as Conchita Castillio and Shawn Hitchins as Ivana.

== History ==
The troupe have created a number of live cabaret shows, including B-Girlz Gone Wild!, B-Girlz on Thin Ice, Vegas Bound... and Gagged!, Dragged Across America, Attack of the Killer B's, Thoroughly Modern Girlz, The B-List and The Girlz Most Likely to B. They have toured in Canada and internationally, both with the cabaret shows and at LGBT Pride and fringe festival events.

They have also hosted regular events at Buddies in Bad Times and other venues in Toronto, including the Homo Night in Canada comedy show and the amateur talent show Goontown. Peacock, Boyuk and Hitchins have also performed with the comedy troupe Queer Comedy Collective.

The troupe have also written, created and produced a number of short films, including B-Girlz Gone Wild, Canada's Next Top Showgirl, Degrassi B-Girlz High, Ice Skate Canada, The Elevator, The Dress and Toronto! Toronto!!, which screened at the opening gala of the 2004 Inside Out Film and Video Festival in Toronto.

== See also ==
- List of drag groups
- List of drag queens
