= Yenesi =

Spanish singer, artist, and drag performer

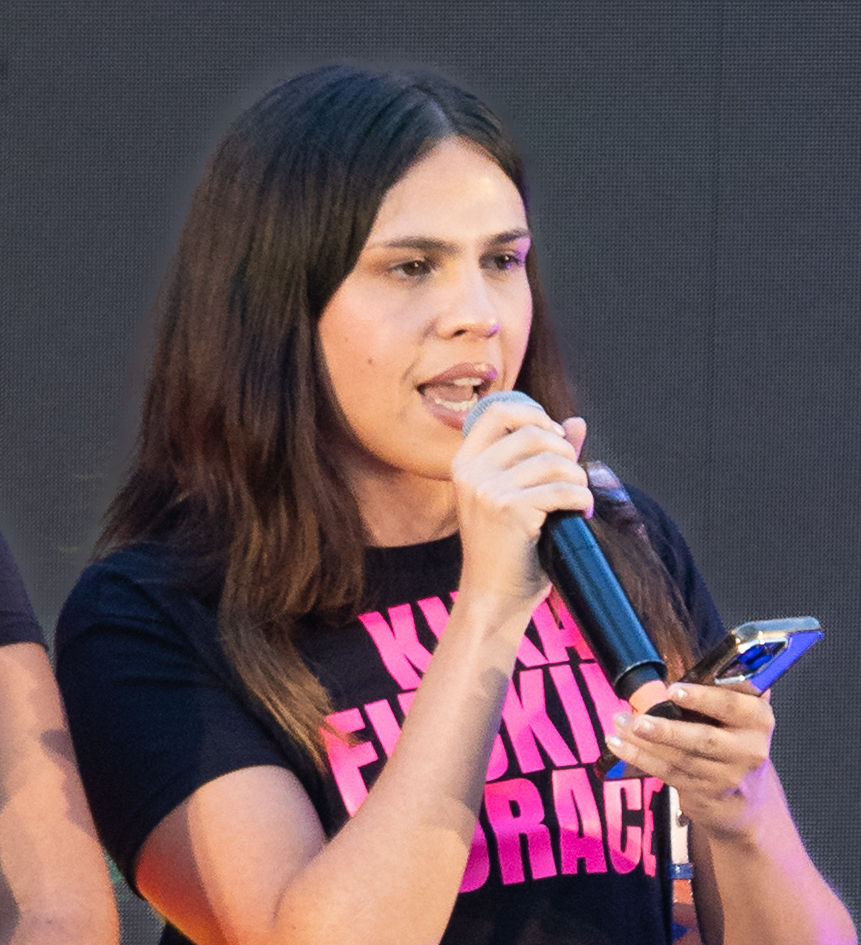
- Yenesi in 2025
- Born: November 18, 2000 (age 25); San Juan de la Arena, Asturias, Spain
- Occupations: Singer and drag performer
- Years active: 2022–present

Yenesi (born November 18, 2000) is a Spanish singer, artist, social media personality, and drag performer.

== Life and artistic career ==
Yenesi was born in San Juan de la Arena, Soto del Barco, Asturias, Spain. As a child she discovered the art of drag from watching the drags parade through the port of Ibiza. Later, at the age of 14, through the reality show RuPaul's Drag Race, she began to discover her character.

In 2022, from some videos where she did some imitations with a simple makeup, she gained popularity on the social network Twitter. Later she went viral with another video with a satirical tone. Since then, the artist has had a strong impact on the networks and has maintained a relationship with personalities such as Samantha Hudson (who is her "drag mom").

In November 2022 she participated, along with other drag artists Hugáceo Crujiente, Carmen Farala, Marcus Massalami and Morfina, in a debate on the situation of drag art in Spain in the web program Gen Playz.

== Personal life ==
Yenesi is non-binary.
