= L'Arena, Asturias =

Coordinates: 43.558611°N 6.071667°W

L'Arena San Juan de la Arena (Spanish)
- Parish
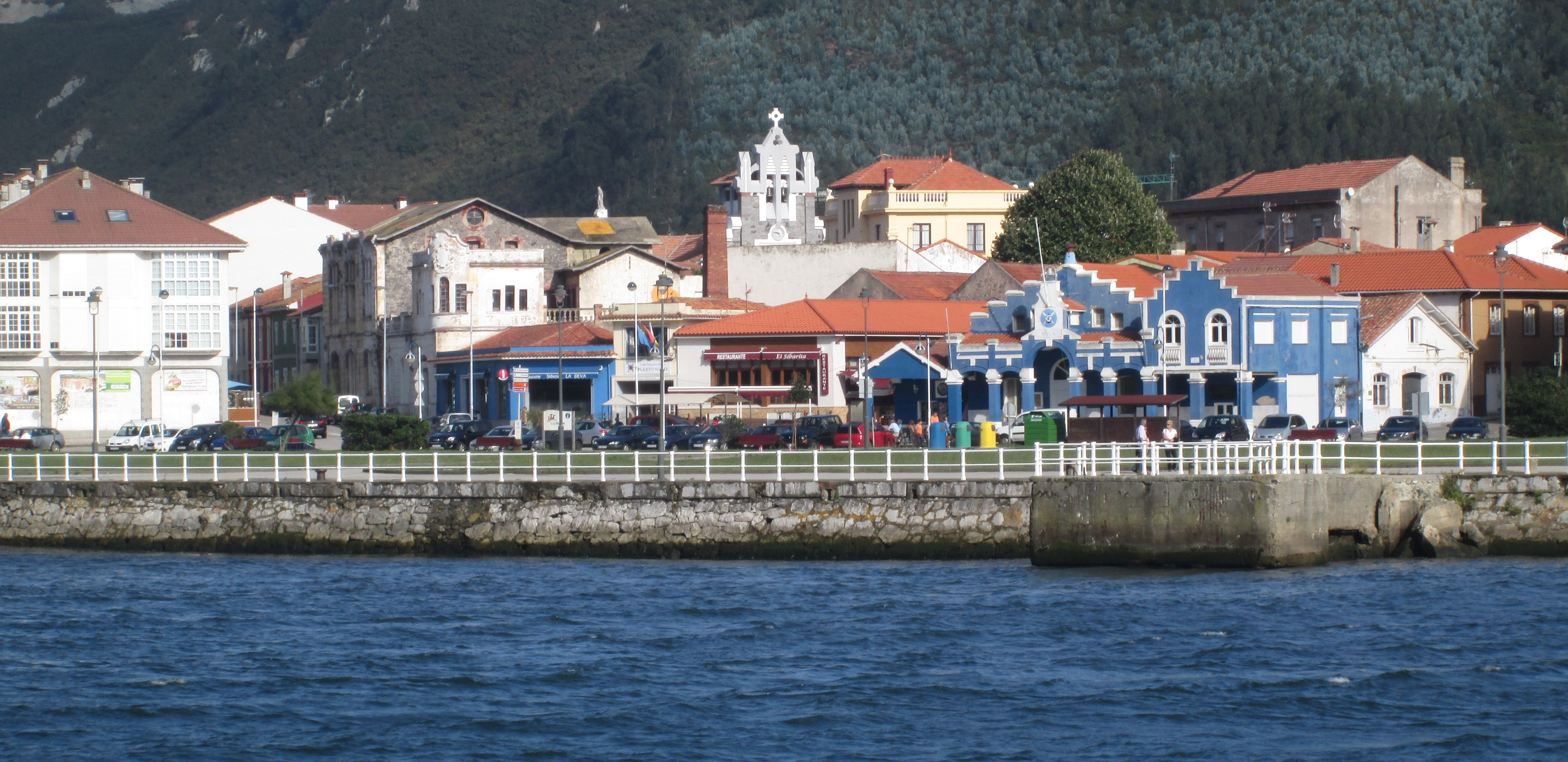
- Interactive map of L'Arena
- Country: Spain
- Region: Asturias
- Municipality: Soto del Barco

Population (2023)
  - Total: 1,387
- Postal code: 33125

L'Arena, also known by its Spanish name, San Juan de la Arena, is one of the five parishes of Soto del Barco, a municipality within the province and autonomous community of Asturias, in northern Spain. It is situated near the mouth of the river Nalón, which flows into the Cantabrian Sea. Los Quebrantos Beach is also located within the parish.

== Villages ==
- L'Arrabal
- El Barriu Chinu
- La Calea
  - La Calea de Baxu
- El Charcu
- La Llama
  - La Baxamar
- El Maumáu
- El Molinón
- El Parque
- El Picu
- Riulaveiga

== Notable people ==
- Yenesi (born November 18, 2000), Spanish singer and artist
