= The Kinsey Sicks =

American comic a cappella quartet

The Kinsey Sicks are an a cappella quartet who bill themselves as "America's Favorite Dragapella Beautyshop Quartet".

They perform both original music and lyrics as well as parodies of well-known songs a cappella. Their work, while extremely comedic, is often highly politically charged. Their name is a play of words on "Kinsey 6", the end of the Kinsey scale defined as exclusively homosexual.

== Origin ==
The Kinsey Sicks began in 1993 when a group of five friends (largely lawyers and professional activists) went to a Bette Midler concert in San Francisco, dressed as the Andrews Sisters. Assuming they would be among many drag queens, they found themselves to be the only ones. They were approached that night by a woman who asked them to perform at her upcoming 50th birthday party. Though their initial reply was, "we don't sing", the group was surprised to learn that all of them had previous musical experience.

In July 1994, The Kinsey Sicks (then consisting of Ben Schatz as "Rachel", Irwin Keller as "Winnie", Maurice Kelly as "Trixie", Jerry Friedman as "Vaselina", and Abatto Avilez as "Begoña") drew a large and enthusiastic crowd at their first public performance on a street corner in San Francisco's Castro District. A year later, Avilez died, and was never replaced, leaving the Kinsey Sicks as a quartet (a formation that has remained consistent ever since.) Since then, The Kinsey Sicks have produced and performed full-length theatrical productions and concerts around the country. The group eventually became successful enough for its members to leave their former occupations to concentrate on performance.

== Members ==
Since its initial formation, the lineup of the Kinsey Sicks has undergone several changes and iterations. Schatz has been the group's only constant through all incarnations. Each member of the group performs a fully realized character, and as new members have joined, they have been encouraged to personally expand and develop their own "history". The members of the group over the years have been:

Current Members

- Ben Schatz as "Rachel" (1993–present) – Schatz, a Harvard-trained civil rights lawyer and former Director of the National Gay and Lesbian Medical Association (renamed GLMA: Health Professionals Advancing LGBTQ+ Equality), created the first national HIV/AIDS legal project and authored Bill Clinton's HIV policy during the 1992 presidential campaign. He is now a full-time performer as a member of the Sicks. His character, "Rachel", is loudly feminist, angry, and an activist noted both for her diminutive stature, muscular build, and her refusal to shave her underarms. Though Ben retired "Rachel" from touring in 2019, he still continues to write for the group and work behind-the-scenes.
- Jeff Manabat as "Trixie" (2004–present) – Manabat, a professional musical theater-performer and graduate of UC-Berkeley, was discovered by the then-current members of the group while performing in a production of When Pigs Fly at the New Conservatory Theatre Center in San Francisco. The Asian American Manabat's casting as Trixie means that the character has actually had three ethnicities over the years. Manabat's Trixie retains all of the original elements of the character, but has, at Manabat's insistence, stopped wearing platinum blonde wigs and is more easily identifiable as Asian. Since joining the group, Manabat is responsible for musical arrangements, Trixie's inordinate glamour and soaring counter-tenor, as well as the entire group's hot couture. Manabat's "Trixie" is glamorous, and somewhat conceited, frequently referring to the other members of the group as "backup singers".
- Spencer Brown as "Trampolina" (October 2008 – present) – The Kinsey Sicks were joined in October 2008 by Spencer Brown, a Kansas City-based actor and singer, already known for his drag character Daisy Bucket (pronounced "bouquet"). His character, "Trampolina", is dim, but sweet, and sometimes slutty. Spencer is a graduate of the American Musical and Dramatic Academy in New York.
- Nathan Marken as "Winnie" (October 2014 – present) - Nathan Marken replaced Irwin Keller, who originated the role of Winnie. Nathan, based out of San Francisco, comes from a musical theatre background and adds a saucy charm to Winnie's already lovable dorky persona.
- J.B. McLendon as "Angel" (June 2019 – present) - A native of Annapolis, MD, J.B. got his BFA in Musical Theatre from Syracuse University. In his 30+ year career, he has performed in New York City, Edinburgh, Scotland, Key West, FL, 4 years of summer stock theater in the Northeast, and has toured the country three times over. Behind the scenes, he has directed, stage-managed, company-managed, box office-managed. His first play, The Present, has been produced in NYC, Los Angeles, and Annapolis, MD.

Former Members

- Irwin Keller as "Winnie" (1993–2014) – Keller, also a lawyer, received his J.D. degree from the University of Chicago Law School and was the former director of the AIDS Legal Referral Panel of the San Francisco Bay Area. Irwin authored Chicago's gay rights ordinance, passed into law in 1989. By 2002, Keller had ceased practicing law to perform full-time. He originated the character "Winnie", who is Jewish, a lesbian, and motherly with an old-fashioned sensibility.
- Abatto Avilez as "Begoña" (1993) – Though Avilez was present at the Bette Midler concert that led to the formation of the Sicks, and appeared with them at their first performance, he quickly dropped out of the group. Avilez died in 1995 and the song "Begoña's Song" was written to honor his memory and was frequently performed in concert by the Sicks.
- Jerry Friedman as "Vaselina" (1993–1999) – Friedman, former Director of Audiology at the San Francisco Hearing Center, was the son of a piano teacher. "Vaselina", said to have been born in a trailer, was trampy, sweet, and not particularly bright. Friedman, Avilez's life partner, died on May 17, 2002, in Omaha, Nebraska, of lymphoma. Friedman has been memorialized by Ben Schatz's song "Jerry's Song", which the group has performed in various shows and also appears on the album and film of I Wanna Be a Republican.
- Maurice Kelly as "Trixie" (1993–2001) – Kelly, a former project manager for Levi Strauss & Co., created the role of "Trixie" and her original platinum blonde coiffure. Kelly originated the role of Trixie and played it through the group's 2001 off-Broadway run. He made a special appearance as Trixie at the 2014 20th Anniversary Show.
- Chris Dilley as "Trampolina" (1999–2007/2008) – Dilley, an actor-musician, joined the Sicks as understudy for Friedman's "Vaselina". Trampolina was originally referred to as Vaselina's "illegible" daughter, but those references were phased out after Dilley became Friedman's permanent replacement. Like Vaselina, Trampolina filled the "dumb and slutty" stereotype of the group. After joining the group full-time, Dilley became one of the principal arrangers of the group's music. Though he retired from the group in the summer of 2007, he came back to play Trampolina in the summer season of 2008, and filled in for Manabat as Trixie in spring 2011. He also made a special appearance as Trampolina at the 2014 20th Anniversary Show.
- Kevin Kirkwood as "Trixie" (2001–2003) – Kirkwood is a professional actor-singer-dancer who was understudy for Kelly and Dilley in "Dragapella!" and was then announced as Kelly's replacement for six months while Kelly took time off. After Kelly decided not to return to the group, Kirkwood remained in the role for an additional year. Kirkwood's version of Trixie was introduced as "[Trixie's] long-lost identical twin sister, Trixie" — an absurd comment on the fact that Kirkwood is African American and Kelly is white. Aside from the racial differences, and the occasional "Trixie Houston" reference, Kirkwood's persona as "Trixie" was largely faithful to the character's original conception.
- Tom Gualtieri as "Trixie" (2002) - Gualtieri is a lyricist, writer, director and actor who stepped into the role of Trixie briefly in the spring of 2002 between the time of Kelly's departure and Kirkwood's return. Ironically, Gualtieri fit Kirkwood's understudy costume perfectly and wore it in performance until Kirkwood took over. In 2013, Gualtieri was nominated for a Drama Desk Award in the category Unique Theatrical Experience for That Play: A Solo Macbeth.
- Charles Romaine as "Trampolina" (2007–2008) – Romaine, a Los Angeles-based performer and graduate of New York University, joined the group as Dilley's understudy and, in the year after Chris Dilley's August 2007 retirement from the group, played Trampolina.

== 2001-2011: Off-Broadway, Las Vegas Run & Beyond ==
In 2001 the Kinsey Sicks produced and starred off-Broadway in the critically acclaimed DRAGAPELLA! Starring the Kinsey Sicks at New York's Studio 54. That production received a nomination for a Lucille Lortel Award for Best Musical of 2001 and a Drama Desk Award nomination for Outstanding Lyrics for lyricist Ben Schatz.

In 2006 the Kinsey Sicks performed an extended engagement at the Las Vegas Hilton. In addition, their first feature film, Kinsey Sicks: I Wanna Be a Republican, premiered at the 30th San Francisco International Lesbian and Gay Film Festival. The documentary The Kinsey Sicks: Almost Infamous, covering the history of the group and their run at the Las Vegas Hilton was released in 2008.

The group has also appeared in such venues as the Herbst Theatre and New Conservatory Theatre Center, San Francisco; Boston Center for the Arts and The Theater Offensive, Boston; Just for Laughs Comedy Festival and Club Soda, Montreal; the Nordstrom Recital Hall and The Triple Door in Seattle; the Ogden Theatre, Denver; the Colony Theatre, South Beach; the Wheeler Opera House, Aspen; Studio 54, Carolines on Broadway, and Gotham Comedy Club, New York City; Hobby Center for the Performing Arts and The Improv, Houston, Texas; Crown & Anchor and Town Hall, The Palm, Blue Chairs, and Club Manana, Provincetown. Their stage productions have included The Balled Sopranos, Motel Sicks: A Dragapella Summer Vacation, Everything But the Kitsch 'n'Synch and GreatesTits, all of which premiered at San Francisco's New Conservatory Theatre Center. They are also frequently invited to perform at colleges; those performances are usually followed by a question-and-answer session with the group, out of costume.

In 2010, the group began releasing music videos, many about current events, such as the Deepwater Horizon oil spill satire BP is Creepy, the TSA-mocking Rocky Horror Picture Show parody Touch-A Touch Me, TSA Security, a satirical video about Republican Party economic policy titled The Official GOP Economic Platform (as sung by The Kinsey Sicks), which suggests a policy of selling the poor to curb the national deficit, and the black comedy song Get A Gun about America's obsession with firearms. Other music subjects include pop icons, such as the Lady Gaga parody Bedroom Ants (after "Bad Romance") and modern internet and TV culture in videos, such as I Must Watch YouTube and Why the F@#k Aren't We Famous.

== 2012-Present ==
In 2012, The Kinsey Sicks premiered a new show commissioned by Theatre J in Washington, D.C., called Electile Dysfunction: Kinsey Sicks for President using the tag line "Sometimes it's hard being Republican," which toured through the November 2012 elections.

In 2013–14, the group celebrated its 20th anniversary touring the show America's Next Top Bachelor Housewife Celebrity Hoarder Makeover Star Gone Wild which parodies reality television while showcasing the group's wide range of musical tastes over the previous twenty years. Also released in July 2014 was a 20th anniversary historic video, The Kinsey Sicks: Live in the Castro (1994), which featured footage from the group's first-ever street performance.

On December 28, 2013, the group had a sold-out one-time homecoming performance at San Francisco's historic Castro Theatre, with encore appearances by former members of the group.

In December 2014, original member Irwin Keller (Winnie) retired from the group during their Oy Vey in a Manger tour. San Francisco-based Nathan Marken stepped in for the role of Winnie. The group premiered a brand new show featuring 21 new songs, in February 2015, with plans for a new album, and launched a successful Kickstarter campaign to send them to the Edinburgh Festival Fringe, the world's largest performing arts festival, in August 2015.

In February 2016, The Kinsey Sicks launched their new tour "Electile Dysfunction 2016". Their 9th album, Eight Is Enough, was released May 2016. That August, the group returned to the Edinburgh Festival Fringe at the Gilded Balloon with their show The Lady Cocks of Bang Boys.

In 2017, the group began touring a highly political and autobiographical show titled Things You Shouldn't Say, an abridged version of which was performed in their third year at the Edinburgh Fringe Festival. The show drew rave reviews and led to its being booked for a run at the off Broadway SoHo Playhouse in New York City.

In June 2019, The Kinsey Sicks returned to Provincetown to perform Naked Drag Queens Singing! joined by their newest member, Angel (J.B. McLendon). In January 2020, the group revamped their election year show, Electile Dysfunction. Due to COVID-19 quarantines, the tour was postponed. The group continued to produce online content for social media during the pandemic with a slew of music videos, including, "Social Distance", "Don'tcha Touch-a Touch-a Touch Me", and "The Sound of Sirens" all available on YouTube, Facebook, and Instagram.

During the pandemic, The Kinsey Sicks released another album, Quarantunes, featuring original songs and parodies relating to events surrounding the 2020 presidential election and the pandemic itself. Not until the fall of 2021 was the group back on tour with "Dragapella!" and their holiday show, Oy Vey in a Manger, which was re-recorded with the current cast members for a new album and DVD.

In March 2023, The Kinsey Sicks debuted their show Drag Queen Storytime Gone Wild, parodying children's songs and skewering right-wing American politics that sought to ban drag shows and pass anti-trans legislation around the country. The tour planned visits to cities throughout the United States and a return to the Edinburgh Fringe Festival in August.

== Discography ==
- Dragapella! (1997)
- Boyz 2 Girlz (2000)
- Sicks in the City (2002)
- I Wanna Be a Republican (2004)
- Oy Vey in a Manger: Christmas Carols and Other Jewish Music (2005)
- Sicks! Sicks! Sicks! Full Frontal New Ditties (2008)
- Each Hit & I (2010)
- Electile Dysfunction (2012)
- Eight Is Enough (2016)
- Quarantunes (2020)
- Oy Vey in a Manger (2022 Edition)

All albums available on iTunes

== Music videos ==
- BP Is Creepy (2010)
- Bedroom Ants (2010)
- Touch-A Touch Me, TSA Security (2010)
- Twisted Christmas Parodies (2010)
- Things You Shouldn't Say (2011)
- I Will Watch YouTube (2012)
- The Kinsey Sicks agree with Todd Akin (2012)
- Sell The Poor aka The Official GOP Economic Platform (as sung by The Kinsey Sicks) (2012)
- Satan Baby (2012)
- Why the F@#k Aren't We Famous (2013)
- They've Got the Whole World In Their Hands (2013)
- Girls Like (2014)
- Surprise Yourself (2014)
- The Dragapella Shuffle (2014)
- The Kinsey Sicks: Live in the Castro (1994) (released 2014)
- I Will Swallow Him (2014)
- Tranny Boy (2014)
- Let It Grow (2015)
- Crappy (2015)
- What Does Fox News Say (2015)
- Get A Gun (2015)
- Putin In the Ritz (2015)
- Don't Be Happy, Worry (2015)
- See You When Tea Is Drinkable (2016)
- We'll Be Home for Christmas (2020)
- Social Distance (2020)
- Scalia (2020)
- Let It Go (2020)
- Don'tcha Touch-a Touch-a Touch Me (2020)
- Mad Attorney General (2020)
- Which Side Are You On (2020)
- Tomorrow (2020)
- Soylent Night (2020)
- The Sound of Sirens (2020)
- Good Ventilation (2021)

The Kinsey Sicks maintain a YouTube channel for their music videos.

== See also ==
- List of drag groups
