= House of LeMay =

- Headquarters: Burlington, Vermont, U.S.
- Website: amberlive.tv

The House of LeMay is a drag performance team founded in the early 1990s by Bob Bolyard (Amber LeMay) and Michael Hayes (Margaurite LeMay). The other regular member of the team is Johnnie McLaughlin (Lucy Belle LeMay). The House of LeMay is based in Burlington, Vermont, but in their act they say they are from "The Hot Dam Trailer Park in Beaver Pond, Vermont". House of LeMay co-founder Margaurite LeMay (Michael Hayes) died in March 2023 after more than 25 years performing with the troupe.

== Work ==
The House of LeMay performs throughout the year, and they often raise money for charitable causes. They organize and host the annual "Winter is a Drag Ball", one of the Higher Ground's largest events, which raises funds for HIV/AIDS-related organizations.

The House of LeMay is the subject of the 2008 documentary, "Slingbacks and Syrup". This documentary explores the first 15 years of The House of LeMay, and illustrates how they rose from being an unknown act to widely accepted members of the community. "Slingbacks and Syrup" had its world premiere at the Vermont International Film Festival in 2008.

The House of LeMay appeared on Logo (TV channel), when the gay travel show Bump! visited Burlington, Vermont. This episode is a part of Bump! season 4, and first aired in February, 2010.

In 2020, Bob Bolyard and Russell Dreher created Amber Live!, a streaming talk show featuring Amber LeMay as the host of the show and featuring interviews with new guests each week. In addition to Amber LeMay, Russell Dreher appears as cohost and Stephen Lanza appears at the end of each show as Rocco Zamboni. Guests have included local journalists, politician John Fetterman, comedian K. Trevor Wilson and various performers.

== Awards ==
In 2009, the Honorable Bob Kiss, Mayor of Burlington, Christopher Neff, Executive Director of Outright VT, Mark Redmond, Executive Director of Spectrum Youth & Family Services, Phil Fiermonte of US Senator Sanders' office, and the staff of the RU12? Community Center gave The House of LeMay a certificate for the "Vermont GBLQT Lifetime Activism and Performing Arts Achievement Award for Outstanding leadership and commitment to bettering and entertaining the community."

Lucy Belle LeMay has repeatedly won awards in Provincetown, MA at the annual Drag Bingo fundraiser. She was named "Best Drag Queen" in 2001, and won "Biggest Hair" in 2002, 2003, 2004, and 2007. In 2008, Margaurite LeMay won "Most Outrageous Drag Queen" at this event.

In 2009 and 2010, the House of LeMay won a Daysie award for "Best Vermont Blog, non-political," from Seven Days, the newspaper that runs the annual awards.

In 2014, 2019, and 2022, the House of LeMay won a Daysie award for "Best Drag Performer or Group" from Seven Days.

In 2011 at the 13th Annual Queer Community Dinner in Vermont, The House of LeMay was named the recipients of the 2011 Queer Volunteer of the Year award.
