= Vizin =

- Born: Vizin; North Dakota, United States
- Genres: Disco
- Years active: 2007–present

Vizin (pronounced: vision) is an American drag queen and singer based in Los Angeles.

== Early life ==
A member of the Arikara people, who are part of the Three Affiliated Tribes, Vizin was raised on the Fort Berthold Reservation by a single mother. Growing up, Vizin was gender non-conforming, playing with Barbies and making skirts out of T-shirts. She became interested in singing at an early age, and at age 12 she performed "Over the Rainbow" in a school talent show.

== Career ==
She began her career in drag in the year 2007, where she took part in her first gig. She moved to Los Angeles following her mother's death in 2013.

Vizin has noted she tries to incorporate Indigeous influences into her music and performances, calling herself a "Native American Barbie doll". Her drag name, Vizin, is a reference to the vision quest, a spiritual ritual undertaken by some Native American tribes.

In 2016, she released a single titled "I Was Born This Way". It is a remake of the 1975 song by Valentino.

== Personal life ==
Vizin is two-spirit and a Christian.

Vizin was ostracized for her weight growing up. When Vizin started performing in drag, she was 700 pounds; she later lost 200 pounds after having gastric bypass surgery in 2009.

She had a close relationship with her mother, who died in 2013, and took care of her after she was diagnosed with Evans syndrome.

== Discography ==
=== Albums ===
- Chrysalis (2021)

=== Singles ===
- "You Make Me Feel"
- "I Was Born This Way"
- "With You" (2021)
- "Take Me Home" (2022)

=== Charted singles ===
Title	Year	Peak chart positions
Title	Year	US Club
	2016	24

== See also ==
- Indigenous drag performers
