= High Heel Drag Queen Race =

Annual drag queen race in Washington, D.C.

- Promotional logo from 2011
- Frequency: Annual
- Locations: Dupont Circle, Washington, D.C.
- Inaugurated: 1986
- Organiser: Eyebeam Creative LLC

The High Heel Drag Queen Race is an informal costumed drag queen race in Washington, D.C. Each year on the Tuesday before Halloween (October 31), thousands of spectators come to Dupont Circle to watch as 100 or so costumed drag queens show off their elaborate outfits and race down 17th Street. Bars and restaurants along the route prepare special drinks and dishes for the occasion.

== History ==
Twenty-five contestants entered the first high heel drag race held outside JR's Bar & Grill (at 1529 17th St NW) on Halloween 1986. The midnight dash went one and a half blocks to Annie's Paramount Steak House where the racers ran upstairs for a shot of schnapps, then down the stairs and back down the street to JR's. Clinton Winter won the race and a bottle of champagne.

Dave Perruzza, general manager of JR's organized the event for its first 25 years. He organized hundreds of volunteers to help carry out the event and clean up afterward. He worked with the police to change the event to the Tuesday before Halloween, as a way of thinning the growing crowds. In 2011, at the 25th anniversary he stepped down as organizer giving the responsibility to the organization Historic Dupont Circle Main Streets.

On the 25th anniversary in 2011, DC Mayor Vince Gray, served as grand marshal of the event. Upwards of 100,000 spectators were expected for the 25th anniversary. The official estimate for attendees in 2024 was over 10,000.

== Influences ==
The race has influenced the creation of similar drag races in other countries. The Albert Kennedy Trust, a charity that works for LGBT youth who are homeless or in hostile living environments, started the Annual Soho Drag Race in September 2011. The race centred on Soho Square in Soho, London.
