= Miss Shangay Lily =

Spanish drag queen, writer, actor and director

- Miss Shangay Lily with his characteristic turban
- Born: Enrique Hinojosa Vázquez; March 1, 1963; Málaga, Andalucía, Spain
- Died: April 11, 2016 (aged 53); Madrid, Spain

Enrique Hinojosa Vázquez (March 1, 1963 – April 11, 2016), known professionally as Miss Shangay Lily, was a Spanish drag queen, writer, actor, and director.

== Biography ==
A radical feminist, Miss Shangay Lily became a pioneer Queer activist and social agitator in Spain's incipient gay rights movement, combining entertainment and politics in a unique tea dance that swiftly became the toast of Madrid's then-blooming gay liberation movement. He soon cemented his credentials as a unique LGBT activist by creating Spain's first free gay magazine, Shangay Express, a mixture of humor and politics.

He immediately became visible on television with his witty statements and some unprecedented and infamous appearances in A-list events. His uniqueness was due to the sociological fact that until he appeared, the only transgender presence in the country, besides transsexuals and transvestites, were female impersonators who did not take a major part in politics. This could explain why his mixture of activism and entertainment came to the fore in the 90s Spanish gay scene. His subversive performances helped collect a sense of community in Madrid, centering on Chueca, the city's well-known gay neighborhood.

Another moment was his hosting the Spanish premiere of The Adventures of Priscilla, Queen of the Desert, riding in an exact replica of the film's lavender bus to pick up the movie's director Stephan Elliott, then riding across the city, performing on its amazed streets, and hosting its first ever drag party. This event provoked a media frenzy.

From this visibility stemmed his role in one of Spain's "new comedy" films, Boca a boca (Mouth to Mouth) (1995), with Javier Bardem.

Becoming the first openly gay personality on national television, where he promoted his anti-heteronormative politics during an increasingly conservative era under the Partido Popular, he came under attacks that hampered his ascent. But, although he was viewed more and more as an alternative culture or underground performer, he worked on some of the most important primetime shows and soon became a mainstream household name.

He then turned to literature and confirmed his maverick position by publishing four books with some of Spain's major publishing houses, an unheard-of feat for a drag queen. His works include the non-fiction books Hombres... y otros animales de compañia ("Men and other pets") and Mari, ¿me pasas el poppers? ("Sis', could you pass me the poppers?") and the novels Escuela de glamour ("Glamour school") and Machistófeles ("Machistophele"). His fifth book is on its way: a new novel about his years in Queer New York City and the Crystal Meth crisis.

His work in television continued with his own television show, an indie talk show about literature and art called Shangay Café, that ran for four seasons in a small TV network; he also worked in the theatre. He came to TV prominence once again by taking part in a very popular reality television show in Spain: "La Granja de los famosos".

In 2005, he directed his first feature film, Santa Miguel de Molina, a portrait of the rise and decadence of the Spanish homosexual community, the corruption of some gay lobby groups, and the stigmatization of queers by the conservative urban gay elite. It was premiered in Spain's 2005 LesGaiCineMad (Madrid's Lesbian and Gay film festival).

In 2006, he started his vlog to cover a different point of view with irony, humour and an assortment of characters that reflect the gay community in a peculiar news report called "Teledivario: news from the other side of the street" .

In October 2007, he premiered in Madrid, Spain, his new theater act: "Burgayses". A show with music about the rising new class in the gay community, the bourGAYsies, set in a gay cruise.

He was a regular columnist for the newspaper Público, where he kept a blog in which he wrote especially on issues of homophobia and discrimination against the gay community, with a strong denunciation of gaypitalism.

== Personal life ==
He died on 11 April 2016, after suffering from pancreatic cancer detected at the end of 2014.

== Filmography ==
- Boca a boca (1995)
- Santa Miguel de Molina (2005)

== Television ==
- Esta noche sexo (1994)
- Esta noche cruzamos el Mississippi (1994)
- La noche prohibida (1996)
- En Exclusiva (1997)
- Corazón de... (1998)
- Quédate conmigo (2001)
- Shangay Café (2003)
- La Granja (2004)

== Bibliography ==
- Hombres... y otros animales de compañía (1999)
- Escuela de glamour (2000)
- Mari, ¿Me pasas el poppers? (2002)
- Machistófeles (2002)
- Adios, Chueca: Memorias Del Gaypitalismo: La Creación De La Marca Gay (2016)
