= Toñizonte =

Peruvian drag performer and Dancer

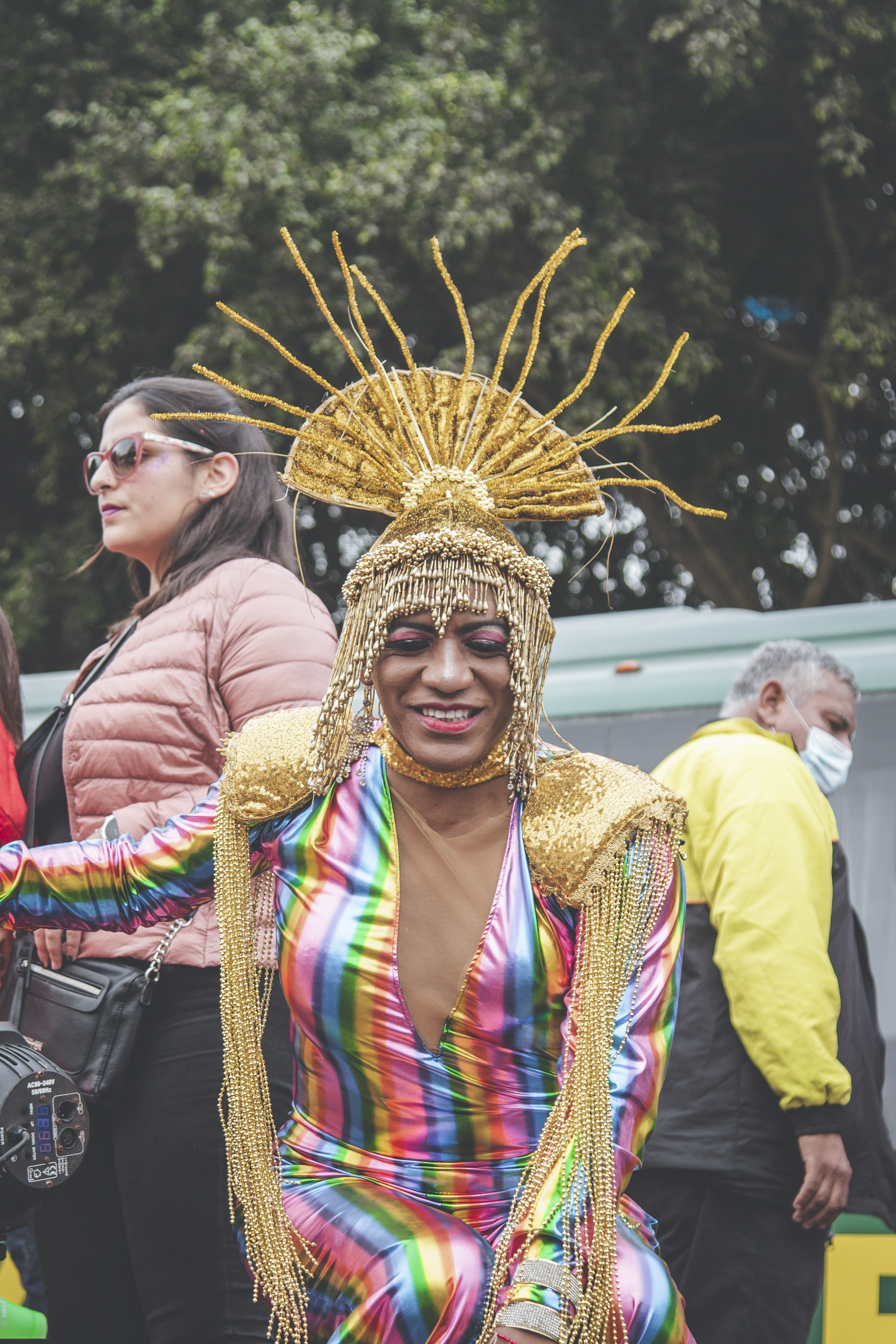
- Toñizontte in Lima Pride - 2022
- Born: José Antonio Rodríguez; 1959 (age 65–66); Peru
- Occupations: Drag queen; Dancer; TV Personality

José Antonio Rodríguez, best known by the stage name Toñizonte, also known as Toño Rodríguez, is a Peruvian drag queen, dancer, and reporter.

== Biography ==
Rodríguez grew up in the Bellavista District, of Callao in a family with five siblings, in which he was the fourth. He began university studies in accounting, but opted for theater.

A coincidence led him to an audition to be part of the company of Efraín Aguilar, he accompanied a friend to a casting, where they gave him a brief script and told him to learn some dance steps, since everyone present They had to audition. No one should be excluded. Within a few days he was called to be one of the replacement dancers, a position he never fulfilled.

In a night of changes and accidents, he ended up replacing Analí Cabrera, who could not get on the stage due to an incident shortly before the show began. This was the first time Toño Rodríguez debuted as a drag queen, he left his job as a nightclub dancer to focus on shows as a drag queen, including lip sync.

She worked with other vedettes and drag queens, such as Naamin Timoyco, Paco Ferrer and Coco Marusix, in venues such as the Perseo, Ático, or Studio One nightclubs, even as a headliner. He also worked in café-theater, alongside artists such as Alicia Andrade or Esmeralda Checa. On the recommendation of the actresses with whom she shared the stage, she enrolled in the Lima Theater Club, directed by Reynaldo Arenas.

Subsequently, he became part of the pool of artists at the Valetodo Downtown nightclub since its foundation in 2000. where she is considered one of the "mothers" of transformism.

=== Career ===
Thanks to a casting, he entered the comedy program Risas y salsa as a dancer. Some time later, in Amor, amor, amor her popularity grew after she won a costume contest for Halloween. It is in this program where he earns the nickname Toñizonte. After a contest of Amor, amor, amor, Toño Rodríguez returned to the small screen, which is why he had a section called Al estilo Toñizonte, where he made reports on different topics. In 2016, he participated in the talent contest Los reyes del playback where he imitated Yahaira Plasencia. He also participated in the program Combate, as a jury in the Combate a bailar section. However, after a while, he moved away from television.

He later returned, and in 2023 he was part of the cast of the program Jirón del humor, broadcast by Latina Televisión.

== Personal life ==
Toñizonte confessed on the Julián Zucchi and Yiddá Eslava program that one of the reasons why he left the media was his fight against cancer. However, she focused entirely on her work as drag queen at the nightclub Valetodo Downtown, located in the Miraflores District, Lima, where she has worked for approximately 20 years.

Toño Rodríguez, in Carlos Orozco's online program, revealed that he has a son who lives in Colombia and that he has not been to Peru since he was very little.

== Filmography ==
=== Television ===
Title	Role
Risas y salsa	Dancer
Amor, amor, amor	Reporter
Combate	Guest
La noche es mía	Guest
Amor y fuego	Reporter
Los reyes del playback	Contestant
Jirón del humor	Guest

=== Web Series ===
Year	Title	Role
2023	Por Dios y por la Plata	Guest
2023	Carlos Orozco	Guest
2023	Soy Gianotti	Guest
2023	Las Washas	Guest
2023	Caldo de Gallina	Guest
2023	La Molleja	Guest
2023	Qué ha pasao	Guest
2024	Embichadxs	Guest
