= Mario Peláez-Fernández =

Mario Peláez-Fernández is a science communicator best known in role as drag queen Sassy Science (or Crisis Artrítica to Spanish audiences).

== Sassy Science ==
Sassy Science is a drag queen disseminator of science and makes appearances wearing a crown and matching dress with the pattern of graphene.

Sassy Science has created YouTube videos about underrepresented minorities in STEM. Her channel has 3 main categories: "Why the hell am I doing this", "Queens who were robbed" and "Queens of today". "Queens who were robbed" focuses on members of the STEM community who did not receive academic recognition for a variety of reasons, including unfair prejudice. Lise Meitner, Rosalind Franklin and Hedy Lamarr are people featured on this series.

Sassy Science reached the semi-finals of the FameLab España 2019 science communication challenge. As part of the semi-finals, she performed a stand-up routine lasting five minutes. This routine was in front of a large audience and was also broadcast online.

In April 2019, films made by Sassy Science were screened at the Asturias Festival de Cine LGBTIQ.

In July 2019, Sassy Science was invited to perform at the Madrid launch of PRISMA (Asociación para la Diversidad Afectivo-Sexual y de Género en Ciencia, Tecnologia e Innovación), a Spanish organisation founded to increase the visibility of LGBT people in science, technology and innovation.

== Education ==
Peláez-Fernández got a degree in Physics at the University of Oviedo. An Erasmus scholarship enabled him to complete his final year at the University of Paris-Sud (now a section of Paris-Saclay) between 2013 and 2015. He completed his thesis in the Labatoire de Physique de Solides in Orsay, analysing their STEM images.

It was at the University of Paris-Sud that Peláez-Fernández specialised in nanotechnologies and nanodevices for his master's degree in fundamental physics. "A study of pristine and functionalised graphene using Scanning Tunneling Microscopy" was the focus of his master's thesis.

== Research ==
Peláez-Fernández is a PhD student at the University of Zaragoza in the Institute of Nanoscience of Aragon. He is a member of the MAGNA (Magnetismo en Nanoestructuras) Research group. The focus of his PhD is the use of transmission electron microscopy for the study of the properties of 1D and 2D materials, including graphene. It also discusses future applications of this technology, such as solar cells and touchscreens.

Peláez-Fernández's research is funded by the Enabling Excellence European project.

== Personal life ==
Peláez is non-binary.
