= Pussy Tourette =

Pussy Tourette is the stage name for an American drag queen, composer and singer.

She is best known for her single "French Bitch", for which a music video/short film directed by Andrei Rozen was made and included in the film festival compilation DVD Boys' Shorts: The New Queer Cinema. The song is a comedic, high camp dance track about the duplicitous title character who "stole my man, 'cause she felt the need to scratch an itch". The chorus is sung in Franglish and contains the wordplay, "Je suis oh-so-hot! Vous-voulez my twat, s'il vous plait?". The song was remixed for club play and was well-received in gay venues.

== Discography ==
=== Albums ===
- In Hi-Fi! (1993)
- Who Does She Think She Is? (1995)
- ep1 (2007)

=== Singles ===
- "French Bitch" (1993)
- "Heels" (1993)
- "Bracelets" (1993)
- "If I Can't Sell It" (1993)
- "Kiss" / "All My Misery" (1995)
- "Outta My House" (1998)
- "Brand New Day" (2005)

== Television and film ==
- Cabaret U-Mano – Soundtrack composer (2002)
- Slap Her, She's French – Soundtrack composer (2002)
- G String Divas – Soundtrack Composer (2000)
- Men In Shorts 2 – Herself (2000)
- La Cage aux Zombies – Soundtrack composer (1995)
- HBO's Real Sex – Soundtrack composer (1994)
- Sex Is... – Soundtrack composer (1993)
