= Gallinger Municipal Hospital Psychopathic Ward =

Building in Washington, D.C.

- U.S. National Register of Historic Places
- U.S. Historic district
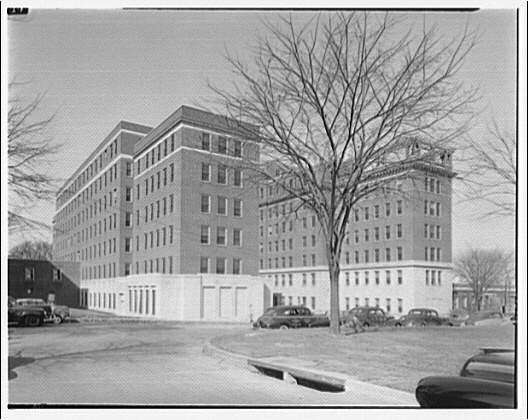
- Gallinger Municipal Hospital Psychopathic Ward in 1949

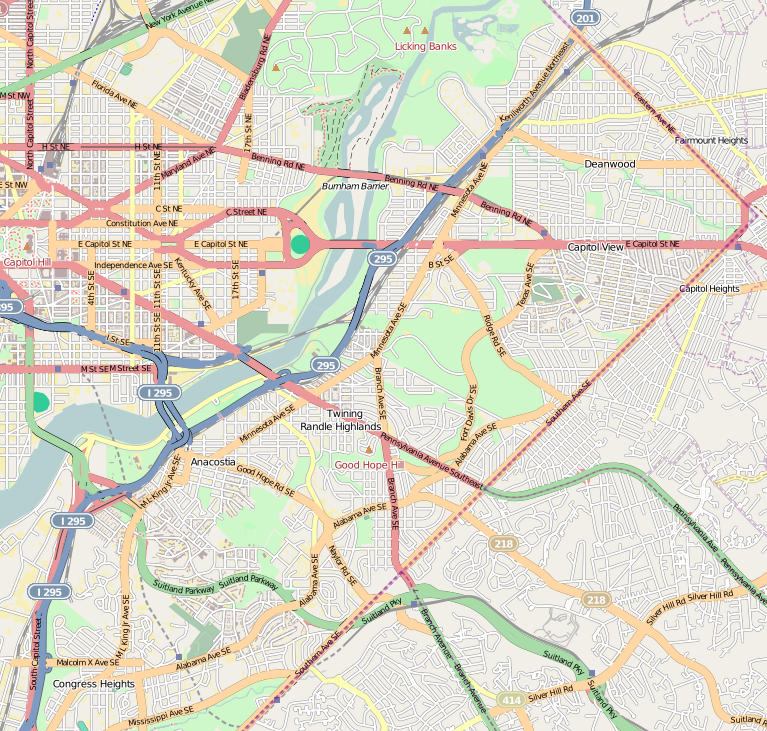
- Location within Washington, D.C. Location within the District of Columbia Location within the United States
- Location: Reservation 13, 19th St. and Massachusetts Ave., SE, Washington, District of Columbia
- Coordinates: 38°53′4″N 76°58′37″W
- Area: 3 acres (1.2 ha)
- Built: 1920
- Built by: George E. Wynne
- Architect: Snowden Ashford
- Architectural style: Colonial Revival
- NRHP reference No.: 89000074
- Added to NRHP: February 27, 1989

The Gallinger Municipal Hospital Psychopathic Ward consisted of three hospital buildings in the Hill East neighborhood of Washington, D.C., U.S.

== History ==
These buildings were built in 1920–1923 to the Colonial Revival design of Washington architect Snowden Ashford. Local contractor George H. Wynne constructed the buildings for $766,200. By 1924 it had been featured in the journal Modern Hospital and was also described in 1928 in the standard text The American Hospital of the Twentieth Century.

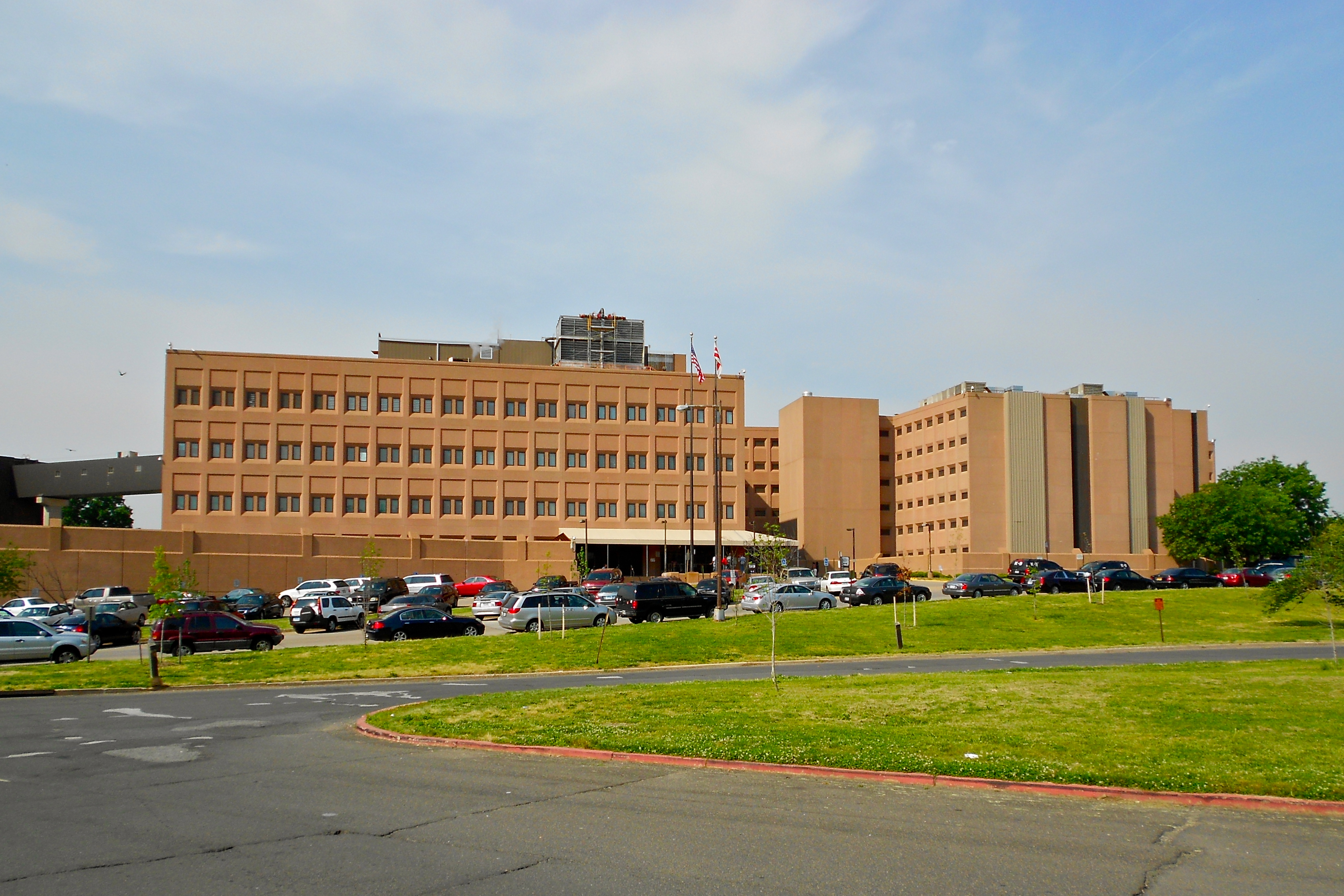
Prison built on the site.

The hospital was named for Senator Jacob Harold Gallinger of New Hampshire, who sponsored the bill for its construction in the Senate.

It was renamed D.C. General Hospital in 1953, and closed in 2001.

Construction of a prison on the site was planned in 1986, with preservationists contesting the plan until 1989. The buildings were listed on the National Register of Historic Places in February, 1989 and were demolished c. 1990.

== See also ==
- District of Columbia General Hospital – Former hospital in Washington, D.C.
