= Frau Wäber =

German drag queen

Frau Wäber (Mrs Wäber) is a popular and long-running drag act on German television, who appears in a number of light entertainment, Schlager and Volksmusik programmes on the state channel SWR, and on SWR-produced programmes of the same type in ARD. The character is played by Hansy Vogt, who also presents programmes as himself, and sometimes appears both as himself and Frau Wäber in the same programme. Vogt is also lead singer of the Schlager party band Die Feldberger, and in addition performs as a ventriloquist.

Frau Martha Wäber is a comic stereotype of a confused, elderly Swabian lady, and speaks in a strong, comical, Black Forest dialect. Typically, she appears in sketches and games, tells corny jokes, and performs scripted banter with minor German celebrities and Schlager singers. The programmes in which she appears are generally designed to appeal to the elderly (a large proportion of German viewers) and the humour is gentle. The character thus cannot be compared with more contemporary and risqué drag queens such as Lily Savage or RuPaul, and is more similar in tone to the cross-dressing exploits of The Two Ronnies or Stanley Baxter in classic light entertainment programmes of the past.

She has co-presented the SWR show Fröhlicher Alltag since 1998, and also frequently appears in other programmes such as Fröhlicher Weinberg (SWR) and Immer Wieder Sonntags (ARD).
