= Killer (drag performer) =

American drag performer

- Born: Ryan Heath Rorie; August 28, 1976; Bull Shoals, Arkansas, U.S.
- Died: September 5, 2014 (aged 38); Los Angeles, California, U.S.
- Occupation: Drag performer

Ryan Heath Rorie (August 28, 1976 – September 5, 2014) known professionally as Killer, was an American drag performer known for her old Hollywood glamour, clever concepts, and razor-sharp lip syncs with Lypsinka-inspired swagger.

== Career ==
Killer was a regular performer at Trannyshack, Bears in Space, and Dragula (where he won the Miss Dragula contest in July 2014). Queerty interviewed several drag performers who knew Killer and praised him for his unique performance which "did not conform" to expectations, yet remained "classy," according to Cupcake Canne.
