= Tal Kalay =

Israeli entertainer

- טל קלאי
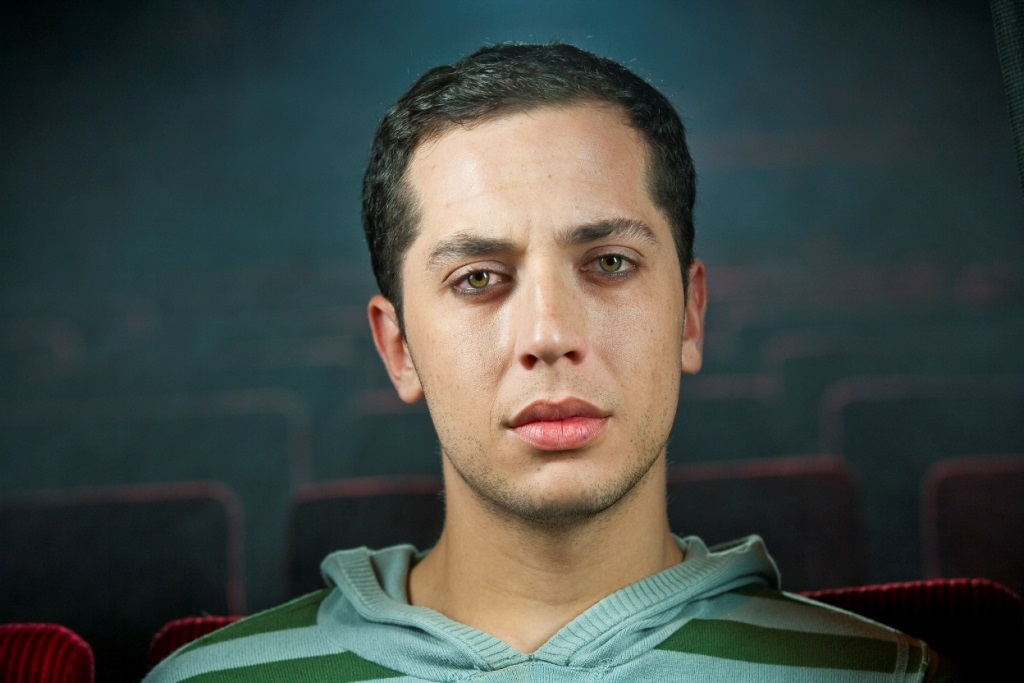
- Kalay in 2013
- Born: 8 August 1984 (age 41); Jerusalem, Israel
- Other names: Tal Kallai; Tal Kalai; Talula Bonet
- Occupations: Actor; comedian; drag queen
- Years active: 2007–present

Tal Kalay (Hebrew: טל קלאי; born 8 August 1984) is an Israeli actor, comedian and drag queen, who is from Jerusalem.
