= Ford and Sheen =

Drag duo (1930s-1970s)

Ford and Sheen were a British double act of drag artists, popular in variety shows and pantomimes between the 1930s and 1970s. They were Vic Ford (born George William Spinks, 1907–1986) and Chris Sheen (born Christopher Shinfield, 1908–1983).

Ford was born in London, and began performing in the 1920s as tramp comedian Wee Georgie Spinks. Sheen was born in Tibshelf, Derbyshire, and began his career as a member of Joe Boganny's slapstick comedy troupe, first appearing on stage in 1933 and then in London in 1935. They met when Sheen joined the cast of the all-male revue Splinters, and in 1936 the pair decided to team up as female impersonators in variety shows.

They quickly became successful as glamorous drag queens. According to writer Roy Busby, "their rather old-fashioned cross-talk act, perfectly timed and polished by constant repetition, [contrasted with] the brasher style of modern drag acts. In the old tradition, they [took] their bow at the finale as well-groomed males." They toured widely during the Second World War, and the years following, with shows such as "Showboat Express", "Forces in Skirts", and "Misleading Ladies", in which Danny La Rue had his first speaking part. In 1949, they appeared with Hal Monty and Max Bygraves in the film Skimpy in the Navy, and are credited with being the first female impersonators (apart from Arthur Lucan as "Old Mother Riley") to feature in a full-length film.

Over the years they became best known for appearing in pantomimes as "ugly sisters", which they continued to do until the 1970s.
