= Punani (drag queen) =

French drag performer

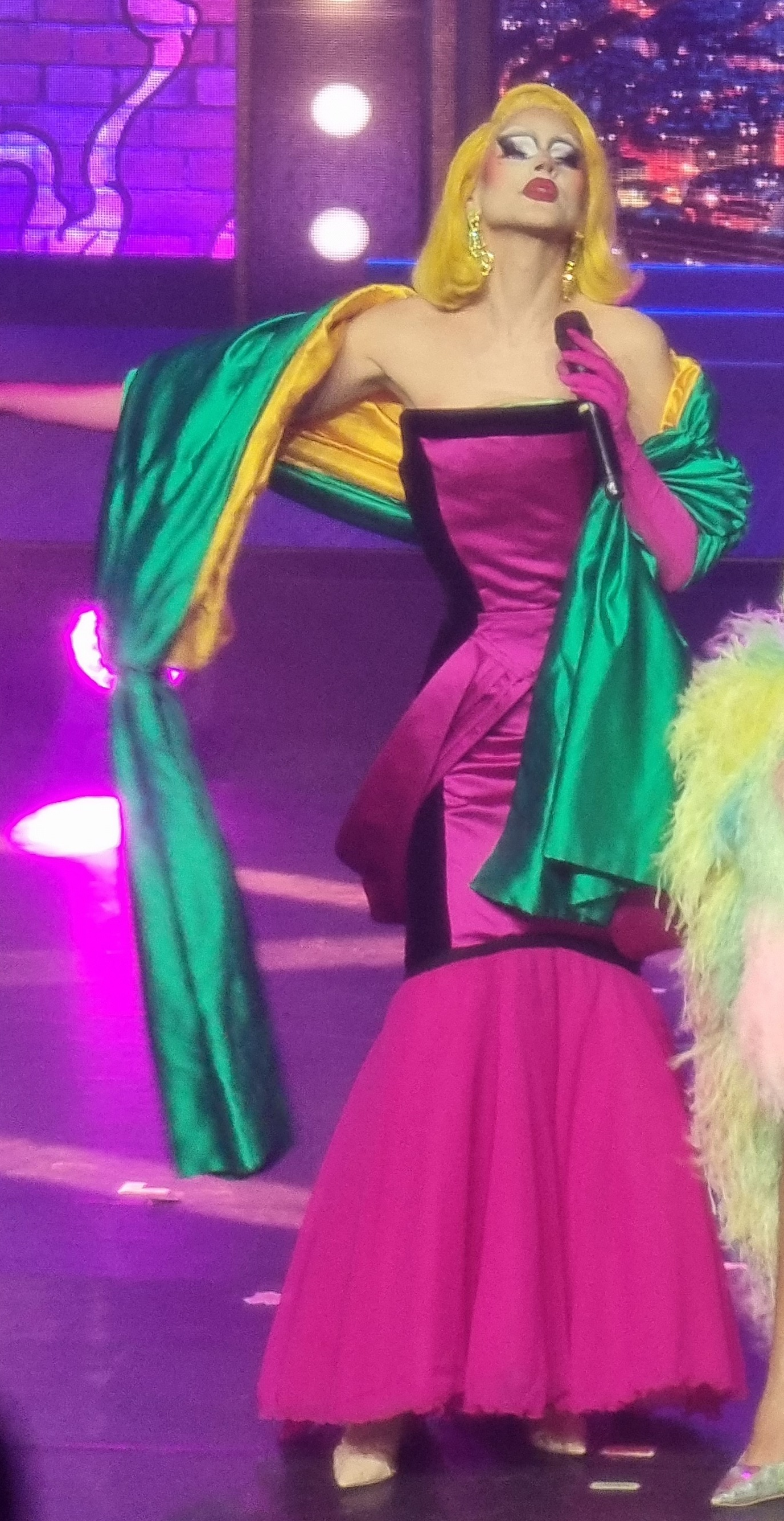
- Punani in 2023
- Born: Jules Faure
- Occupation: Drag queen
- Television: Drag Race France (season 2)

Punani is the stage name of Jules Faure, a French drag performer who competed on season 2 of Drag Race France and season 1 of Drag Race France All Stars. She also sang and composed La Punanimité.

== Career ==
Punani began doing drag in 2013, alongside her best friend from childhood, Rose. The duo became known as Rose and Punani. Both competed as individuals on season 2 of Drag Race France. Punani impersonated Amanda Lear for the Snatch Game challenge, and placed in the top four.

== Personal life ==
Punani is based in Paris.

== Filmography ==
=== Television ===
- Drag Race France (season 2)
- Drag Race France All Stars (2025)
