= Wanda Wisdom =

American drag queen and podcaster

The Progrum
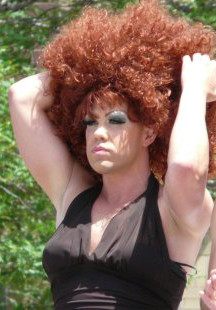
- Wanda Wisdom in 2008

Presentation
- Hosted by: Wanda Wisdom
- Genre: Comedy
- Updates: Semi - daily

Publication
- Original release: 2005 – 2012

Wanda Wisdom is the female impersonation persona of Bradley Traynor (born April 23, 1975 in California). She is a drag queen entertainer and a podcaster from Minneapolis, Minnesota.

== Career ==
Wisdom used to host semi-daily podcast show called "The Progrum" (previously known as "Lucky Bitch Radio"). Her "male alter ego," Bradley Traynor, hosted a separate daily podcast, "Big Gay News," dedicated to LGBT related news, but his role as host of Big Gay News has since been succeeded by Pierre Tardif.

Wisdom holds the title of the world's first podcasting drag queen Wanda has interviewed many celebrities on her show including Mary Tyler Moore, Lady Bunny, BeBe Zahara Benet, Miss Coco Peru, and Adam Carmichael.

Wisdom is also featured in Minneapolis LGBT magazine Lavender Media.

She occasionally co-hosted a radio and TV spot with Jason Matheson on KMSP Fox 9, WFTC-TV My29 and KTMY MyTalk 107.1, which led to Bradley Traynor going full-time on the Colleen & Bradley show. This marked a transition from Lavender Media who had previously hosted The Progrum, and the final Lavender Media hosted episode of "The Progrum" was podcast on 3 April 2012. Since then wandawisdom.com has been taken offline, but there have been recent hints on Wanda's Facebook timeline that the program may make a return.
