= Shawn Hitchins =

Canadian comedian, author and actor

- Born: June 4, 1980 (age 46)
- Children: 1
- Website: shawnhitchins.com

Shawn Hitchins is a gay Toronto-based comedian, author, and actor. He is known for his red hair and for sharing his experience as a sperm donor to a lesbian couple.

== Early life ==
Hitchins was born in Egypt, Ontario. In 2000, Hitchins briefly attended an acting program at George Brown College.

== Career ==
In 2005, Hitchins spent a summer performing in with the drag trio The B-Girlz in Provincetown, Massachusetts.

In 2010, Hitchins appeared as a panelist on MTV (Canada) 1 Girl 5 Gays.

In 2011, Hitchins debuted his first one-man show called Survival of the Fiercest at the Edinburgh Fringe Festival where he made an offhand joke about the need for redheads to have a "Ginger Pride Walk." In 2013, he returned to the UK to host the Ginger Pride Walk in Edinburgh, Scotland which gained international media attention on BBC News, The Guardian, CNN, Raidió Teilifís Éireann, The Globe and Mail.

In 2013, Hitchins debut his second one-man show called Ginger Nation at the Edinburgh Festival Fringe. The show recounts Hitchins' experience donating sperm to a lesbian couple as well as memories from adolescence, brushes with celebrity, and pride in his ginger hair. It received unprecedented media coverage for the festival and the show was later brought to Canada, the United States. In 2015, Ginger Nation received top hit at the 25th Atlantic Fringe Festival. In 2016, Hitchins adapted the live show into a concert film, which screened at the 2017 InsideOut Film and Video Festival, the 2017 Cucalorus Film Festival, and the 2018 SF Indiefest. Huffington Post described the film as "vastly entertaining."

In 2017, Hitchins released his debut memoir A Brief History of Oversharing, published by ECW Press.

== Personal life ==
In 2012, Hitchins welcomed a daughter after becoming a sperm donor for two close lesbian friends.

== Books ==
- Hitchins, Shawn (2017). A Brief History of Oversharing: One Ginger's Anthology of Humiliation. ECW Press. ISBN 978-1770413269. (Humor)
- Hitchins, Shawn (2021). The Light Streamed Beneath It: A Memoir of Grief and Celebration. ECW Press. (Memoir)

== Filmography ==
=== Documentary ===
- 2016: Shawn Hitchins: Ginger Nation - also writer, producer, collaborating director

=== Films ===
- 2010: The Con Artist - Metrosexual

=== Television ===
==== TV Mini-Series ====
- 2008: The Trojan Horse - Bellboy

==== TV Series ====
- 2009-2010: 1 Girl 5 Gays - Himself
- 2004: Wild Card - The FedEd Guy
