= Morfina (drag queen) =

Spanish drag performer

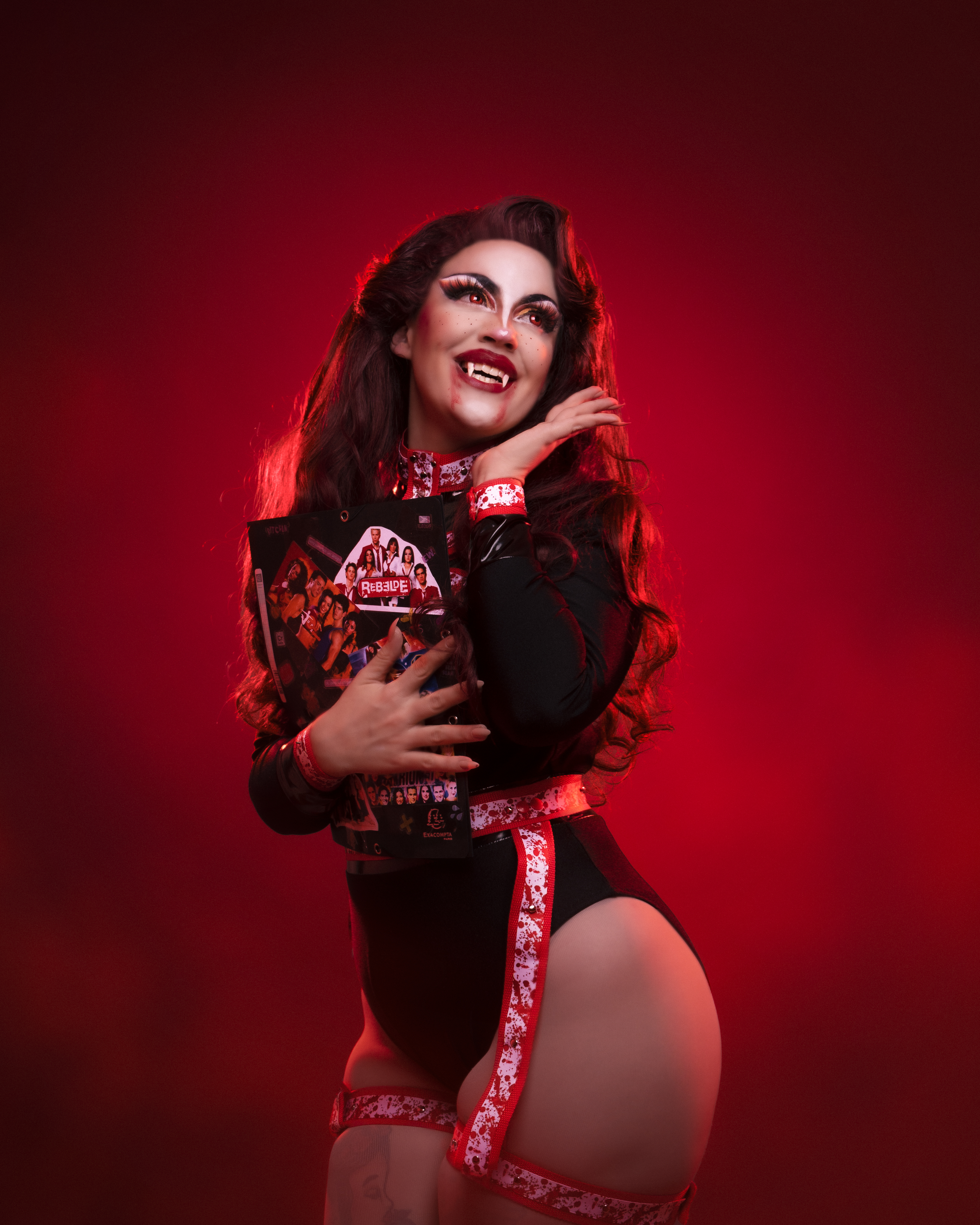

Morfina is a Spanish drag queen. She competed in the first season of Regias del Drag España.
