= The Boulet Brothers' Dragula: Titans season 2 =

2025 American television show

The Boulet Brothers' Dragula: Titans
- Season 2
- Promotional poster for season two
- Hosted by: The Boulet Brothers
- Judges: Dracmorda Boulet; Swanthula Boulet
- No. of contestants: 14
- Winner: Evah Destruction
- Runners-up: Abhora; Jaharia; Jay Kay
- No. of episodes: 10

Release
- Original network: AMC+/Shudder (United States)
- Original release: 7 October – 9 December 2025

Season chronology
- ← Previous; Season 1

The second season of The Boulet Brothers' Dragula: Titans premiered on October 7, 2025, on AMC+ and Shudder. It features fourteen past contestants from the original series, returning to compete for the title of "Queen of the Underworld".

== Production ==
A second season of Titans was confirmed by Shudder on April 23, 2025 along with the seventh season of The Boulet Brothers' Dragula.

The cast was officially revealed on September 16, 2025, during a YouTube livestream broadcast on the Boulet Brothers' official channel. The prizes of this edition include a $100,000 grand prize, a headlining spot on a forthcoming 2026 Dragula World Tour and the title of "Queen of the Underworld".

== Contestants ==
Contestants of The Boulet Brothers' Dragula: Titans season 2 and their backgrounds
Contestant	Age	Hometown	Original season(s)	Original placement(s)	Outcome
Evah Destruction	33	Austin, Texas	Season 3	5th place	Winner
Evah Destruction	33	Austin, Texas	Titans 1	4th place	Winner
Abhora	35	Los Angeles, California	Season 2	4th place	Runners-up (Note: Jaharia originally placed fourth, but re-entered the competition after winning the last round of the Hellbound Showdown.)
Abhora	35	Los Angeles, California	Titans 1	7th place (Note: Abhora originally placed tenth, but re-entered the competition and ultimately placed seventh.)	Runners-up
Jaharia	29	Kansas City, Missouri	Season 6	6th place	Runners-up
Jay Kay	30	New York City, New York	Season 5	7th place (Note: Jay Kay originally placed eleventh, but re-entered the competition and ultimately placed seventh.)	Runners-up
Cynthia Doll	32	Kansas City, Missouri	Season 5	6th place (Note: Cynthia Doll appeared as the Exorsister for season six.)	5th place
Sigourney Beaver	32	Chicago, Illinois	Season 4	Runner-up	6th place
Blackberri	35	Houston, Texas	Season 5	Runner-up	7th place
Disasterina	55	Los Angeles, California	Season 2	5th place	8th place
Priscilla Chambers	29	Asheville, North Carolina	Season 3	Runner-up	8th place
Priscilla Chambers	29	Asheville, North Carolina	Resurrection	4th place	8th place
Dollya Black	29	Orlando, Florida	Season 3	Runner-up	10th place
La Zavaleta	28	Mexico City, Mexico	Season 4	5th place	Disqualified (Note: La Zavaleta was disqualified from the competition after participating in the extermination challenge.)
Jade Jolie	38	Gainesville, Florida	Season 4	6th place	Disqualified (Note: Jade Jolie was disqualified from the competition after being exterminated and participating in two rounds of the Hellbound Showdown.)
Loris (Note: Loris Volkle is referred to as Loris on the show.)	30	Los Angeles, California	Season 1	5th place	13th place
Loris	30	Los Angeles, California	Resurrection	4th place	13th place
Frankie Doom	40	Anchorage, Alaska	Season 1	Runner-up	14th place
Frankie Doom	40	Anchorage, Alaska	Resurrection	4th place	14th place

== Contestant progress ==
Legend:

Evah Destruction won The Boulet Brothers' Dragula Titans season 2.
Abhora, Jaharia and Jay Kay were the runners-up.
RTRN (Return) indicates that Jaharia won the Hellbound Showdown and returned to the competition for the finale.
WIN indicates that the contestant won the challenge.
SAFE indicates that the contestant was declared safe by the judges.
IMM (Immunity) indicates that Jay Kay obtained a scroll with the power of granting for themself or a fellow contestant immunity from the extermination, choosing themself.
BTM (Bottom) indicates that the contestant was up for extermination.
EXT (Exterminated) indicates that the contestant was exterminated.
DISQ (Disqualified) indicates that La Zavaleta and Jade Jolie were disqualified by the judges and were unable to participate in the Hellbound Showdown.

Contestants progress with placements in each episode
Contestant	Episode									
Contestant	1 (Note: Abhora was cursed by the Fright Feat winner Dollya Black and put up for extermination.)	2	3 (Note: Jade Jolie was initially exterminated in episode 3 and was later disqualified after participating in two rounds of the Hellbound Showdown.)	4	5	6	7 (Note: Evah Destruction won the challenge and gained the power of the "Sonic Transducer" to exterminate a fellow competitor, choosing Sigourney Beaver.)	8	9	10
Evah Destruction	WIN	SAFE	SAFE	SAFE	SAFE	SAFE	WIN	WIN	Guest	Winner
Abhora	BTM	SAFE	SAFE	BTM	WIN	WIN	SAFE	BTM	Guest	Runner-up
Jaharia	SAFE	WIN	SAFE	BTM	SAFE	SAFE	SAFE	EXT	RTRN	Runner-up
Jay Kay	SAFE	SAFE	WIN	IMM	SAFE	SAFE	SAFE	BTM	Guest	Runner-up
Cynthia Doll	BTM	SAFE	SAFE	SAFE	SAFE	BTM	SAFE	EXT	Guest	
Sigourney Beaver	SAFE	SAFE	SAFE	SAFE	SAFE	WIN	EXT		Guest	
Blackberri	SAFE	SAFE	SAFE	WIN	SAFE	EXT			Guest	
Disasterina	SAFE	SAFE	BTM	SAFE	EXT				Guest	
Priscilla Chambers	SAFE	SAFE	SAFE	SAFE	EXT				Guest	
Dollya Black	BTM	SAFE	SAFE	EXT					Guest	
La Zavaleta	SAFE	SAFE	SAFE	DISQ						
Jade Jolie	SAFE	BTM	DISQ							
Loris	SAFE	EXT							Guest	
Frankie Doom	EXT								Guest	

== Exterminations ==
Legend:

The contestant was exterminated after their first time in the bottom.
The contestant was exterminated after their second time in the bottom.
The contestant was exterminated after their third time in the bottom.
The contestant was disqualified from the competition.

Episode	Bottom Titans			Challenge	Exterminated
1	Abhora vs. Cynthia Doll vs. Dollya Black vs. Frankie Doom			Hike to the Bridge to Nowhere and bungee jump off	Frankie Doom
2	Jade Jolie	vs.	Loris	None (Ghostly Gallows)	Loris
3	Disasterina	vs.	Jade Jolie	None (Ghostly Gallows)	Jade Jolie
4	Abhora vs. Dollya Black vs. Jaharia vs. La Zavaleta			Eat a vampire picnic of blood, raw blood, and innards	Dollya Black
4	Abhora vs. Dollya Black vs. Jaharia vs. La Zavaleta			Eat a vampire picnic of blood, raw blood, and innards	La Zavaleta
5	Disasterina	vs.	Priscilla Chambers	None (Ghostly Gallows)	Disasterina
5	Disasterina	vs.	Priscilla Chambers	None (Ghostly Gallows)	Priscilla Chambers
6	Blackberri	vs.	Cynthia Doll	Lie in coffins filled with snakes	Blackberri
7	Abhora vs. Cynthia Doll vs. Jaharia vs. Jay Kay vs. Sigourney Beaver			None (Sonic Transducer)	Sigourney Beaver
8	Jay Kay	vs.	Cynthia Doll	None (Ghostly Gallows)	Cynthia Doll
8	Abhora	vs.	Jaharia	None (Ghostly Gallows)	Jaharia

== Hellbound Showdown ==
Legend:

The contestant won the Hellbound Showdown and advanced to the next one.
The contestant won the Hellbound Showdown but was later disqualified from the competition.
The contestant won the final Hellbound Showdown and re-entered the competition.

Episode	Eliminated Titans			Challenge	Winner
3	Frankie Doom	vs.	Loris	Design and present a gothic bride look and gothic groom look	Loris
4	Jade Jolie	vs.	Loris	Present a Nosferatu beach look and lip sync to "Nosferatu Beach Party" by the Boulet Brothers.	Jade Jolie
5	Dollya Black	vs.	Jade Jolie	Present filthy holiday themed look and perform a live act of filth.	Jade Jolie
6	Disasterina	vs.	Priscilla Chambers	Perform in a lip sync against one another to "I'm Wicked" by Twin Temple	Priscilla Chambers
7	Blackberri	vs.	Priscilla Chambers	Present an original look inspired by The Rocky Horror Picture Show	Blackberri
8	Blackberri	vs.	Sigourney Beaver	Conceptualize and showcase a look embodying a comic book supervillain with a signature power	Sigourney Beaver
9	Cynthia Doll vs. Jaharia vs. Sigourney Beaver			Perform in a three-way lip sync battle to "Time to Die" by the Boulet Brothers	Jaharia

Hellbound Showdown progress
Contestant	Episode						
Contestant	3	4	5	6	7	8	9
Jaharia	—N/a						WIN
Cynthia Doll	—N/a						ELIM
Sigourney Beaver	—N/a					WIN	ELIM
Blackberri	—N/a				WIN	ELIM	
Priscilla Chambers	—N/a			WIN	ELIM		
Disasterina	—N/a			ELIM			
Jade Jolie	—N/a	WIN	WIN	DISQ			
Dollya Black	—N/a		ELIM				
Loris	WIN	ELIM					
Frankie Doom	ELIM						

== Guest judges ==
Episode	Guest judges
1	David Dastmalchian, actor Victoria Elizabeth Black, winner of The Boulet Brothers' Dragula: Titans season 1
2	Ryan Turek, film executive and producer Kate Siegel, actress and writer
3	James A. Janisse, youtuber and internet personality Chelsea Rebecca, youtuber and internet personality
4	Akela Cooper, screenwriter and television producer Bonnie Aarons, actress
5	Jennifer Tilly, actress Don Mancini, screenwriter, director and producer
6	Twin Temple, Satanic doo-wop band
7	Peaches Christ , underground drag performer, emcee, filmmaker, and actor Darren Stein, filmmaker
8	Todd McFarlane, comic book creator and entrepreneur Steve Orlando, comic book writer

== Episodes ==
Episode	Title	Original airdate	Episode summary
1	Halloween House Party Party Part II	October 7, 2025	Fright Feat Challenge: Pull pins at random out of a voodoo crucifix, one of which has a red tip instead of a black tip Fright Feat Prize: Put another contestant up for extermination Fright Feat Winner: Dollya Black; Chosen Contestant: Abhora Floor Show Challenge: Recreate an iconic Halloween costume and, in teams, perform a lip-sync to the Boulet Brother's song, "All Hallows' Eve": Abhora chose a Scarecrow; Blackberri chose a Mummy; Cynthia Doll chose a Vampire; Disasterina chose a Sorceress; Dollya Black chose the One-Eyed, One-Horned Purple People Eater; Evah Destruction chose the Grim Reaper; Frankie Doom, Jay Kay and Priscilla Chambers chose a Werewolf; Jade Jolie chose the Wicked Witch of the West; Jaharia chose a Black Widow spider; La Zavaleta chose a Ghost; Loris chose a Skeleton; Sigourney Beaver chose the Devil; Teams: Abhora, Disasterina, Frankie Doom and Loris; Dollya Black, Jade Jolie and Priscilla Chambers; Blackberri, Cynthia Doll, Jaharia and Jay Kay; Evah Destruction, La Zavaleta and Sigourney Beaver; Floor Show Winner: Evah Destruction Extermination Challenge: Each team must vote for who they consider to be their weakest link to be put up for extermination, one of which will be saved by the Boulets. The chosen contestants, alongside the one chosen in the Fright Feat, must hike 5 miles at night to the Bridge to Nowhere and bungee jump off Votes: Abhora and Disasterina voted for Frankie Doom, Frankie Doom voted for Loris, Loris voted for Disasterina; Dollya Black voted for Jade Jolie, Jade Jolie and Priscilla Chambers voted for Dollya Black; Blackberri, Jaharia and Jay Kay voted for Cynthia Doll, Cynthia Doll voted for Jay Kay; Evah Destruction and La Zavaleta voted for Sigourney Beaver, Sigourney Beaver voted for La Zavaleta. Sigourney Beaver is saved by the Boulets.; Participants: Abhora, Cynthia Doll, Dollya Black and Frankie Doom; Exterminated: Frankie Doom
2	The Monsters of Rock: Cyberpussy	October 14, 2025	Floor Show Challenge: Perform in rock bands at sci-fi cyberpunk festival Neotropolis with a matching Cyberpunk Monsters of Rock outfit Bands: Mech Fucks: Abhora, Blackberri, Disasterina, Jade Jolie and Sigourney Beaver; Skin Tag: Cynthia Doll, Jay Kay, La Zavaleta and Priscilla Chambers; Plated Steel: Dollya Black, Evah Destruction, Jaharia and Loris; Floor Show Winner: Jaharia Extermination Challenge: None (Ghostly Gallows); Participants: Jade Jolie and Loris; Exterminated: Loris
3	A Gothic Wedding	October 21, 2025	Fright Feat Challenge: Be the fastest to eat a slice of retched wedding cake with your hands tied behind your back Fright Feat Prize: Curse another contestant with the "Curse of Rain on Your Wedding Day", forcing them to be drenched in water before coming out on stage Fright Feat Winner: Jaharia; Cursed Contestant: Sigourney Beaver Floor Show Challenge: Present both a gothic bride and a gothic groom looks Floor Show Winner: Jay Kay Extermination Challenge: None (Ghostly Gallows); Participants: Disasterina and Jade Jolie; Exterminated: Jade Jolie Hellbound Showdown Participants: Frankie Doom and Loris; Hellbound Showdown Winner: Loris
4	Return to the Nosferatu Beach Party	October 28, 2025	Fright Feat Challenge: Be the fastest to eat a bulb of garlic and wash it down with a glass of pig's blood Fright Feat Prize: A "Shield Spell" to save themselves or another contestant from extermination, and assigning the teams for the challenge Fright Feat Winner: Jay Kay; Saved Contestant: Jay Kay Floor Show Challenge: Present a Vampire beach look and, in teams, perform a lip-sync to the Boulet Brother's song "Nosferatu Beach Party" Teams: Abhora, Dollya Black and Sigourney Beaver; Blackberri and Jay Kay; Disasterina, Jaharia and La Zavaleta; Evah Destruction, Cynthia Doll and Priscilla Chambers; Floor Show Winner: Blackberri Extermination Challenge: Eat a vampire picnic of blood, raw blood, and innards Participants: Abhora, Dollya Black, Jaharia, and La Zavaleta; Exterminated: Dollya Black; Disqualified: La Zavaleta Hellbound Showdown Participants: Jade Jolie and Loris; Hellbound Showdown Winner: Jade Jolie
5	Holiday of Horrors	November 4, 2025	Floor Show Challenge: Present filthy holiday-themed looks and perform a live act of filth on stage.: Abhora, Disasterina and Jaharia chose Christmas; Blackberri chose Thanksgiving; Cynthia Doll and Evah Destruction chose Valentine's Day; Jay Kay chose Mardi Gras; Priscilla Chambers chose Father's Day; Sigourney Beaver chose Independence Day; Floor Show Winner: Abhora Extermination Challenge: None (Ghostly Gallows); Participants: Disasterina and Priscilla Chambers; Exterminated: Disasterina and Priscilla Chambers Hellbound Showdown Participants: Dollya Black and Jade Jolie; Hellbound Showdown Winner: Jade Jolie
6	The Ghost Town	November 11, 2025	Floor Show Challenge: Present a Wild West ghost look on location at a ghost town and perform a lip-sync to "I'm Wicked" by Twin Temple. Floor Show Winners: Abhora and Sigourney Beaver Extermination Challenge: Spend the longest time in a coffin filled with snakes Participants: Blackberri and Cynthia Doll; Exterminated: Blackberri Disqualified: Jade Jolie; Hellbound Showdown Participants: Disasterina and Priscilla Chambers; Hellbound Showdown Winner: Priscilla Chambers
7	The Boulet Brothers Horror Picture Show	November 18, 2025	Floor Show Challenge: Perform a theater number as a group to an original song inspired by The Rocky Horror Picture Show Floor Show Prize: The ability to eliminate any contestant from the competition (Sonic Transducer) Floor Show Winner: Evah Destruction Exterminated: Sigourney Beaver Hellbound Showdown Participants: Priscilla Chambers and Blackberri; Hellbound Showdown Winner: Blackberri
8	Supervillains!	November 25, 2025	Floor Show Challenge: Conceptualize and showcase a look embodying a comic book supervillain with a signature power Floor Show Winner: Evah Destruction Extermination Challenge: None (Ghostly Gallows); Participants: All remaining contestants Exterminated: Cynthia Doll and Jaharia Hellbound Showdown Participants: Blackberri and Sigourney Beaver; Hellbound Showdown Winner: Sigourney Beaver
9	The Last Supper Reunion	December 2, 2025	The cast reunites to revisit the season. Hellbound Showdown Participants: Sigourney Beaver, Jaharia, and Cynthia Doll; Hellbound Showdown Winner: Jaharia
10	The Grand Finale	December 9, 2025	Floor Show Challenge: Create and showcase four looks representing the Four Horsemen of the Apocalypse. Floor Show Prize: A headlining spot on the upcoming Dragula Titans World Tour, $100,000, the title and crown of the World's Next Drag Supermonster. Winner: Evah Destruction
