= AFAB queen =

Subtype of drag queen

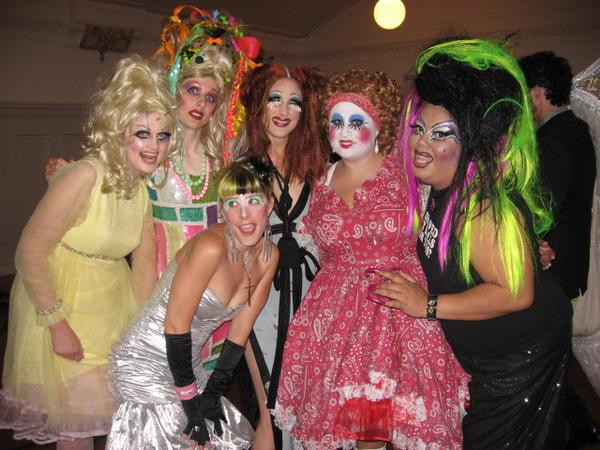
AFAB queens at Trannyshack, 2008

An AFAB queen, diva queen, hyper queen, or bio queen is a drag queen who is a cisgender woman, or any person who was assigned female at birth. These performers are generally indistinguishable from the more common male or transgender female drag queens in artistic style and techniques.

== Terminology ==
"AFAB" stands for "assigned female at birth". While this is somewhat controversial, other terms still used both by performers and in the media are also considered offensive. The term "faux queen" is rejected and considered outdated by many drag artists for implying that female drag queens are not as "real" as male drag queens, and the term "female queen" is considered by many performers to be transphobic as they imply that a transgender woman who performs as a drag queen is not female. Other descriptions include "biologically challenged" drag queen, "female female impersonator", or "female impersonator impersonator." In recent years "AFAB queen" has been adopted to be inclusive of any performer who is discriminated against based on their assigned sex at birth, including non-binary and trans male performers. However, this term is disliked by some trans male performers who believe there should not be any term to distinguish between drag artists on the basis of their gender identity, and who find that being called an AFAB queen means they are mistakenly believed to be women.

== Concept ==
Like all drag performers, female drag queens play with traditional gender roles and gender norms to educate and entertain. Female queens can appear alongside drag kings, transgender drag queens, or male drag queens at drag shows and are interchangeable with other drag queens as emcees, performers, hostesses, and spokesmodels.

For some it can be a way to redefine postmodern feminism; female drag queen Ms. Lucia Love stated, "Drag queens would be nowhere without women." For others it simply is about dressing up and having fun.

In San Francisco, the first ever "faux queen" pageant was produced as a benefit for the drag performer Diet Popstitute. The first title-holder was Coca Dietetica, a.k.a. Laurie Bushman. The Klubstitute Kollective was formed after Diet Popstitute's 1995 death to continue to raise funds and provide a space for the performers who, at the time, were not always welcome in typical drag venues. Pageant organizer Ruby Toosday had "friends who got fired (from drag clubs) for being women...it seemed like we had definitely hit a nerve. Contestants were judged on drag, talent, and personality by a panel of judges and the winner helped "femcee" the following year. The pageants were held from 1996 to 2005. The Faux Queen Pageant was resurrected in 2012 by former title holder Bea Dazzler, and will continue to be a yearly competition in San Francisco.

The dancer and performance artist Fauxnique (Monique Jenkinson) became the first female drag queen to win a major drag pageant—competing against cisgender male or trans female drag queens—when she was crowned Miss Trannyshack 2003. From Bust Magazine: "'(drag) comes down to a sort of self-awareness, a self-consciousness about playing around with femininity,' says Fauxnique. She adds that while drag for her is primarily about performance, it's also a 'rejection of traditional oppressive forms of masculinity—and that's part of an affinity with gay men as well. I wouldn't say every faux queen is a feminist, but I would say that a part of them is in some way.'"

In the 1970s and 1980s, German-born Brazilian female queen Elke Maravilha became a popular TV personality after participating as a judge in the Chacrinha and Silvio Santos talent shows. According to her, "many people think I am a transvestite. When they ask me this, I jokingly reply that I'm a man indeed. And of the most gifted ones".

The comedy films Connie and Carla and Victor/Victoria both center on female drag queens, but the main characters of both films are women who are forced by circumstance to work as drag queens. They keep their gender a secret and impersonate men when off-stage, unlike their real-life counterparts.

In 2019, the Mexican reality competition show La Mas Draga became the first televised drag competition to feature a cisgender woman, Alexis 3XL, who would later go on to win the season. The 2020 US reality TV vogue competition Legendary was the first US reality television show to include women performing and competing as drag queens, including the all-female team representing House of Ninja. The reality competition Dragula featured two performers who were assigned female at birth in their third season, but winner Landon Cider (a cis woman) performs as a drag king and contestant Hollow Eve (a non-binary person) identifies as a drag artist, not specifically a drag queen. Female drag queen Sigourney Beaver competed in season 4, being one of the four finalists. In 2021, the third season of RuPaul's Drag Race UK was the first season in the franchise to feature a queen who was both assigned female at birth and identified as female, Victoria Scone.

Singer-songwriter Kayleigh Rose Amstutz, known professionally as Chappell Roan, performs with an aesthetic and makeup heavily influenced by drag queens, and has described her stage name as a drag persona.

== Controversy ==
Drag queens who were assigned female at birth, regardless of gender identity, are not always permitted or welcomed within drag spaces, which are typically owned and run by gay men. RuPaul, the producer and host of the reality TV competition RuPaul's Drag Race, originally banned female artists from his shows, stating "Drag loses its sense of danger and its sense of irony once it's not men doing it, because at its core it's a social statement and a big f-you to male-dominated culture. So for men to do it, it's really punk rock, because it's a real rejection of masculinity." After significant backlash, RuPaul amended this response in 2019 to state "I've learnt to never say never." Gottmik was the first trans man and drag queen assigned female at birth to compete on RuPaul's Drag Race.

There are widely held beliefs within the community that AFAB drag queens do not face the same challenges as other drag queens, and do not need to use padding, makeup, or tucking to appear feminine. AFAB drag queens typically counter that they use the same makeup techniques to create exaggerated femininity, and many do use padding and corsets to create an extreme body shape. These queens on Instagram often mock this belief that they do not "transform" their bodies by sharing strikingly different images of themselves in and out of drag with the hashtag #wheresthetransformationsis, started by AFAB queen Creme Fatale.

The rejection of AFAB queens is often closely linked to other reports of discrimination and objectification that cis women, transgender men, and non-binary people assigned female at birth face within LGBTQ spaces. These artists frequently report groping and harassment from cis gay men in gay bars and performance spaces, and report less pay and less tips from audiences. Artists also have complained about drag terminology that they state is exclusionary or offensive; non-binary artist Hollow Eve sparked a significant debate in 2019 when an episode of Dragula aired where they spoke out against the term "fishy," used to mean a drag queen who looks like a woman and referring negatively to the smell of a vulva.

The rising prominence of non-male drag queens and increased dialogue around inclusivity has resulted in many drag artists rejecting any distinction based on their gender and calling for drag competitions to remove all gender and assigned sex requirements for contestants.

== AFAB queens in RuPaul's Drag Race ==
The first queen assigned female at birth was transgender man Gottmik, who competed on season 13 of RuPaul's Drag Race, and season 9 of RuPaul's Drag Race All Stars.

The second AFAB queen to compete on a Drag Race franchise was Victoria Scone, who competed on RuPaul's Drag Race UK series 3, and Canada's Drag Race: Canada vs. the World season 1, where they were a finalist.

The third AFAB queen to compete on a Drag Race franchise was Clover Bish, who competed on Drag Race España season 3 where she placed 5th overall, just falling short of the finale.

The fourth AFAB queen to compete was Pandora Nox, who won the first season of Drag Race Germany. She is the first cisgender woman to win any Drag Race franchise.

AFAB queen and drag king Velma Jones is the fifth to compete, doing so on the sixth season of Canada's Drag Race.

The sixth AFAB queen to compete is Malawitte, who will perform in Drag Race France season 4. In her introduction video, she states "Yes, drag is not just about gender transformation".
