= Bitch Pudding =

Bitch Pudding may refer to:

- Bitch Pudding, a fictional character in the Robot Chicken television series
- Biqtch Puddin' (born 1991), American drag performer
