= Clark College =

Community college in Vancouver, Washington, U.S.

Coordinates: 45.634°N 122.652°W

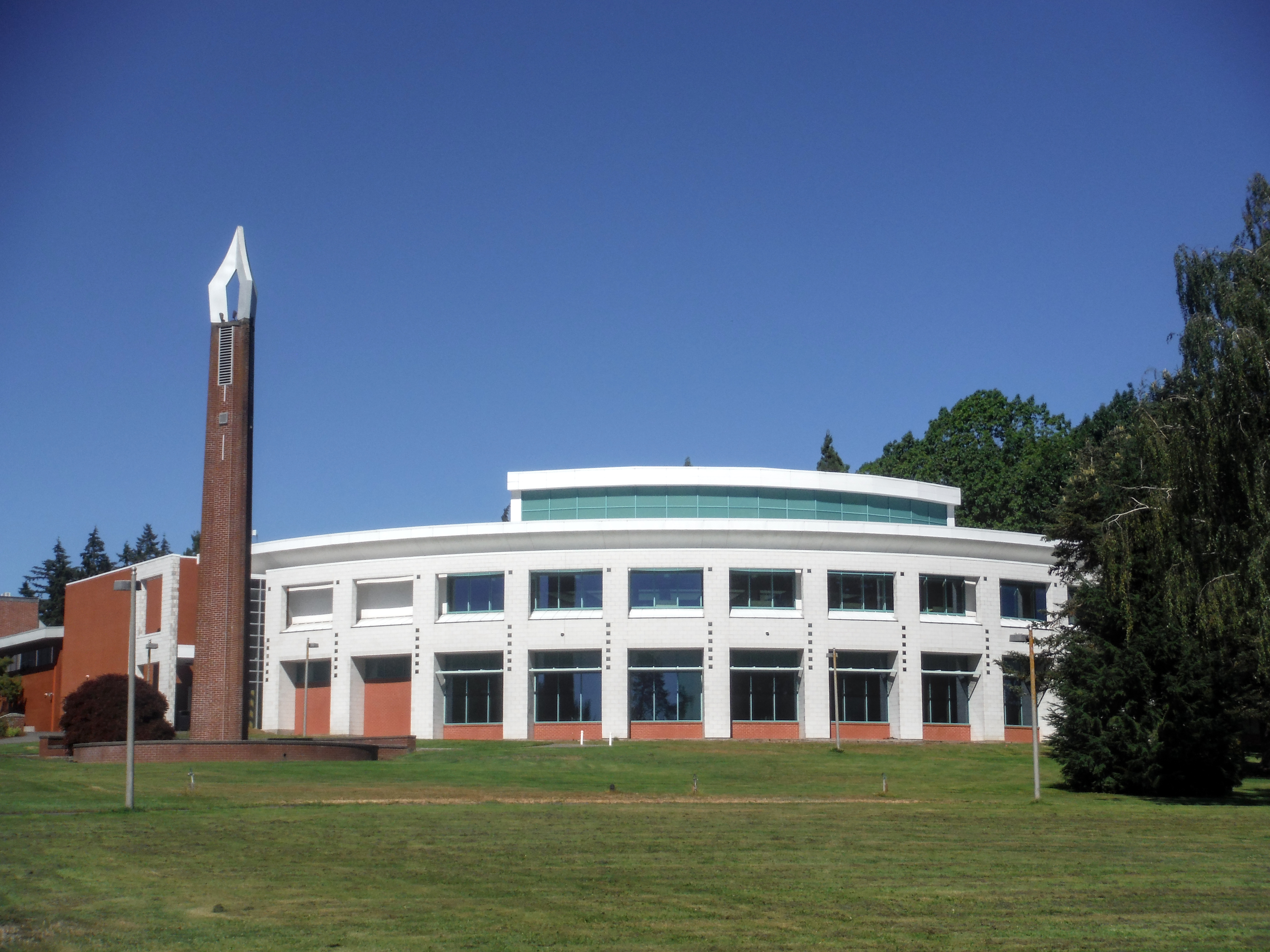
- Chime Tower at Clark College, the Cannell Library in the background
- Former name: Vancouver Junior College
- Type: Public community college
- Established: 1933; 93 years ago
- Endowment: $83.35 million (2025)
- President: Karin Edwards
- Students: 11,500
- Location: Vancouver, Washington, U.S.
- Campus: 101 acres (41 ha)
- Colors: Blue & white
- Nickname: Penguins
- Mascot: Oswald
- Website: www.clark.edu

Clark College is a public community college in Vancouver, Washington. With 11,500 students, Clark College is the largest institution of higher education in southwest Washington. Founded in 1933 as a private junior college, Clark College received its first accreditation in 1937 and has been accredited by the Northwest Commission on Colleges and Universities since 1948. It was incorporated into the statewide community college system in 1967.

== History ==
Originally known as Vancouver Junior College, the college was located at the old Hidden House at 100 W 13th Street in downtown Vancouver from 1933 to 1937, moving several times within the city. The main campus was formerly part of the Vancouver Barracks, which extended from Fourth Plain to the Columbia River but were ceded by the U.S. Army to the city to become Central Park. The college first received state support in 1941, being supervised by the State Board of Education in 1946 with the Vancouver School Board serving as its policy-making body until it was reorganized as a public institution in 1958 and incorporated into the statewide community college system in 1967. In 2014 the college established its first 4-year program, a baccalaureate in the medical field, and became recognized as a 4-year college.

After the Kaiser Shipyards boom of World War II, Clark College rapidly grew to meet the educational needs of the expanded population, the 1944 Serviceman's Readjustment Act and the baby boom. In 1951, the Applied Arts Center became its first building at the current location (its sixth), when the college first offered evening classes. The remaining six buildings on the new campus, including the O'Connell Sports Center, were opened by 1958.

The college briefly drew national attention in 2019 when president Bob Knight retired amid complaints that he discriminated against women, particularly women of color. After his retirement, the college's board of trustees continued investigating the allegations and found them credible. The college's president as of June 2020 was Karin Edwards.

In January 2020, the faculty of the college, represented by the Association for Higher Education, engaged in a three-day strike over employee wages. Part time employee wages were approximately half that of the full time faculty for the same credit load. The strike was resolved when the college agreed to a significant increase in the wages of full-time staff and to a 72 percent pay parity for part-time staff.

Clark College's mascot is a Galapagos penguin named Oswald. He appears at many college events and is acknowledged through the college's Healthy Penguin Nation and Sustainable Penguin Nation initiatives.

== Boschma Farms ==
The Clark College Foundation announced a partnership with Ridgefield East 1 Associates, LLC. The 10 acres is adjacent to the Boschma tract and east end of I-5/SR 501 interchange, thereby serving as a gateway to the north Clark County facility. The Advanced Manufacturing Center, a 48,000 square-foot building projected to be ready for classes beginning Fall term 2025. The Boschma family partnered with the Clark College Foundation to provide 60 acres for the north county location In June 2014.

== Campus ==
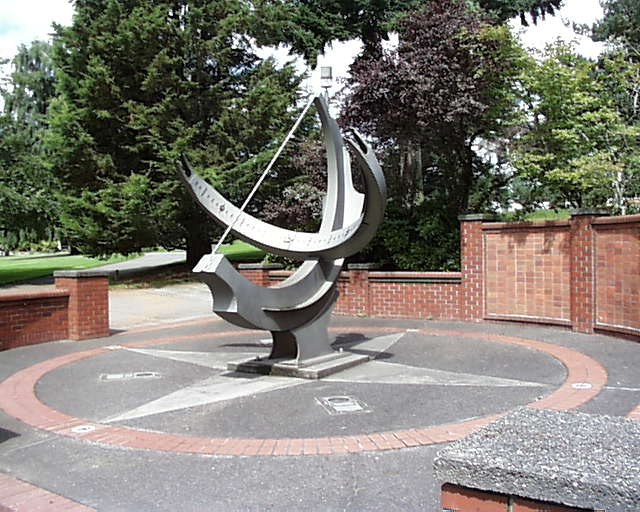
Sun dial near the Anna Pechanec Hall and science buildings.

The college's main campus sits on a 101-acre (0.41 km^{2}) site in Vancouver's Central Park, southwest of Water Works Park and north of Hudson's Bay High School. The college's carillon Chime Tower was designed by Richard Stensrude, begun in 1964, and incorporates materials from the local Hidden Brick Company and the nearby Alcoa plant. The main campus has generally expanded from the southeast northward and other structures include an equatorial bow-style sun dial near the science buildings. As part of the college's 75th anniversary celebration, the sundial was refurbished to provide more accurate time. A new STEM building was completed in the summer of 2016 on the western edge of the main campus, at a cost of $39 million.

In September 2009, the college opened a satellite campus in east Vancouver. The new campus cost $29.5 million, which was $500,000 under the original budget estimates. The campus is certified gold by the Leadership in Energy and Environmental Design (LEED).

The college's first satellite campus opened in the Salmon Creek neighborhood (north Vancouver), and is operated in partnership with Washington State University Vancouver.

== Academics ==
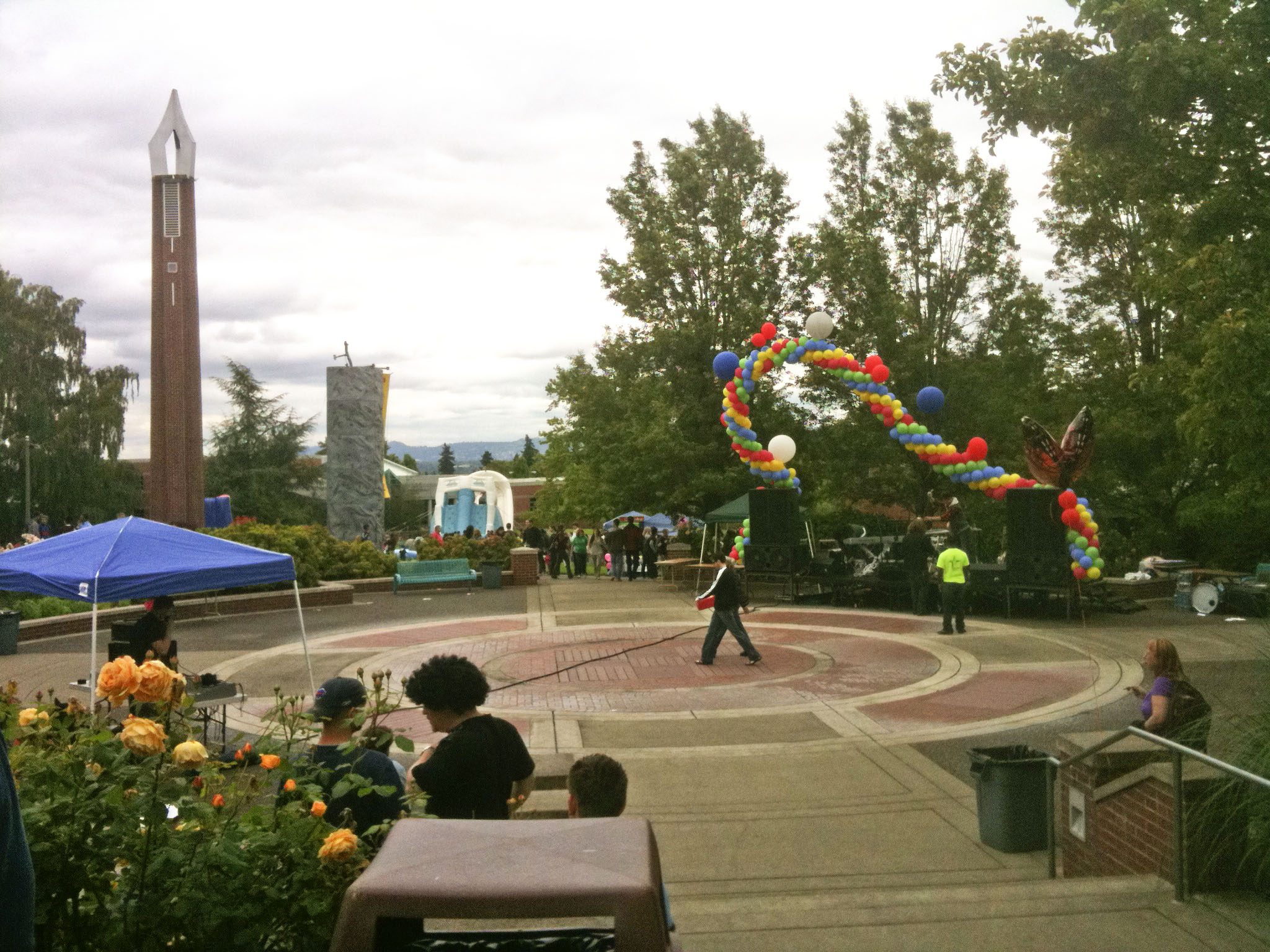
2010 Spring Thing Celebration - an annual end-of-the-academic-year celebration hosted by the ASCC for Clark College students.

Clark College offers more than 100 options for earning a bachelor degree, associate degree, certificate. Additionally, its Transitional Studies program serves adult students seeking to earn their high school diploma or equivalent, learn English as a Second Language, or gain basic skills and job-training programs; courses for transfer to four-year institutions; online courses; and articulations with other colleges that offer students a seamless transfer. Through its Community and Continuing Education program, the college also offers non-credit classes for professional development, personal enrichment, and customized workplace training.

The college hosts one of the largest Running Start programs in the state. This popular Washington state program allows high school students to earn college credit while still in high school. Many Running Start students graduate with both their high school diploma and their associate degree.

The average quarterly enrollments is approximately 9,000 students. 28% of high school students from the region attend Clark College. 42% Clark's student body are first-generation college students; 36% are low-income; and 20% are low-income and first-generation college students. 66% of career and technical student completers were employed or continued their education within nine months. 56% female; 37% students of color; 53% are full-time, and the average age is 27 years-old.

== Athletics ==
Athletic programs at Clark College include men's and women's basketball, coed cross country, men's and women's soccer, coed track, women's softball, women's volleyball and intercollegiate baseball. Clark College is a member of the Northwest Athletic Conference. (NWAC) In January 2012, Clark College established a Hall of Fame to honor students' athletic achievements.

== Notable alumni ==
- Al Bauer - politician
- Asia Consent - drag performer, winner of The Boulet Brothers' Dragula season 6
- Nick Duron (born 1996) - professional baseball player
- Sam Elliott (1965) - actor
- Mike Gaechter - professional football player
- Jess Hartley - novelist and role playing game developer
- Denis Hayes (1964) - environmental activist and coordinator of the first Earth Day
- Ron Larson - mathematician and author
- Tim Leavitt - politician
- Randy Myers - professional baseball player
- Bill Swain - professional football player
- Treva Throneberry
