= Blackberri (drag queen) =

American drag entertainer

- Born: Darius Vallier; 1989 or 1990 (age 35–36); Houston, Texas, U.S.
- Occupation: Drag performer
- Years active: 2016–
- Known for: The Boulet Brothers' Dragula (season 5) - Runner-Up; The Boulet Brothers' Dragula: Titans (season 2) - 7th Place

Blackberri is the stage name of Darius Vallier, an American drag performer who competed on the fifth season of The Boulet Brothers' Dragula as well as the second season of The Boulet Brothers' Dragula: Titans. She was born and continues to live in Houston. Blackberri is nicknamed "The Bearded Beauty of Texas".

== Early life and career ==
Darius Vallier was born in Houston, Texas and raised in Lake Charles, Louisiana. He attended theatre school in Louisiana before moving back to Houston in 2010, where he studied fashion design at the Art Institute of Houston.

Vallier began performing as Blackberri on August 31, 2016. Her stage name is derived from her race, African American, and the LGBTQ+ slang term "bear", meaning someone who has a large build and body hair. The name is additionally a nod to the fruit of the same name, and the fact that gay men may be referred to as "fruity". She was inspired to try drag after assisting a friend of hers, who performed as a drag queen, by fixing and sewing costumes for her. Her first appearances in drag were spent participating in local competition Dessie's Drag Race, which she won.

In 2018, Blackberri began hosting drag queen story time at the Houston Public Library. In February 2021, she was featured in Facebook's Super Bowl commercial, and appeared on the cover of OutSmart Magazine the following June. She was the first official emcee for non-profit organization Bunnies on the Bayou. In 2023, Blackberri was featured in a campaign for Lizzo's shapewear brand Yitty. She has additionally received ABOUT Magazine's FACE Award for "Drag Illusionist of the Year" as well as OutSmart Magazine's "Best Host & Emcee" award.

== Personal life ==
Blackberri uses she/her pronouns and he/him pronouns out of drag. Prior to performing as Blackberri, she worked as a bartender at a comedy club. She has named her influences to be cartoons, anime, films such as Ginger Snaps, Jennifer's Body, Creature from the Black Lagoon and Bride of Frankenstein, artists Bruce Timm, Hajime Sorayama and Alberto Vargas, fellow drag performer Bob the Drag Queen, model Betty Page, and musicians Doja Cat, Megan Thee Stallion, Lizzo, Anita Baker, Chaka Khan and Whitney Houston.

== See also ==
- List of drag queens
- List of people from Houston
