= Maddelynn Hatter =

Drag performer

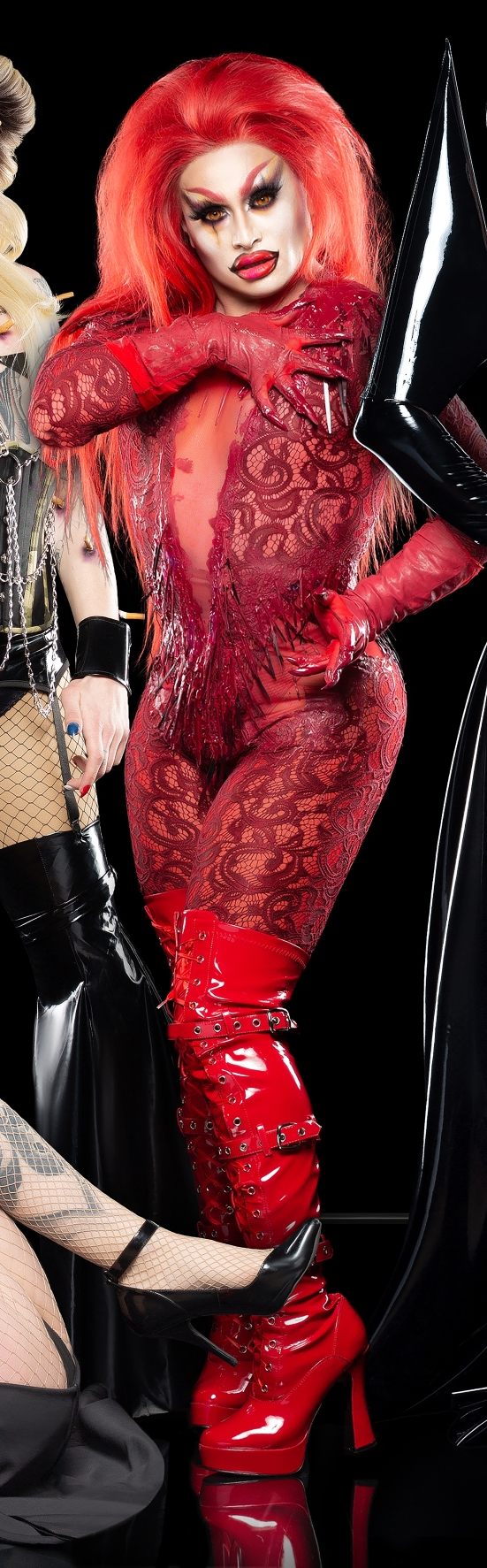
- Born: Massachusetts, U.S.
- Occupation: Drag performer
- Television: The Boulet Brothers' Dragula (season 3)

Maddelynn Hatter is an American drag performer and photographer from Brooklyn, New York who competed on the third season of the reality competition series The Boulet Brothers' Dragula.

== Early life ==
Maddelynn Hatter is originally from Northampton / Springfield area, in the U.S. state of Massachusetts.

== Career ==
When she was around 12 or 13 years old, Maddelynn Hatter was fascinated by Marilyn Manson and began to take an interest in cosmetics. Her mother helped her put on makeup and Maddelynn Hatter also started doing photography. At the age of 16, she went to a gay club in Springfield, where a drag queen was performing. Maddelynn Hatter moved back to Massachusetts for a few years before relocating to Brooklyn in 2011, when she started doing drag and photography professionally.

Locally, Maddelynn Hatter has performed at The Ritz, The Rosemont, and Macri Park. She has also hosted a competition at Hush called "Mother". In 2024, she appeared in the music video for Big Dipper's song "Skank". Maddelynn Hatter photographed Aja and the House of Aja for Sasha Velour's hardcover art book Velour: The Drag Magazine (2018).

Maddelynn Hatter competed on the third season (2019) of The Boulet Brothers' Dragula, where she placed sixth overall. During her time on the show, she placed in the bottom on the third and sixth episodes. Her drag style has been described as "deliciously dark". Pride.com included her in a 2024 list of 35 of the "funniest" drag performer names.

== Personal life ==
Maddelynn Hatter is based in New York City. Among her "drag daughters" are Privilege and Victoria Black. Maddelynn Hatter is also the "drag grandmother" of Dollya Black.

== Filmography ==
=== Television ===
- The Boulet Brothers' Dragula (season 3)

=== Web series ===
- Transformations (with James St. James)

== See also ==
- List of people from New York City
- List of photographers
