= The Boulet Brothers' Dragula season 6 =

Sixth season of 'The Boulet Brothers' Dragula'

The Boulet Brothers' Dragula
- Season 6
- Promotional poster for season six
- Hosted by: The Boulet Brothers
- Judges: Dracmorda Boulet; Swanthula Boulet
- No. of contestants: 12
- Winner: Asia Consent
- Runners-up: Auntie Heroine; Grey Matter
- No. of episodes: 10

Release
- Original network: AMC+/Shudder (United States)
- Original release: 1 October – 3 December 2024

Season chronology
- ← Previous; Season 5 Next → Season 7

The sixth season of The Boulet Brothers' Dragula, also referred to as Season 666 in promotional materials, premiered on October 1, 2024, on AMC+ and Shudder. The season was confirmed by Shudder on December 5, 2023. It featured twelve drag performers competing for the title of The World's Next Drag Supermonster.

== Production ==
On December 13, 2023, it was announced via the shows official Instagram page that casting for the sixth season was now open. Applications remained open for five weeks until closing on January 17, 2024.

The cast was officially revealed on September 10, 2024, featuring 12 contestants competing for the title of World's Next Drag Supermonster and a cash prize of $100,000.

== Contestants ==
Contestants of The Boulet Brothers' Dragula season 6
Contestant	Age	Hometown	Outcome
Asia Consent	28	Portland, Oregon	Winner
Auntie Heroine	32	Rockford, Illinois	Runners-up
Grey Matter	32	Houston, Texas	Runners-up
Yuri (Note: Now known as Yuri, they were referred to as Yuri Guaii on RuPaul's Drag Race Down Under season 2 where they placed 6th.)	28	Auckland, New Zealand	4th place
Pi	30	Philadelphia, Pennsylvania	5th place
Jaharia	28	Kansas City, Missouri	6th place
Aurora Gozmic	30	Chicago, Illinois	7th place
Vivvi the Force	35	San Diego, California	8th place
Majesty (Note: Now known as Majesty, they were referred to as James Majesty on The Boulet Brothers' Dragula season 2, where they placed as a runner-up.)	30	Portland, Oregon	9th place (Note: Majesty quit the competition.)
Desiree Dik	31	Washington, D.C.	10th place
Scylla (Note: Scylla Kone is referred to as Scylla on the show.)	24	Chicago, Illinois	11th place
Severity Stone	36	Providence, Rhode Island	12th place

== Contestant progress ==
Legend:

Asia Consent won The Boulet Brothers' Dragula season 6.
Auntie Heroine and Grey Matter were the runners-up.
WIN indicates that the contestant won the challenge.
SAFE indicates that the contestant was declared safe.
IMM (Immunity) indicates that Scylla obtained a scroll with the power of granting for herself or a fellow contestant immunity from the extermination, choosing herself.
BTM (Bottom) indicates that the contestant was up for extermination.
QUIT indicates that Majesty quit the competition.
EXT (Exterminated) indicates that the contestant was exterminated.

Contestants progress with placements in each episode
Contestant	Episode									
Contestant	1	2	3	4	5	6	7	8	9	10
Asia Consent	WIN	SAFE	WIN	SAFE	SAFE	SAFE	BTM	SAFE	WIN	Winner
Auntie Heroine	SAFE	WIN	SAFE	SAFE	BTM	SAFE	WIN	BTM	BTM	Runner-up
Grey Matter	SAFE	SAFE	SAFE	BTM	SAFE	WIN	WIN	SAFE	BTM	Runner-up
Yuri	SAFE	SAFE	BTM	SAFE	SAFE	SAFE	SAFE	WIN	EXT	
Pi	SAFE	SAFE	SAFE	SAFE	WIN	SAFE	SAFE	EXT		
Jaharia	SAFE	SAFE	SAFE	SAFE	SAFE	BTM	EXT			
Aurora Gozmic	BTM	SAFE	SAFE	WIN	SAFE	EXT				
Vivvi the Force	SAFE	SAFE	SAFE	BTM	EXT					
Majesty	SAFE	SAFE	SAFE	SAFE	QUIT					
Desiree Dik	SAFE	BTM	EXT							
Scylla	IMM	EXT								
Severity Stone	EXT									

== Exterminations ==
Legend:

The contestant was exterminated after their first time in the bottom.
The contestant was exterminated after their second time in the bottom.

Episode	Contestants			Challenge	Exterminated
1	Aurora Gozmic	vs.	Severity Stone	Dive with sharks without a protective cage.	Severity Stone
2	Desiree Dik	vs.	Scylla	Get pierced with hypodermic needles.	Scylla
3	Desiree Dik	vs.	Yuri	Skydive from a plane 10,000 ft. in the air.	Desiree Dik
4	Grey Matter	vs.	Vivvi the Force	Endure the shocks from a tesla coil.	None (Note: Due to Majesty quitting the competition, no contestant was exterminated.)
5	Auntie Heroine	vs.	Vivvi the Force	Perform in a lip-sync battle to "Waiting" by The Dahli.	Vivvi the Force
6	Aurora Gozmic	vs.	Jaharia	Stay in vacuum-sealed latex for as long as possible while getting electrocuted.	Aurora Gozmic
7	Asia Consent	vs.	Jaharia	Correctly answer three riddles; get a tattoo that grows bigger with each incorrect answer.	Jaharia
8	Auntie Heroine	vs.	Pi	Stay in a freezer that can reach up to −94 °F (−70 °C) for as long as possible.	Pi
9	Auntie Heroine vs. Grey Matter vs. Yuri			In a Dead by Daylight-inspired challenge, collect as many coffins as possible while avoiding paintball shots.	Yuri

== Guest judges ==
Episode	Guest judges
1	Akela Cooper, screenwriter and television producer Jamie Clayton, actress and model
2	Don Mancini, screenwriter, director, and producer Jennifer Tilly, actress
3	Tananarive Due, author Tatiana Maslany, actress
4	Justin Simien, actor, filmmaker, and author Landon Cider, drag king and winner of season 3
5	Alaska Thunderfuck, drag queen, musician, and television personality Darren Stein, filmmaker
6	Mike Flanagan, filmmaker Violet Chachki, drag queen
7	David Dastmalchian, actor, writer, and producer Landon Cider, drag king and winner of season 3
8	Darcy the Mail Girl (Diana Prince), horror host Joe Bob Briggs, film critic, writer, actor, and horror host
9	Mathieu Coté, video game creator Niohuru X, drag performer and winner of season 5

== Episodes ==
Episode	Title	Original airdate	Episode summary
1	Welcome to Hell!	October 1, 2024	Fright Feat Challenge: Find your way through the haunted house and find a scroll for immunity; failure to finish will result in instant extermination from the competition. Fright Feat Prize: Immunity from extermination for the winner; all the contestants also received Boulet Brothers' merchandise and a boxset of Mehron Cosmetics. Fright Feat Winner: Scylla Floor Show Challenge: Create a look inspired by the theme "Horror Icons Reimagined" and present it on the main stage.: Asia Consent chose Art the Clown from the Terrifier film series; Auntie Heroine chose Audrey II from the Little Shop of Horrors films and musical; Aurora Gozmic chose the Mummy from The Mummy film series; Desiree Dik chose the animatronics from the Five Nights at Freddy'sFive Nights at Freddy's franchise; Grey Matter chose Leatherface from The Texas Chainsaw Massacre film series; Jaharia chose the Gill-man from the Creature from the Black LagoonCreature from the Black Lagoon; Majesty and Yuri chose Count Dracula from Bram Stoker's Dracula; Pi chose the Sandworm from the Beetlejuice film series; Scylla chose the Human Centipede from the film series of the same name; Severity Stone chose the Candyman from the film series of the same name; Vivvi the Force chose Pinhead from the Hellraiser film series; Floor Show Prize: $2,500 in high heels, shoes, or boots from FierceQueen.com; Floor Show Winner: Asia Consent Extermination Challenge: Shark-diving without a protective cage. Participants: Aurora Gozmic and Severity Stone; Exterminated: Severity Stone
2	Killer Dolls	October 8, 2024	Fright Feat Challenge: Compete in a game of dodgeball. Fright Feat Prize: Curse another contestant with "The Doll Parts Curse," forcing them to get ready for the floor show with one arm duct-taped to their body. Fright Feat Winner: Jaharia; Cursed Contestant: Auntie Heroine Floor Show Challenge: Create a look inspired by the theme "Killer Dolls" and present it on the main stage while performing a lipsync to "I Love Hollywood" by Slayyyter. Floor Show Prize: $2,500 shopping spree to Dolls Kill; Floor Show Winner: Auntie Heroine Extermination Challenge: Being pierced by hypodermic needles. Participants: Desiree Dik and Scylla; Exterminated: Scylla
3	Holiday of Horrors	October 15, 2024	Fright Feat Challenge: Create a flirtatious dating profile video for the Taimi app while eating bonbons filled with pig brains and fish sauce. Fright Feat Prize: Curse another contestant with "The Mirror Mirror Curse," replacing their mirror with a small compact while they get ready for the floor show. Fright Feat Winner: Asia Consent; Cursed Contestant: Grey Matter Floor Show Challenge: Create a look inspired by the theme "Holiday of Horrors" and present it on the main stage in the filthiest way possible.: Asia Consent chose Mother's Day; Auntie Heroine chose Halloween; Aurora Gozmic and Pi chose Baby New Year; Desiree Dik chose Thanksgiving; Grey Matter chose Easter; Jaharia chose her birthday; Majesty and Vivvi the Force chose Independence Day; Yuri chose Valentine's Day; Floor Show Winner: Asia Consent Extermination Challenge: Skydiving from a plane 10,000 ft. in the air. Participants: Desiree Dik and Yuri; Exterminated: Desiree Dik
4	The Ghost Train	October 22, 2024	Floor Show Challenge: In groups of three, create a look inspired by the theme "Ghost Train" and present it on location at a train graveyard while performing a lipsync to "The Ghost Train" by the Boulet Brothers. Teams: Asia Consent, Aurora Gozmic & Vivvi the Force; Auntie Heroine, Jaharia & Pi; Grey Matter, Majesty & Yuri; Floor Show Winner: Aurora Gozmic Extermination Challenge: Endure the shocks from a tesla coil. Participants: Grey Matter and Vivvi the Force; Exterminated: None
5	Dragula The Musical	October 29, 2024	Quit: Majesty Floor Show Challenge: Perform a theater number as a group to a song from Alaska's production "Drag: The Musical"; Teams: The Snake Pit: Asia Consent, Aurora Gozmic, Jaharia, Pi; Rat House Fever: Auntie Heroine, Grey Matter, Vivvi the Force, Yuri; Floor Show Winner: Pi Extermination Challenge: Do a lip-sync performance to Season 4 Winner Dahli's song "Waiting"; Participants: Auntie Heroine and Vivvi the Force; Exterminated: Vivvi the Force
6	Monochrome Monster	November 5, 2024	Fright Feat Challenge: Do quick drag using only the tools actor and film makeup artist Lon Chaney used. Fright Feat Prize: Cast the Boulet Blindness Curse, forcing one contestant to do their makeup for the floorshow without sight. Fright Feat Winner: Pi; Cursed Contestant: Grey Matter Floor Show Challenge: Present an original black and white monster runway inspired by silent horror films and present a silent movie script to go alongside the character. Floor Show Winner: Grey Matter Extermination Challenge: Being bound to the wall inside of a latex vacuum chamber and electrocuted down the back. Participants: Aurora Gozmic and Jaharia; Exterminated: Aurora Gozmic
7	Dungeons and Drag Queens: The Underdark	November 12, 2024	Floor Show Challenge: Present an original Dungeons and Drag Queens look and choreograph a partner battle sequence. Teams: Asia Consent (Tiefling Beastmaster) and Yuri (Troll Warlock); Auntie Heroine (Troll Druid) and Grey Matter (Goblin Warrior); Jaharia (Goblin Wizard) and Pi (Orc Warrior); Floor Show Winner: Auntie Heroine and Grey Matter Extermination Challenge: Correctly answer three riddles; incorrectly answering means getting a bad wizard tattoo that will get larger with each wrong answer Participants: Asia Consent and Jaharia; Exterminated: Jaharia
8	Frankenhooker	November 19, 2024	Fright Feat Challenge: Answer Dragula trivia while wearing a shock collar; each incorrect answer causing the contestant to get zapped. Fright Feat Prize: Cast the Curse of Baldness, forcing one contestant to perform the floorshow without a wig. Fright Feat Winner: Asia Consent; Cursed Contestant: Asia Consent Floor Show Challenge: Create a sexy "Frankenhooker" monster and choreograph a Video vixen lip-sync to "Touch Me (I Want Your Body)" by Samantha Fox. Floor Show Winner: Yuri Extermination Challenge: Being locked in a freezer that can reach up to −94 °F (−70 °C). Participants: Auntie Heroine and Pi; Exterminated: Pi
9	Dead By Daylight	November 26, 2024	Fright Feat Challenge: Pick a Dead by Daylight game cartridge from a jar full of tarantulas. Fright Feat Winner: All 4 contestants Floor Show Challenge: Design and create a look for the Dragula's Dead by Daylight fictional expansion, "Urban Myths" and create a signature kill move. Floor Show Prize: Have their look featured as a playable skin in Dead by Daylight as a part of the Boulet Brothers' expansion: Asia Consent chose a Winter Wendigo and their signature kill move was Glacial Gutting; Auntie Heroine chose a Piasa Bird and their signature kill move was Batty Bludgeon; Grey Matter chose a Satyr and their signature kill move was Bone Impaler; Yuri chose a Mud Mermaid and their signature kill move was Drowned Demise; Floor Show Winner: Asia Consent Extermination Challenge: Collect small coffins with blood points inside of them hidden around a Dead by Daylight set while being shot at by paintball guns; every successful shot takes away one point Participants: Auntie Heroine, Grey Matter, and Yuri; Exterminated: Yuri
10	The Grand Finale	December 3, 2024	Floor Show Challenge: Create and present three looks, each representing one of the tenets of Dragula: filth, horror, and glamour. Floor Show Prize: The title and crown of the World's Next Drag Supermonster, $100,000, a life-time of special-effects makeup from Ben Nye and a merchandising development deal with PEG management. Winner: Asia Consent
