= The Boulet Brothers' Dragula season 5 =

Fifth season of 'The Boulet Brothers' Dragula'

The Boulet Brothers' Dragula
- Season 5
- Promotional poster for season five
- Hosted by: The Boulet Brothers
- Judges: Dracmorda Boulet; Swanthula Boulet; Landon Cider
- No. of contestants: 11
- Winner: Niohuru X
- Runners-up: Blackberri; Orkgotik; Throb Zombie
- No. of episodes: 10

Release
- Original network: AMC+/Shudder (United States)
- Original release: 31 October 2023 – 16 January 2024

Season chronology
- ← Previous; Season 4 Next → Season 6

The fifth season of The Boulet Brothers' Dragula premiered on 31 October 2023 on AMC+ and Shudder. The season was confirmed by Shudder on 7 December 2021.

== Production ==
On 15 December 2022, it was announced via the shows official Instagram page that casting for the fifth season was now open. Applications remained open for eight weeks until closing on 31 January 2023.

On September 19, 2023, season 3 winner Landon Cider was announced to be joining the judging panel as a rotating judge.

The cast was officially revealed on 3 October 2023, featuring 11 contestants competing for the title of World's Next Drag Supermonster and a cash prize of $100,000.

== Contestants ==
Contestants of The Boulet Brothers' Dragula season 5
Contestant	Age	Hometown	Outcome
Niohuru X	26	Tianjin, China	Winner
Blackberri	33	Houston, Texas	Runners-up
Orkgotik	26	Buenos Aires, Argentina	Runners-up
Throb Zombie	34	Boston, Massachusetts	Runners-up
Fantasia Royale Gaga	35	Miami, Florida	5th place
Cynthia Doll	30	Kansas City, Missouri	6th place
Jay Kay	28	New York City, New York	7th place (Note: Jay Kay originally placed eleventh before re-entering the competition.)
Anna Phylactic	41	Manchester, United Kingdom	8th place
Jarvis Hammer	32	Atlanta, Georgia	9th place
Satanna	27	Los Angeles, California	10th place
Onyx Ondyx	31	Philadelphia, Pennsylvania	11th place

== Contestant progress ==
Legend:

Niohuru X won The Boulet Brothers' Dragula season 5.
Blackberri, Orkgotik and Throb Zombie were the runners-up.
WIN indicates that the contestant won the challenge.
SAFE indicates that the contestant was declared safe by the judges.
KEY indicates that Jarvis Hammer obtained a key with the power of granting himself immunity or nominating a fellow contestant for the extermination, choosing to nominate Orkgotik.
BTM (Bottom) indicates that the contestant was up for extermination.
EXT (Exterminated) indicates that the contestant was exterminated.

Contestants progress with placements in each episode
Contestant	Episode									
Contestant	1	2	3	4	5	6	7	8	9	10
Niohuru X	WIN	SAFE	SAFE	SAFE	BTM	SAFE	WIN	BTM	Guest	Winner
Blackberri	SAFE	SAFE	SAFE	SAFE	SAFE	WIN	SAFE	BTM	Guest	Runner-up
Orkgotik	SAFE	SAFE	BTM	SAFE	WIN	SAFE	BTM	WIN	Guest	Runner-up
Throb Zombie	SAFE	WIN	SAFE	SAFE	SAFE	SAFE	SAFE	BTM	Guest	Runner-up
Fantasia Royale Gaga	SAFE	SAFE	SAFE	WIN	SAFE	BTM	SAFE	EXT	Guest	
Cynthia Doll	SAFE	BTM	SAFE	SAFE	SAFE	SAFE	EXT		Guest	
Jay Kay	EXT	SAFE	WIN	BTM	SAFE	EXT			Guest	
Anna Phylactic	SAFE	SAFE	BTM	SAFE	EXT				Guest	
Jarvis Hammer	SAFE	SAFE	KEY	EXT					Guest	
Satanna	BTM	SAFE	EXT						Guest	
Onyx Ondyx	SAFE	EXT							Guest	

== Exterminations ==
Legend:

The contestant was exterminated after their first time in the bottom.
The contestant was exterminated after their second time in the bottom.
The contestant was exterminated after their third time in the bottom.

Episode	Contestants			Challenge	Exterminated
1	Jay Kay	vs.	Satanna	Hike five miles to the Bridge to Nowhere and then bungee jump off.	Jay Kay
2	Cynthia Doll	vs.	Onyx Ondyx	Using only your mouth, transfer as many maggots as you can from a tub to a beaker across the room.	Onyx Ondyx
3	Anna Phylactic vs. Orkgotik vs. Satanna			Be tied down to a bed and covered in cheese and rats.	Satanna
4	Jarvis Hammer	vs.	Jay Kay	Perform in a lip-sync battle to "Worldwide Torture" by Jazmin Bean.	Jarvis Hammer
5	Anna Phylactic	vs.	Niohuru X	Get a trashy tattoo somewhere on your body.	Anna Phylactic
6	Fantasia Royale Gaga	vs.	Jay Kay	Get hooked up to an "alien birthing simulator" and endure the pain longer than the other contestant.	Jay Kay
7	Cynthia Doll	vs.	Orkgotik	Navigate a laser maze while high-voltage shocks are administered for taking any wrong turns.	Cynthia Doll
8	Blackberri	vs.	Niohuru X	In pairs of two, fight head-to-head with pugil sticks.	Fantasia Royale Gaga
8	Fantasia Royale Gaga	vs.	Throb Zombie	In pairs of two, fight head-to-head with pugil sticks.	Fantasia Royale Gaga

== Guest judges ==
Episode	Guest Judges
1	Mike Flanagan, filmmaker and writer Felissa Rose, actress and producer
2	Matthew Lillard, actor and director
3	Tananarive Due, author and educator
5	Dahli, winner of The Boulet Brothers' Dragula season 4, runner-up of The Boulet Brothers' Dragula: Resurrection and competed on The Boulet Brothers' Dragula season 2 Jazmin Bean, singer/songwriter, social media personality and makeup artist
6	David Dastmalchian, film, television, and stage actor Lauren LaVera, actress and stunt performer
7	Victoria Black, winner of The Boulet Brothers' Dragula: Titans, runner-up of The Boulet Brothers' Dragula season 2 and 2nd runner-up of The Boulet Brothers' Dragula: Resurrection; Darren Stein, director, screenwriter, and producer
8	Kevin Smith, director, producer, screenwriter, actor and comic book writer Harley Quinn Smith, actress and musician

== Episodes ==
Episode	Title	Original airdate	Episode summary
1	Terror in the Woods	October 31, 2023	Fright Feat Challenge: Find your way through the haunted woods to Base Camp; failure to finish will result in instant extermination from the competition. Fright Feat Prize: A boxset of Black Moon Cosmetics. Fright Feat Winners: All 11 contestants Floor Show Challenge: Create a look inspired by the theme "Terror in the Woods" and present it on the main stage. Floor Show Winner: Niohuru X Extermination Challenge: Hike five miles to the Bridge to Nowhere and then bungee jump off. Participants: Jay Kay and Satanna; Exterminated: Jay Kay
2	Trash Can Children	November 7, 2023	Returned: Jay Kay Fright Feat Challenge: Be the fastest to chug a "garbage smoothie" made from jellied eels, chitlins, kidneys and trash juice. Fright Feat Prize: Curse another contestant with "The Curse of the Teletubby Toilet Bowl," forcing them to do their makeup in a porta-potty. Fright Feat Winner: Jay Kay; Cursed Contestant: Cynthia Doll Floor Show Challenge: Create a look inspired by the theme "Trashcan Children" and present it on the main stage in the filthiest way possible. Floor Show Winner: Throb Zombie Extermination Challenge: Using only your mouth, transfer as many maggots as you can from a tub to a beaker across the room. Participants: Cynthia Doll and Onyx Ondyx; Exterminated: Onyx Ondyx
3	The Haunted Hotel	November 14, 2023	Fright Feat Challenge: Pick a key at random, one of which is the "Key of Life and Death". Fright Feat Prize: Use the "Key of Life and Death" to either save yourself or another contestant from extermination, or put another contestant up for extermination. Fright Feat Winner: Jarvis Hammer; Key Usage: Put Orkgotik up for extermination. Floor Show Challenge: Create a look inspired by the theme "Haunted Hotel" and present it on the main stage while performing a lip-sync to "At the Devil's Ball". Floor Show Winner: Jay Kay Extermination Challenge: Be tied down to a bed and covered in cheese and rats. Participants: Anna Phylactic, Orkgotik and Satanna; Exterminated: Satanna
4	Monsters of Rock (Part 1)	November 21, 2023	Floor Show Challenge: Create a look inspired by the theme "Monsters of Rock" and present it on the main stage in order to move forward to the Battle of the Bands in the following episode. Floor Show Winner: Fantasia Royale Gaga Extermination Challenge: Perform in a lip-sync battle to "Worldwide Torture" by Jazmin Bean. Participants: Jarvis Hammer and Jay Kay Exterminated: Jarvis Hammer
5	Monsters of Rock (Part 2)	November 28, 2023	Floor Show Challenge: Divided in two bands, record backup vocals and perform a remix of the Boulet Brothers' song "Gods of Death" in a Battle of the Bands on the main stage. Bands: Chaotik (Orkgotik, Cynthia Doll, Jay Kay & Throb Zombie) and Hell's 4 Play (Fantasia Royale Gaga, Anna Phylactic, Niohuru X & Blackberri) Winning Band: Chaotik; Floor Show Winner: Orkgotik Extermination Challenge: Get a trashy tattoo somewhere on your body. Participants: Anna Phylactic and Niohuru X Exterminated: Anna Phylactic
6	Pleasure Planet X	December 5, 2023	Floor Show Challenge: Create a look inspired by the theme "Pleasure Planet X" and present it on the main stage while acting out an original script to sell your intergalactic sex-worker. Floor Show Winner: Blackberri Extermination Challenge: Get hooked up to an "alien birthing simulator" and endure the pain longer than the other contestant. Participants: Fantasia Royale Gaga and Jay Kay Exterminated: Jay Kay
7	The Blacklight Haunted House	December 12, 2023	Fright Feat Challenge: Using only a 99-cents store Halloween make-up kit, do a full face of make-up in 10 minutes. Fright Feat Prize: Immunity from extermination. Fright Feat Winner: Throb Zombie Floor Show Challenge: Create a look inspired by the theme "Neon Haunted House", including a second look only visible under reflective blacklight, and present it on the main stage. Floor Show Winner: Niohuru X Extermination Challenge: Navigate a laser maze while high-voltage shocks are administered for taking any wrong turns. Participants: Cynthia Doll and Orkgotik; Exterminated: Cynthia Doll
8	Drag Kaiju	December 19, 2023	Floor Show Challenge: Create a look inspired by the theme "Drag Kaijus" and present it on the main stage. Floor Show Winner: Orkgotik Extermination Challenge: In pairs of two, fight head-to-head with pugil sticks. Participants: Blackberri vs Niohuru X and Fantasia Royale Gaga vs. Throb Zombie; Exterminated: Fantasia Royale Gaga
9	The Last Supper Reunion	January 9, 2024	The cast reunites to revisit the season.
10	The Grand Finale	January 16, 2024	Floor Show Challenge: Create and present three looks, each representing one of the tenets of Dragula: filth, horror, and glamour. To accompany the glamour floorshow, perform a lip sync to "Destroy Everything You Touch" by Ladytron. Floor Show Prize: A headlining spot on the upcoming Dragula World Tour, $100,000 and The title of the World's Next Drag Supermonster; Winner: Niohuru X
