= Sexy Galexy =

Australian drag king performer, and DJ

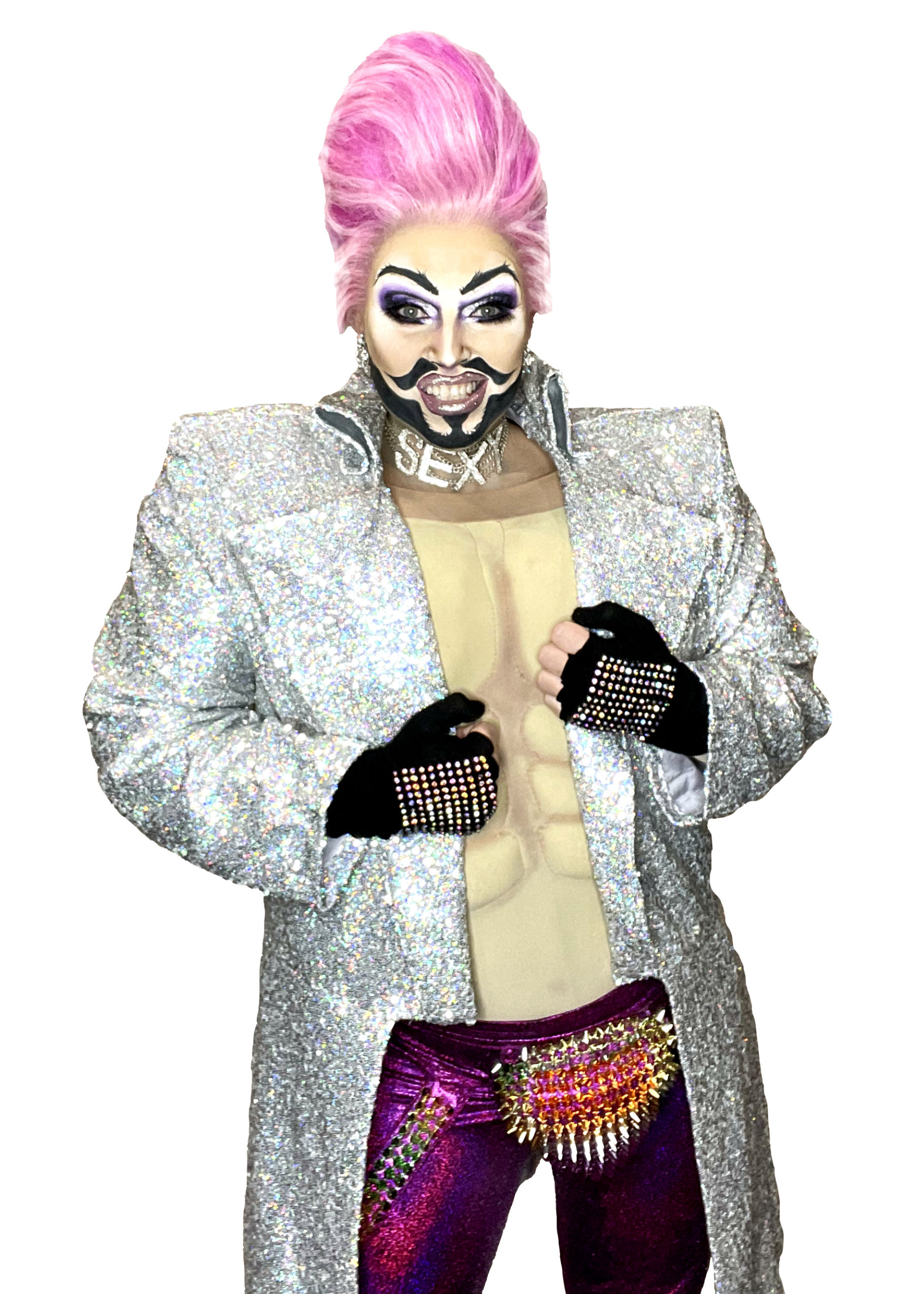
- In support of Movemebr
- Born: Karen Leigh Gillingham
- Occupations: Drag king, performer, DJ
- Years active: 1993 – present
- Website: www.sexygalexy.com

Sexy Galexy is an Australian drag king performer and DJ.

== Career ==
Sexy Galexy began her career performing in drag shows and events in her hometown of Perth during the early 1990s, during the golden age of lesbian and drag king culture. Sexy Galexy performed in the Drag King Sydney which ran from 1999 to 2000. In 2002, Sexy Galexy founded the weekly event Kingki Kingdom in 2002. Kingki Kingdom became popular in the lesbian community as a venue for expression and community involvement. Sexy Galexy performed at the 2005 Sydney Gay and Lesbian Mardi Gras. She was a reporter at the Sydney Gay and Lesbian Mardi Gras for QueerTV. In 2008, Sexy Galexy was featured on the cover of Gscene, a Brighton and Hove LGBT interest magazine.

Sexy Galexy returned to Perth in 2014 and performed the show "Manliness: The Angle of My Dangle". Prior to that, she had performed in pride festivals and drag shows in Europe and North America. Sexy Galexy is known for the live show "Manliness Mansion", which was performed at festivals Melbourne International Comedy Festival and Perth Fringe World in 2015.

In April 2020, Sexy Galexy appeared on Socially Distant, a drag livestream web series hosted by Landon Cider. Sexy Galexy has been cited as an inspiration by other drag kings such as Landon Cider and Adam All.
