= Maxi Glamour =

American drag artist

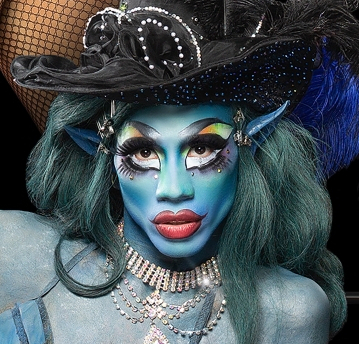
- Maxi Glamour in promotional artwork for season 3 of The Boulet Brothers' Dragula, 2019
- Born: St. Louis, Missouri, USA
- Other name: Maximus Amadeus Glamour
- Occupation: drag artist
- Television: The Boulet Brothers' Dragula (season 3)
- Website: maxiglamour.com

Maxi Glamour is the stage name of Maximus Amadeus Glamour, a non-binary multi-disciplinary drag artist and elected official from St. Louis, Missouri, and the self-titled "Demon Queen of Polka and Baklava". They were a contestant in Season 3 of The Boulet Brothers' Dragula.

== Artistic career ==
Glamour claims influences from the Dada movement and artist Marcel Duchamp. They call their own art form "Modernadada".

=== Dragula ===
Glamour is the first drag performer from St. Louis to appear on a major televised drag competition. Their international debut was in The Boulet Brothers' Dragula Season 3 in 2019. They participated in the first episode elimination challenge, which involved skydiving in drag, and were eliminated in the fourth episode.

=== Music ===
Glamour plays flute and other instruments. They signed with independent label Trans Trenderz for an experimental debut album, Modernadada, released in 2021. Q Review describes the album as a "battle-cry" and allegory for self-actualization.

=== Other ===
In 2023, Glamour collaborated with CuCo (Culture Collective) on a line of cannabis flower called Faeded, debuted at a show with the same name.

== Political career ==
=== Activism ===
Glamour founded the St. Louis-based Qu'art in 2014 to organize shows promoting diversity in the queer arts scene, citing PLUR (Peace Love Unity Respect) from the raver scene as an influence. Glamour is outspoken about the lack of Black performers at queer events in the St. Louis area, and has said, "If you're a producer and you're not putting Black people in your show, maybe you shouldn't be producing." Glamour also advocates for transgender, AFAB, and non-Black people of color performers. To promote civic and political education, each Qu'art event includes a panel featuring community leaders, activists, and artists speaking about issues that affect queer lives.

Glamour has also demonstrated in full drag, including in front of former mayor Lyda Krewson's home. Glamour created a petition calling for Krewson's resignation at a debate they organized focused on local LGBTQ+ issues for the 2021 St. Louis mayoral election, and in the Missouri House of Representatives when testifying against an anti-drag and anti-trans bill.

=== Committeeperson ===
Glamour is the first non-binary person to run for a committeeperson position in St. Louis. They won the election in 2024. However, as the state constitution prescribes only committeeman and committeewoman positions, Glamour was forced to label a binary gender identity on the ballot. Creating gender-neutral committeeperson positions would require a state constitutional amendment.
