= Monikkie Shame =

American drag performer

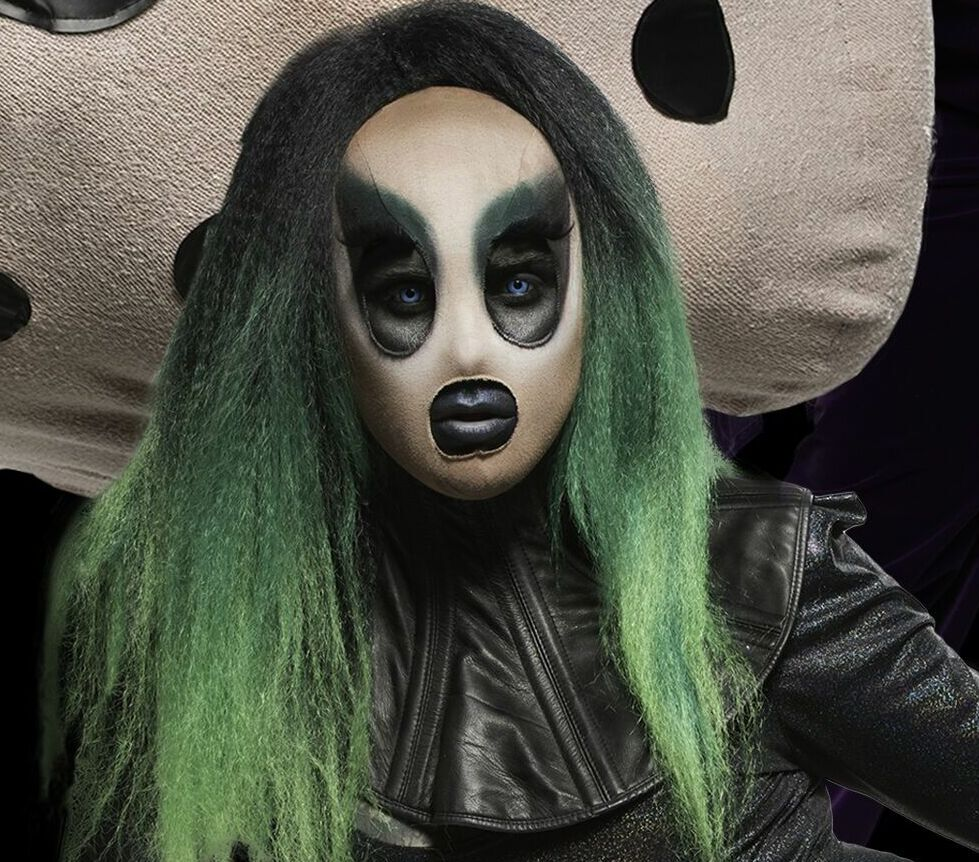
- Monikkie Shame in promotional artwork for season 2 of The Boulet Brothers' Dragula, 2017
- Born: Nathan Wayne
- Television: The Boulet Brothers' Dragula (season 2)

Monikkie Shame is the stage name of Nathan Wayne, an American drag performer who competed on the second season of The Boulet Brothers' Dragula.

== Career ==
Wayne competed as Monikkie Shame on the second season of The Boulet Brothers' Dragula. According to Screen Rant, she was the "first masked drag artist on any drag show on TV". She was "exterminated" (eliminated from the competition) after placing in the bottom twice in a row.

== Personal life ==
Wayne grew up in Richland, Washington and is based in Seattle.

== Filmography ==
=== Television ===
- The Boulet Brothers' Dragula (season 2)

== See also ==
- LGBTQ culture in Seattle
- List of people from Seattle
