= Jarvis Hammer =

American drag king

- Born: February 22, 1991 (age 35)
- Occupation: Drag king
- Television: The Boulet Brothers' Dragula (season 5)
- Website: jarvishammer.com

Jarvis Hammer is an American drag king who competed on season 5 of The Boulet Brothers' Dragula. Jarvis Hammer is based in Atlanta, in the U.S. state of Georgia, and uses the pronouns he/him. He began performing as Jarvis Hammer in 2019.

== Filmography ==
=== Television ===
- The Boulet Brothers' Dragula (season 5)

== See also ==
- List of drag kings
- List of people from Atlanta
