= Asia Consent =

American drag performer

- Born: Fullerton, California, U.S.
- Education: Clark College
- Occupation: Drag performer
- Television: The Boulet Brothers' Dragula (season 6)

Asia Consent is an American drag performer from Portland, Oregon, who is known for winning the sixth season of The Boulet Brothers' Dragula.

== Career ==
Asia Consent won the sixth season of The Boulet Brothers' Dragula. During her time on the show, she won three challenges and placed in the bottom once. Willamette Week said Asia Consent "quickly established herself as the one to beat with her eye for costuming, her stage presence and the warm charm of her confessional asides". For the season finale, the finalists were tasked with creating and presenting three looks in the categories Filth, Horror, and Glamour. Asia Consent showcased "a faeces-covered filth look, a possessed and distraught diva for her horror turn and a skeleton-encased gown for glamour", according to PinkNews.

== Personal life ==
Asia Consent was born in Fullerton, California, and raised in Camas, Washington. She lived in Los Angeles before moving to Portland, Oregon, in 2020. She attended Clark College in Vancouver, Washington, where she started doing drag. Asia Consent is transgender and mixed race. She is a fan of John Waters.

== Filmography ==
=== Television ===
- The Boulet Brothers' Dragula (season 6, 2024)

== See also ==
- LGBTQ culture in Portland, Oregon
- List of LGBTQ people from Portland, Oregon
- List of people from Portland, Oregon
- List of people from Vancouver, Washington
