= Aurora Gozmic =

Drag performer

- Born: Austin Lemoine; Marquette, Michigan, USA
- Occupation: Drag performer
- Television: The Boulet Brothers' Dragula (season 6)

Aurora Gozmic is the stage name of Austin Lemoine, a drag performer from Chicago, Illinois who competed on season 6 of The Boulet Brothers' Dragula.

== Personal life ==
Gozmic is of Italian descent. She grew up in Marquette, Michigan. Gozmic went to Northern Michigan University and performed at her university many times. As of 2020, Gozmic lived in the West Rogers Park neighborhood of Chicago. She is the drag grandmother of RuPaul's Drag Race season 16 contestant Plasma.

== Career ==
"The first drag queen that I ever saw on stage was Cass Marie Domino and she became my drag mom some years later," [Gozmic] said. "The first time I was on stage my drag name was actually Versace Ferrari, (and) I was not cute. My outfit consisted of a wig from Amazon, a cop hat, leather jacket and skirt made of my bedroom curtains. I performed Bad Kids by Lady Gaga and came in dead-last in the contest." - Gozmic's first time in drag when she was 16.

She appeared on season 6 of The Boulet Brothers' Dragula. Before Dragula, she was in the music video for Cupcakke's song “LGBT.”

== Filmography ==
=== Television ===
- The Boulet Brothers' Dragula (season 6)

== See also ==
- List of people from Chicago
- List of people from Marquette, Michigan
