= Neighbours Nightclub =

Nightclub in Seattle, Washington, U.S.

- Logo

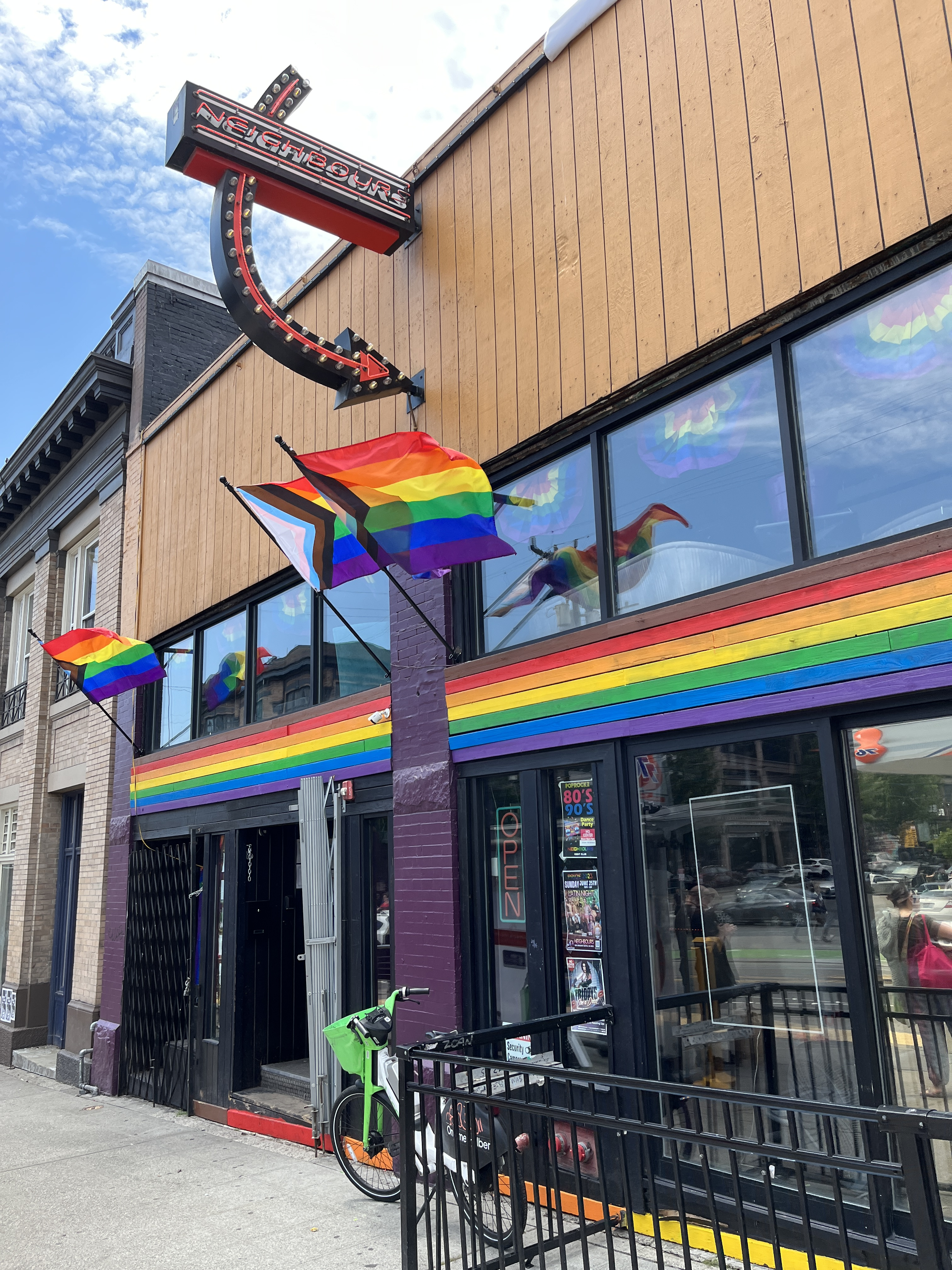
- The nightclub's exterior, 2023
- Interactive map of Neighbours Nightclub
- Address: 1509 Broadway; Seattle, Washington; United States
- Coordinates: 47.6144°N 122.3212°W

Neighbours Nightclub is a nightclub on Seattle's Capitol Hill, in the U.S. state of Washington. Neighbours is the city's "oldest LGBTQ+ club currently operating".

== Description ==
Neighbours Nightclub is an LGBTQ-friendly dance club on Seattle's Capitol Hill. Drag is a regular feature.

Lonely Planet said in 2021: "Neighbours is an always-packed dance factory that seems to attract as many straight folks as LGBTIQ+ ones these days, but is still a reliable good time if you're eager to lose yourself in some dance music with the bass turned up high."

In 2021, Fodor's said: "Neighbours is an institution thanks in part to its drag shows, great theme DJ nights, and relaxed atmosphere (everyone, including the straightest of the straights, seems to be welcome here). It's no longer the center of the gay and lesbian scene, but the dance floor and the rest of this large club is still usually packed Thursday through Sunday."

== History ==
Neighbours opened in 1983. According to The Stranger: "Before Seattle, Neighbours' first incarnation was in Vancouver—perhaps the origin of the Canadian spelling of the name. In 1982, Elassiouti expanded and opened a disco of the same name in its current location on Broadway and Pike. Seattle drag legend Crystal Lane fostered a new generation of drag community at Neighbours (as well as at the Brass Connection and Double Header of yore). Lane helped spur the club's tradition of fundraising drag events before her unfortunate passing in 1994."

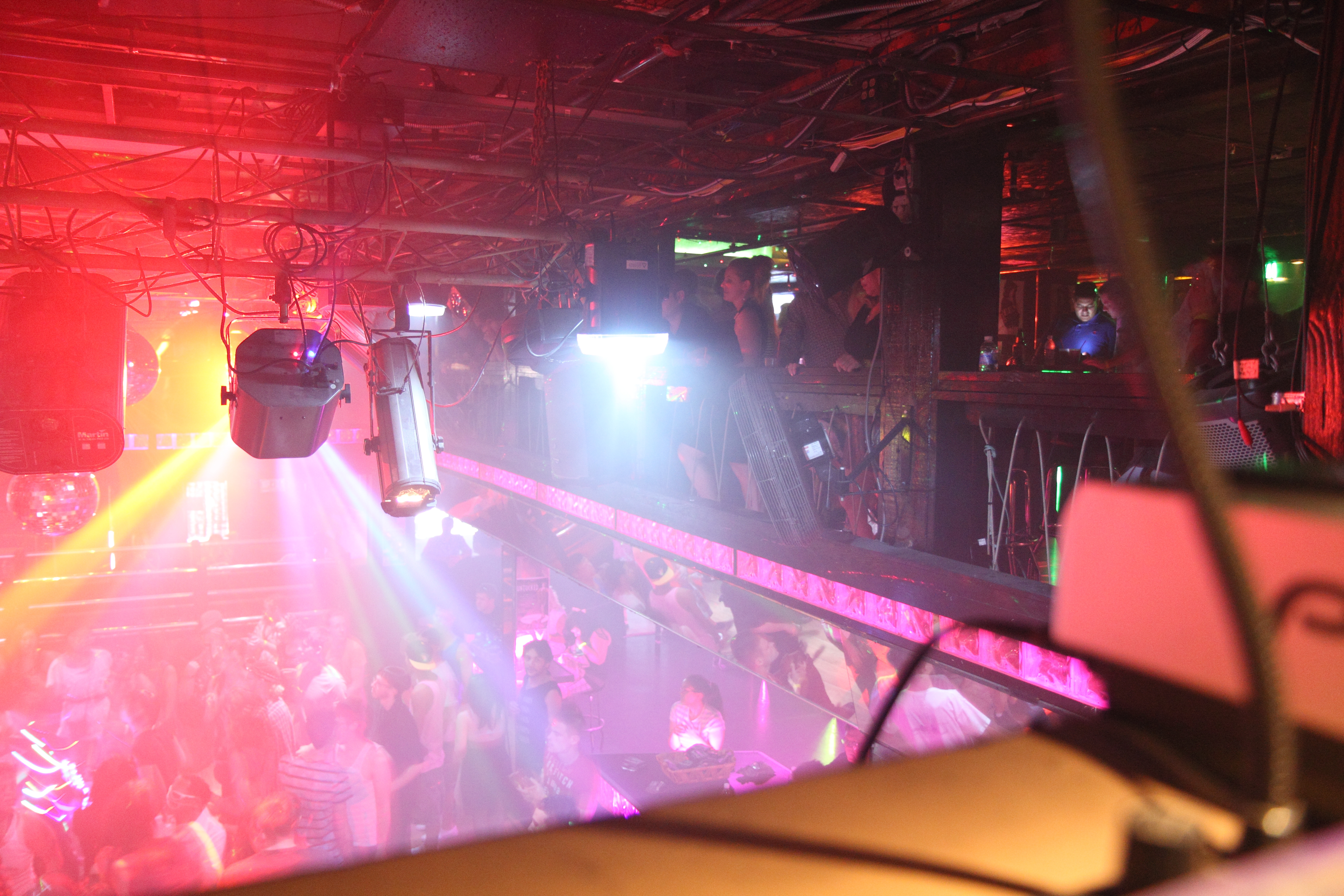
The nightclub's interior in 2010

In late 2013, a fire was started on a stairwell while approximately 750 people inside were celebrating New Year's Eve. Police arrested Musab Masmari for arson in February 2014; he received a ten-year sentence. Neighbours was damaged by arson again in August 2015.

Drag performer James Majesty has hosted the weekly drag event Level Up. In December 2018, the building housing Neighbours was placed on the market for $6.9 million. Like many businesses, Neighbours closed temporarily during the COVID-19 pandemic. In July 2020, the business experienced break-ins, and "squatters left the venue ransacked and damaged beyond recognition". The club was closed for 16 months and required "extensive cleanup".

== Reception ==
Cienna Madrid of The Stranger has called Neighbours a "gay institution". Frommer's rates Neighbours two out of three stars and says, "This has been the favorite dance club of Capitol Hill's gay community for years, with different nights of the week featuring different styles of music." Thrillist's Emma Banks included the business in a 2021 list of Seattle's best LGBTQ bars.
