= James Majesty =

Drag performer

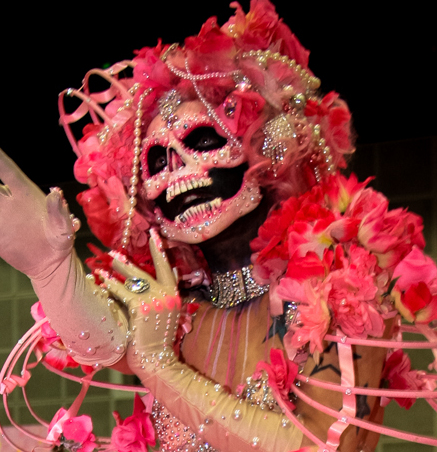
- James Majesty at RuPaul's DragCon LA in 2018
- Born: James Barker; 1993 or 1994 (age 31–32)
- Other name: Majesty
- Television: The Boulet Brothers' Dragula (season 2, season 6)

Majesty (formerly known as James Majesty) is the stage name of James Barker, an American drag performer who competed on season 2 and later season 6 of The Boulet Brothers' Dragula.

== Career ==
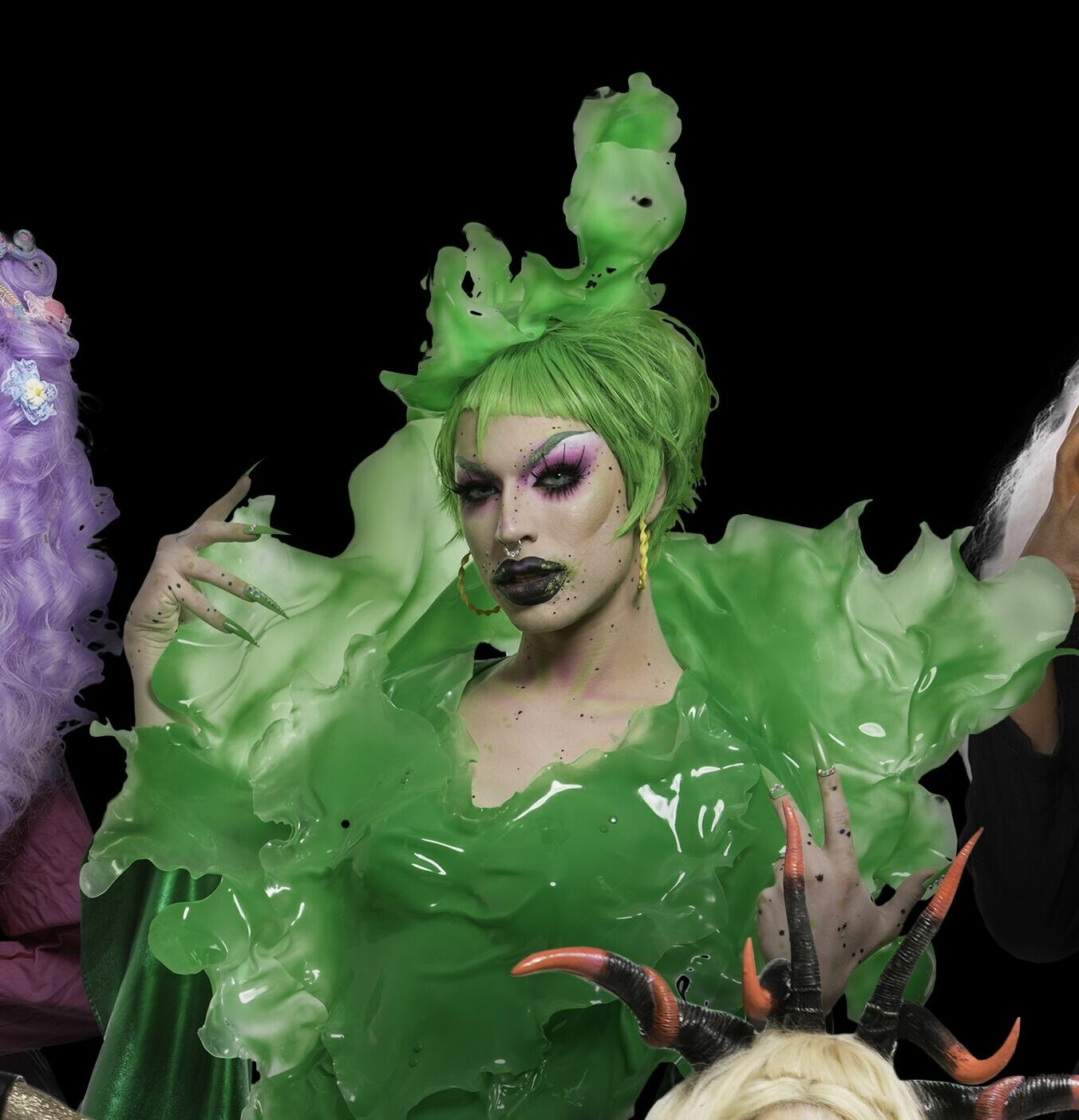
James Majesty in a promotional photograph for the second season of The Boulet Brothers' Dragula

James Majesty is a drag performer who was a finalist on season 2 of The Boulet Brothers' Dragula. They began performing in drag at age 14 after meeting Miss Coco Peru and subsequently watching the first season of RuPaul's Drag Race. Their "drag mother" is Connie Hung St. James. In Seattle, James Majesty has hosted the weekly drag event Level Up at Neighbours Nightclub.

In 2017, James Majesty appeared in the music video for "Big D*ck Daddy" by rapper Velo. James Majesty's debut album Pervert was released in 2018.

In 2024 they rebranded as simply Majesty. They later competed on season 6 of The Boulet Brothers' Dragula, ultimately placing ninth after choosing to remove themself from the competition.

== Personal life ==
James Majesty was raised in Idaho, is based in Portland, Oregon, and was previously based in Seattle. Now preferring he and they, James Majesty previously used all personal pronouns. They have cited their artistic influences to be Andy Warhol, Kevyn Aucoin, Cher, Edie Sedgwick, and Judi Dench.

== Discography ==
=== Albums ===
- "Pervert" (2018)

=== Singles ===
==== As main artist ====
- "Zombie (feat. Chi Chi LaRue)" (2018)
- "Get Off my Turf (feat. Disasterina)" (2019)
- "Red Headed Step Son" (2024)
- "Not Tonight" (2025)

==== As featured artist ====
- "A.S.M.R. (Velo feat. James Majesty)" (2019)

== Filmography ==
=== Television ===
- The Boulet Brothers' Dragula (season 2) - runner-up (2017)
- The Boulet Brothers' Dragula (season 6) - 9th place (2024)

=== Web series ===
- Transformations with James St. James (2014)

== See also ==
- LGBTQ culture in Portland, Oregon
- LGBTQ culture in Seattle
- List of people from Portland, Oregon
- List of people from Seattle
