= Hollow Eve =

American drag performer

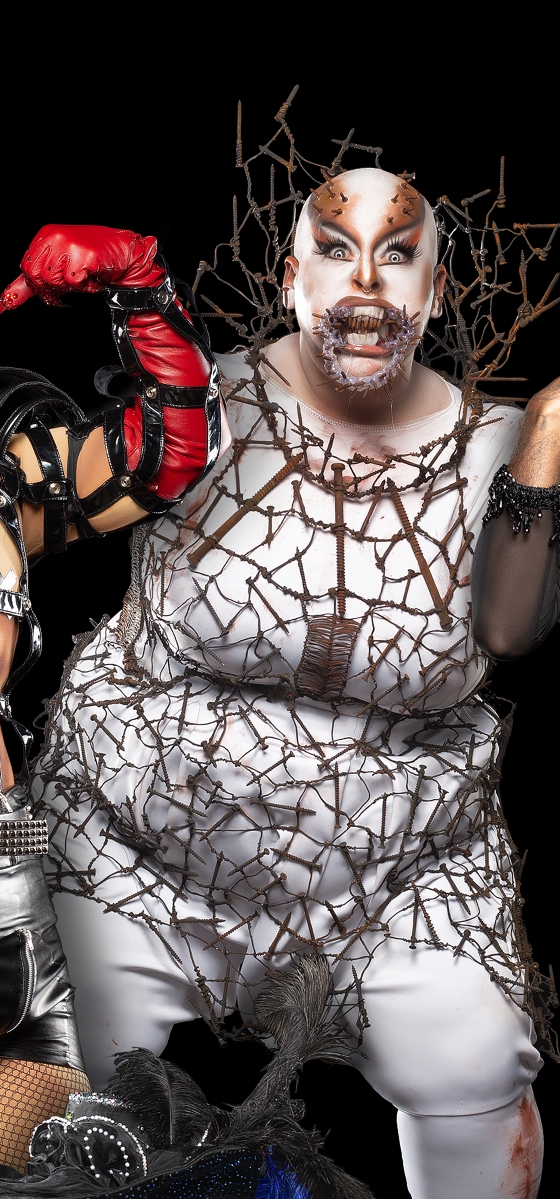
- Hollow Eve in promotional artwork on season 3 of The Boulet Brothers' Dragula, 2019
- Born: Caitlin Crandall
- Occupation: Drag performer
- Television: The Boulet Brothers' Dragula (season 3)

Hollow Eve is the stage name of Caitlin Crandall, an American drag performer who competed on the third season of The Boulet Brothers' Dragula.

== Early life and career ==
Caitlin Crandall was raised in Sebastopol, California, and danced ballet as a child. They studied theatre with a focus in technical theatre and lighting design at San Francisco State University.

Crandall made their first appearance in drag for a performance of The Rocky Horror Picture Show at the Phoenix Theater in 1996, at the age of 14. Their first performance as a drag entertainer was performed under the name "Rush Limber", a parody of Rush Limbaugh, at Trannyshack in 2003. They claim their "drag mothers" to be Phatima Rude and U-Phoria Glitter. Hollow Eve competed on the third season of The Boulet Brothers' Dragula, which aired in 2019. In 2020, during the COVID-19 pandemic, Hollow Eve was part of the line-up of the online Oaklash Drag Festival.

== Personal life ==
Hollow Eve is non-binary and uses all pronouns. They are from the San Francisco Bay Area, grew up in Sebastopol, California, and are currently based in San Francisco. They cite their artistic influences to be Björk, Joanna Newsom, and Bikini Kill, and describe themselves as a "post-binary drag socialist with a penchant for anarchy".

== Filmography ==
=== Television ===
- The Boulet Brothers' Dragula (season 3)
