= Dollya Black =

American drag performer

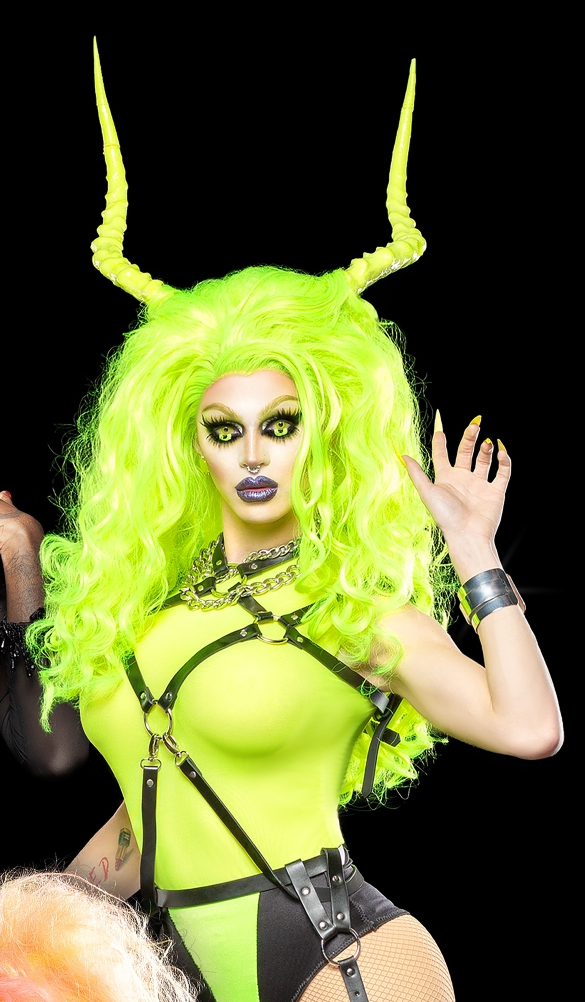
- Dollya Black in promotional artwork for season 3 of The Boulet Brothers' Dragula, 2019
- Born: Lake Panasoffkee, Florida, USA
- Other name: Dakota Hartenstein
- Occupation: Drag performer
- Television: The Boulet Brothers' Dragula (season 3); The Boulet Brothers' Dragula: Titans (season 2)

Dollya Black is the stage name of Dakota Hartenstein, an American drag performer from Orlando, Florida who competed on the third season of The Boulet Brothers' Dragula as well as the second season of The Boulet Brothers' Dragula: Titans.

== Personal life ==
Hartenstein is from a small town called Lake Panasoffkee, Florida and grew up there. While doing drag, Hartenstein also worked as a cosmetologist. She is a fan of Percy Jackson and The Lord of the Rings. She is a trans woman and uses she/her pronouns.

== Career ==
Dollya Black got her drag name from the Black Haüs, which season 2 contestant Victoria Black is also a member of, as well as murder victim Elizabeth Short, better known as the Black Dahlia. Her original stage name was Some Mercy Bitch. Dollya Black appeared on season 3 of The Boulet Brothers' Dragula, where she was a runner-up. In 2025, Black was announced to co-star in the TV show SHOOK! Queens of the Dead.

== Filmography ==
=== Television ===
- The Boulet Brothers' Dragula (season 3) - Runner-Up
- The Boulet Brothers' Dragula: Titans (season 2) - 10th Place

== See also ==
- List of people from Florida
