= Creme Fatale =

American drag queen and internet personality

Creme Fatale is an American drag queen and internet personality. In 2018, she launched the hashtag #wheresthetransformationsis, which brings visibility to women in drag art, who showcase their transformation through clothing and makeup.

== Life and career ==
Creme grew up with a strong interest in the arts from a young age, experimenting with various forms like theater and painting early on, though none fully captivated her. It wasn’t until she discovered RuPaul and the films of John Waters that she found her love for drag art.

Initially, she doubted whether a woman could perform drag or work as a drag queen, but this changed as she got involved in the drag scene in San Francisco, which has a decades-long tradition of women doing drag, sometimes called hyperqueens. She began performing around 2014, starting with a Club Kid style, and later adopting a more feminine aesthetic.

In June 2018, she worked as a makeup artist for "Inferno A-Go-Go", a show by RuPaul's Drag Race contestant BenDeLaCreme. She also performed regularly with artist Sasha Velour and appeared on the web series Transformations on YouTube, hosted by James St. James.

In October 2021, she was featured in On Makeup Magazine, photographed by Albert Sanchez.

Creme Fatale has been cited as an inspiration by many drag artists, including HoSo Terra Toma, Daya Bee-Dee, Ivory Onyx and Blakk Velvet.

== Personal life ==
Creme Fatale is a cisgender woman.
