= The Boulet Brothers' Dragula season 3 =

Third season of 'The Boulet Brothers' Dragula'

The Boulet Brothers' Dragula
- Season 3
- Promotional poster for season three
- Hosted by: The Boulet Brothers
- Judges: Dracmorda Boulet; Swanthula Boulet
- No. of contestants: 11
- Winner: Landon Cider
- Runners-up: Dollya Black; Priscilla Chambers
- No. of episodes: 10

Release
- Original network: Amazon Prime; OutTV (Canada); Netflix (United States)
- Original release: 27 August – 28 October 2019

Season chronology
- ← Previous; Season 2 Next → Season 4

The third season of The Boulet Brothers' Dragula premiered on August 27, 2019, and concluded on October 28, 2019. The competition was broadcast on Amazon Prime in the United States, Canada, Australia and the United Kingdom, OutTV in Canada and Netflix in the United States. The series featured 11 contestants, including a drag king and a AFAB drag artist, competing for the title of World's Next Drag Supermonster and a cash prize of $25,000.

On December 5, 2017, OutTV and Boulet Brothers Productions announced that the third season had been greenlit. The Boulet Brothers announced via Twitter on February 23, 2018, that casting would be starting soon and used the hashtag "Season of the Witch". Casting began on March 7, 2018 and finished twenty-one days later on March 28, 2018. The story producer is writer Clint Catalyst.

The winner of the third season of The Boulet Brothers' Dragula was Landon Cider, with Dollya Black and Priscilla Chambers as the runner-up. Priscilla Chambers and St. Lucia (now referred to simply as Saint) returned later to compete in The Boulet Brothers' Dragula: Resurrection, a competition between contestants from previous seasons of Dragula, with the winner returning for the fourth season of Dragula. Saint won the competition, earned a place as a contestant on season 4, and a cash prize of $20,000.

== Contestants ==
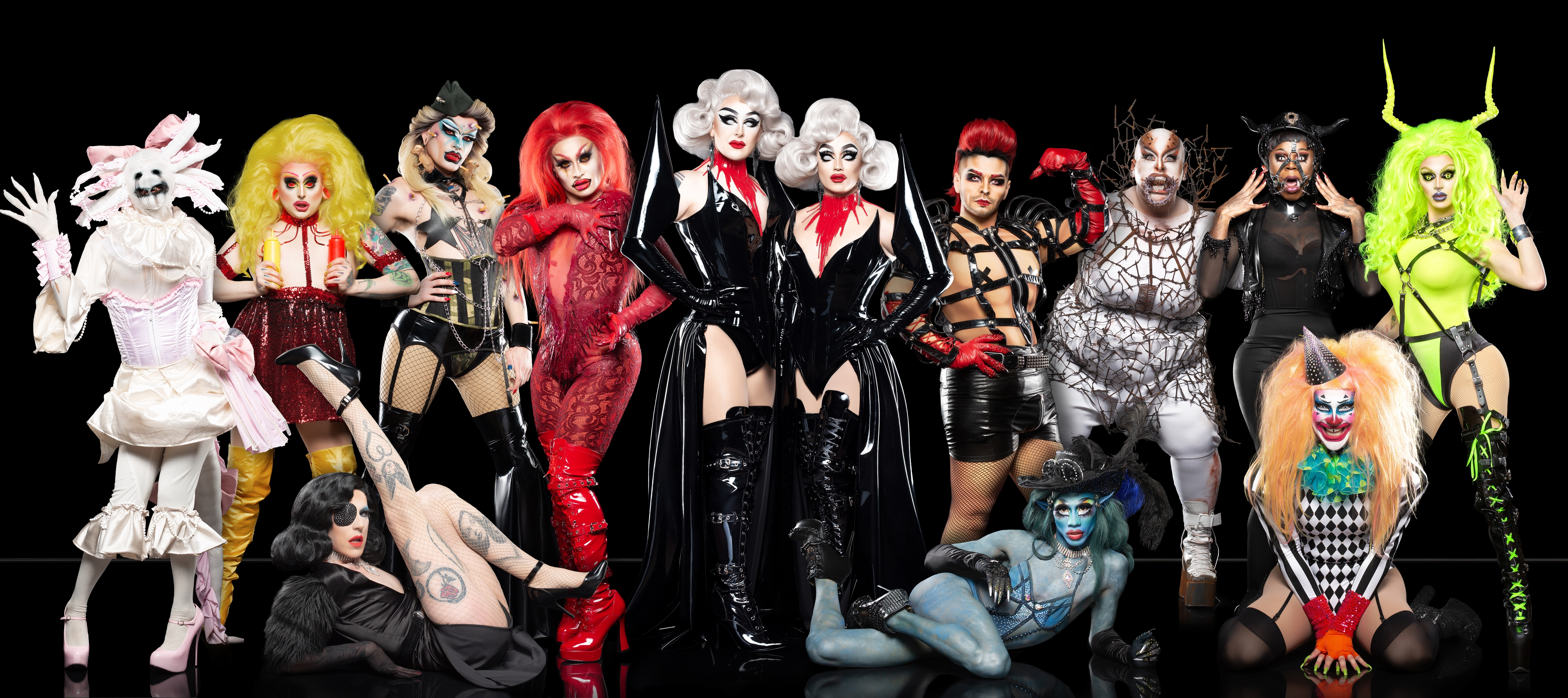
The Boulet Brothers and the cast of the third season of Dragula.

Contestants of The Boulet Brothers' Dragula season 3 and their backgrounds
Contestant	Age	Hometown	Outcome
Landon Cider	39	Long Beach, California	Winner
Dollya Black	23	Orlando, Florida	Runners-up
Priscilla Chambers	23	Asheville, North Carolina	Runners-up
Louisianna Purchase	42	Austin, Texas	4th place
Evah Destruction	27	Dallas, Texas	5th place
Maddelynn Hatter	37	Brooklyn, New York	6th place
Hollow Eve	36	San Francisco, California	7th place
Maxi Glamour	27	St. Louis, Missouri	8th place
Yovska	23	Toronto, Canada	9th place
St. Lucia (Note: Now known as Saint, she was referred to as St. Lucia on the show.)	25	Atlanta, Georgia	10th place
Violencia! (Note: Violencia Exclamation Point is referred to as Violencia! on the show.)	31	Boston, Massachusetts	11th place (Note: Violencia! quit the competition before the extermination.)

== Contestant progress ==
Legend:

Landon Cider won The Boulet Brothers' Dragula season 3.
Dollya Black and Priscilla Chambers were the runners-up.
WIN indicates the contestant won the challenge.
SAFE indicates that the contestant was declared safe by the judges.
KEY indicates that the contestant obtained a key with the power of granting herself immunity or nominating a fellow contestant for the extermination, choosing immunity.
BTM (Bottom) indicates that the contestant was up for extermination.
EXT (Exterminated) indicates that the contestant was exterminated.
QUIT indicates that Violencia! quit the competition.
Guest indicates the contestant returned as a guest.

Progress of contestants including placements in each episode
Contestant	Episode									
Contestant	1	2	3	4	5	6	7	8	9	10
Landon Cider	SAFE	WIN	SAFE	SAFE	SAFE	WIN	SAFE	WIN	Guest	Winner
Dollya Black	WIN	SAFE	SAFE	KEY	SAFE	SAFE	WIN	BTM	Guest	Runner-up
Priscilla Chambers	SAFE	SAFE	SAFE	SAFE	WIN	BTM	BTM	BTM	Guest	Runner-up
Louisianna Purchase	SAFE	SAFE	SAFE	SAFE	SAFE	SAFE	BTM	EXT	Guest	
Evah Destruction	SAFE	SAFE	WIN	WIN	BTM	SAFE	EXT	SAFE	Guest	
Maddelynn Hatter	SAFE	SAFE	BTM	BTM	SAFE	EXT			Guest	
Hollow Eve	SAFE	SAFE	BTM	SAFE	EXT				Guest	
Maxi Glamour	BTM	SAFE	SAFE	EXT					Guest	
Yovska	SAFE	BTM	EXT						Guest	
St. Lucia	SAFE	EXT							Guest	
Violencia!	QUIT								Guest	

== Exterminations ==
Legend:

The contestant was exterminated after their first time in the bottom.
The contestant was exterminated after their second time in the bottom.
The contestant was exterminated after their third time in the bottom.
The contestant was in the bottom two and quit the competition before the extermination.

Episode	Contestants			Challenge	Exterminated
1	Maxi Glamour	vs.	Violencia!	18,000 ft (5,500 m) sky dive	Violencia!
2	St. Lucia	vs.	Yovska	Consume a feast consisting of cow's organs and blood	St. Lucia
3	Hollow Eve vs. Maddelynn Hatter vs. Yovska			Get a tattoo chosen by another extermination competitor	Yovska
4	Maddelynn Hatter	vs.	Maxi Glamour	Get humiliated by your competitors as you plead your case	Maxi Glamour
5 (Note: In episode 5, all remaining competitors, except for the main challenge winner Priscilla Chambers, were asked to participate in the extermination, though it was specified beforehand that only Evah Destruction and Hollow Eve would be up for elimination.)	Evah Destruction	vs.	Hollow Eve	Blow a cockroach through a tube into the opposer's mouth	Hollow Eve
6	Maddelynn Hatter	vs.	Priscilla Chambers	Remove parts from a cadaver avoiding a 6,000 volt shock by an electric collar	Maddelynn Hatter
7	Evah Destruction vs. Louisianna Purchase vs. Priscilla Chambers			Staple as many dollar bills as possible to your body	Evah Destruction
8 (Note: In episode 8, all remaining competitors participated in the extermination, though it was specified beforehand that the main challenge winner Landon Cider was already through to the grand finale, while everyone else was up for elimination.)	Dollya Black vs. Louisianna Purchase vs. Priscilla Chambers			Walk through a haunted house avoiding traps in order to grab an invite to the Top 3	Louisianna Purchase

== Guest judges ==
Episode	Guest judges
1	Phi Phi O'Hara, drag entertainer Phil Jimenez, comic artist
2	Amanda Lepore, trans activist and model Bonnie Aarons, actress
3	Henry Rollins, musician, singer, and actor Peaches Christ, drag entertainer
4	Darren Stein, film director Michael Varrati, screenwriter
5	Biqtch Puddin', drag entertainer and winner of season 2 Felissa Rose, actress
6	Milly Shapiro, actress Paige Owens
7	Cig Neutron, visual effects artist and make-up artist Vander von Odd, drag entertainer and winner of season 1
8	Danielle Harris, actress Rachel True, actress

== Episode summary ==
Episode	Title	Original air date	Episode summary
1	The Lesser of Two Evils	August 27, 2019	Floor Show Challenge: Design an outfit worthy of being called a Super-villain. Floor Show Prize: $1,000 in heels from Fierce Queen; Floor Show Winner: Dollya Black Extermination Challenge: Complete an 18,000 foot skydive (while strapped to a diving instructor). Participants: Maxi Glamour and Violencia! Quit: Violencia!
2	Don't Suck	September 3, 2019	Floor Show Challenge: Design a vampire-themed outfit (complete with reveals), design a fan from Dirt Squirrel, and perform a live solo burlesque number. Floor Show Prize: $1,000 gift package of underwear from Dirt Squirrel; Floor Show Winner: Landon Cider Extermination Challenge: Consume a feast consisting of cow organs and cow's blood. Participants: St. Lucia and Yovska; Exterminated: St. Lucia
3	Drag Monsters of Rock	September 6, 2019	Floor Show Challenge: Compete in two rival bands in a live rock performance and present two looks inspired by punk rock and heavy metal (one look for the floor show and the second for the performance). Floor Show Prize: A custom latex gown from Bizarre Fetish Couture worth $1,000; Floor Show Winner: Evah Destruction Extermination Challenge: Receive a tattoo chosen by another competitor participating in the extermination. Participants: Hollow Eve, Maddelynn Hatter, and Yovska; Exterminated: Yovska
4	The Demons Blood	September 17, 2019	Floor Show Challenge: As Dungeon Masters, the Boulet Brothers rolled dice to assign a race and a class for each contestant. Inspired by Dungeons & Dragons, create a full fantasy look based on the assigned stats and then, while on location in a Renaissance village, act out a classic adventure campaign. Floor Show Prize: Queen's Feast Gala at Medieval Times worth over $1,000; Floor Show Winner: Evah Destruction Extermination Challenge: Beg and plead to not be exterminated while the safe competitors hurl rotten food and insults. Participants: Maddelynn Hatter and Maxi Glamour; Exterminated: Maxi Glamour
5	No Throw Aways, Not Recycled	September 17, 2019	Floor Show Challenge: Create a Trash Queen Couture look composed entirely of trash (while only using permanent markers and construction paper for make-up) and be interviewed by special fashion correspondent, Disasterina (contestant from season 2). Floor Show Prize: $1,000 prize package of Trixie Cosmetics by Trixie Mattel; Floor Show Winner: Priscilla Chambers Extermination Challenge: Use your mouth to blow a cockroach through a tube into the mouth of your competitor at the other end (while they try to do the same). Participants: All remaining contestants (except for the Floor Show winner) but only Evah Destruction and Hollow Eve were eligible for extermination Exterminated: Hollow Eve
6	The Operating Theatre	October 1, 2019	Floor Show Challenge: Create a look suitable for a hospital of horrors and then, while on location at an abandoned hospital, model the look for photographers from Alternative Press magazine. Floor Show Prize: A two-page spread in an upcoming issue of Alternative Press; Floor Show Winner: Landon Cider Extermination Challenge: Delicately remove body parts from a cadaver on a unique operating table built so that every slip of the hand or mistake results in 6,000 volts of electricity straight to a shock collar. Participants: Maddelynn Hatter and Priscilla Chambers; Exterminated: Maddelynn Hatter
7	Le Freak	October 7, 2019	Floor Show Challenge: Turn oddity into art by creating an unforgettable freak show fashion look complete with a showstopping circus sideshow act. As a second part to the challenge, style and incorporate a premium lace front wig using wigs provided by Dragula's official wig sponsor, Arda Wigs. Floor Show Prize: $500 in wigs courtesy of Arda Wigs; Floor Show Winner: Dollya Black Extermination Challenge: Staple as many dollar bills to their body as possible within sixty seconds. Participants: Evah Destruction, Louisianna Purchase, and Priscilla Chambers; Exterminated: Evah Destruction
8	Halloween Haunt	October 14, 2019	Floor Show Challenge: Reinvent a classic Halloween costume archetype and elevate the concept with the elements of glamour, filth and/or horror. In addition, carve a jack-o-lantern that accessorizes and accentuates the Halloween costume. Afterward, perform in a four way lip sync battle royale to "Dread" by Ritual Aesthetic. Floor Show Prize: $1,000 in custom corsetry from Misty Couture and a headlining spot at the Boulet Brothers' Los Angeles Halloween Ball 2019; Floor Show Winner: Landon Cider Extermination Challenge: Search through an abandoned haunt attraction for a hidden invite to the Top 3 while avoiding traps and gag actors. Participants: All contestants but only Dollya Black, Louisianna Purchase, and Priscilla Chambers were eligible for extermination Exterminated: Louisianna Purchase
9	Last Supper	October 22, 2019	The exterminated uglies are re-animated for the season 3 reunion to discuss controversies, rivalries, and everything in-between before the final 3 face off in the Grand Finale of Dragula.
10	The Grand Finale	October 29, 2019	Floor Show Challenge: Interpret and design three outfits and floor show performances based on the three principles of Dragula: Glamour, Filth and Horror. Floor Show Prize: The title of the World's Next Drag Supermonster, a crown & scepter from Fierce Drag Jewels, and $25,000; Floor Show Winner: Landon Cider
