= Bunnies on the Bayou =

American non-profit organization

- Status: active
- Frequency: annually
- Venue: Wortham Center Fish Plaza
- Locations: Houston, Texas
- Country: United States
- Years active: 1979–2019, 2021–

Bunnies on the Bayou is a 501(c)(3) organization which hosts an annual party and fundraising event each year on Easter Sunday. The organization is organized by and primarily serves members of the LGBT community of Houston, Texas, in the United States. According to its website, the organization's mission is to raise funds for "various charitable, educational and cultural programs that seek to improve the quality of life for individuals in the LGBTQ community and promotes education and awareness of individual human rights within greater Houston area. The fundraiser is one of Houston's largest outdoor events and has been called the city's" largest annual outdoor cocktail party".

== History ==
The event originated in 1979, when a group of friends hosted a birthday celebration on Easter at an apartment complex on Clay Street. News of the event spread; invitations were distributed and a sound system was installed the following year. During the HIV/AIDS pandemic of the 1980s, party organizers began charging "admission" in the form of food for local charitable organizations. Over time, the event continued to grow and admission evolved from food to monetary contributions. In the 1990s the group formally formed into a 501(c)(3) organization.

Bunnies on the Bayou has been held at Wortham Center Fish Plaza in downtown Houston since the 1990s. In 2022 and 2023 the event was held in Sesquicentennial Park.

With the COVID-19 pandemic scrapping the 2020 event, the 42nd was deferred to 2021. After a two-year break due to the pandemic, the event was once again held in 2022.

== Events ==
Bunnies on the Bayou is the organization's largest annual event, which is a large outdoor party held on Easter Sunday. The event typically features live music and DJs as well as drag performances. Many attendees wear costumes and bunny ears. Bunnies on the Bayou also host other events throughout the year including Snow Bunnies in the winter, masquerade themed Bunnies in Heat, Honey Bunnies, Basket Bash, and an annual VIP Party.

== Fundraising ==
Funds raised by Bunnies on the Bayou is distributed to charities in Houston which serve "underrepresented communities." Beneficiaries have included AIDS Foundation Houston, Montrose Grace Place, Hatch Youth, and others. Since its inception, the fundraiser has raised more than $1.7 million for local charities.
