= Biqtch Puddin' =

American drag performer and recording artist

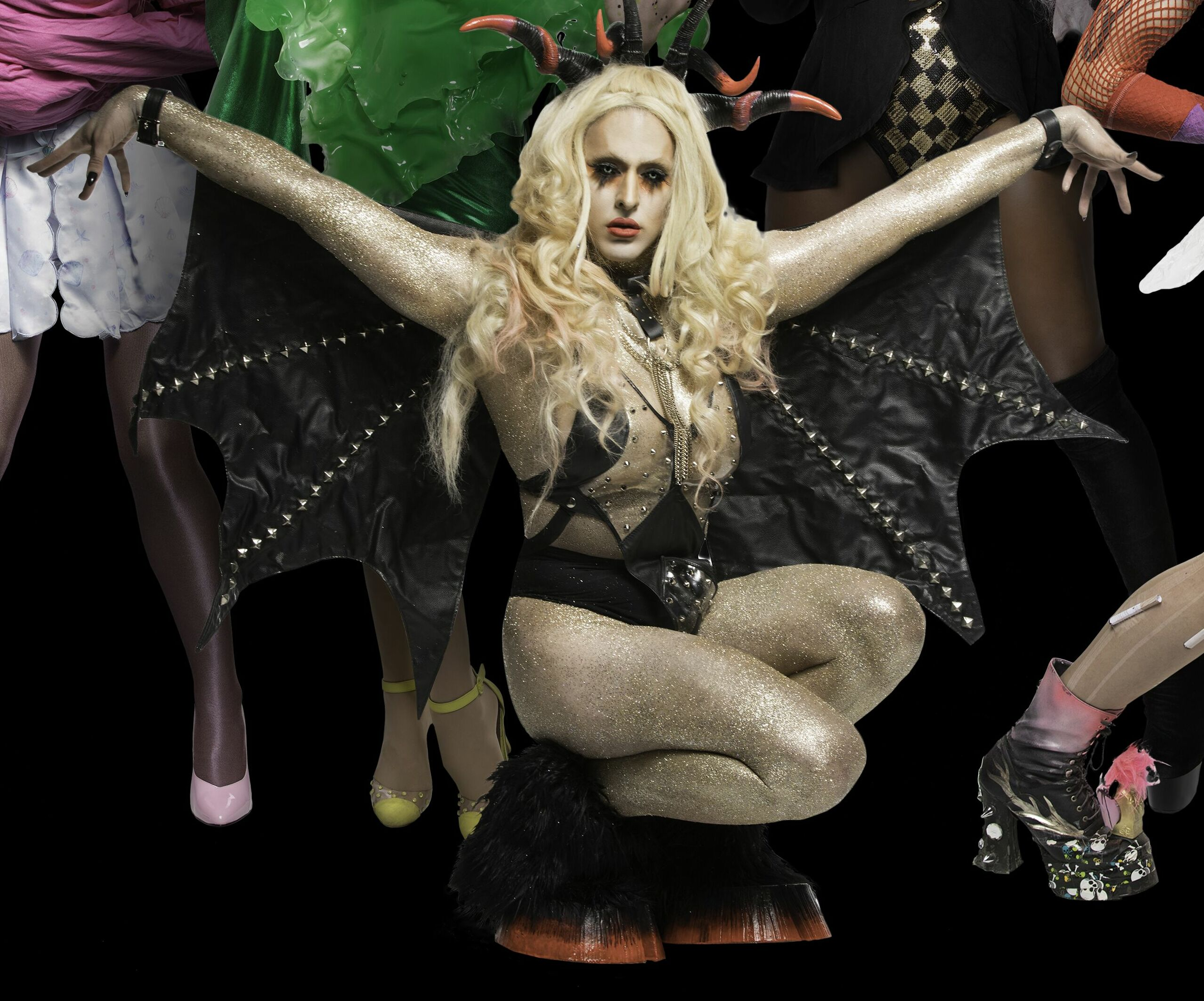
- Biqtch Puddin' in promotional artwork for season 2 of The Boulet Brothers' Dragula, 2017
- Born: Steven Glen Diehl; September 23, 1991 (age 34); Jacksonville, Florida, U.S.
- Other name: Biqtch Puddin'
- Occupations: Drag performer, reality television personality
- Years active: 2016–present
- Known for: The Boulet Brothers' Dragula (season 2); Drag Me to Dinner

Steven Glen Diehl, better known by the stage name Biqtch Puddin' (born 23 September 1991), is an American drag performer based in Los Angeles, California. Biqtch Puddin' is best known for winning season two of The Boulet Brothers' Dragula and her digital drag shows on Twitch. Biqtch Puddin' was also a contestant on Drag Me to Dinner.

== Early life and career ==
Biqtch Puddin's first drag performance was for a charity event while attending the Savannah College of Art and Design in Savannah, Georgia for performance arts. Biqtch's stage name originates from Bitch Pudding, a character from an Adult Swim sketch parodying Strawberry Shortcake. Their drag persona was inspired by characters in video games such as Tekken 2, Mortal Kombat, Final Fight and Street Fighter. Biqtch claims Sasha Colby, Celeste Holmes, and Kiara as their "drag mothers". While performing in Savannah, Biqtch co-founded the House of Gunt.

Biqtch Puddin' competed on season 2 of The Boulet Brothers' Dragula in 2018, eventually winning against James Majesty and Victoria Black to be crowned the "World's Next Drag Supermonster". During the COVID-19 pandemic in 2020, they began hosting digital drag shows on Twitch.

They appeared on Drag Me to Dinner in 2023 and Drag House Rules in 2025. They formerly worked at Cartoon Network.

== Personal life ==
Diehl was raised as a Navy brat, frequently moving as a child. They grew up in Chesapeake, Virginia, among other locations. Biqtch Puddin' is currently living in Los Angeles, having previously been based in Atlanta, Georgia.

== Filmography ==
=== Television ===
- The Boulet Brothers' Dragula (season 2)
- Drag Me to Dinner (2023)
- Drag House Rules (2025)
