= Landon Cider =

American drag king, actor and host

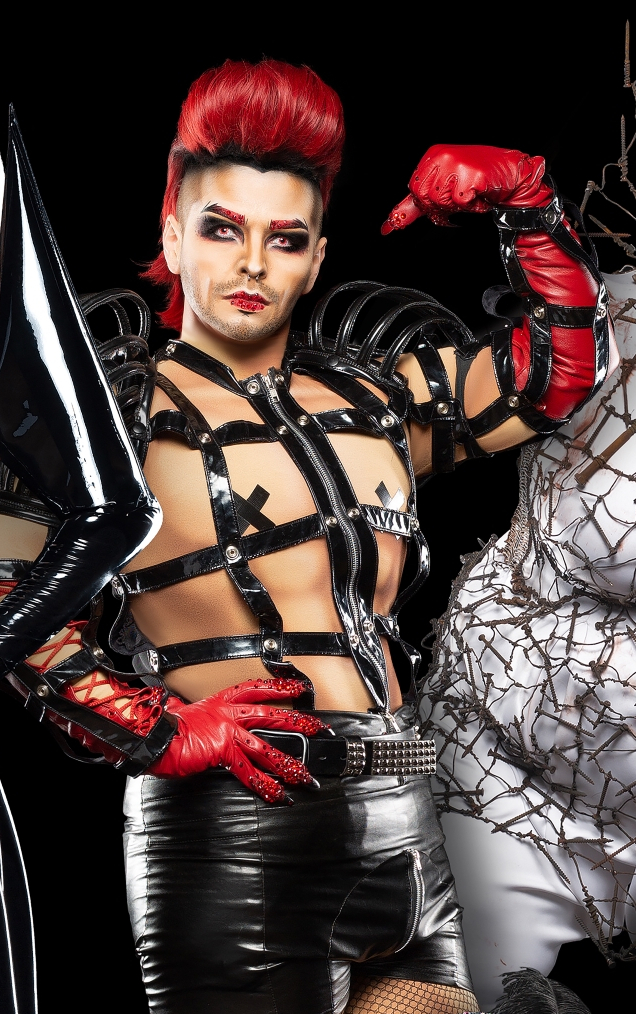
- Landon Cider in promotional artwork for season 3 of The Boulet Brothers' Dragula, 2019
- Born: Kristine Bellaluna; Los Angeles, California, U.S.
- Occupations: Drag king, actor, host
- Spouse: Gabi
- Website: landoncider.com

Landon Cider is the stage name of Kristine Bellaluna, an American drag king, actor, and host. Landon Cider won season 3 of The Boulet Brothers' Dragula and was crowned the "World's Next Drag Supermonster".

== Early life and background ==
Kristine Bellaluna was born and raised in Los Angeles. She began her career as a theatre actor in Southern California. She took a hiatus from theatre following the death of her mother, and later became interested in drag after attending drag shows at the Starlette Revue.

== Career ==
Bellaluna's drag persona is Landon Cider. Landon Cider began his career performing in the Southern California drag circuit, where he became one of the more well known drag kings. He performs Drag King Explosion at Hamburger Mary's. He is the master of ceremonies for the annual Los Angeles event series Bent, which celebrates drag and queer identities. Landon Cider was the main focus of Nicole Miyahara's 2013 documentary The Making of a King.

Landon Cider began working with World of Wonder in 2016 and appeared on James St. James' Transformations. He later hosted the first King Panel at DragCon. Landon Cider wrote an op-ed for The Advocate, criticizing RuPaul's position that females performing drag does not have the irony that males performing drag does.

In 2019, Landon Cider joined the cast of season 3 of The Boulet Brothers' Dragula, becoming the first drag king to appear on an American drag competition show. He won the season and was crowned the "World's Next Drag Supermonster" by the Boulet Brothers. Landon Cider was also a judge on Alaska Thunderfuck's "Drag Queen of the Year Pageant" that year. He was listed on Pride Magazine's "11 Drag Kings You Should Definitely Know About". In February 2020, Landon Cider hosted Pride Union's 18th Annual Drag Show Finals with Manila Luzon.

Landon Cider hosts Socially Distant, a digital drag livestream. The show aired on April 2, 2020, and featured drag artists such as Hugo Grrrl and Charli Deville. He was featured on the HBO reality television show We're Here. Landon Cider appeared in the 2020 book Rainbow Revolutions by Magnus Hastings. In September 2022, it was announced that Landon Cider would be starring in the Hulu original variety special Huluween Dragstravaganza, which aired on October 1, 2022. He appears as a regular judge in the second season of the Canadian drag competition series Call Me Mother. Landon Cider was then announced as a rotating judge for the fifth season of Dragula.

== Personal life ==
Bellaluna is a survivor of oral cancer. She is a lesbian, and has a wife named Gabi.

In an interview with Gay Times, Landon Cider cited male impersonator Vesta Tilley, Australian drag king Sexy Galexy and lesbian icon Stormé DeLarverie as inspirations.

== Filmography ==
=== Film ===
Year	Title	Role	Notes
2013	The Making of a King	Himself	Documentary

=== Television ===
Year	Title	Role	Notes
2019	The Boulet Brothers' Dragula	Contestant	Season 3, Winner (10 episodes)
2020	We're Here	Himself	Guest (Season 1, episode 5)
2021	The Boulet Brothers' Dragula	Himself	Guest judge (Season 4, episode 6)
2022	Huluween Dragstravaganza	Himself	Variety special (1 episode)
2022	Call Me Mother	Judge	Season 2 (9 episodes)
2023	The Boulet Brothers' Dragula	Judge	Season 5
2025	King of Drag	Guest judge	Season 1

=== Web series ===
Year	Title	Role	Notes
2015 - 2016	Transformations: with James St. James	Himself	Episode 94, Episode 137 (featured) & Episode138
2020	Socially Distant	Himself (host)	
2024	Give It To Me Straight	Himself, Maddy Morphosis	Episodes 38 & Bonus Episode
