= The Boulet Brothers' Dragula season 2 =

Second season of 'The Boulet Brothers' Dragula'

The Boulet Brothers' Dragula
- Season 2
- Promotional poster for season two
- Hosted by: The Boulet Brothers
- Judges: Dracmorda Boulet; Swanthula Boulet
- No. of contestants: 10
- Winner: Biqtch Puddin'
- Runners-up: James Majesty; Victoria Elizabeth Black
- No. of episodes: 10

Release
- Original network: Amazon Prime (United States/United Kingdom); OutTV (Canada); SBS Viceland (Australia); WOW Presents Plus (International)
- Original release: 31 October 2017 – 16 January 2018

Season chronology
- ← Previous; Season 1 Next → Season 3

The second season of The Boulet Brothers' Dragula premiered on October 31, 2017, and concluded on January 16, 2018. The competition was broadcast on Amazon Prime in the United States and United Kingdom, OUTtv in Canada, SBS Viceland in Australia and WOW Presents Plus streaming service in worldwide. The series featured 10 contenstants, from all over the United States, competing for the title of World's Next Drag Supermonster and a cash prize of $10,000.

The winner of the second season of The Boulet Brothers' Dragula was Biqtch Puddin', with James Majesty and Victoria Elizabeth Black as the runner-up. Dahli, Kendra Onixxx and Victoria Elizabeth Black returned later to compete in The Boulet Brothers' Dragula: Resurrection, a competition between contestants from previous seasons of Dragula, with the winner returning for the fourth season of Dragula. Saint won the competition and returned for the fourth season as well as runner up Dahli, with Dahli winning the 4th season. In 2022, Victoria Elizabeth Black won The Boulet Brothers' Dragula: Titans, a full season of returning cast members.

== Contestants ==
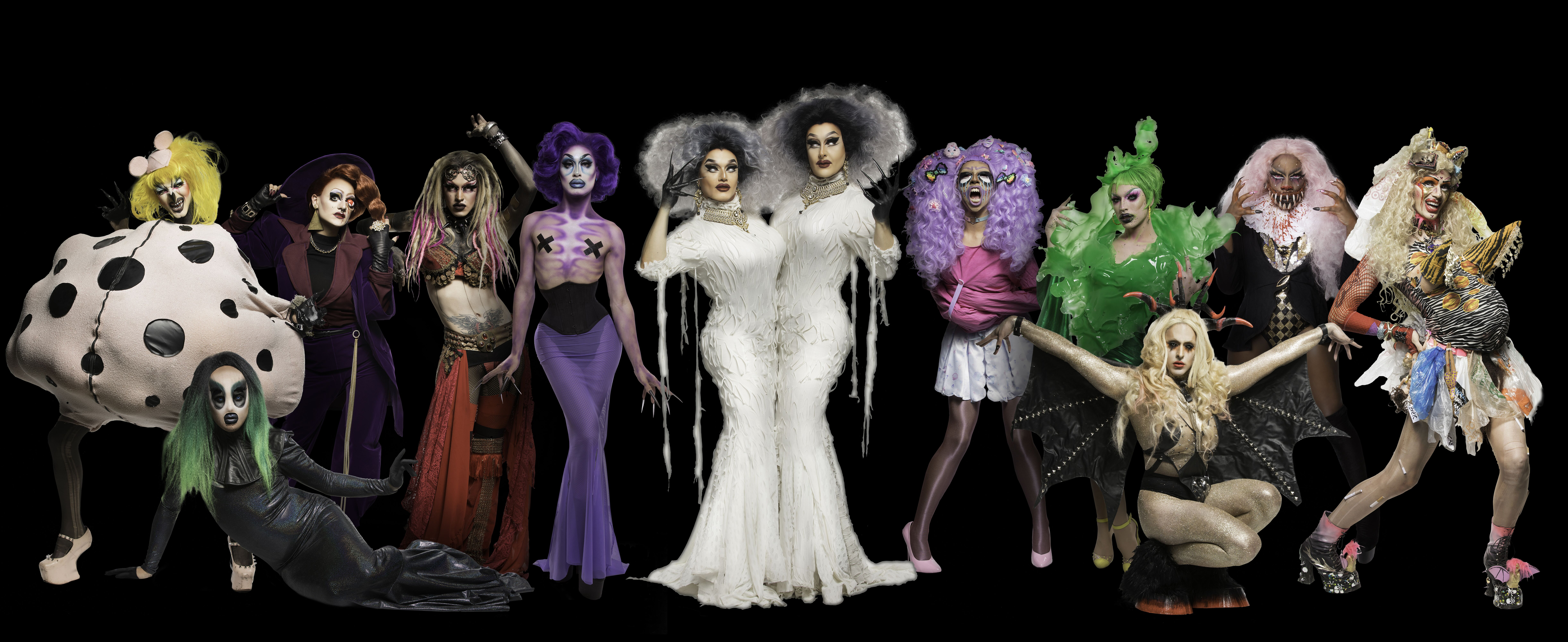
The Boulet Brothers and the cast of the second season of Dragula.

Contestants of The Boulet Brothers' Dragula season 2 and their backgrounds
Contestant	Age	Hometown	Outcome
Biqtch Puddin'	26	Atlanta, Georgia	Winner
James Majesty	23	Seattle, Washington	Runners-up
Victoria Elizabeth Black	23	Orlando, Florida	Runners-up
Abhora	27	Miami, Florida	4th place
Disasterina	47	Los Angeles, California	5th place
Erika Klash	33	San Francisco, California	6th place
Dahli (Note: The Dahli is referred to as Dahli on the show.)	26	Phoenix, Arizona	7th place
Kendra Onixxx	32	Pomona, California	8th place
Monikkie Shame	28	Seattle, Washington	9th place
Felony Dodger	29	Los Angeles, California	10th place

== Contestant progress ==
Legend:

Biqtch Puddin' won The Boulet Brothers' Dragula season 2.
James Majesty and Victoria Elizabeth Black were the runners-up.
WIN indicates that the contestant won the challenge.
WUE (Winner up for elimination) indicates that the contestant won the challenge, but was still up for extermination.
SAFE indicates that the contestant was declared safe by the judges.
BTM (Bottom) indicates that the contestant was up for extermination.
EXT (Exterminated) indicates that the contestant was exterminated.
Guest indicates the contestant returned as a guest.

Contestants progress with placements in each episode
Contestant	Episode								
Contestant	1	2	3	4	5	6	8	9	10
Biqtch Puddin'	SAFE	BTM	WIN	SAFE	WIN	SAFE	SAFE	Guest	Winner
James Majesty	WIN	BTM	SAFE	WIN	SAFE	BTM	WIN	Guest	Runner-up
Victoria Elizabeth Black	SAFE	WIN	BTM	SAFE	BTM	SAFE	SAFE	Guest	Runner-up
Abhora	SAFE	SAFE	SAFE	BTM	BTM	WUE	EXT	Guest	
Disasterina	SAFE	BTM	SAFE	SAFE	SAFE	EXT		Guest	
Erika Klash	BTM	BTM	SAFE	BTM	EXT			Guest	
Dahli	SAFE	SAFE	SAFE	EXT				Guest	
Kendra Onixxx	SAFE	BTM	EXT					Guest	
Monikkie Shame	BTM	EXT						Guest	
Felony Dodger	EXT							Guest	

== Exterminations ==
The contestant was exterminated after their first time in the bottom.
The contestant was exterminated after their second time in the bottom.
The contestant was exterminated after their fourth time in the bottom.
The contestant was exterminated after the final challenge of the season.

Episode	Contestants			Challenge	Exterminated
1	Erika Klash vs. Felony Dodger vs. Monikkie Shame			See who can be pierced by the most body modification needles	Felony Dodger
2	Disasterina	vs.	Erika Klash	Close-range paintball duel	Monikkie Shame
2	James Majesty	vs.	Kendra Onixxx	Close-range paintball duel	Monikkie Shame
2	Biqtch Puddin'	vs.	Monikkie Shame	Close-range paintball duel	Monikkie Shame
3	Kendra Onixxx	vs.	Victoria Elizabeth Black	Receive the worst tattoo you can think of	Kendra Onixxx
4	Abhora vs. Dahli vs. Erika Klash			Consume a three course meal based on the most alien food	Dahli
5	Abhora vs. Erika Klash vs. Victoria Elizabeth Black			Answer questions with a polygraph machine hooked on their bodies	Erika Klash
6	Abhora vs. Disasterina vs. James Majesty			Submerge their feet in a bucket full of ice for half an hour	Disasterina
8 (Note: In this episode all contestants had to compete in the extermination.)	James Majesty	vs.	Victoria Elizabeth Black	Fight in the Wasteland Weekend Thunderdome	Abhora
8	Abhora	vs.	Biqtch Puddin'	Fight in the Wasteland Weekend Thunderdome	Abhora

== Guest judges ==
Episode	Guest Judges
1	Gage Munster, make-up artist Willam, drag entertainer and actor
2	Miss Kitty
3	Magnus Hastings, photographer Michael Schmidt
4	Alaska Thunderfuck, drag entertainer and recording artist Heklina, drag entertainer
5	Miss Coco Peru, drag entertainer, actor, and comedian Peaches Christ, drag entertainer
6	BibleGirl, drag entertainer and internet personality Darren Stein, film director
7	Vander von Odd, drag entertainer and winner of season 1
8	Vander von Odd, drag entertainer and winner of season 1

== Episode summary ==
Episode	Title	Original airdate	Episode summary
1	Cenobites	October 31, 2017	Floor Show Challenge: Inspired by their own drag style, design a Cenobites outfit Floor Show Winner: James Majesty Extermination Challenge: Competing with one another to see who can be pierced by the most body modification needles, with the contestant who received the fewest piercings receiving extermination Participants: Erika Klash, Felony Dodger, and Monikkie Shame; Exterminated: Felony Dodger
2	Ghost Town Ghouls	November 7, 2017	Floor Show Challenge: Design an outfit based on the ghosts of the Old West; Floor Show Winner: Victoria Elizabeth Black Extermination Challenge: Close-range paintball duel Participants: Biqtch Puddin', Disasterina, Erika Klash, James Majesty, Kendra Onixxx, and Monikkie Shame; Exterminated: Monikkie Shame
3	Shock Rock and Metal	November 14, 2017	Floor Show Challenge: Present a look inspired by punk rock and heavy metal and perform on the stage as a band Floor Show Winner: Biqtch Puddin' Extermination Challenge: Receive the worst tattoo you can think of Participants: Kendra Onixxx and Victoria Elizabeth Black; Exterminated: Kendra Onixxx
4	Sci-Fi Babes	November 21, 2017	Floor Show Challenge: Create an alien look and give birth to a baby based on that look Floor Show Prize: A set of cosmetics from Obsessive Compulsive Cosmetics; Floor Show Winner: James Majesty Extermination Challenge: Consume a three course meal based on the most alien food Participants: Abhora, Dahli, and Erika Klash; Exterminated: Dahli
5	Scream Queens	November 28, 2017	Floor Show Challenge: Create a "scream queen/pretty" look and act in a horror movie Floor Show Winner: Biqtch Puddin' Extermination Challenge: Answer questions with a polygraph machine hooked on their bodies Participants: Abhora, Erika Klash, and Victoria Elizabeth Black; Exterminated: Erika Klash
6	Gothic Brides	December 5, 2017	Floor Show Challenge: Create a gothic bride, prepare a lip sync performance of Switchblade Symphony's song "Gutter Glitter" and customize a fan Floor Show Winner: Abhora Extermination Challenge: Submerge their feet in a bucket full of ice for half an hour Participants: Abhora, Disasterina, and James Majesty; Exterminated: Disasterina
7	Welcome to Wasteland (Part 1)	December 12, 2017	Floor Show Challenge: Take part in a photoshoot in the desert near 100 °F (38 °C) temperatures
8	Welcome to Wasteland (Part 2)	December 19, 2017	Floor Show Challenge: Perform as a group at Wasteland Weekend with a theme for the performance Floor Show Winner: James Majesty Extermination Challenge: Fight in the Wasteland Weekend Thunderdome; Participants: All remaining contestants Exterminated: Abhora
9	Last Supper	January 9, 2018	The entire cast reunites to discuss the season
10	Finale	January 16, 2018	Floor Show Challenge: Interpret and design three outfits with the principles of DRAGULA: Drag, Glamour, Filth and Horror; Floor Show Prize: $10,000 and the title of World's Next Drag Supermonster; Floor Show Winner: Biqtch Puddin'
