= D'Arcy Drollinger =

American actor, writer, musician, director, producer & choreographer

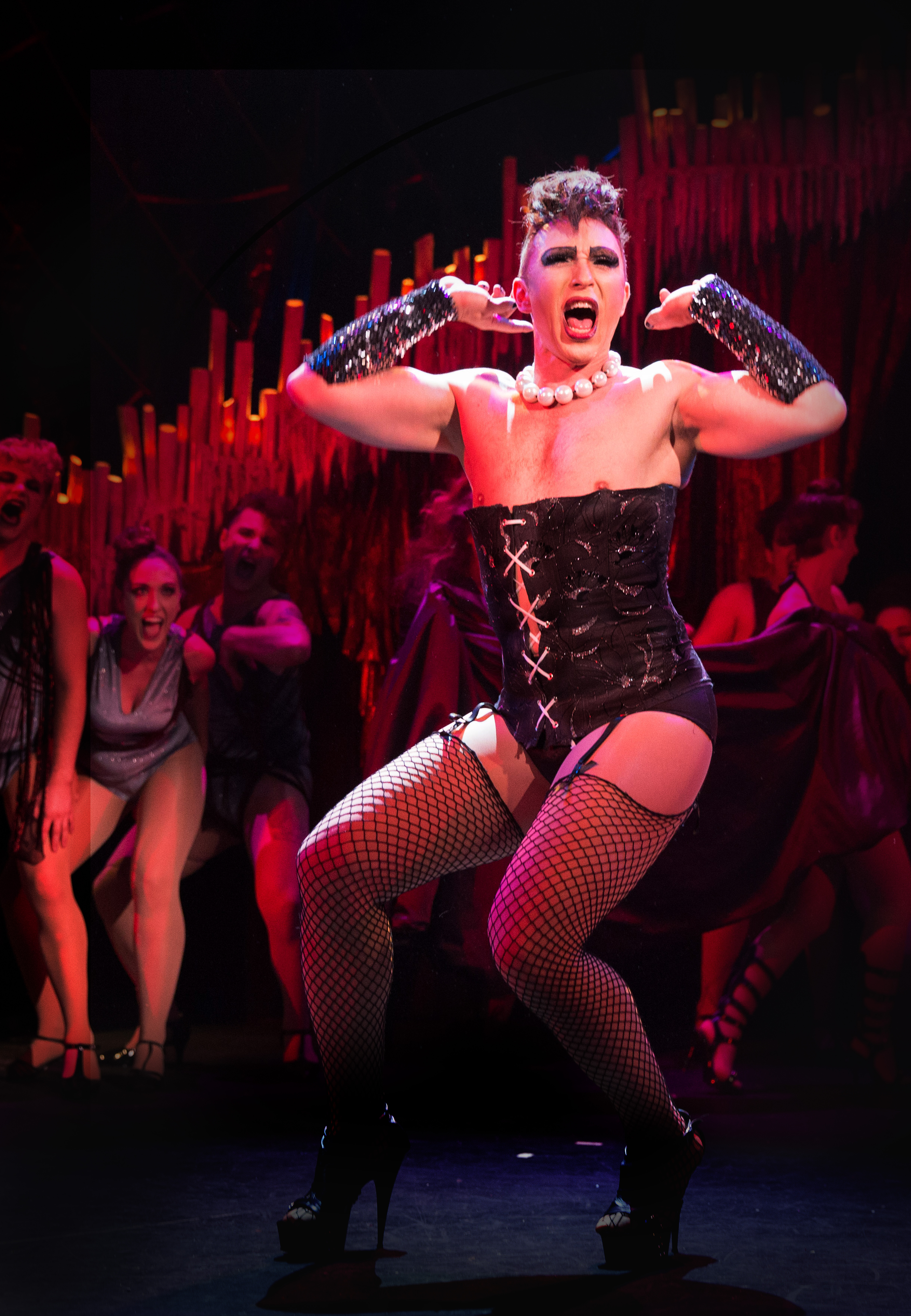
- Drollinger as Frank-N-Furter in Ray of Light's 2015 production of The Rocky Horror Show
- Born: January 17, 1969 (age 57); San Francisco, California, U.S.
- Occupations: Writer; actor; producer; director; choreographer
- Years active: 1988–present
- Website: www.darcydrollinger.com

D'Arcy Drollinger (born January 17, 1969) is an American actor, writer, musician, director, producer & choreographer known for his high-camp / vaudeville-style stage productions and films that combine slapstick, farce and often drag. He was a founding member of the post-punk art band Enrique. He is the owner of the San Francisco nightclub Oasis. Drollinger is also the creator of the dance-fitness brand, Sexitude. D'Arcy was appointed as the first San Francisco Drag Laureate in 2023. The position of its kind in the world.

== Career ==
=== Film ===
D'Arcy wrote, directed and starred in his first feature film in 2020, based on original play, Shit & Champagne. The screenplay brings many of the [stage]show's characters, storyline and jokes largely intact to the cinematic version, with Drollinger playing stripper Champagne White. The comedy is a tribute to female empowerment and the low-budget exploitation films of the 1970s. Drollinger second feature film Lady Champagne, previously title Champagne White and the Temple of Poon - the sequel to Shit & Champagne - is currently receiving rave reviews as it makes its rounds in the festival circuit and is anticipated to be releases theatrically in 2027.

=== The Oasis ===
The Oasis, a theater and cabaret nightclub located in San Francisco's SOMA district, hosted a grand opening event on New Year's Eve day 2014. D'Arcy and business partners, including drag personality, Heklina, signed a deal to purchase the former Oasis nightclub in October 2014. The nightclub's diverse programming features drag stars, cabaret and performing artists, live musical acts, and DJs. Drollinger went on to become sole owner, reopening Oasis after the COVID pandemic lockdowns ended, in June 2021.

In July, 2025, the Oasis was announced to be closing by the end of 2025. In an interview, Drollinger explained that “we’ve been struggling like a lot of other venues. Our margins are razor thin. I’ve had to subsidize the club every month to be able to make it through. Those resources are gone, I’ve cashed in the majority of my retirement account to keep this going.” But at the 11th hour, six days before the scheduled closure, a regular at Oasis and his philonthropic family gave a substantial gift to Oasis Arts, the non-profit arm of Oasis, allowing them to not only stay open but also to purchase the building. In an interview Drollinger is quoted as saying, “It's a Christmas miracle moment that I only dreamed could happen.”

=== Theatrical productions ===
Drollinger has a distinct style as a director, it is a mix of heightened slapstick with almost a commedia dell'arte-flavored rhythm and a sharp sense of timing, but all favored with the real truth of experience.

— Cindy Goldfield, SF Chronicle

In 1993, Drollinger's first full-length musical, The Cereal Killers was produced at the Artful circle Theater in San Francisco. The production included many members of Enrique and was directed by Charles Herman-Wurmfeld. Drollinger and Wurmfeld went on to collaborate on two other rock musicals, The Possession of Mrs. Jones and Suburbia 3000. Drollinger mounted the long-running cult hit, Above and Beyond the Valley of the Ultra Showgirls in 1997 before moving to New York City in 1998. While living in Manhattan, Drollinger wrote and produced Pink Elephants, Scalpel! and Shit & Champagne, in which he also starred. After returning to San Francisco in 2011, Project: Lohan, Mr. Irresistible, were written. At the same time Drollinger began producing and directing live parodies of television sitcoms with long time friend and drag star, Heklina. After the venue they had been performing in was sold they decided to open Oasis, their own performance venue. After opening Oasis Drollinger wrote and starred in two sequels to Shit & Champagne, Champagne White and The Temple of Poon and Disastrous. Followed by the 1980s soap opera spoof, Bitch Slap.

=== Sexitude ===
Sexitude is an ongoing body-positive, sex-positive dance/fitness program created by Drollinger in 2011 in San Francisco, California. Drollinger taught the first class at the Academy of Ballet on August 7, 2011, as he desired as class that would be "fun, relaxed, and a good workout, both physically and mentally." Since then, Sexitude classes have happened in local San Francisco area dance schools such as Dance Mission, City Dance and ODC. As a performance group, Sexitude has participated in number of performances in the San Francisco Area, including Daytime Realness at El Rio, the Castro Theatre, and the Main Stage of San Francisco Pride. The group has worked with Drollinger as a professional drag queen as well as provided performances for programs organized by Peaches Christ.

=== San Francisco Drag Laureate ===
On May 18, 2023, Drollinger was announced as the inaugural San Francisco Drag Laureate. In November 2022, the Mayor's office announced the drag laureate program and offered open applications. Advertised as the first-ever position of its kind, the role is to serve as an ambassador for San Francisco's LGBTQ+, arts, nightlife, and entertainment communities. Drollinger was one of five applicants for the post who were recommended to the mayor by a selection committee tasked with reviewing all 16 people who had applied. Mayor London Breed called Drollinger a "bright star in San Francisco" for his advocacy and elevation of the city's drag community. "My goals are to make San Francisco sparkle. I think drag performers bring a lot of sparkle and humor and glamor and silliness to the world. I think that is part of why drag is so successful," Drollinger said.

=== Enrique ===
In 1988, while attending San Francisco State University, Drollinger and artist Jason Mecier formed the performance art band, Enrique. The groups comedic stage antics and often twisted take on 1970s TV nostalgia, landed their first gig opening up for the Average White band at The Kennel Club in San Francisco. The over-the-top stage productions won them a loyal San Francisco following from the late 1980s to mid 1990s.

==== Plays/musicals ====
- The Cereal Killers (1993)
- The Possession of Mrs. Jones (1996)
- Suburbia 3000 (1997)
- Above and Beyond the Valley of the Ultra Showgirls (1997/2003/2016/2017)
- Pink Elephants (2000)
- Scalpel! (2003/2010)
- Shit & Champagne (2006/2014/2015)
- Project: Lohan (2012)
- Mr. Irresistible (2014)
- Champagne White and the Temple of Poon (2015)
- Disastrous! (2016)
- B*tch Slap! (2017)

==== Parody adaptations (stage) ====
- Designing Women
- Friends
- Golden Girls
- Roseanne
- Sex and the City
- Star Trek
- Three's Company
- Buffy the Vampire Slayer

==== Films ====
- Shit & Champagne (2020)
- Lady Champagne (2026)
