= Darren Stein =

American filmmaker (born 1971)

- Born: December 24, 1971 (age 54); Los Angeles, California, U.S.
- Education: New York University
- Occupations: Film director, producer, screenwriter
- Years active: 1988–present

Darren Stein (born December 24, 1971) is an American film director, screenwriter, and film producer who grew up in Los Angeles's San Fernando Valley. Among his works include the documentary Put the Camera on Me, the 2010 horror comedy All About Evil, and the satirical major motion picture Jawbreaker, which was deemed a "cult classic" by the New York Post.

== Early life and education ==
Stein was born and raised in Encino, California. His father worked with his grandparents at a film lab and post-production company called Crest National in Hollywood. At a young age, Stein started making films with his friends in his neighborhood. He graduated from Harvard School for Boys (now known as Harvard-Westlake) in 1989 and later received his B.A. in film studies from New York University through the Tisch School of the Arts.

== Career ==
=== Late 1990s ===
Stein's first feature was Sparkler, a film about a newly single woman in Victorville, California, who crosses paths with three young men on a road trip to Las Vegas. Stein co-wrote and directed the film which featured Park Overall, Jamie Kennedy, Freddie Prinze Jr., Grace Zabriskie, and Veronica Cartwright. The film premiered at the Hamptons Film Festival.

Stein's second feature, Jawbreaker, premiered at the 1999 Sundance Film Festival and was nominated for the MTV Movie Award for “Best Villain”. The dark comedy about three teenage girls who accidentally kill their best friend via a birthday prank gone awry had a wide release in theaters through Tristar Pictures. The film's stars — Rose McGowan, Julie Benz, and Rebecca Gayheart — reunited at 90s Con in March 2023.

=== 2001–2004 ===
Stein's third feature, Put the Camera on Me, premiered at Outfest in July 2003. The documentary takes viewers behind the scenes of the movies Stein made with his neighborhood friends on his Encino cul-de-sac in the 1980s. Stein co-directed and co-produced the film with Adam Shell. The project was released on DVD through Wellspring/Genius Entertainment.

=== 2005–2008 ===
Stein executive-produced Cam Archer’s Wild Tigers I Have Known, which premiered at the 2005 Sundance Film Festival.

=== 2009–2015 ===
In 2010, Stein produced All About Evil, a horror comedy starring Natasha Lyonne, Thomas Dekker, Cassandra Peterson, Noah Segan, and Jack Donner. The film is written and directed by Joshua Grannell (also known as the drag queen Peaches Christ). All About Evil premiered at the San Francisco International Film Festival. It was released on Blu-Ray through Severin in 2022.

Stein wrote the book for Jawbreaker the Musical, with music and lyrics by Jeff Thomson and Jordan Mann. The stage musical had a one-night showing on July 29, 2010, in Los Angeles, featuring Jenna Leigh Green, Eden Espinosa, Shoshana Bean, and Megan Hilty. The show also had a reading in New York City featuring Elizabeth Gillies, Jojo, and Diana Degarmo.

Stein directed and produced the 2013 film G.B.F. (Gay Best Friend), a teen comedy starring Michael J. Willett, Paul Iacono, Sasha Pieterse, Andrea Bowen, Xosha Roquemore, Molly Tarlov, Evanna Lynch, Joanna "JoJo" Levesque, and Megan Mullally. The film premiered at the 2013 Tribeca Film Festival and was released theatrically on January 17, 2014, by Vertical Entertainment. G.B.F. focuses on closeted gay high school students Tanner and Brent. When Tanner is outed, he is picked up by the cool girls and begins to surpass still-closeted Brent in popularity.

Stein's 2013 fashion film for Alexander Wang was voted one of the "Top Ten Fashion Films of the Season" by Business of Fashion.

Stein was the writer of Seeds of Yesterday (2015), based on the book by V.C. Andrews for Lifetime starring Sammi Hanratty, James Maslow, Jason Lewis, and Rachel Carpani. It was directed by Shawn Ku.

=== 2016–present ===
Stein has appeared as a guest judge on six seasons of The Boulet Brothers’ Dragula.

He has directed music videos for Deap Vally (featuring Trixie Mattel), The Haunt (featuring Vander Von Odd), and '90s electropop band Dirty Sanchez.

== Personal life ==
Stein is openly gay.

== Filmography ==
Year	Title	Genre	Role	Notes
1988	Aviel	Short film		Director and writer
1997	Sparkler	Film		Director and writer
1999	Jawbreaker	Film		Director and writer
2003	Put the Camera on Me	Documentary	Himself	Director, cinematographer, editor, producer and writer
2006	Wild Tigers I Have Known	Film		Executive producer
2007	Color Me Olsen	Short film		Director, producer and writer
2010	All About Evil	Film		Producer
2013	G.B.F.	Film		Director and producer
2014	Hey Qween!	Web series	Himself	Guest (1 episode: Paul Iacono & Darren Stein)
2016-2024	The Boulet Brothers' Dragula	TV	Himself	Guest judge (6 episodes: Season 1, episode 1; Season 2, episode 6; Season 3, episode 4; Season 4, episode 1; Season 5, episode 7; Season 6, episode 5)
2017	Do the Voice	TV		Director and executive producer (1 episode)
2022	The Boulet Brothers' Dragula: Titans	TV	Himself	Producer (10 episodes); Guest judge (Episode 3)
