= Victoria Theatre, San Francisco =

Victoria Theatre Brown's Opera House El Teatro Victoria New Follies Burlesk
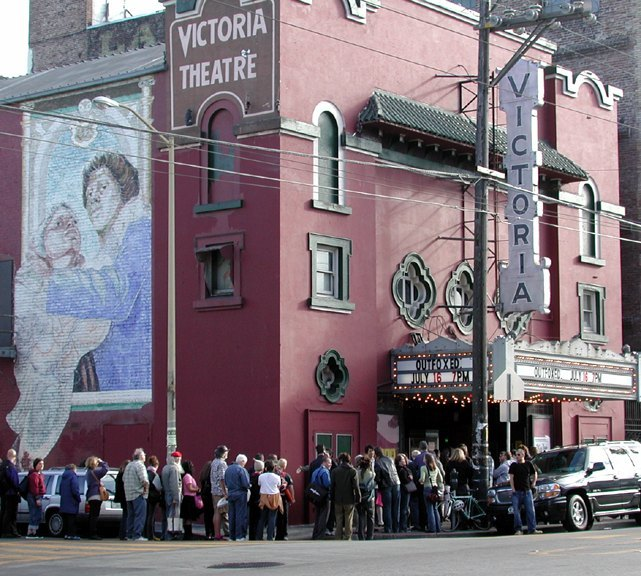
- San Francisco Victoria Theatre showing Outfoxed (July 16, 2004)
- Location: 2961-16th Street, San Francisco, California, U.S.
- Coordinates: 37°45′54.06″N 122°25′7.95″W
- Built: 1908; 117 years ago

San Francisco Designated Landmark
- Designated: March 3, 1996
- Reference no.: 215

Victoria Theatre is a 480-seat theater in San Francisco's Mission District. The theater is located at 2961-16th Street (at Capp Street) in San Francisco, California and presents plays, live concerts, film festivals, musicals, and performances. It is a San Francisco Designated Landmark (no. 215), since 1996.

== History ==
The Victoria Theatre was originally built in 1908 as Brown's Opera House, showing vaudeville and motion pictures, and was owned by ancestors of the California politicians Pat Brown and Jerry Brown. In the 1940s and 1950s, the theater was named El Teatro Victoria and showed Spanish language movies. From 1963 to 1978, the theater was a burlesque house called the New Follies Burlesk. After renovation in 1978 and reopening in March 1979, it was renamed the Victoria Theatre, and is the oldest operational theatre in San Francisco.

In 1984, Whoopi Goldberg "first came to national prominence with her one-woman show" in which she portrayed Mabley, Moms, first performed in Berkeley, California, and then at the Victoria Theatre. The Oakland Museum of California preserves a poster advertising the show.

== Recent activity ==
The theatre has video and 35mm with Dolby Pro Logic Surround Sound capabilities. The 2010 film All About Evil by Peaches Christ (stage name for Joshua Grannell), was filmed in and outside the Victoria Theatre.

From June 19 to 29, 2014, the Victoria, along with the Roxie Cinema and the Castro Theatre, hosted the 38th Frameline San Francisco International LGBT Film Festival. The theater hosts new documentary films like The Recess Ends, and live theatrical performances by Ray of Light Theatre such as Bat Boy: The Musical (2005), The Rocky Horror Show (2008), and The Who's Tommy (2009).

== See also ==
- List of San Francisco Designated Landmarks
- Castro Theatre
- Roxie Cinema
