= Monique Jenkinson =

Monique Jenkinson (born March 8, 1971), also known as Fauxnique, is an American artist, choreographer, drag performer, and author. Her memoir, Faux Queen: A Life in Drag (ISBN 978-1-61294-221-6), was published in January 2022 by Amble Press. Jenkinson’s drag persona, Fauxnique, gained prominence in 2003 when she won the Miss Trannyshack Pageant in San Francisco, becoming the first cisgender woman to be crowned a pageant-winning drag queen. In an article published to coincide with the release of Faux Queen, arts writer Tony Bravo of the San Francisco Chronicle referred to Jenkinson as a "drag anthropologist." The anthropologist reference aligns with a pull quote on the book’s cover from singer-songwriter and cabaret artist Justin Vivian Bond, who referred to Jenkinson as "The Jane Goodall of drag."

== Biography ==
Jenkinson was born in Dallas, Texas, but moved to Los Angeles, California, just weeks later, and grew up in San Pedro. The family later relocated to Modesto in the Central Valley and eventually to Broomfield, Colorado, north of Denver. As noted in Faux Queen, she grew up obsessed with ballet, fashion, and 1980s music. At the age of 17, she left Broomfield to attend Bennington College, where she studied dance and writing. After moving to San Francisco in 1992, she continued her dance practice and became a professional dancer, working with cutting-edge San Francisco choreographers, including Kathleen Hermesdorf and Sara Shelton Mann.

Jenkinson began frequenting Trannyshack, the infamous Tuesday night drag club at The Stud, in the late 1990s. She first performed there in 1998 alongside Kevin Clarke, with whom she later formed a performing partnership under the name Hagen & Simone, a reference to Nina Hagen and Nina Simone. The partnership went on to produce Future Perfect, a dance piece that deconstructed style and performance through the lenses of Vogue Magazine Fashion Editor Diana Vreeland and the authors of The Elements of Style, William Strunk Jr. and E. B. White.

Jenkinson went on to create a body of solo performance works, starting with Crying in Public (2007) and continuing through to Notes on Faux (2023). Her awards and accolades include 7x7 Magazine's Hot 20, SF Bay Guardian's GOLDIE awards, the Bay Area Reporter's Bestie awards, and nominations for the Theatre Bay Area and Isadora Duncan Dance Awards.

== Fauxnique ==
Winning the Miss Trannyshack Pageant as Fauxnique generated controversy because it was the first time a cisgender woman had been crowned as a major pageant-winning drag queen. There were also questions about whether a cisgender woman truly qualified as a drag queen. However, Jenkinson (and by extension, Fauxnique) was generally welcomed by the San Francisco drag community. "Call me a faux queen if you want, and then you'll see how real a performance I do. I mean, my name is Fauxnique, so I love playing with the idea of faux. I am an artist, and that is where my drag comes from. Part of being an artist is creating artifice."

In 2009, Jenkinson debuted Faux Real, a long-running solo cabaret performance in which Fauxnique addressed these and other questions. Leah Garchik, writing in the San Francisco Chronicle, described it as "performance art" while noting the "amazingly skillful performance" and "how the sweat changes the medium of makeup and the tension that creates."

Faux Real was also performed that same year at The New Museum in New York as part of All Made Up, a shared evening with Narcissister. In 2013, Jenkinson performed sections of the piece at LGBTQ Pride in Catania, Sicily, and paired these sections with a lecture at the Genderotica Festival in Rome, Italy.

A year later, Jenkinson debuted Luxury Items, which continued the conversation about drag while simultaneously deconstructing the idea of luxury. The piece featured Jenkinson’s portrayals of Coco Chanel and Marie Antoinette attempting to explain themselves.

In 2015, she debuted The F Word at Hackney Attic in London. Versions of the show ran until 2018 and were performed in Berlin, Cambridge, Williamstown, Provincetown, New Orleans, Seattle, San Francisco, and at Joe's Pub in New York City.

In an interview with The Bay Area Reporter, Jenkinson explained that the F stood for both Fauxnique and Feminism. "We've sort of dismantled the idea that drag is 'female impersonation,' and that women doing drag is just as much of a performance as men doing drag. Drag has always been, for me, a reclaiming of the performance of femininity."

In 2017, C*NT, or, The Horror of Nothing To See premiered at ODC's Walking Distance Dance Festival. Marie Tollon described it as "an investigation of aging, ugliness, and rage," which also played with expectations of what a drag queen's show should look like.

Jenkinson's other notable appearances and collaborations, both in and outside of her Fauxnique persona, include:

- Playing the lead role in and choreographing Silver for Gold: the Odyssey of Edie Sedgwick by David J of Love and Rockets and Bauhaus.
- Vocals on and appearance in the video for "Lipstique (feat. Fauxnique)" (2008) by Silencefiction.
- Playing the DIRT (a role originated by Justin Vivian Bond) in Taylor Mac's Lily's Revenge at Magic Theatre (2011).
- In 2012, after being named an Irvine Fellow at the de Young Museum, she collaborated on a new original piece, Instrument, with choreographers Miguel Gutierrez, Amy Seiwert, and Chris Black, as well as curating an evening entitled Making Scenes, featuring an original work entitled Our People, and prefiguring Drag Queen Story Hour with an all-ages event where teams of children created gowns for drag queens. Instrument was performed at the zürich moves! festival in Zürich, Switzerland, in 2015.
- Also in 2015, Jenkinson played Ismene/Euridyke in Shotgun Players' production of Anne Carson's ANTIGONICK.
- She was an Artist in Residence at Headlands Center for the Arts and later that year created Ordinary Practices of the Radical Body with Judith Butler.
- Girl (2018), a notable first full collaboration with long-time life partner Marc Kate, explored the figure of the "final girl."
- QUEENT (2019), with Vivvyanne Forevermore, combined elements of drag and contemporary dance and toured to Cork, Ireland, in 2020.
- A chapter dedicated to her work features in The Bodies of Others: Drag Dances and Their Afterlives by Selby Wynn Schwartz (2019), winner of the American Society for Theatre Research (ASTR) 2020 Sally Banes Publication Prize and finalist of the 2020 Lambda Literary Award in LGBTQ Nonfiction.

== Faux Queen: A Life in Drag ==
Faux Queen traces Jenkinson's journey from a ballet-obsessed girl and teenager amidst the cultural swirl of the 1970s and '80s, and later into the '90s, when she discovered both freedom and her true voice through drag. Author Michelle Tea described Faux Queen as "a playful, engaging, critically serious, counter-culturally crucial memoir that is full of joy—the primal joys of art-making, fandom, connecting with like-minded weirdos, finding your place in the world, and allowing your art and obsessions to lead you to it."

This sentiment is echoed in the foreword by author and essayist Evan James, who notes: "In those years in San Francisco, drag appeared to be enjoying a special moment, part of a long and continuing process of mutation. Drag was busy both celebrating and transcending itself: the drag scene there was also a performance art movement, one that predated and foreshadowed drag's storming the gates of popular culture."

Chapter headings such as What's in My Purse, English Boys in Eyeliner, Art Damaged, That's Problematic, Real Ladies, and Genderful reflect the broad cultural discourse and points of view explored throughout its 291 pages.

On April 27, 2022, Jenkinson appeared on episode #33 of The Midnight Mass Podcast, hosted by Peaches Christ and Michael Varrati, where she discussed her lifelong love for the film Cabaret and its influence on her work.

== Personal life ==
Jenkinson lives in San Francisco with her husband, musician and podcaster Marc Kate.
