= Oasis (San Francisco) =

Drag venue

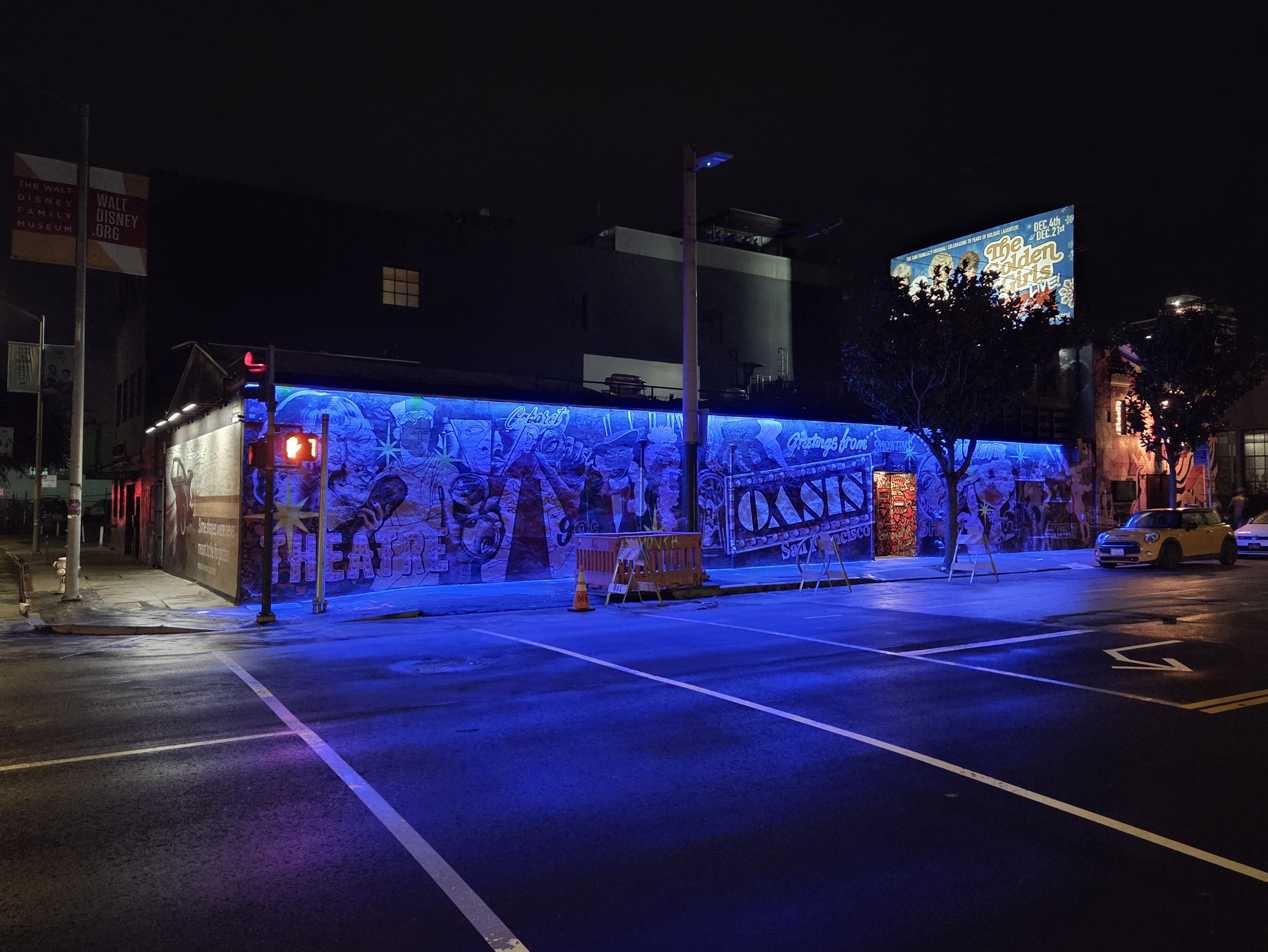
- Oasis in November 2025
- Interactive map of Oasis
- Address: San Francisco, California; United States
- Coordinates: 37.77189°N 122.41441°W

Website
- sfoasis.com

Oasis is a drag club currently located at 11th and Folsom in San Francisco's South of Market (SoMA) District. Opened in 2014 by Heklina, D'Arcy Drollinger, Geoff Benjamin and Jason Beebout, Oasis has become "a cultural hub for drag, cabaret and live theater."

== History ==
Oasis opened on New Year's Day 2015 as a joint venture between American drag queen Heklina, the first U.S. drag laureate D'Arcy Drollinger, consultant Geoff Benjamin and lead singer of Samiam Jason Beebout. Hecklina and Drollinger met ten years earlier, when the former was managing Rebel, a bar at the Market Street, San Francisco. Drollinger began performing Sex in the City parodies for the bar's Tuesday night slot, similar to Heklina's successful The Golden Girls series. Her show was well-received, and overtime Drollinger moved from Tuesdays to weekends, performing new shows including Designing Women, Friends, and Shit and Champagne. In 2014, when the news about Rebel's closing came to light, "the idea of co-owning a venue of their own began to take shape." The group of four looked at several spaces in Castro district, and finally put in an offer to operate a nightclub on the 11th Street corridor but were rejected.

Drollinger recalled that he and Heklina had "scrambled to secure investors and loans" to lease the 8,000-square-foot converted gay bathhouse for twenty years. The exact amount they offered was not disclosed, however, an online sales listing pegged the price at $875,000. The venue, formerly home to The Oasis and then Club Caliente, once featured an indoor pool that was later filled in by one of the previous owners. At the time of purchase, it had been vacant for five years.

After settling on the venue, they discovered a change in SoMa's zoning ordinance that allowed owners to operate a bar while prohibiting them from booking live acts. Heklina raised a public complaint about the issue, calling for the area's supervisor, Jane Kim, to offer a solution. "I can't find a single person who asked for this zoning control," Benjamin, a gay married father of two, told Bay Area Reporter, "It is one of these crazy planning processes where it all sounded good but nobody really thought about it. They included property in an entertainment corridor that can't have entertainment." He approached Kim's office in May 2014 to seek assurance that restriction of entertainment will be lifted before the sale was finalized. Kim, who was up for re-election the same year introduced a new legislation by June-end, excluding former nightclubs from buffer zone provisions that prevent bars-clubs to operate within 200 feet of residences. At the time, Benjamin hoped that Kim's support would help expedite the sale, and Oasis could open in time for the annual Folsom Street Fair in September 2014. The city voted to grant them the necessary permits to operate as a nightlife venue with live performances on 16 December 2014.

Interior designer and architect David Marks was brought in to renovate Oasis. Ahead of the opening night, Heklina and Drollinger hung "Mylar fringe curtains over a few lingering holes in the walls" and "tackled a pile of trash that stood at least six feet high in the middle of the room." The final step was obtaining the approval from the fire marshal, and they received the green light "moments before show time."

Drollinger and Heklina performed the opening number, a rendition of Hot Gossip's 1978 disco jam I Lost My Heart to a Starship Trooper, wearing "custom-designed silver costumes, sequined breast plates, and massive shoulder pads." In an interview with SFGate, Drollinger said: "It felt like we were against a lot of odds, and we didn't think we would make it. And it was electric because there really hadn't been a place the drag performers had made for themselves ever before, especially of that magnitude. It was so exciting and thrilling. At that point, who knew what the future was going to bring?"

== Shows and offerings ==
=== Reparations ===
Following the murders of George Floyd and Breonna Taylor, and the rise of Black Lives Matter movement across the U.S., drag queen Nicki Jizz started an all-Black drag revue Reparations on Juneteenth 2020. "Everyone put a Black Lives Matter message in their bio but immediately went back to posting thirst traps," Nicki said, "This is not just a fad. This is not just a summer thing. This is a forever thing. We need to support Black arts every day." The show, highlighting Black performers, encouraged the audience to "put your money where your black square is."

Until Juneteenth 2021, Reparations streamed on the Stud's Twitch channel with fans tuning in from Japan, Argentina and Utah. On 9 July 2021, Nicki Jizz hosted the first in-person edition of the show at Oasis featuring performances from Meatball, Bionka Simone, Militia Scunt, Sir Joq, Rahni NothingMore, KaiKai Bee Michaels and Madd Dogg 20/20, as well as a live set by Qing Qi, a DolliVision episode and music by DJ Kidd. The event tickets were priced at $10 for Black audience members and $15 for general admission, with the option to pay an extra $10 for a Black trans person to watch the show.

Reparations was eventually added to Oasis' monthly roster, and took place every second Friday. In June 2025, the show celebrated its fifth anniversary with performances from Drag Race alum LaLa Ri, Militia Scunt, and Mahlae Balenciaga.

=== Meals on Heels ===
After Drollinger exhausted the Paycheck Protection Program (PPP) loan for Oasis during the early Covid-19 pandemic, he announced the Meals on Heels initiative to pay rent and support his staff. Twice a week, customers could have a drag queen or king deliver dinner, drinks, and a socially-distanced curbside performance for $100. The income allowed Drollinger to maintain a rotating roster of forty drag performers, including Mary Lou Pearl, Amoura Teese, Roxy-Cotten Candy, Elsa Touche, Qween, and CaseFaace.

At the time, bars were permitted to deliver alcohol as an accompaniment to food orders. Drollinger partnered with Martha Avenue, a local catering business run by actor Cindy Goldfield and chef Willi Nordby, to fulfil food orders alongside Oasis' signature cocktails.

The initiative gained traction after David Landis, the chief executive of a public relations firm, reviewed Meals on Heels for his column The Gay Gourmet in San Francisco Bay Times. His order, comprising an entrée, main course, dessert, and two bottles of white wine, was delivered by competitive gymnast turned stand-up comedian in drag Poly Poptart. "Poly took one look at my husband and me and decided—correctly—that we were Broadway queens. So, she regaled us with Popular and Defying Gravity from Wicked," Landis wrote. He said the "quality of the food [was] an A plus," and the drag performance was "phenomenal."

=== Baloney ===
Baloney is an all-gay, all-male revue troupe founded by actor and filmmaker Michael Phillis and choreographer Rory Davis that has been a staple in Oasis' programming for more than ten years. The troupe combines the traditional 19th century revue structure characterized by "loosely connected skits of song or dance" with "outrageous gay content" for their shows that celebrate "body diversity, gender diversity and queer sexuality in all its many forms." Phillis, who serves as the emcee, runs the show that includes costumed spoofs, movie parodies, Broadway satire, and musical numbers. In 2023, auteur Joshua Guerci shot and released a documentary that offers a behind-the-scenes look into Baloney, following the troupe members as they "balance their artistic creation with making a living."

In 2021, Baloney hosted a fully-masked, socially- distanced "big gay" car wash outside Oasis. The troupe, joined by drag queen Rock M. Sakura, washed cars for $25 while "skater waiters" delivered food and drinks. The event was broadcast live on social media.

== Closing announcement and reactions ==
On 21 July 2025, Drollinger announced that Oasis will be closing permanently on 1 January 2026 owing to rising operational costs and a declining attendance. In an interview, Drollinger explained: "We've been struggling like a lot of other venues. Our margins are razor thin. I've had to subsidize the club every month to be able to make it through. Those resources are gone, I've cashed in the majority of my retirement account to keep this going."

The Ray of Light Theatre, which produced musicals in collaboration with Oasis, said the closing "leaves a deep void, not just in nightlife, but in the soul of San Francisco." Drag legend Peaches Christ said she was "absolutely gutted by the news" and credited Drollinger for building "something truly vital to San Francisco's queer culture" and "giving both artists and patrons a home." In a post shared on Instagram, she wrote that it was "hard to imagine the city" without Oasis. Drag performer J.A. Valentine called Oasis "a home away from home" praising the venue for its backstage camaraderie, and theatre production. "This audience is like nothing else," he said.

Claire Reilly of Axios wrote that losing Oasis "feels like losing a piece of San Francisco's heart." She said the venue has been a "huge part" of her life, since her first visit in 2021. "I've laughed and cried in those four walls, staged two shows and met lifelong friends,"she added. Marke B. of 48 Hills, a community-supported, non-profit San Francisco publication, commended the "beloved drag club" for its ten-year run in a city where bars are mandated to close post-midnight, entertainment licenses are "hard to come by," and noise complaints are a common occurrence. "The fact that a vibrant cohort of performers of all ages still can't resist the urge to put on a show or throw a party is heartening proof that you can't stifle queer culture," he said.

On 26 December 2025, Drollinger announced that Oasis had been saved from impending closure owing to a "significant financial gift" from venture capitalist Mark Stevens and his wife Mary. He had been approached by the couple's son and frequent patron of the venue, Sky, and asked to share more information about Oasis Arts, the nonprofit responsible for Oasis' programming. In a subsequent meeting, he further highlighted the nonprofit's community impact, including Oasis' stature as a "queer cultural space." The owner of the building that houses Oasis also expressed willingness to sell, making the venue a viable candidate for the "multi-million dollar donation." Oasis is expected to remain temporarily closed for the next several months for renovations and operational planning. According to Drollinger, this time will also be used to explore opportunities for securing the existing venue space permanently.

== July 2026 reopening ==
In June 2026, Oasis announced that it would reopen on July 17, 2026. Drollinger estimated the purchase price of the building at between $3.5 and $5 million, with additional funds going toward a new roof, an office remodel, and staffing. Broadway producer Greg Sottolano was named executive director of Oasis Arts, allowing Drollinger to focus on the venue's artistic direction. San Francisco mayor Daniel Lurie welcomed the reopening, describing drag as an essential part of the city's culture.

== See also ==
- LGBTQ culture in San Francisco
