= Christopher Goodwin =

American actor, playwright, and director (born 1980)

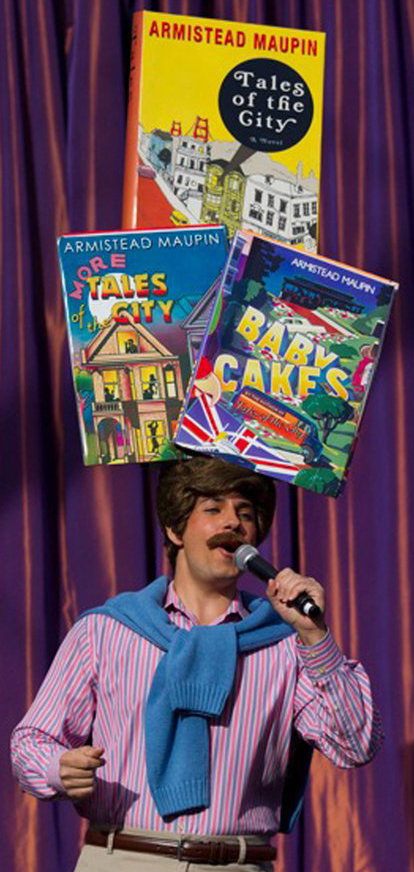
- Performing at the Tales of the City, the Musical Opening Night Gala, 2011
- Born: Christopher Richard Goodwin; December 19, 1980 (age 45); Hanford, California
- Other names: Xopher Goodwin, Christopher Green Goodwin
- Occupation: Actor
- Spouse: Lila Green (m. 2006; div. 2017)
- Website: www.heygoodwin.com

Christopher Goodwin (a.k.a. Xopher Goodwin and Christopher Green Goodwin) is an American actor, playwright, and director. He is an alumnus of Steve Silver's Beach Blanket Babylon formerly at Club Fugazi in San Francisco, California.

== Early years ==
Christopher Goodwin was born in Hanford, California on December 19, 1980. He moved to Turlock, California within the first year of his life and lived there throughout the remainder of his college years. He attended Modesto High School where he studied International Baccalaureate Drama, played football, and sang in the school choir. After graduation, he continued on to California State University, Stanislaus where he earned a B.A. in Theatre.

== Career ==
=== Actor ===
==== Theatre ====
Goodwin began acting on the stage at the age of 5 with his first performance being a Christmas pageant. He soon realized that his passion for the theatre was much more than just a hobby and soon began seeking out auditions for acting opportunities. From 1996 to 1999 he acted with the Youth Entertainment Stage Company (YES CO) in Modesto, CA, performing in such musicals as The Wiz, Grease, West Side Story, and Children of Eden. He also acted with Modesto Performing Arts in such shows as How to Succeed in Business Without Really Trying, Oklahoma!, and Shenandoah.

Goodwin worked in numerous Bay Area theatre companies from 2004 to 2005, including Alameda Civic Light Opera, Diablo Light Opera Company, Contra Costa Musical Theatre, Ray of Light Theatre, and The Willows Theatre Company.

New York and Off-Broadway credits include Puppetry of the Penis at 45 Bleecker Street Theatre, A Midsummer Nights Dream: A Rock Musical at 59E59 Theaters, Carlisle at La MaMa Experimental Theatre Club, Titus Andronicus, Fifth of July, and If You Give a Pig a Party among others.

From 2005 to 2007, Goodwin was cast in Steve Silver's Beach Blanket Babylon in the North Beach District of San Francisco, CA. He re-joined the cast in February 2011 and has played such notable characters as Tom Cruise, Justin Bieber, Carson Kressley, George Harrison, Armistead Maupin, Donald Trump, Snooki, Charlie Sheen, Freddie Mac, Adam Lambert, Chris Colfer, and Barbara Boxer.

Goodwin is a member of EMC and AGVA.

==== Film ====
Goodwin began his film career in 2004 with a short film entitled Blindspot. He has since gone on to act in numerous short films, such as Channel, Birdflu of my Chicken Heart, Batman: Battle for the Cowl and Essanay Film's Bronco Billy and the Bandit’s Secret. He also had a cameo in Cartel for which he was the Unit Production Manager.

=== Director ===
Goodwin began directing in 2003 with a production of Quilters. In 2016 he directed South of Market: The Musical V1 to critical acclaim.

=== Playwright ===
On May 14, 2008 The Baker's Oven (Goodwin's first full-length play) had its world premiere at the Manhattan Repertory Theatre in New York as part of the NY Amazing Play Festival. The West Coast premiere was on July 9, 2010, at Zombie Joe's Underground Theatre in the NoHo Arts District of North Hollywood, CA.
