= Heklina =

American and Icelandic drag queen and actor (1967–2023)

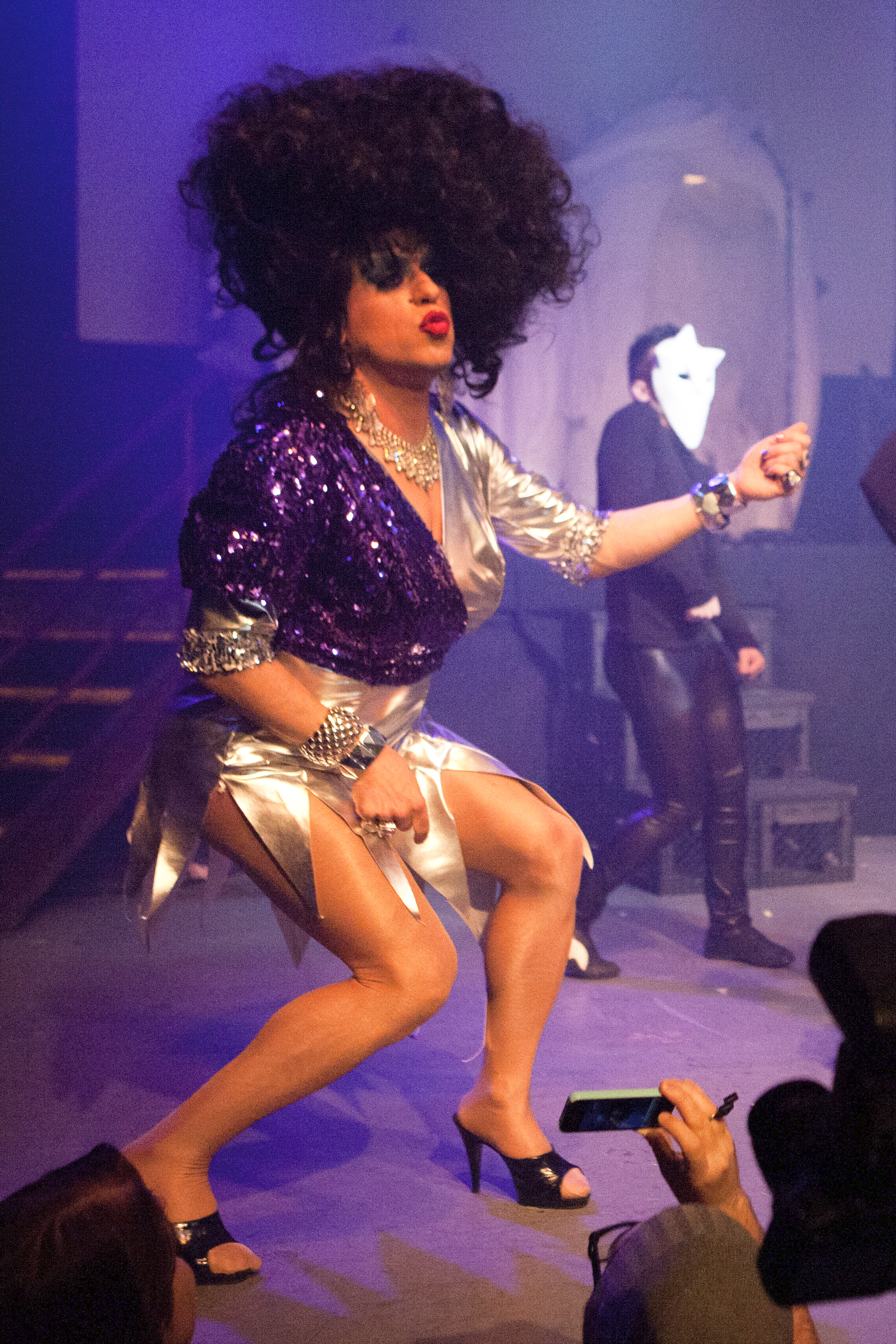
- Heklina in 2012
- Born: Steven Grygelko; June 17, 1967; Hennepin, Minnesota, U.S.
- Died: April 3, 2023 (aged 55); London, England
- Occupations: Actor; drag queen

Steven Thor Grygelko (June 17, 1967 - April 3, 2023), known professionally as Heklina, was an American and Icelandic actor, drag queen, LGBT rights activist and entrepreneur. Born near Minneapolis, Minnesota to an Icelandic mother, he lived in Iceland for several years in the 1980s, and adopted the name "Heklina" after the Icelandic volcano Hekla. Heklina founded the San Francisco LGBT/drag nightclub and live show Trannyshack in 1996.

I think that drag queens are still the eunuch clown that's safe to laugh at. It's definitively not shocking anymore. So I don't know if America's really embraced it. The early 90s was when RuPaul [was becoming famous] and it was the first time any drag queen had mainstream exposure. I don't really see a drag queen breaking out like that [again].

— Heklina on Feast of Fools in 2006

== Career ==
=== Mother (formerly Trannyshack) ===
It has several meanings; the new "Mothership" of drag in SF, something warm and comforting, nurturing even. And it also ties into the "drag mother" thing. This will be a place for all drag mothers to bring their children, to hone their craft.

Heklina co-founded Trannyshack, and hosted the show from its inception in 1996 at the Stud bar, as well as an offshoot in Los Angeles, and continued to host special events throughout San Francisco, Los Angeles, and Palm Springs, among other Californian cities. Trannyshack was the longest-running drag event series in San Francisco. On January 17, 2015, at The Oasis, Trannyshack was rebranded to Mother, evolving from a monthly to a weekly event series.

Heklina also co-produced and co-hosted the Miss Trannyshack Pageant, widely considered the premiere annual drag event in San Francisco, having sold-out every year since its debut.

=== Theater and community activities ===
Heklina acted in local theatre productions, most notably the S.F. Golden Girls productions (as Dorothy Zbornak), and emceed a variety of community and charitable events, including the Folsom Street Fair (along with Sister Roma) and San Francisco Pride. She was voted Community Grand Marshal of the 2004 San Francisco GLBTQ Pride Parade, and won the 2009 Pride Creativity Award for Outstanding Artistic Contribution to the LGBT Community. She was sainted by the Sisters of Perpetual Indulgence. Heklina co-starred in a series of short films called the Tran-ilogy of Terror, a series of drag horror spoofs written and directed by long-time collaborator Joshua Grannell, who performs under the name Peaches Christ, and also starred in the film Baby Jane?.

=== Oasis ===
Oasis, a theatre and cabaret nightclub located in San Francisco's SoMa district, hosted a grand opening event on New Year's Eve 2014; Heklina, along with three business partners (D'Arcy Drollinger, Geoff Benjamin, and Jason Beebout), signed a deal to purchase the former Oasis in October of that year. The nightclub's diverse programming features touring drag performers, cabaret and various performing artists, live musical acts, DJs and more.

=== Mommie Queerest ===
In 2022, Heklina and Peaches Christ appeared in Mommie Queerest, a drag parody of the 1981 film Mommie Dearest, in Palm Springs and Seattle. In April 2023, Heklina and Peaches both traveled to England, where the duo was set to perform the show in London and Manchester.

== Death ==
On April 3, 2023, Heklina was discovered dead in his Soho apartment by Grannell, who was in London with Heklina to prepare for a series of performances of the duo's stage show Mommie Queerest. Grannell said that Heklina was discovered "in a very compromising position" on the floor of the apartment.

Grannell posted the following message on Instagram the same day:

I am shocked and horrified to bring this news to you. I am living in a real-life nightmare so forgive me if I don't have all the answers just now. This morning, in London, England I went to collect my dear friend Heklina, who is costarring with me in a Mommie Queerest show here, and found her dead. I do not know the cause of death yet. I know this is shocking news and I am beyond stunned, but I wanted to let folks know what has happened. Heklina is not just my best friend, but a beloved icon of our community. I am a mess. Given this crisis, please do not try to contact me as I am utterly heartbroken, stunned, and focusing on what needs to get done next. I shall be in touch.

Both Grannell and Nancy French, Heklina's next of kin, have criticized the Metropolitan Police's investigation, which they say has been mismanaged due to homophobic bias. In January 2025, the Metropolitan Police apologized for the slow pace of the investigation and released CCTV surveillance video of three men believed to have been at Heklina's apartment on the night of his death.

Heklina's cause of death was not revealed for over three years. In September 2026, the Metropolitan Police reported that Heklina died due to acute mixed drug toxicity. The police "found no evidence to suggest third party involvement or that [the] death was suspicious."

== Filmography ==
Year	Title	Genre	Role	Notes
2023	Drag Me to Dinner	Television	Herself	Competed on a team with Peaches Christ (Episode 10)
2022	Judge Steve Harvey	Television	Herself	Guest (Season 1, episode 5)
2021	The Sherry Vine Variety Show	Television	Herself	Guest (Season 1, episode 2)
2020–21	Drag Time with Heklina	Podcast series	Host	35 episodes
2020	Shit & Champagne	Film	Hooker in jail	Uncredited
2019	State of Pride	Documentary film	Herself	
2017	The Boulet Brothers' Dragula	Television	Herself	Guest judge (Season 1, episode 5; season 2, episode 4)
2016	Hey Qween!	Web series	Herself	Guest (1 episode)
2015	Hush Up Sweet Charlotte	Film	Mrs. Bates	
2015	Club King	Documentary film	Herself	
2010	Baby Jane?	Film	Mrs. Bates	
2009	Trauma	Television	Liza Minnelli	Guest star (1 episode)
2008	The Cho Show	Television	Herself	Guest (1 episode)
2005	Spin the Bottle	Documentary short film	Herself	
2005	Filthy Gorgeous: The Trannyshack Story	Documentary film	Herself	
2004	Playing It Straight	Television		
2004	Whatever Happened to Peaches Christ?	Short film	Heklina	
2002	A Nightmare on Castro Street	Short film	Heklina	
2001	Season of the Troll	Short film	Heklina	

- Heklina (short) (2013)
- Drag: Not Just Men in Heels (2007)
- The House of Venus Show (2006)
- Blood, Sweat and Glitter (2004)
- Helot Revolt: The World's Greatest F*gg*t Heavy Metal Band or they were out of Bette Davis so I got this (1993)
- The Daily Show
- The Ricki Lake Show
- Jerry Springer
