= The Book of Watermarks =

1999 video game

- Developer: Watermarks (Note: Produced by Arc Entertainment. Additional work by Sony Computer Entertainment Japan.)
- Publisher: Sony Computer Entertainment
- Producer: Ryoji Akagawa
- Designer: Takashi Kobayashi
- Artist: Mie Owase
- Platform: PlayStation
- Release: JP: July 15, 1999
- Genre: Adventure
- Mode: Single-player

The Book of Watermarks is an adventure video game developed by Watermarks and published by Sony Computer Entertainment for the PlayStation. Self-described as an "adult-friendly adventure", the game is an interactive adventure game with pre-rendered graphics similar to Myst, with a visual and narrative style strongly influenced by the Shakespeare play The Tempest and the 1991 film Prospero's Books. Although released to minimal fanfare, The Book of Watermarks has retrospectively been assessed by critics as a unique and experimental entry in the catalog of PlayStation games.

== Plot ==
Prospero (played by Jack Donner), the Duke of Milan, is deposed and exiled to a desert island. Prospero invites the player, in the role of Ferdinand, to solve a series of puzzles as they explore his estate to uncover twelve of Prospero's thirteen magical books, which are the source of his powers. As the player collects the books around the island, Prospero opines over the knowledge within through a series of full motion video scenes, in which each is the source and sum total of human knowledge, responsible for many of the social and historical changes of the Renaissance. However, once the player obtains all the books, Prospero reveals that he seeks the books not to recover them, but to destroy them, stating that the books are "monsters spawned by limitless human desire," with the titular Book of Watermarks creating infinite and uncontainable amounts of information dangerous to humanity. Once Prospero retrieves the books, he vows to cast each of them into the sea.

== Gameplay ==
A screenshot of The Book of Watermarks, depicting the pre-rendered environments.

The Book of Watermarks is played as a conventional adventure game in which the player navigates the pre-rendered scenery of two islands, Ceres and Iris Island, to collect the twelve books sought by Prospero. The game is navigated from a first-person perspective, with the player using directional controls to travel between static scenes, with animations playing between transitions. To progress, players complete a series of puzzle mechanics, including finding keys for locked doors, completing patterns or words found on clues elsewhere in the island, or navigating mazes. If the player is stuck, they are able to find and consult the titular Book of Watermarks to receive clues about where to go next, either identifying the location of the next puzzle, or providing a solution. Rarely for a Japanese release, the game's full motion video cutscenes and much of its text is mostly in English.

== Development ==
The Book of Watermarks was developed over the course of two years by three developers at Watermark, led by designer Takashi Kobayashi who was previously employed by KAZe and designed Digital Pinball: Last Gladiators. Sony's Arc Entertainment helped produce the game. Kobayashi stated the game was developed under several influences, primarily the Shakespeare play The Tempest, of which Prospero plays a character, the Jorge Luis Borges story The Library of Babel, and the 1991 Peter Greenaway film Prospero's Books, as well as heavy use of Classical and Renaissance aesthetics and philosophy. Sony Computer Entertainment held a release event and interview with Kobayashi on 14 July 1999 in Ginza. At the event, Kobayashi praised the game as a "game for adults", reflecting upon his aim of developing a game that "has an appropriate amount of intelligence, have a world that arouses the imagination, and (is not) noisy." The soundtrack of the game is partly contributed to by Irish composer Moya Brennan, member of Clannad and sister to Irish new age artist Enya. Despite the entire game having been filmed and localized in English, it was not released outside Japan.

== Reception ==
The Book of Watermarks received lukewarm attention upon release. Chinese publication Game Software praised the game's production as "outstanding among similar works" due to the involvement of Sony Computer Entertainment, although found the puzzles "a bit too difficult". Japanese magazine Dengeki PlayStation praised the "splendor" of the game's graphics, although found the movement of the camera slow and "unsuitable for impatient people".

=== Retrospective ===
The Book of Watermarks has retrospectively been provided with more attention, with favorable reception of the game as a unique entry in the catalog of the PlayStation, and indicative of the appetite for Japanese developers to release unusual or experimental titles. Simon Parkin of Eurogamer stated the game was "memorable" and part of an effort by developers "to paint their visions in full, often without compromise, in a way that only the best-funded independent game-makers are able to do today." Similarly, in a retrospective of the PlayStation's twentieth anniversary, Edge cited The Book of Watermarks as an example of the "unusual curios" and "leftfield releases" on the platform. Keith Stuart of The Guardian similarly cited The Book of Watermarks as part of a genre of "eerie" games on the PlayStation, stating the console featured "weird, traumatising games because (it) was so successful, game development was still relatively inexpensive and European publishers were enthusiastically importing Japanese titles."

Long after its release, several critics have written long-form reviews of the game. Writing for The Obscuritory, Phil Salvador praised the game's visual design, stating that its "monumental stature" and "stately wonder...turns if from just a dull dull collection of puzzles into a divine game of connect-the-dots." Whilst critiquing the pacing and puzzles in the game, Salvador praised its eclectic design, stating 'the game cribs from a basket of influences, re-appropriating European art, history, literature, and even entire languages out of context for its own purposes. It can be narratively inert, erratically paced, and, frankly, infuriating, but it's never uninteresting." Hardcore Gaming 101 also noted that whilst "the adventure is linear, the riddles are rather classical and the progression isn't really fascinating," the game was a unique departure from convention in the Japanese market, stating "it definitely has the merit of trying to offer to the Japanese public a game whose standards stemmed from an other ludo-cultural context than that of the anime-dominated Japanese adventure game scene." Luke Plunkett of Kotaku praised the game's "serious dedication to context...with a wonderfully late-90s look and sound."
