= Psyanotic =

Studio album by Thomas Dekker
- Released: July 7, 2008
- Genre: Electronica
- Length: 56:47
- Producer: Thomas Dekker

Psyanotic Is the debut album of American actor Thomas Dekker. The album is currently available in digital format and can be found in sites such as CD Baby, Napster, and iTunes. As he explained in an interview:
"The term Cyanotic is a scientific term for when there is an inadequate supply of oxygen to the blood. I changed the spelling to Psy, as in psychology, as a metaphor for a lack of thought in today's music. I suppose the album is to be a kind of cure, hopefully, for this prevailing lack of mental and emotional stimulation."

The album was recorded, mixed and mastered by Thomas himself, Some songs were uploaded to his Myspace page before the release of the album including "Dare", "Lava Life" and "Aicea" as well as an album teaser, songs that were later tweaked for the album. Thomas later explained in a Q&A session: "The album was only tweaked because music should exist in the time it is released, above all, and the album had been started so many years earlier."

== Track listing ==
1. "Dare" - 3:54
2. "Melt Away" - 5:20
3. "Insects" - 4:08
4. "Daddy" - 4:27
5. "Psyanotic" - 5:16
6. "A Child Once Existed" - 3:10
7. "Birth Cavity - 4:22
8. "Samsara" - 5:56
9. "Aicea" - 4:22
10. "Lava Life" - 4:39
11. "Can We Be" - 3:45
12. "Beyond This World" - 6:06
