= Sparkler (film) =

1997 film by Darren Stein

- Directed by: Darren Stein
- Written by: Catherine Eads; Darren Stein
- Produced by: Jennifer Amerine; Kimberly Jacobs
- Starring: Park Overall; Jamie Kennedy; Freddie Prinze Jr. Steven Petrarca; Veronica Cartwright
- Cinematography: Rodney Taylor
- Edited by: Ryan Gold
- Music by: Dave Russo
- Distributed by: Strand Releasing
- Release dates: October 16, 1997 (Hamptons); March 19, 1999 (United States)
- Running time: 96 minutes
- Country: United States
- Language: English

Sparkler is a 1997 American comedy drama film directed by Darren Stein, written by Catherine Eads and Stein, and starring Park Overall, Jamie Kennedy, Freddie Prinze Jr., Steven Petrarca and Veronica Cartwright. It is Stein's feature directorial debut.

== Plot ==
Melba May leaves her husband, truck driver Flint, when she catches him cheating on her with her best friend, Hurricane. She moves in with her mother Sherri, but her psychic friend Wanda tells her that the cards show Melba surrounded by "three kings". That night at the local roadhouse, Melba meets three young men: Trent, Joel and Brad. The guys happened to be on their way from L.A. to Las Vegas when their BMW blew a tire, and they are waiting for auto repair to come help them. Melba befriends and dances with them, then later discovers one of her earrings is missing. Believing one of the boys has it, Melba follows them to Vegas.

Once in Vegas, she meets up with her old high-school friend Dottie, a former cheerleader who now does dance routines with her baton at a sleazy dive bar called The Crack. Meanwhile, Flint, learning that Melba has won $1 million in a magazine sweepstakes, decides he wants her back.

== Cast ==
- Park Overall as Melba May
- Veronica Cartwright as Dottie Delgato
- Jamie Kennedy as Trent
- Steven Petrarca as Joel
- Freddie Prinze Jr. as Brad
- Don Harvey as Flint
- Sandy Martin as Ed
- Grace Zabriskie as Sherri
- Sheila Tousey as Hurricane
- Octavia Spencer as Wanda
- Glenn Shadix as Announcer
- Chris Ellis as Buddy #1

== Release ==
The film premiered at the Hamptons International Film Festival on October 16, 1997. It was given a limited theatrical release two years later on March 19, 1999.

In January 2023, specialty distributor Strand Releasing gave Sparkler a 2K restoration and released it to streaming and Blu-ray.

== Reception ==
The film has a 55% rating on Rotten Tomatoes based on eleven reviews.

Brendan Kelly of Variety gave the film a positive review, calling it "an often funny, always captivating ride through the kitschy underbelly of life on the road to Vegas."

Kevin Thomas of the Los Angeles Times also gave the film a positive review and wrote, "Overall and Cartwright are especially winning, and Cartwright makes Dottie appealing in the vulnerability and longing that lurks beneath her hard, painted and bewigged surface. 'Sparkler' lives up to its name."

TV Guide also gave the film a positive review: "With its heart on its sleeve and not much on its mind, Darren Stein's uneven comedy floats along on a few good laughs and a certain goofy charm."
