= All About Evil =

2010 film by Peaches Christ

- Theatrical release poster
- Directed by: Joshua Grannell
- Written by: Joshua Grannell
- Produced by: Brian Benson; Debbie Brubaker; Joshua Grannell; Darren Stein
- Starring: Natasha Lyonne; Thomas Dekker; Cassandra Peterson; Noah Segan; Jack Donner
- Cinematography: Tom Richmond
- Edited by: Rick LeCompte
- Music by: Vinsantos
- Production companies: Backlash Films; Fog City Pictures
- Release dates: May 1, 2010 (San Francisco International Film Festival); July 30, 2010 (New York City)
- Running time: 98 minutes
- Country: United States
- Language: English
- Box office: $7,995

All About Evil is a 2010 American black comedy slasher film and marks the feature film directorial debut of Joshua Grannell, who also wrote the script. The film stars Natasha Lyonne as an unhinged theatre owner who begins making snuff films and screening them at her decrepit San Francisco theater — presenting them as fictional works — in order to prevent the theater from going bankrupt.

The film was shot at the Victoria Theatre in San Francisco and also stars Thomas Dekker, Cassandra Peterson, Noah Segan, and Jack Donner. The soundtrack featured a score by Vinsantos and songs by artists such as The Vanishing. Grannell based the film on his 2003 short Grindhouse; the film's title, All About Evil, refers to the 1950 drama film All About Eve. All About Evil premiered at the 2010 San Francisco International Film Festival and Grannell independently released the film to DVD that same year. The film was later given a new home video release in 2022 through Severin Films.

== Plot ==
In 1984, young Deborah Tennis is electrocuted by a microphone during a stage performance at the Victoria Theatre in San Francisco, which her family owns and operates, but she miraculously survives.

Sixteen years later, the introverted Deborah works as a librarian, and operates her family's now-decrepit theater, which primarily holds revival screenings of exploitation and horror films. With her father deceased, Deborah is under the thumb of her abusive mother, Tammy. When Tammy confronts her one night about selling the theater, Deborah flies into an unexpected rage and brutally stabs her to death in the lobby, just as a screening is about to begin. In a panic, Deborah rushes to the projection booth to start the film, but inadvertently screens security footage showing the murder she just committed. The patrons of the theater — among them, teenage film buff Steven Thompson — assume the footage to be a short film screened before the main feature, and are impressed by it.

Mr. Twigs, a longtime projectionist at the theater who despised Tammy, helps Deborah hide Tammy's corpse in the theater's attic. The unhinged Deborah commits a second murder with the help of Mr. Twigs, this time of a theatergoer named Veronica, and films the act; in the footage, Deborah acts as a Victorian queen, while she and Mr. Twigs cut off Veronica's breasts with a guillotine. They screen the footage as a short film before another main feature, and it shocks the audience. Soon, the Victoria's graphic short films attract a cult following, among them Steven, whose mother Linda begins to worry about her son's fascination with violent films. Steven becomes infatuated with Deborah, heralding her as a pioneering female horror director.

Meanwhile, in order to generate new material, Deborah and Mr. Twigs pose as family members of Veda and Vera, two sociopathic twin sisters who are about to be released from a child psychiatric hospital for murdering their parents years prior, and manage to take the girls under their wing. Deborah encounters a violent vagrant, Adrian, on the street, and also recruits him to assist them in making new films. Under Deborah's direction, the group ambush Deborah's librarian co-worker, Evelyn, as she is closing up the local library. The group film as Deborah stitches Evelyn's mouth shut and lock her, still alive, in the theater attic.

Evelyn's torture footage, dubbed The Maiming of the Shrew, is shown at a subsequent screening, attended by Steven, who is accompanied by his popular classmate, Claire Cavanaugh. During the show, Deborah stabs Claire to death in the bathroom and films it with the help of Veda and Vera. Meanwhile, Evelyn manages to tear open the sutures in her lips, and begins screaming for help from the theater attic, only to be beheaded by Mr. Twigs. Steven discovers Claire is missing, but assumes she left the theater of her own accord.

When Steven is accused of causing Claire's disappearance, he becomes suspicious of Deborah and the goings-on at the Victoria. Steven's friend, Judy, visits the theater to interview Deborah for their school newspaper, but attempts to leave after finding Claire's bloody cell phone. She is accosted by Deborah, Veda, Vera, Adrian, and Mr. Twigs, is bound and gagged, and locked in the attic. Steven suspects that Deborah has caused Judy's disappearance, but police dismiss his claims when Deborah accuses him of being an obsessed fan. Deborah taunts Steven by informing him that she is shooting her debut feature film, which she has "just started casting."

Steven attends Deborah's premiere along with numerous fans, and finds that his mother has also decided to attend. Veda and Vera serve the patrons cups of punch laced with cyanide, planning to hold a toast during the screening in which the entire audience will ingest the poison and die, an event to be filmed by Mr. Twigs. Steven botches the mass-poisoning by warning the others, before Deborah proceeds to screen her film, Gore and Peace, in which she attempts to murder Judy in real-time footage backstage. Steven manages to save Judy as the theater erupts into a melee when the guests find they have been locked inside. Adrian is killed when Evelyn's corpse falls on him from the attic, and one of Steven's classmates, Lolita, stabs Mr. Twigs to death while Veda and Vera attempt to start a fire to incinerate everyone inside, though the guests manage to escape unharmed. Meanwhile, Deborah kidnaps Linda at knifepoint and brings her to the theater's roof, where Steven confronts her. Deborah begins to describe her plan of killing Linda as the "finale of her movie" where the "audience roots for the killer", only for Steven to shut her up by criticizing Deborah harshly, calling her a disgrace to her father, a hack director, and a bad actress. Steven's words immediately destroy Deborah's ego and causes her to break down into tears, allowing Linda to wrangle the knife from Deborah and stab her in the throat, before Steven pushes Deborah off the building to her death.

Outside, as police enclose the building, Veda and Vera exit, both brandishing knives. Instead of surrendering, the twins viciously stab each other to death. When the news talks to Steven about Deborah's films and the possibility of her actions becoming a film, Steven expresses his doubts that will happen, commenting that if it were, Deborah would rise from the dead by now. Steven then leaves with his mother and Judy, passing by Deborah's corpse as they depart down the street.

== Cast ==
- Natasha Lyonne as Deborah "Debbie" Tennis
- Thomas Dekker as Steven Thompson
- Cassandra Peterson as Linda Thompson
- Mink Stole as Evelyn
- Noah Segan as Adrian
- Jack Donner as Mr. Twigs
- Jade Ramsey as Veda
- Nikita Ramsey as Vera
- Ashley Fink as Lolita
- Ariel Hart as Judy
- Kat Turner as Veronica
- Anthony Fitzgerald as Gene
- Lyndsy Kail as Claire Cavanaugh
- Patrick Bristow as Peter Gorge
- Julie Caitlin Brown as Tammy Tennis
- Joshua Grannell as Peaches Christ

== Production ==
=== Development ===
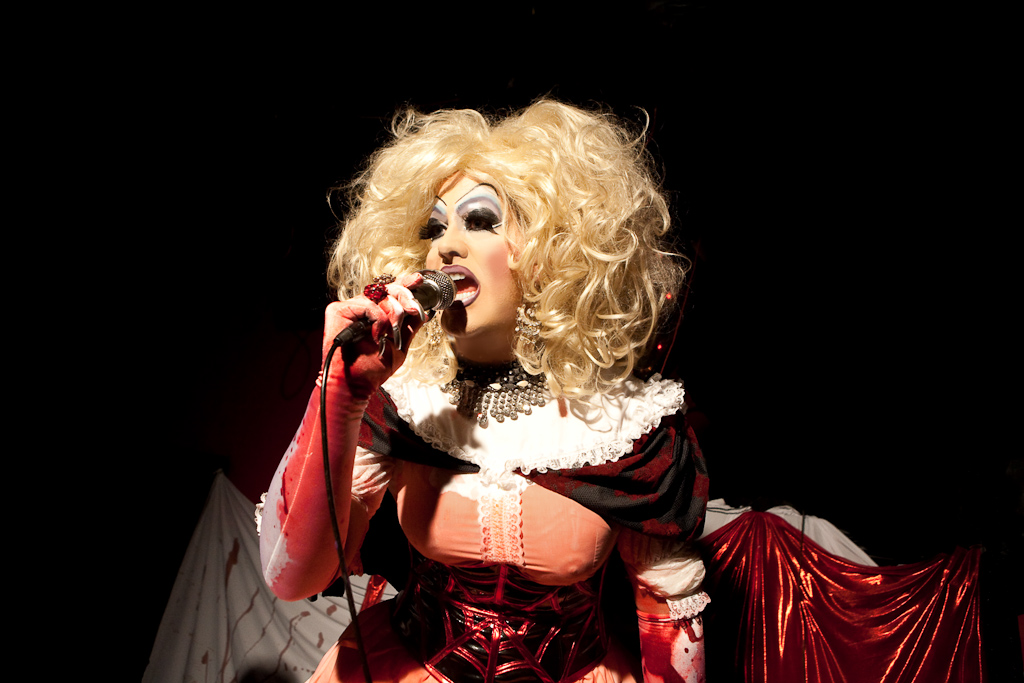
Joshua Grannell based the film on his short film Grindhouse; he also appeared in the film as his drag persona Peaches Christ.

All About Evil was written and directed by Joshua Grannell, based on his short film Grindhouse, which features a similar, truncated premise. Grannell, a Maryland native who loved horror films from a young age, had previously worked as a manager of the Bridge Theatre in San Francisco, where he also staged weekly midnight movie events dubbed "Midnight Mass," which featured costume contests, drag shows, and other events based on the films being shown. Prior to making All About Evil, Grannell's "Midnight Mass" concept was created into the 2007 television series Midnight Mass with Your Host Peaches Christ in which Grannell, performing as his drag character of Peaches Christ, hosted airings of horror films. The series was funded by Mark Cuban, who had recently purchased Landmark Theatres, the company that owned and operated the Bridge Theatre which Grannell managed.

Writer-director Darren Stein, a friend of Grannell's, produced the film.

=== Casting ===
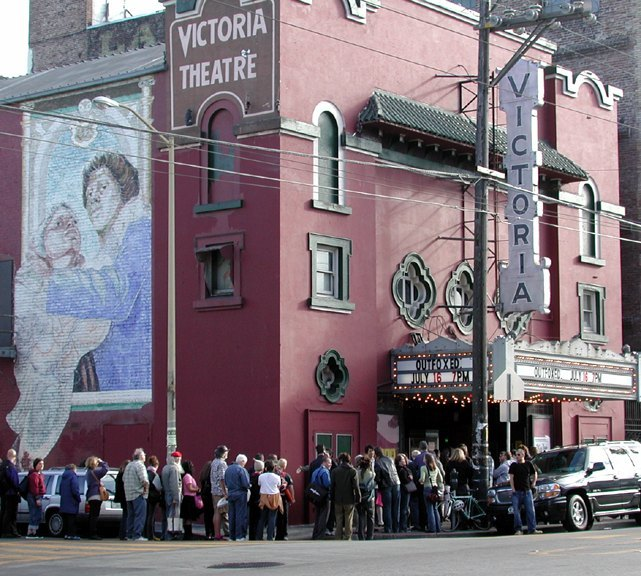
Some filming took place at the Victoria Theatre in San Francisco.

Natasha Lyonne was cast in the lead role at the recommendation of cinematographer Tom Richmond, who had shot Slums of Beverly Hills (1998), in which Lyonne had starred. Cult figures Mink Stole and Cassandra Peterson were both cast after being asked by Grannell, with whom they were acquaintances.

=== Filming ===
All About Evil was shot on location at the Victoria Theatre in San Francisco.

The make-up was created by French artist Aurora Bergere. Grannell created a special promo clip for the 2010 WonderCon, which narrated his project.

== Release ==
All About Evil premiered on May 1, 2010, as part of the San Francisco International Film Festival.

The film ran in a tour of United States cinemas between July and November 2010.

The film had a limited theatrical release on June 17, 2010, as part of the LA Film Festival (Shock).

The film had its European premiere at Cornerhouse in Manchester as part of the AND (Abandon Normal Devices) festival on October 2, 2010, coinciding with the debut of Midnight Mass performed outside of the US.

=== Box office ===
The film grossed $7,995 at the domestic box office.

=== Critical response ===
On the review aggregator website Rotten Tomatoes, 89% of 9 critics' reviews are positive.

Dennis Harvey of Variety described the film as a "campy gore-horror opus" in the tradition of Blood Feast (1963) and Serial Mom (1994), concluding: "Over-the-top perfs and colorful low-budget production polish hit the right notes of knowing cheese, but the good-naturedly derivative script could have used some real wit."

=== Home media ===
All About Evil was released independently by Peachest Christ Productions on DVD in December 2010. The film was released in a special edition Blu-ray in 2022 by Severin Films.

== Soundtrack ==
The score was composed by ambient musician Vinsantos. The full soundtrack includes the following:

=== Track list ===
No.	Title	Writer(s)	Performer	Length
1.	"Counterfeit"	Vinsantos
2.	"Little Debbie's Theme"	Vinsantos, Suzanne Ramsey
3.	"Macabaret"	Vinsantos
4.	"Thorn"	Vinsantos	Vinsantos
5.	"Evil Dance"	Jon Fearon, Lee Gale, Stuart Oglivie	The Longcut
6.	"Listen to the Radio"	Timothy Hulbert Hines, Michael Jaimi Kamoo	Lights On
7.	"New Skin"	New Skin	New Skin
8.	"Terror, I've Been Dying to Meet You"	Jessie Evans, Brian Hock	The Vanishing
9.	"Get In Line"	Cynthia Mansourian, Andres Zevallos, Scott Brown	Swann Dancer
10.	"In Ruins"	Kelly Correll Brown, Steven Sedgwick, Scott Brown, Melanie Burkett, Kevin Brown	Black Ice
11.	"Star Quality"	Agness Twin, Marc Kate	Agness Twin, Marc Kate
