= Trannyshack =

San Francisco drag club

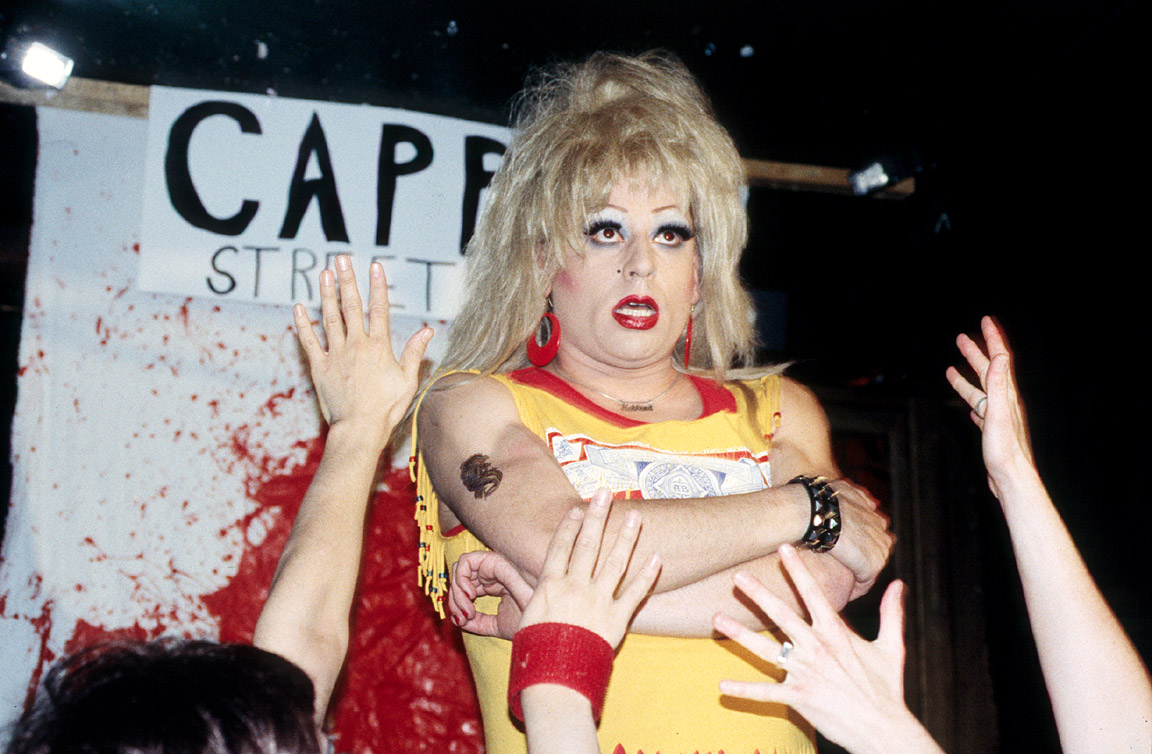
Heklina performing at Trannyshack

Trannyshack was a San Francisco drag club started by drag queen Heklina in 1996 as an offshoot of Klubstitute, and was a weekly fixture at The Stud bar in San Francisco for 12 years, drawing large crowds on a regular basis. The Tuesday night performances at The Stud ended on 12 August 2008, with Trannyshack resuming as a monthly event at DNA Lounge in March 2010.

== Trannyshack history ==
The Trannyshack stage has hosted celebrities including Lady Gaga, Gwen Stefani, RuPaul, Charo, Michelle Visage, Mary Wilson and many of the contestants from RuPaul's Drag Race among others. In the early years of the club, Ana Matronic of the Scissor Sisters lived in San Francisco and performed frequently at Trannyshack before moving to New York in 1999.

Trannyshack ended as a weekly Tuesday night show on August 12, 2008, with "The Final Tuesday". Heklina claims she stopped presenting the show because its success caused it to be copied by other shows: "I felt like if everyone's trying to copy me, maybe I should try to do something different." The Trannyshack name has become so popular that Heklina has filed six cease-and-desist letters against other clubs using the name.

In January 2015, Trannyshack was renamed "Mother" and started taking place at Oasis, a San Francisco gay club owned by Heklina. The reason for the name change was out of respect for the transgender community, who were critical of the use of the word "tranny" as being offensive. "Mother" ended in February 2020.

== Miss Trannyshack Pageant ==
The Miss Trannyshack Pageant is no longer held in a nightclub. In 2004, Trannyshack Founder and Promoter Heklina teamed up with event producer, Juan Garcia of Beatbox Events to move the event from the clubs to the Regency Ballroom. Together with Juan Garcia and the help of drag queen and co-hostess Juanita More, the contest became a late-night dance party featuring celebrity judges, live performances, concert-like production, and special effects.

Until 2007, which marked the final Miss Trannyshack Pageant, this annual offsite event had been a pageant-style competition for the title "Miss Trannyshack." Candidates for the pageant were recruited from Trannyshack, a weekly show at the Stud Bar in San Francisco. Every week, a new theme was presented. Guests could expect a mix of everything from lowbrow trash, "old-school" traditional drag performances, avant-garde and highbrow installations, and punk-rock shows in a dance-club setting. Trannyshack guest favorites worked towards entering and winning the coveted title "Miss Trannyshack" at the annual Trannyshack pageant.

== Special Trannyshack events ==
Trannyshack also holds the annual Trannyshack Reno bus trip. Hosted by Trannyshack veteran Peaches Christ and held over Easter Weekend, participants are encouraged to dress and act as outrageously and provocatively as possible. Heavy drinking is also encouraged. During the ride from San Francisco to Reno, the tour bus makes several pit stops in relatively conservative places such as Placerville and Donner Pass. The culmination of the event is a special Trannyshack show at a Reno nightclub, followed by Easter Sunday brunch the next day at a local casino.

Trannyshack also held the annual SS Trannyshack chartered boat cruise on San Francisco Bay, usually held in September, although the event was not held since 2004; however, it was announced that the event would be revived for the 2009 Folsom Street Fair.
