= The Recess Ends =

2009 documentary film

The Recess Ends (2009) is a documentary film by brothers Austin and Brian Chu about the 2008-2009 recession. They crossed the United States to document the effects of the recession on people and communities, and filmed in all 50 states.

The film premiered at the Victoria Theater in San Francisco on September 30, 2009.
