= Jack Donner =

American actor (1928–2019)

- Donner in Mission: Impossible (1969)
- Born: Jake Doner; October 29, 1928; Los Angeles, California, U.S.
- Died: September 21, 2019 (aged 90); Los Angeles, California, U.S.
- Occupation: Actor
- Years active: 1958–2019
- Spouses: Elizabeth R. Ryan (m. 1951, divorced) Julie Sommars (m. 1960, divorced) Margaret Markov (m. 1970; div. 1973)

Jack Donner (born Jake Doner; October 29, 1928 – September 21, 2019) was an American actor whose career in theater, television, and film extended over six decades.

== Career ==
A native of Los Angeles, California, Donner worked in television and film since the 1950s including early work on The Guiding Light and As the World Turns. Honing his craft, he performed in seven successive seasons of New York City regional and stock theater.

Beginning in the 1960s he had many guest star and co-starring roles in shows including The Man from U.N.C.L.E., Mission: Impossible, Mannix, Kojak, and The Streets of San Francisco. However, he was probably best known for his role of Romulan Subcommander Tal in the original Star Trek episode "The Enterprise Incident". He later returned as a Vulcan priest in the episodes "Kir'Shara" and "Home" of Star Trek: Enterprise. Along with Joseph Ruskin and Clint Howard, he is one of only three actors to appear in both the original Star Trek series and Star Trek: Enterprise. In 1998 he appeared in the uncredited role of Commander Kinwon in Power Rangers in Space. He had a recurring role on General Hospital as Nikolas and Spencer Cassadine's butler, Alfred.

Donner starred in Peaches Christ's black comedy film All About Evil and in Bryan Moore's adaptation of H. P. Lovecraft's Cool Air. He also had a brief but memorable scene as a fire-and-brimstone prosecutor who demands death in the 1971 film The Night God Screamed.

He founded Oxford Theater with fellow actor Lee Delano. Their students included Barry Levinson, Craig T. Nelson, Barbara Parkins, and Don Johnson.

== Filmography ==
=== Film ===
Year	Title	Role	Notes
1958	Invisible Avenger	Billy Sanchez	
1962	Hand of Death	Cop	
1963	Escape from Hell Island	Lyle Dennison	
1967	Hotel	Elliot	Uncredited
1971	The Night God Screamed	Prosecutor	
1973	The All-American Boy	Director	Uncredited
1974	Black Starlet	Fake Producer	
1997	The Emissary: A Biblical Epic	Captain	
1997	Johnny Mysto: Boy Wizard	King Arthur	
1998	Gideon	Mr. Taylor	
1999	Stigmata	Father Alameida	
1999	Family Tree	Joseph	
1999	Retro Puppet Master	Afzel	Direct-to-video
2000	The Adventures of Rocky and Bullwinkle	Average Grandpa	
2001	Soulkeeper	Smokey	
2001	Island Prey	Doctor	
2002	Demon Under Glass	Dr. William Bassett	
2003	First Watch	Paul	Direct-to-video
2003	Exorcism	Father John Lansing	
2004	Imaginary Heroes	Kenny	
2007	The Invisible	Morris	Uncredited
2007	Brotherhood of Blood	Paul Cramer	
2007	Safe Harbour	Mr. Feigenbaum	
2007	Star Trek: Of Gods and Men	Special Wedding Guest	Direct-to-video
2007	Plot 7	Granpa Joe	
2008	Lower Learning	Old Curt	
2008	Farm House	Dark One / Dr. Miller	
2008	How to Be a Serial Killer	Mr. Wilson	
2008	Four Christmases	Grandpa	
2009	Gurdian	Abraham	
2009	Michael Jackson's This Is It	Gravedigger	Uncredited
2010	All About Evil	Mr. Twigs	
2010	Anderson's Cross	Dr. Landry	
2010	Vampire	Dr. William Bassett	
2010	Privilege	Rabbi	Direct-to-video
2011	J. Edgar	Edgar's Father	
2011	Underground	Gunther	
2012	My Funny Valentine	Mr. Triffalette	
2013	Night of the Templar	The Grand Master	
2013	A New York Heartbeat	Big Didi	
2014	Dumbbells	Old Man Buzz	
2014	2 Bedroom 1 Bath	Old Man Thompson	
2014	Anatomy of Deception	Travis	
2018	Unthinkable	Mr. Joseph Stone	
2020	Unbelievable!!!!!	Jack Donner	Released posthumously

=== Television ===
Year	Title	Role	Notes
1960	Death Valley Days	Billy Crane	Episode: "Pamela's Oxen"
1962	Dr. Kildare	Dr. John Shea	Episode: "Something of Importance"
1962	Have Gun – Will Travel	Teasing Man at Hotel Carlton	Episode: "Penelope"
1964	The Man from U.N.C.L.E.	Premier Karim	Episode: "The Secret Sceptre Affair"
1965	My Favorite Martian	Master of Ceremonies	Episode: "I'd Rather Fight Than Switch"
1965	Get Smart	The Courier	Episode: "Aboard the Orient Express"
1966–1973	Mission: Impossible	Various roles	11 episodes
1967	The Monkees	Director	S1:E28, "Monkees on the Line"
1968	I Dream of Jeannie	Joe	Episode: "Genie, Genie, Who's Got the Genie?: Part 1"
1968	Star Trek: The Original Series	Tal	Episode: "The Enterprise Incident"
1968	Judd, for the Defense	Mr. Forster	Episode: "The Gates of Cerberus"
1969	The Name of the Game	Nate Pearson	Episode: "The Inquiry"
1969	The Flying Nun	Luis Pedrosa	Episode: "Dear Aggie"
1971, 1973	Mannix	Blair / Norton	2 episodes
1972	Mission Impossible	John Dawson	Episode "Committed"
1973	Griff	Frankie Masters	Episode: "Elephant in a Cage"
1973, 1975	Police Story	Meeks / Henslowe	2 episodes
1974	The Manhunter	Cully Barnes	Episode: "The Doomsday Gang"
1975	Kojak	Krakauer	Episode: "Sweeter Than Life"
1977	The Streets of San Francisco	Joseph Hess	Episode: "Innocent No More"
1996	Baywatch	Max Murat	Episode: "Liquid Assets"
1996–1998	Days of Our Lives	Judge DuBois / Maurice Renet	6 episodes
1998	Conan the Adventurer	Blind Man	Episode: "The Labyrinth"
1998	Power Rangers in Space	Commander Kinwon	3 episodes
1999	Frasier	Mr. Hawkins	Episode: "Taps at the Montana"
1999	Charmed	Judge Renault	Episode: "The Power of Two"
1999	Shasta McNasty	Evil Doctor	Episode: "The Return of Buster"
2000	Chicken Soup for the Soul	Judge Twigs	Episode: "The Final Show"
2000	G vs E	Judge Cody	Episode: "Portrait of Evil"
2000	The District	Mr. Bukich	Episode: "The Jackal"
2000	The Privateers	President Cameron Lascar	Television film
2001	Buffy the Vampire Slayer	Cleric #1	Episode: "Spiral"
2001	Strong Medicine	Josiah / Amish Elder	Episode: "Silent Epidemic"
2002	Malcolm in the Middle	Old Man	Episode: "Lois' Makeover"
2002	Roswell	Clayton Wheeler	2 episodes
2002	The Bernie Mac Show	Jeremiah	Episode: "The Sweet Life"
2003	7th Heaven	Mr. McNeil	Episode: "The One Thing"
2003	Scare Tactics	Clayton Twigs	Episode: "Bigfoot Attacks"
2004	According to Jim	Old Man	Episode: "The Hunters"
2004	Star Trek: Enterprise	Vulcan Priest	2 episodes
2005	The Michael Jackson Trial	Judge Rodney Melville	18 episodes
2005, 2006	Reno 911!	Priest	2 episodes
2006	Freddie	Don	Episode: "The Search for Grandpa Four"
2006	Where There's a Will	Dr. Whitehouse	Television film
2006	Alias	The Rose	Episode: "No Hard Feelings"
2006	Lovespring International	Old Soldier	Episode: "Lydia's Last Night"
2006–2010	General Hospital	Alfred	55 episodes
2007	Criminal Minds	Old Nate	Episode: "Legacy"
2007	Cold Case	Maurice Habershaw '07	Episode: "Boy Crazy"
2008	Rodney	Mr. Hocker	Episode: "Finale"
2008	Happy Hour	Don	Episode: "The Election"
2008	Lewis Black's Root of All Evil	Priest	Episode: "Donald Trump vs. Viagra"
2009	In Gayle We Trust	Lloyd Adams	Episode: "Gayle and the Birthday Call"
2009	So This Is Love	Jack	3 episodes
2010	Ghost Whisperer	Man in Hospital Gown	Episode: "The Children's Parade"
2010	Hot in Cleveland	Arthur	Episode: "Who's Your Mama?"
2010	Bones	Crusty	Episode: "The Maggots in the Meathead"
2013	The Wizards Return: Alex vs. Alex	Papa Fabrizio	Television film
2013	Bad Samaritans	Francis	Episode: "Pilot"
2014	Suburgatory	Harold	Episode: "Dalia Nicole Smith"
2015	Fear the Walking Dead	Old Man	Episode: "Pilot"
2015–2016	Con Man	Dale	3 episodes
2016	Starship Excelsior	Subcommander Tal	Episode: "Tomorrow's Excelsior"
2017	OVER & OUT	Mr. Grossman	Television film
2017	The Guest Book	Walter	5 episodes

=== Video games ===
Year	Title	Role	Notes
1999	The Book of Watermarks	Prospero	
