= Alun Williams =

Welsh radio presenter

Alun Williams OBE
- Born: 26 August 1920; Port Talbot, Wales
- Died: 30 March 1992 (aged 71)
- Education: Cardiff University (BA); University of Wales Trinity Saint David (PhD)
- Occupation: Radio presenter
- Employer: BBC
- Spouse: Perrie Hopkin Morris

David Alun Williams, OBE (26 August 1920 – 30 March 1992) was a Welsh radio presenter who became one of the best known voices on BBC radio when he commentated on events such as the Coronation in 1953 and sports events including rugby, swimming and the Olympic Games.

== Life and career ==
Alun Williams was born in Port Talbot, South Wales, the son of a Presbyterian minister. He was educated at Llandeilo Grammar School, Pontypridd Grammar School and University College, Cardiff. He then served in the Royal Navy, rising from ordinary seaman to become an intelligence officer serving in the Far East.

He began his broadcasting career when he was a student and after working as an outside broadcast assistant became a commentator for the BBC. He introduced many successful radio programmes in the 1950s including Welsh Rarebit and Workers' Playtime, and went on to present a number of long-running programmes in both English and Welsh on Radio Wales and Radio Cymru including Dewch am Dro, One Good Turn, On the Road, Monday Morning Miscellany, Alun yn Galw and Shw Mai Heno.

He was a familiar face on television in Wales and for many years was one of the presenters of Come Dancing.

He was a member of the Gorsedd with the pseudonym 'Crwydryn' (Wanderer) – a reference to the extensive travelling he undertook during his career, touring with the Welsh rugby team and British Lions, presenting Forces' Chance and covering the Olympic and Commonwealth Games.

He was made an officer of the Order of the British Empire (OBE) for services to broadcasting in the 1982 Birthday Honours.

He was married to Perrie Hopkin Morris, daughter of Liberal MP Sir Rhys Hopkin Morris and his wife Gwladys.
