= Thomas Dekker (actor) =

American actor

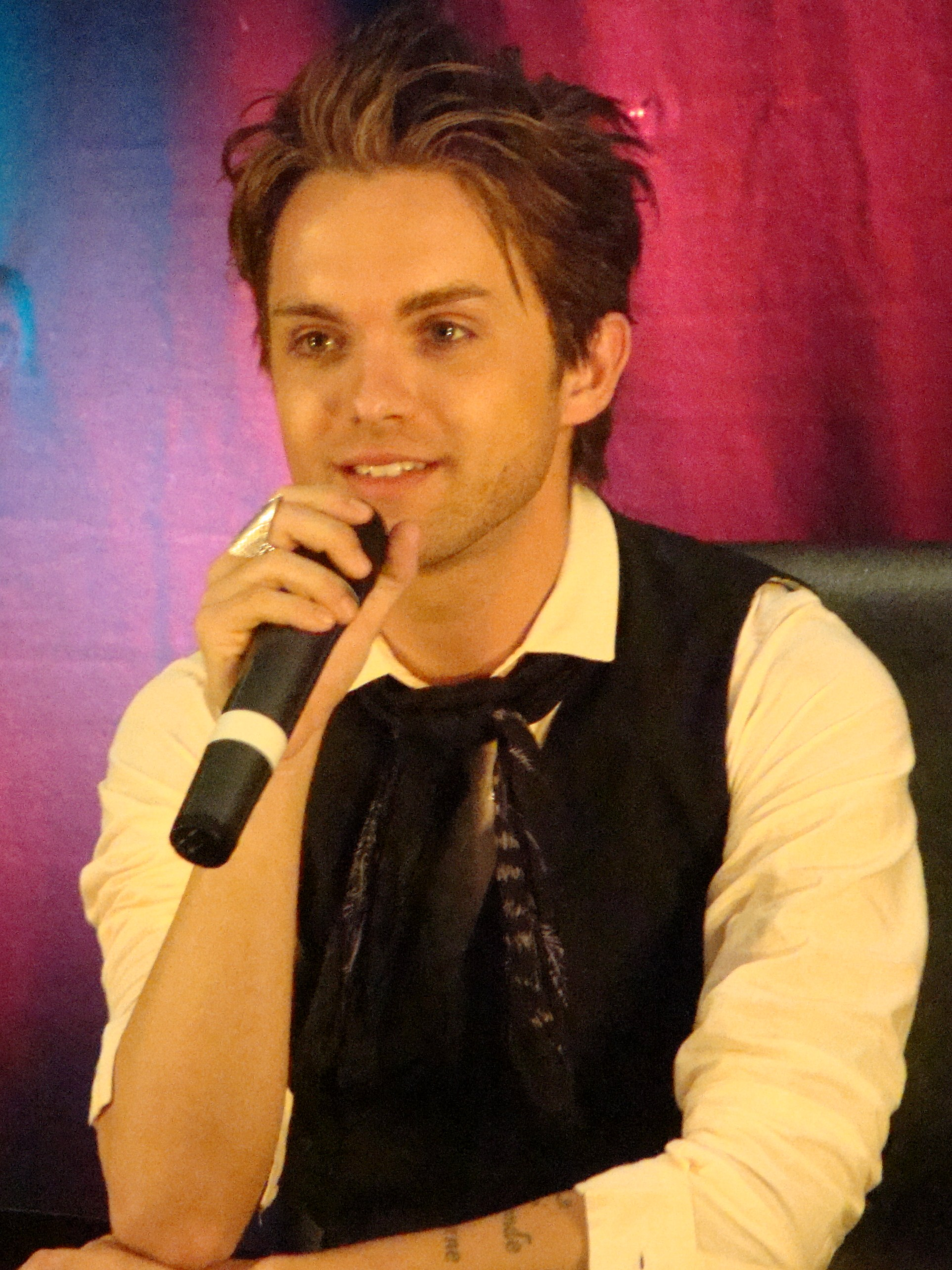
- Dekker in 2010
- Born: Thomas Alexander Dekker; December 28, 1987 (age 38); Las Vegas, Nevada, United States
- Occupations: Actor; musician; singer; director; producer
- Years active: 1993–present
- Spouse: Jesse Haddock (m. 2017)
- Relatives: Alun Williams (grandfather)

Thomas Alexander Dekker (born December 28, 1987) is an American actor, musician, singer, director, and producer. He is known for his roles as John Connor in Terminator: The Sarah Connor Chronicles, Adam Conant on The Secret Circle, and Zach on Heroes.

Dekker did the voice of Littlefoot in The Land Before Time V-IX (singing voice in The Land Before Time V) and as Fievel Mousekewitz in An American Tail: The Treasure of Manhattan Island and An American Tail: The Mystery of the Night Monster. Dekker portrayed Jesse Braun in the 2010 remake of A Nightmare on Elm Street and Smith in Gregg Araki's film Kaboom. Dekker starred as Gregory Valentine in the TV show Backstrom.

Dekker has also written, produced and self-published online his three electronica albums.

== Early life ==
Dekker was born in Las Vegas, Nevada. His mother, Hilary (née Williams), is a concert pianist, acting coach, actor, and singer from Wales, and his late father, David John Ellis Dekker, was an American artist, set designer, opera singer, and actor of English and Dutch ancestry. His maternal grandfather was Alun Williams, a radio broadcaster for the British Broadcasting Corporation. As a child, he and his parents moved all over the world, including to his mother's native United Kingdom and Canada.

== Career ==
=== Early career ===
Starting his acting career at age six, Dekker was first seen in the soap The Young and the Restless. He then appeared in Star Trek Generations, two episodes of Star Trek: Voyager and the film Village of the Damned (1995). Dekker also appeared as a child actor on Seinfeld (season 5, episode 16, 1994) and as Bobby (season 7, episode 4, 1995). In 1997, he became a regular on the Disney Channel show Honey, I Shrunk the Kids: The TV Show, portraying Nick Szalinski. After the show ended in 2000, he went on to appear on Run of the House, Fillmore!, CSI: Crime Scene Investigation, House, Boston Public, Reba and 7th Heaven. He appeared in films such as Campus Confidential and An American Tail: The Mystery of the Night Monster. Dekker has won three Young Artist Awards for his work in The Land Before Time films and one for his guest appearance on Boston Public. In 2001, he played the part of young Donny Osmond in the film Inside the Osmonds.

=== 2006–present ===
In 2006, Dekker landed a recurring role on Heroes playing the character of Zach (Claire Bennet's best friend). He played Zach for eleven episodes before leaving Heroes to take a starring role in Fox's new show Terminator: The Sarah Connor Chronicles as John Connor, starring opposite Lena Headey and Summer Glau. That show debuted January 13, 2008, and was canceled on May 18, 2009. Dekker also played the lead character Nate Palmer in the web-based science fiction series IQ-145.

In 2009, Dekker appeared in From Within (filmed in 2007), My Sister's Keeper, a drama in which he starred with Cameron Diaz, Alec Baldwin, Abigail Breslin and Medium star Sofia Vassilieva, and Laid to Rest alongside Lena Headey. In 2010, Dekker starred in the remake of A Nightmare on Elm Street, released on April 30, 2010. His character's name was Jesse Braun, loosely based on the character Rod Lane in the original. That same year he also had a role in All About Evil, an indie horror film.

Dekker starred in Gregg Araki's Kaboom (2010). It is the first film ever awarded the Cannes Film Festival "Queer Palm Award" for its contribution to LGBT presence in cinema. Dekker was a "top candidate" for the lead role in Paramount's remake of Footloose (2011), but the role went to Kenny Wormald. In April 2011, Dekker starred as Lance Loud in the HBO original film Cinema Verite, about the creation of America's first reality television series, An American Family. Dekker played the role of Adam, the male lead on the television series The Secret Circle developed by The CW.

He appeared in Daughtry's music video for their single "Waiting for Superman", which was released September 17, 2013.

Dekker was a regular on the 2015 Fox crime drama Backstrom, playing Gregory Valentine, the gay underworld contact and roommate of Rainn Wilson's title character, revealed to be his half-brother.

== Music ==
Dekker was brought up with a musical background, and started writing music at age ten while living in Canada. At the age of fifteen he landed a record deal; however after feeling that he wasn't as involved in the music as he would have liked, he left to concentrate on making his own music. At the age of sixteen, Dekker started writing and producing his own classical music influenced by electronica which he describes as "electrofolk". His debut album Psyanotic was released in 2008.

== Personal life ==
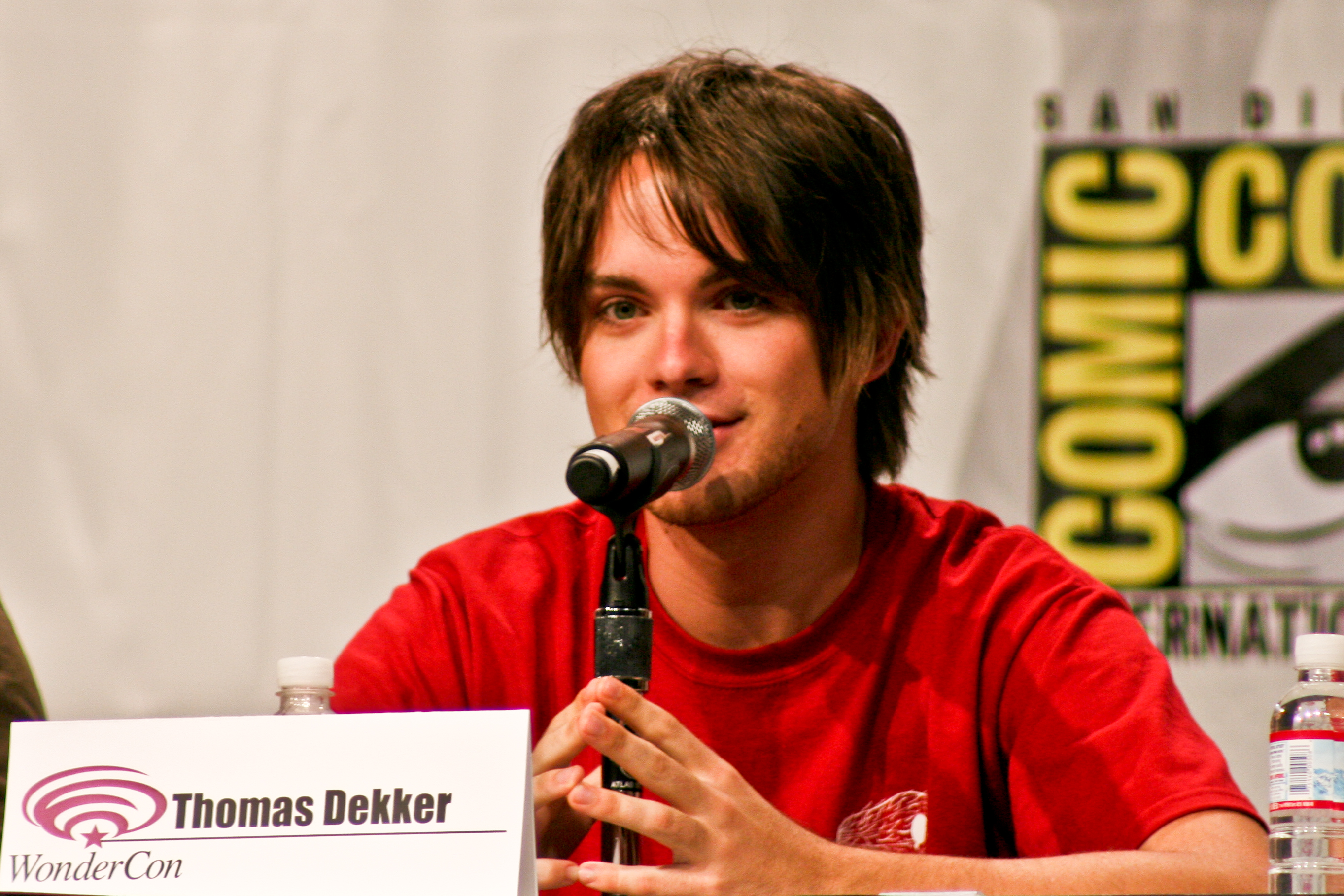
Dekker on a panel at the 2008 Comic-Con

Dekker has stated that for much of his childhood, he was a victim of sexual molestation. In his teenage years, he was part of a "metalhead" subculture, where he "caused trouble in Las Vegas," and was arrested "five or six times."

Dekker was involved in an auto accident on October 15, 2009, when he hit a 17-year-old cyclist training for a race on a freeway onramp. Originally charged with two counts of felony DUI, the charge was reduced to one count of misdemeanor reckless driving when it was found that the cyclist was at fault. He pleaded no contest, and was sentenced to a fine of $300 and two years of informal probation, and ordered to attend a 12-hour alcohol-education class.

Dekker is a vegan.

On April 20, 2011, in an interview with Out magazine Dekker spoke about his sexuality, which had been the subject of speculation:

I've only really had relationships with women, but I'm certainly not closed to it. If there are possibilities of being able to do anything in life, why would you say you would never take any up? In the later chunk of my teen years I was so all over the place with sex. It was terrible. I never really had a real relationship at all. During puberty, it's all about sex, and it's all about figuring yourself out. I think I overdid it when I was younger.

On July 13, 2017, Dekker came out as gay and revealed that he married Canadian actor Jesse Haddock in April that year.

== Awards ==
- Young Artist Award — Best Performance in a TV Comedy Series — Leading Young Actor (Honey, I Shrunk the Kids: The TV Show) (1997)
- Young Artist Award — Best Performance in a Voice-Over: TV/Film/Video — Young Actor (An American Tail: The Mystery of the Night Monster) (1999)
- Young Artist Award — Best Performance in a TV Series — Guest Starring Young Actor (Boston Public) (2000)
- Young Artist Award — Best Performance in a Voice-Over Role (The Land Before Time IX: Journey to the Big Water) (2002)

== Filmography ==
=== Film ===
Year	Title	Role	Notes
1994	Star Trek Generations	Thomas Picard	Credited as Thomas Alexander Dekker
1995	Village of the Damned	David McGowan	
1997	The Land Before Time V: The Mysterious Island	Littlefoot	Singing voice
1998	An American Tail: The Treasure of Manhattan Island	Fievel Mousekewitz	Voice
1998	The Land Before Time VI: The Secret of Saurus Rock	Littlefoot	Voice
1999	An American Tail: The Mystery of the Night Monster	Fievel Mousekewitz	Voice
2000	The Land Before Time VII: The Stone of Cold Fire	Littlefoot	Voice
2001	The Land Before Time VIII: The Big Freeze	Littlefoot	Voice
2002	Help, I'm a Boy!	Mickey (voice)	English version
2002	The Land Before Time IX: Journey to Big Water	Littlefoot (voice)	
2006	Simple Joys	Stephen	Short film
2007	The War Prayer	The Singer	Short film
2008	From Within	Aidan	
2008	Whore	Tom	Writer, director, producer, and editor
2009	Laid to Rest	Tommy	
2009	My Sister's Keeper	Taylor Ambrose	
2010	A Nightmare on Elm Street	Jesse Braun	
2010	All About Evil	Steven	
2010	Kaboom	Smith	
2011	Angels Crest	Ethan	
2011	ChromeSkull: Laid to Rest 2	Tommy	
2011	Foreverland	Bobby	
2012	The Good Lie	Cullen Francis	Main role
2013	Plush	Jack St. Claire	
2013	Enter the Dangerous Mind	Jake	
2014	Lost in the White City	Kyle	
2014	Squatters	Jonas	Main role
2015	Fear Clinic	Blake	
2016	Do You Take This Man	Bradley	
2016	Jack Goes Home	N/A	Writer, producer, and director
2016	Welcome to Willits	Klaus	
2019	Miss Bala	Justin	
2021	Body Brokers	Jacko	
2023	Little Dixie	Clarke Moore	
2027	The Life Golden	TBA (Post-production)	

=== Television ===
Year	Title	Role	Notes
1993	The Young and the Restless	Phillip Chancellor IV	
1994	The Nanny	J.B. Bingington's Son	Episode: "The Show Must Go On"
1994–1995	Seinfeld	Porter / Son; Bobby	2 episodes
1995	Star Trek: Voyager	Henry Burleigh	2 episodes
1996	Caroline in the City	Young Richard	Episode: "Caroline and the Therapist"
1997	The Weird Al Show	Son	Episode: "Back to School"
1997	Men in Black: The Series	Timmy (voice)	Episode: "The Buzzard Syndrome"
1997	Extreme Ghostbusters	Frankie, Kevin Rivera (voice)	2 episodes
1997–2000	Honey, I Shrunk the Kids: The TV Show	Nick Szalinski	Main cast (seasons 1-3)
2000	Touched by an Angel	Dennis	Episode: "The Invitation"
2000	Grosse Pointe	Leslie Bicks	Episode: "Boys on the Side"
2001	Inside the Osmonds	Young Donny Osmond	Television film
2001	Family Guy	Student (voice)	Episode: "The Thin White Line"
2001–2003	Jackie Chan Adventures	Young Valmont (voice)	2 episodes
2002	The Mummy	Simon Montgomery (voice)	Episode: "The Puzzle"
2002	Family Affair	Jeremy	Episode: "No Small Parts"
2003	Run of the House	Seth	Episode: "The Party"
2003	Fillmore!	Crockett, Biggie, James Heron (voice)	3 episodes
2003	Boston Public	Julien McNeal	2 episodes
2004	CSI: Crime Scene Investigation	Jimmy Jones	Episode: "Harvest"
2005	7th Heaven	Vincent	9 episodes
2005	Campus Confidential	Brett	Television film
2005	Reba	Buzzer	Episode: "Issues"
2006	House	Boyd	Episode: "House vs. God"
2006	Shark	Ben Channing	Episode: "Love Triangle"
2006–2007	Heroes	Zach	12 episodes
2008	Psi-Kix	Jacque (voice)	
2008	IQ-145	Nate Palmer	10 episodes
2008–2009	Terminator: The Sarah Connor Chronicles	John Connor	Main cast (seasons 1-2)
2011	Elvira's Movie Macabre	Elrick / Jack Shemansky	Episode: "Lady Frankenstein"
2011	Cinema Verite	Lance Loud	
2011–2012	The Secret Circle	Adam Conant	Main cast
2015	Backstrom	Gregory Valentine	Main role
2022	The Rookie: Feds	Jeffrey Boyle	Recurring role
2022	The Rookie	Jeffrey Boyle	Recurring role
2022	Swimming with Sharks	Travis	
2023	Star Trek: Picard	Titus Rikka	Episode: "Seventeen Seconds"
2024	Ark: The Animated Series	Lawrence (voice)	2 episodes
2026	X-Men '97	Quentin Quire (voice)	

=== Video games ===
Year	Title	Role	Notes
2026	Grand Theft Auto VI	The Local Population	

=== Music videos ===
Year	Title	Role	Notes
2013	"Waiting for Superman"	The Hero	Main role

== Discography ==
=== Albums ===
- Psyanotic (2008)
- Into the Night (2018)
- Tasma (2021)
- Serpentine (2025)

=== Soundtracks ===
- From The Land Before Time V: The Mysterious Island:
  - 1997: "Friends for Dinner", "Always There", "Big Water"
- From An American Tail: The Treasure of Manhattan Island:
  - 1998: "Anywhere in Your Dreams"
- From The Land Before Time VI: The Secret of Saurus Rock:
  - 1998: "Bad Luck", "The Legend of the Lone Dinosaur", "On Your Own"
- From An American Tail: The Mystery of the Night Monster:
  - 1999: "Get the Facts", "Who Will"
- From The Land Before Time VII: The Stone of Cold Fire:
  - 2000: "Beyond the Mysterious Beyond", "Good Inside"
- From The Land Before Time VIII: The Big Freeze:
  - 2001: "Family", "The Lesson"
- From The Land Before Time IX: Journey to the Big Water:
  - 2002: "Imaginary Friends", "No One Has to Be Alone", "Chanson D'Ennui", "Big Water"
- From 7th Heaven:
  - From the episode Red Socks
  - 2005: "Ac-Cent-Tchu-Ate the Positive"
  - 2008: "From Within"
