= Peaches Christ =

American underground drag performer, emcee, filmmaker, and actor

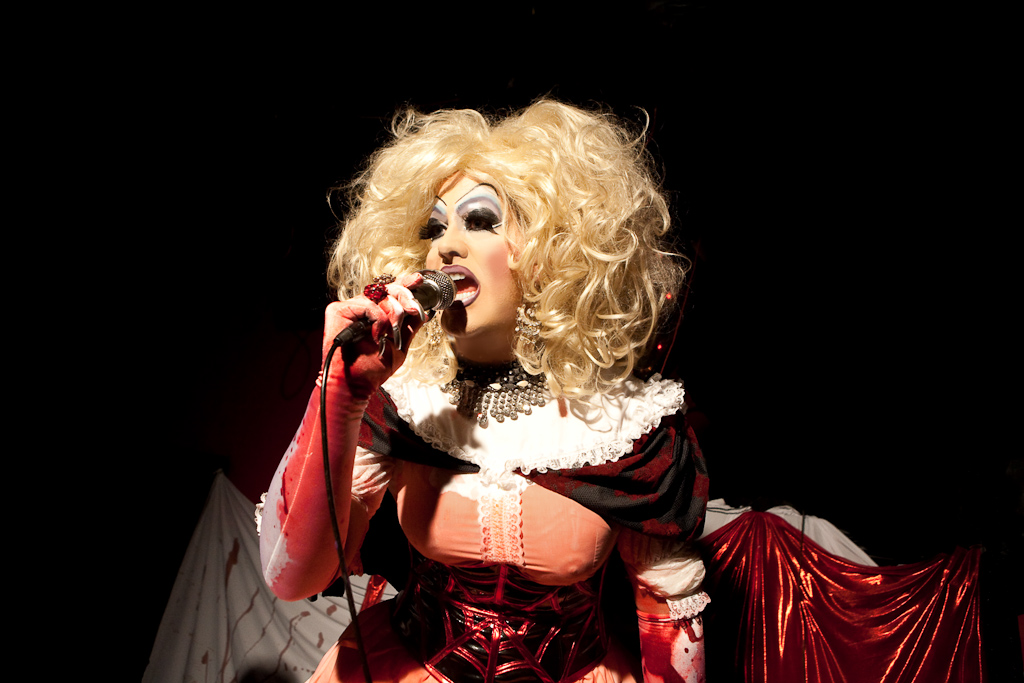
- Peaches Christ at the Cat Club for the Trannyshack-Midnight Mass Halloween party, San Francisco, 2009
- Born: Joshua Grannell; January 7, 1974 (age 52); Washington D.C., U.S.
- Education: Pennsylvania State University
- Occupations: Actor, emcee, filmmaker, performer
- Years active: 1996–present
- Website: http://www.peacheschrist.com

Peaches Christ (stage name for Joshua Grannell; born January 7, 1974) is an American underground drag performer, emcee, filmmaker, and actor. Peaches currently resides in San Francisco where her Backlash Production Company and Midnight Mass movie series are based. Grannell studied film at Penn State University, where his senior thesis film Jizzmopper: A Love Story, about a janitor at an adult video store, won the audience award at the annual Penn State Student Film Festival. Grannell developed the Peaches Christ character during the production of this film.

Her Midnight Mass road-show and Short Film Retrospective have been on tour and appeared in Seattle, Berkeley, New York City, Brussels, Belgium, and Lausanne, Switzerland.

On September 7, 2007, the San Francisco de Young Museum hosted a "Decade of Peaches Christ Retrospective" called Cattychism featuring artistic contributions inspired by Peaches. The event included ten years of costume design by long-time collaborator Tria Connell and ten years of graphic design by artist Chris Hatfield.

== Early life ==
Joshua Grannell was born on January 7, 1974, in Washington, DC. and raised in Annapolis, Maryland in a Roman Catholic family. He attended St. Mary's High School in Annapolis, and subsequently studied at Pennsylvania State University, where he earned a bachelor's degree in filmmaking.

== Midnight Mass ==
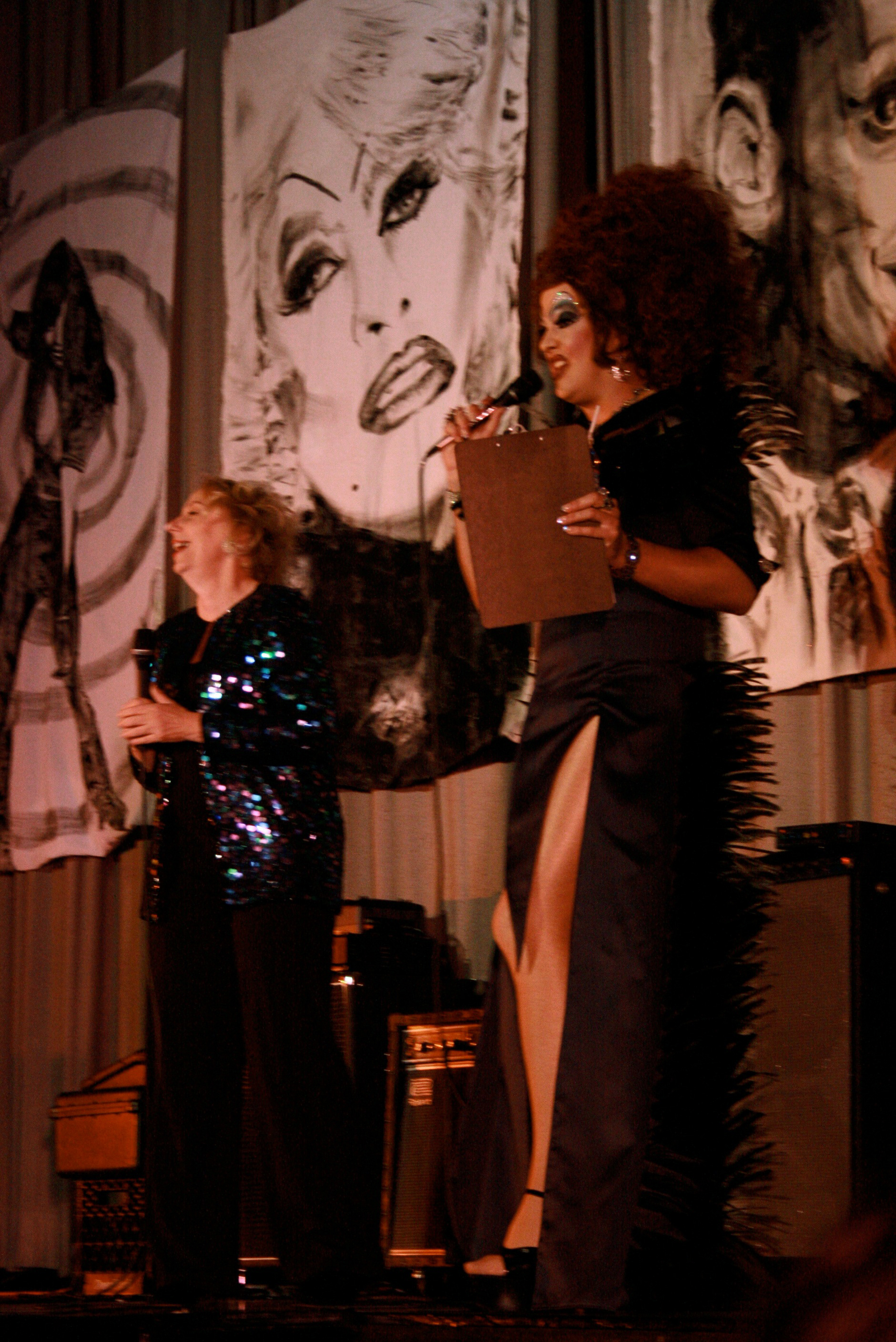
Peaches Christ at a Midnight Mass showing of Desperate Living with Mink Stole.

Midnight Mass is a popular San Francisco midnight movie event series begun in the summer of 1998 at the movie theater that Joshua Grannell/Peaches Christ managed, The Landmark Theatres Bridge Theater in San Francisco, California. The elaborate pre-show stage productions, guest stars, and drag spectacles continue to draw sell-out crowds. Special guest stars have included Mink Stole, Tura Satana, Mary Woronov, RuPaul, Erica Gavin, Patrick Bristow, Cassandra Peterson (Elvira, Mistress of the Dark), John Waters, and more. The summer of 2009 marked the 12th and final season of Midnight Mass showing at The Bridge.

== Stage and screen ==
The 10th-Annual Season of Peaches Christ's Midnight Mass stage-show was filmed for a national television show airing on the HDnet Movie Channel executive produced by Mark Cuban. The six-part series is titled Midnight Mass with your Hostess Peaches Christ. The thirty-minute episodes centered around Peaches and Midnight Mass preceding televised film screenings. Peaches has appeared on other television productions, including VH1's Totally Gay!, AMC's Movies That Shook the World: Pink Flamingos, and IFC's Cult Movies pilot. Peaches is prominently featured as a protesting drag queen in Gus Van Sant's feature film Milk.

Peaches tours with her short film collection and presents it as part of "An Evening With Peaches Christ". It is a multi-media show that includes live singing, and the screening of her short films.

Peaches appears in numerous other films as well, including Spin the Bottle, a "drag-umentary" send-up of Madonna: Truth or Dare chronicling life behind the scenes at Midnight Mass. The film was written by Grannell and directed by San Francisco filmmaker Scott Boswell. Peaches Christ co-produced the San Francisco Underground Short Film Festival with performance artist and musician Vinsantos. The fest is designed to showcase talented and overlooked Bay Area Filmmakers. In 2005, Peaches released her debut CD single "Idol Worship". Peaches continues to appear on the Trannyshack stage where she got her start in 1996. Christ regularly guest emcees the show, substituting for hostess Heklina. He also directed the Indie horror flick All About Evil, which stars Natasha Lyonne, Thomas Dekker, Cassandra Peterson, Mink Stole, Noah Segan, Jack Donner, Julie Caitlin Brown and Patrick Bristow.

== Personal life ==
Grannell is openly gay. Her brother is also gay and she has a sister who works with Robert Gallo. He married Nihat Karaarslan in 2023.

She has ADHD and is the drag mother of Bob The Drag Queen.

== Filmography ==
- Season of the Troll (2001)
- A Nightmare on Castro Street (2002)
- Whatever Happened to Peaches Christ? (2004)
- All About Evil (2010)
