= Ray of Light Theatre =

Theater Company

Ray of Light Theatre is a musical theatre company in San Francisco, California. It performs at The Barbary Stage in Jackson Square.

== History ==
Ray of Light Theatre was founded by artistic director Shane Ray and board co-chair Adrienne Abrams in 2000.

Production highlights & honors:

In 2005, 2 Broke Girls star Beth Behrs appeared as Sandy Dumbrowski in the musical Grease.

In 2005, ROLT produced Bat Boy: The Musical, directed by James Monroe Iglehart.

In 2009, the month-long run of The Who's Tommy garnered six Bay Area Theatre Critics Circle Awards (of eleven nods).

In 2011, the ROLT production of Assassins was nominated for 13 BATCC awards, winning 8, including Best Musical.

In 2012, the ROLT production of Sweeney Todd was nominated for 6 BATCC awards, winning best featured actress.

In 2015, ROLT produced the Bay Area Premiere of Heathers the Musical and worked with writers Tim Maner, Steven Cheslik-deMeyer and Alan Stevens Hewitt on producing Lizzie the Musical. In the 2016 season ROLT received good reviews in the San Francisco Chronicle for The Wild Party (Lippa Musical). The same paper's critic praised the 2024 production of Legally Blonde, presenting it as an example for a "fluffy musical" that nonetheless communicates "a key political point."
