= List of Drag Race España contestants =

Drag Race España premiered in 2021. It has crowned five winners: Carmen Farala, Sharonne, Pitita, Le Cocó and Satín Greco.

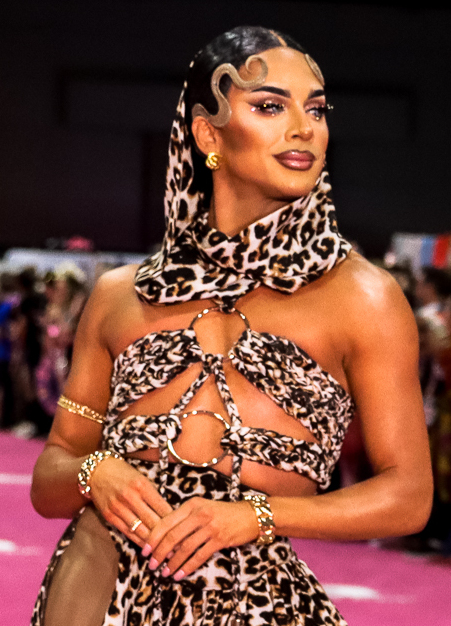
Season 1 winner
Carmen Farala

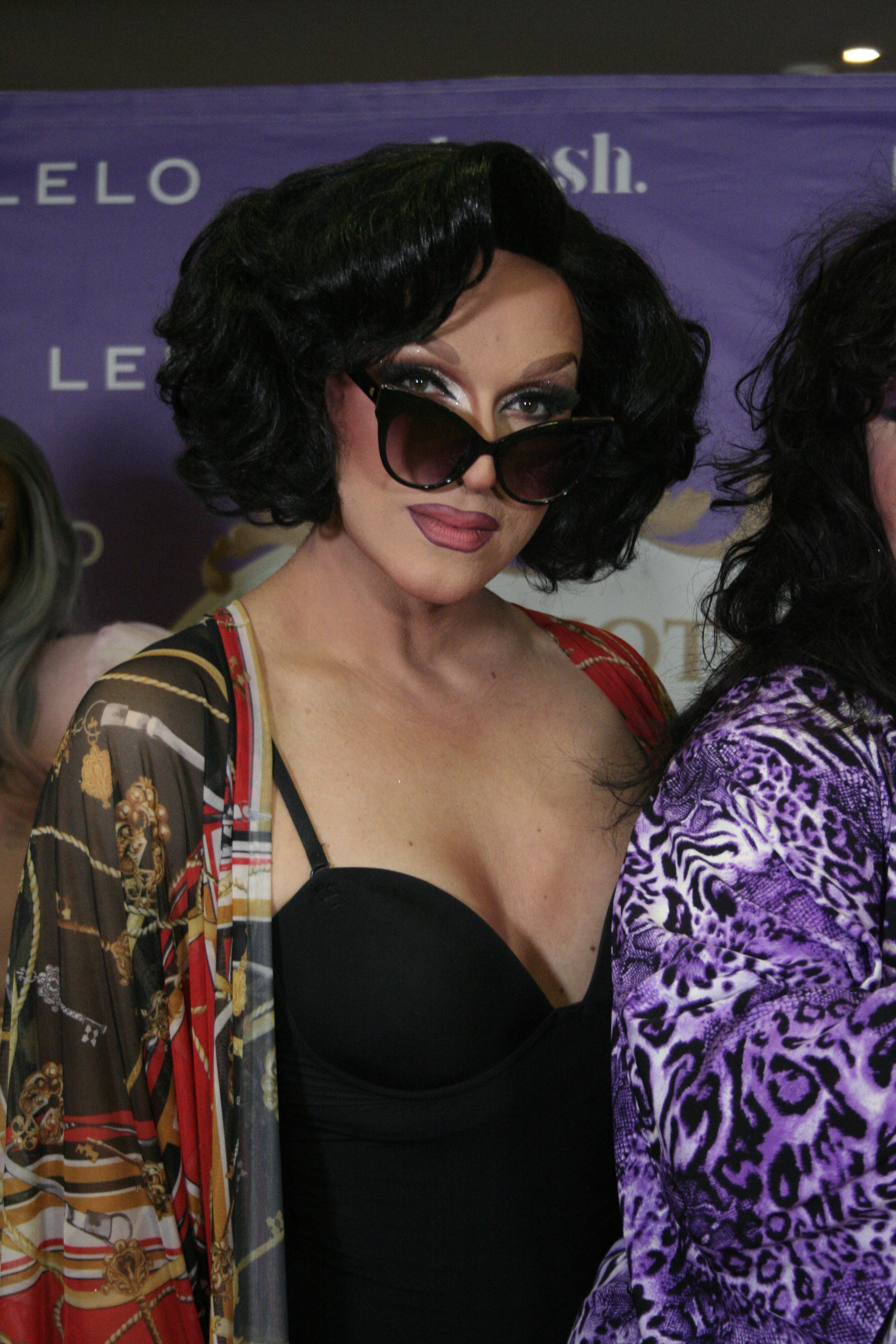
Season 2 winner
Sharonne

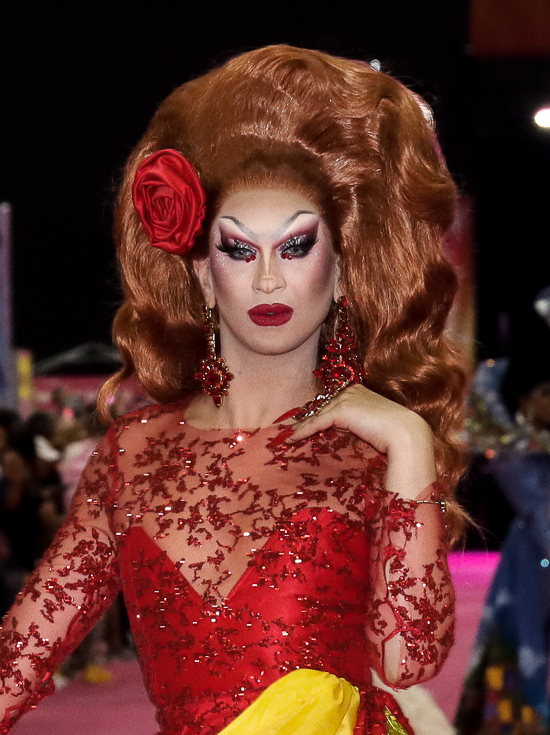
Season 3 winner
Pitita

== List of contestants ==
Legend:

The contestant won the season.
The contestant was voted the local equivalent of Miss Congeniality either on or off screen.
The contestant came back to compete after being either removed or eliminated in a previous season.
The contestant quit the competition.

Contestants of Drag Race España and their backgrounds
Season	Contestant	Age	Hometown	Outcome
1	Carmen Farala	31	Seville, Andalusia	Winner
1	Killer Queen	31	Madrid, Community of Madrid	Runners-up
1	Sagittaria	22	Barcelona, Catalonia	Runners-up
1	Pupi Poisson	38	Madrid, Community of Madrid	4th (Note: The contestant was voted Miss Congeniality or similar.)
1	Dovima Nurmi	24	Barcelona, Catalonia	5th
1	Hugáceo Crujiente	25	Valencia, Valencian Community	6th
1	Arantxa Castilla-La Mancha	23	Badajoz, Extremadura	7th
1	Inti	20	Antwerp, Belgium	8th (Note: The contestant quit the competition.)
1	Drag Vulcano	30	Las Palmas, Canary Islands	9th
1	The Macarena	29	San Fernando, Andalusia	10th
2	Sharonne	45	Barcelona, Catalonia	Winner
2	Estrella Xtravaganza	25	Jerez de la Frontera, Andalusia	Runners-up
2	Venedita Von Däsh	30	Elche, Valencian Community	Runners-up
2	Marina	34	Barcelona, Catalonia	4th
2	Juriji der Klee	31	Brussels, Belgium	5th
2	Drag Sethlas	30	Las Palmas, Canary Islands	6th
2	Diamante Merybrown	25	Santiago de los Caballeros, Dominican Republic	7th
2	Onyx (Note: Now Onyx Unleashed, she is referred to as Onyx on season 2.)	33	Madrid, Community of Madrid	8th
2	Jota Carajota	18	Jerez de la Frontera, Andalusia	9th
2	Samantha Ballentines	35	San Fernando, Andalusia	10th
2	Ariel Rec	33	Madrid, Community of Madrid	11th
2	Marisa Prisa	28	Lugo, Galicia	12th
3	Pitita	27	Barcelona, Catalonia	Winner
3	Vania Vainilla	39	Zaragoza, Aragon	Runner-up
3	Hornella Góngora	35	Alicante, Valencian Community	3rd (Note: Kelly Roller originally placed tenth before re-entering the competition.)
3	Kelly Roller	30	Torremolinos, Andalusia	3rd
3	Clover Bish	24	Barcelona, Catalonia	5th
3	Bestiah	30	Leganés, Community of Madrid	6th
3	Pakita (Note: Now Pakita, she is referred to as Fransiska Tólika on The Switch Drag Race season 2.) (Note: The contestant returned after having competed on a different franchise.)	28	Seville, Andalusia	7th
3	Pink Chadora	38	Málaga, Andalusia	7th
3	Visa	34	Tampico, Mexico	9th
3	The Macarena (Note: The contestant returned to compete after being eliminated on a previous season.)	31	San Fernando, Andalusia	10th
3	Chanel Anorex	31	Salamanca, Castile and León	11th
3	Drag Chuchi	32	Las Palmas, Canary Islands	12th
3	María Edilia	41	Caracas, Venezuela	13th
4	Le Cocó	28	Madrid, Community of Madrid	Winner
4	Vampirashian (Note: Now La Bella Vampi, she is referred to as Vampirashian on the show up until the last episode.)	30	Valencia, Valencian Community	Runner-up
4	Chloe Vittu	23	Barcelona, Catalonia	3rd
4	La Niña Delantro	22	Castellón de la Plana, Valencian Community	4th
4	Mariana Stars	28	Mérida, Venezuela	5th
4	Megui Yeillow	31	Écija, Andalusia	6th
4	Angelita La Perversa	44	Seville, Andalusia	7th
4	Miss Khristo	31	Madrid, Community of Madrid	8th
4	Kelly Passa!?	38	Madrid, Community of Madrid	9th
4	Dita Dubois	37	Tenerife, Canary Islands	10th
4	Porca Theclubkid	39	Madrid, Community of Madrid	11th
4	Shani LaSanta	25	Jerez de la Frontera, Andalusia	12th
5	Satín Greco	39	Torremolinos, Andalusia	Winner
5	Margarita Kalifata	32	Córdoba, Andalusia	Runner-up
5	Laca Udilla	27	Valencia, Valencian Community	3rd
5	Nix	29	Copenhagen, Denmark	3rd
5	Dafne Mugler	20	Málaga, Andalusia	5th
5	Alexandra del Raval	27	Barcelona, Catalonia	6th
5	Ferrxn	27	Valencia, Valencian Community	7th
5	Denébola Murnau	23	Elche, Valencian Community	8th
5	Krystal Forever	52	Caracas, Venezuela	9th
5	La Escándalo	26	Valencia, Valencian Community	10th
5	Eva Harrington	27	Tenerife, Canary Islands	10th
5	Nori	28	Mérida, Extremadura	12th
6	Alma DeSoul	35	Málaga, Andalusia	TBA
6	Buba Anorex	32	Madrid, Community of Madrid	TBA
6	Coco Luna	32	Venezuela	TBA
6	Kim Miller	22	Vigo, Galicia	TBA
6	Maitetxu Mia	47	Barcelona, Catalonia	TBA
6	Sorny	31	Madrid, Community of Madrid	TBA
6	Liak	33	Murcia, Region of Murcia	7th
6	Vanessa Artiles	33	Las Palmas, Canary Islands	8th
6	Marcus Massalami	35	Madrid, Community of Madrid	9th
6	Liz Dust	39	Valencia, Valencian Community	10th
6	Joan Chevalier	27	Málaga, Andalusia	11th
6	Àlex Marteen	35	Barcelona, Catalonia	12th
