= Drag Race España season 4 =

Fourth season of 'Drag Race España'

Drag Race España
- Season 4
- Promotional poster for season four
- Hosted by: Supremme de Luxe
- Judges: Supremme de Luxe; Ana Locking; Javier Ambrossi; Javier Calvo
- No. of contestants: 12
- Winner: Le Cocó
- Runner-up: La Bella Vampi
- Miss Congeniality: Dita Dubois
- No. of episodes: 12

Release
- Original network: ATRESplayer Premium (Spain); WOW Presents Plus (International)
- Original release: 22 September – 15 December 2024

Season chronology
- ← Previous; Season 3 Next → Season 5

The fourth season of Drag Race España premiered on 22 September 2024, on ATRESplayer Premium in Spain and on WOW Presents Plus internationally.

== Contestants ==
Ages, names, and cities stated are at time of filming.

Contestants of Drag Race España season 4 and their backgrounds
Contestant	Age	Hometown	Outcome
Le Cocó	28	Madrid, Community of Madrid	Winner
La Bella Vampi (Note: La Bella Vampi is known as Vampirashian until the season finale.)	30	Valencia, Valencian Community	Runner-up
Chloe Vittu	23	Barcelona, Catalonia	3rd place
La Niña Delantro	22	Castellón de la Plana, Valencian Community	4th place
Mariana Stars	28	Mérida, Venezuela	5th place
Megui Yeillow	31	Seville, Andalusia	6th place
Angelita La Perversa	44	Seville, Andalusia	7th place
Miss Khristo	31	Madrid, Community of Madrid	8th place
Kelly Passa!?	38	Barcelona, Catalonia	9th place
Dita Dubois	37	Tenerife, Canary Islands	10th place (Note: Dita Dubois was voted Miss Congeniality by fellow contestants.)
Porca Theclubkid	39	Valencia, Valencian Community	11th place
Shani LaSanta	25	Cádiz, Andalusia	12th place

== Contestants progress ==
Legend:

Le Cocó won Drag Race España season 4.
La Bella Vampi was the runner-up.
Dita Dubois was voted Miss Congeniality (Miss C) by fellow contestants.
Porca Theclubkid won Miss Lost Look (MLL) for having the best unaired look of the season.
La Niña Delantro won Miss Make-Up (MMU) for having the best makeup of the season.
WIN indicates that the contestant won the challenge.
SAFE indicates that the contestant was declared safe by the judges.
RSU (Reina de la Suerte) indicates that La Bella Vampi was up for elimination, was revealed to possess the Reina de la Suerte and was saved from lip syncing by switching with La Niña Delantro.
STAY indicates that the contestant's individual performance earned enough points from the judges and the eliminated contestants to move to the final lip sync.
BTM (Bottom) indicates that the contestant was up for elimination.
ELIM (Eliminated) indicates that the contestant was eliminated.
Guest indicates that the contestant returned as a guest.

Contestants progress with placements in each episode
Contestant	Episode											
Contestant	1	2	3	4	5	6	7	8	9	10	11	12
Le Cocó	SAFE	SAFE	SAFE	SAFE	SAFE	SAFE	WIN	WIN	BTM	Guest	STAY	Winner
La Bella Vampi	SAFE	SAFE	SAFE	SAFE	SAFE	WIN	RSU	SAFE	SAFE	Guest	STAY	Runner-up
Chloe Vittu	SAFE	SAFE	SAFE	SAFE	SAFE	BTM	SAFE	SAFE	WIN	Guest	STAY	Eliminated
La Niña Delantro	BTM	SAFE	SAFE	WIN	SAFE	BTM	BTM	SAFE	SAFE	MMU	ELIM	Guest
Mariana Stars	SAFE	SAFE	BTM	SAFE	WIN	SAFE	SAFE	BTM	ELIM	Guest	Guest	Guest
Megui Yeillow	SAFE	WIN	SAFE	SAFE	SAFE	SAFE	SAFE	ELIM		Guest	Guest	Guest
Angelita La Perversa	SAFE	SAFE	WIN	BTM	BTM	SAFE	ELIM	Guest		Guest	Guest	Guest
Miss Khristo	WIN	BTM	SAFE	SAFE	ELIM			Guest		Guest	Guest	Guest
Kelly Passa!?	SAFE	SAFE	SAFE	ELIM				Guest		Guest	Guest	Guest
Dita Dubois	SAFE	SAFE	ELIM					Guest		Miss C	Guest	Guest
Porca Theclubkid	SAFE	ELIM						Guest		MLL	Guest	Guest
Shani LaSanta	ELIM							Guest		Guest	Guest	Guest

=== Finale voting results (Episode 11) ===
Voting results
Finalists	Total score	Javier Ambrossi	Ana Locking	Javier Calvo	Supremme De Luxe	Eliminated queens
Le Cocó	56	12	12	10	10	12
La Bella Vampi	54	10	10	12	12	10
Chloe Vittu	38	8	6	8	8	8
La Niña Delantro	32	6	8	6	6	6

== Lip syncs ==
Legend:

The contestant was eliminated after their first time in the bottom.
The contestant was eliminated after their second time in the bottom.
The contestant was eliminated after their third time in the bottom.
The contestant was eliminated after each finalist performed an individual lip sync.
The contestant won the Lip Sync for the Crown and was declared the winner of the season.

Episode	Bottom contestants			Song	Eliminated
1	La Niña Delantro	vs.	Shani LaSanta	"Las 12" (Ana Mena, Belinda)	Shani LaSanta
2	Miss Khristo	vs.	Porca Theclubkid	"Cuando zarpa el amor" (Camela)	Porca Theclubkid
3	Dita Dubois	vs.	Mariana Stars	"Loca" (Malena Gracia)	Dita Dubois
4	Angelita La Perversa	vs.	Kelly Passa!?	"Antagonista" (Belén Aguilera)	Kelly Passa!?
5	Angelita La Perversa	vs.	Miss Khristo	"El amor" (Massiel)	Miss Khristo
6	Chloe Vittu	vs.	La Niña Delantro	"Mujer loba" (Melody)	None
7	Angelita La Perversa	vs.	La Niña Delantro (Note: Angelita La Perversa and La Bella Vampi were announced as the bottom two contestants. At the beginning of the lip sync, however, La Bella Vampi revealed to possess the Reina de la Suerte, switching her place with the low placing queen of the week, La Niña Delantro.)	"Puedes contar conmigo" (María Escarmiento)	Angelita La Perversa
8	Mariana Stars	vs.	Megui Yeillow	"Se acabó" (María Jiménez)	Megui Yeillow
9	Le Cocó	vs.	Mariana Stars	"Las Babys" (Aitana)	Mariana Stars
Episode	Semifinalists			Song	Eliminated
11	Chloe Vittu			"Vivir así es morir de amor" (Nathy Peluso)	La Niña Delantro
11	La Niña Delantro			"Going Under" (Evanescence)	La Niña Delantro
11	La Bella Vampi			"Quién te crees que eres tú" (Rocío Jurado)	La Niña Delantro
11	Le Cocó			"El lado izquierdo de la cama" (Natalia Jiménez)	La Niña Delantro
11	Finalists			Song	Eliminated
11	Chloe Vittu vs. La Bella Vampi vs. Le Cocó			"Diva" (Mónica Naranjo)	None
Episode	Final contestants			Song	Winner
12	La Bella Vampi	vs.	Le Cocó	"Va todo al ganador" (Nina)	Le Cocó

== Guest judges ==
Listed in chronological order:

- Boris Izaguirre, writer and television personality
- Manuela Trasobares, singer and politician
- Loles León, actress
- Belén Aguilera, singer
- Valeria Vegas, journalist, essayist, writer, documentary filmmaker and producer
- Melody, singer
- Eduardo Navarrete, fashion designer
- Valeria Ros, screenwriter, TV host and comedian
- Lola Rodríguez, actress and model

=== Special guests ===
Guests who appeared in episodes, but did not judge on the main stage.

Episode 4:

- Leticia Sabater, television presenter, actress, and singer
- Pink Chadora, contestant on Drag Race España season 3 and Drag Race España All Stars season 1
- Carlos Marco, singer and music producer
- Noelia, vocal coach

Episode 5

- Lala Chus, comedian and TV personality
- Ger Sanc, actor and media personality
- Pupi Poisson, contestant on Drag Race España season 1 and Drag Race España All Stars season 1

Episode 6

- Carmelo Segura, choreographer

Episode 10

- Leticia Sabater, television presenter, actress, and singer
- María Edilia, contestant and Miss Congeniality on Drag Race España season 3

Episode 12

- Alyssa Edwards, winner of RuPaul's Drag Race Global All Stars season 1 and contestant on RuPaul's Drag Race season 5 and RuPaul's Drag Race All Stars season 2
- Pitita, winner of Drag Race España season 3

== Episodes ==
No. overall	No. in season	Title	Original release date
32	1	"Travel In Time" "Viaje en el tiempo"	September 22, 2024
Twelve new queens enter the workroom. Supremme de Luxe then reveals the twist of the season: each queen will choose a slice of the Queens' cake, announcing that inside one them there is a Supremme's Reina de la Suerte, which will allow the queen at risk of elimination to avoid to Lip Sync and return to the competition, swapping places with the previously saved queen among the three in the bottom. For the first main challenge, the queens walk the Travel In Time Ball, presenting two looks brought from home and one made in the work room. Categories are Regreso al Pasado (Back to the Past), Salto al Futuro (Jump to the Future) and Mi Segunda Primera Vez (My Second First Time). On the runway, Mariana Stars, Miss Khristo and Vampirashian receive positive critiques, with Miss Khristo winning the challenge. Angelita La Perversa, La Niña Delantro e Shani LaSanta receive negative critiques, with Angelita La Perversa being safe. La Niña Delantro and Shani LaSanta lip-sync to "Las 12" by Ana Mena and Belinda. La Niña Delantro wins the lip-sync and Shani LaSanta is eliminated.: Guest Judge: Boris Izaguirre; Main Challenge: Showcase three looks including one made in the workroom; Runway Themes: Regreso al Pasado (Back to the Past), Salto al Futuro (Jump to the Future) and Mi Segunda Primera Vez (My Second First Time); Challenge Winner: Miss Khristo; Challenge Prize: A €2,500 cash tip and a two-night hotel stay in Valencia; Bottom Two: La Niña Delantro and Shani LaSanta; Lip-Sync Song: "Las 12" by Ana Mena and Belinda; Eliminated: Shani LaSanta; Farewell Message: "Cuidad mucho de mi spot, así come yo cuidaré con cálculos de vosotras, HERMANAS!!! 💋 Shani LS." ("Take good care of my spot, as I'll take good care of you, SISTERS!!!! 💋 Shani LS.")
33	2	"Night of the Stars" "Noche de Estrellas"	September 29, 2024
For the mini-challenge, the queens do an eye-focused look inspired by Manuela Trasobares. La Niña Delantro wins the mini-challenge. For the main challenge, the queens perform in the Supremme Eleganza Talent Extravaganza.: Angelita La Perversa - Lip-sync; Chloe Vittu - Comedy performance / Original song lip-sync; Dita Dubois - Comedy performance; Kelly Passa!? - Live singing; La Niña Delantro - Lip-sync / Dance routine; Le Cocó - Spoken word / Live singing; Mariana Stars - Lip-sync; Megui Yeillow - Lip-sync; Miss Khristo - Dance routine; Porca Theclubkid - Fetish routine; Vampirashian - Live singing; On the runway, category is Barrococó (Baroquecoco). Angelita La Perversa, Le Cocó and Megui Yeillow receive positive critiques, with Megui Yeillow winning the challenge. Dita Dubois, Miss Khristo and Porca Theclubkid receive negative critiques, with Dita Dubois being safe. Miss Khristo and Porca Theclubkid lip-sync to "Cuando zarpa el amor" by Camela. Miss Khristo wins the lip-sync and Porca Theclubkid is eliminated.: Guest Judge: Manuela Trasobares; Mini-Challenge: Create an eye-focused quick drag look; Mini-Challenge Winner: La Niña Delantro; Mini-Challenge Prize: A €1,000 worth case makeup kit from NYX Cosmetics; Main Challenge: Perform in the Supremme Eleganza Talent Extravaganza; Runway Theme: Barrococó (Baroquecoco); Challenge Winner: Megui Yeillow; Challenge Prize: A €2,500 cash tip and a necklace and earrings from Aster LAB; Bottom Two: Miss Khristo and Porca Theclubkid; Lip-Sync Song: "Cuando zarpa el amor" by Camela; Eliminated: Porca Theclubkid; Farewell Message: "Chicxs, sois lo mejor que me ha sucedido en mucho tiempo. OS AMO, PORCA" ("Y'all are the best thing that has happened to me in a long time. I LOVE YOU, PORCA")
34	3	"Aquí No Hay Quien Diva"	October 6, 2024
For the mini-challenge, the queens need to split a melon in half using only a heel. Angelita La Pervers wins the mini-challenge. For the main challenge, the queens act in a drag version of the series "Aquí no hay quien viva" called "Aquí No Hay Quien Diva".: Angelita La Perversa plays Maruca; Chloe Vittu plays Loncha; Dita Dubois plays Paloca; Kelly Passa!? plays Piluca; La Niña Delantro plays Emilia; Le Cocó plays Maurice; Mariana Stars plays Helen; Megui Yeillow plays Brotes; Miss Khristo plays Olivia; Vampirashian plays Josefi; On the runway, category is Historias No Para Dormir (Tales to Keep You Awake). Angelita La Perversa, Kelly Passa!? and Le Cocó receive positive critiques, with Angelita La Perversa winning the challenge. Dita Dubois, La Niña Delantro and Mariana Stars receive negative critiques, with La Niña Delantro being safe. Dita Dubois and Mariana Stars lip-sync to "Loca" by Malena Gracia. Mariana Stars wins the lip-sync and Dita Dubois is eliminated.: Guest Judge: Loles León; Mini-Challenge: Split a melon in half using a heel; Mini-Challenge Winner: Angelita La Perversa; Main Challenge: Act in a parody of the television series Aquí no hay quien viva; Runway Theme: Historias No Para Dormir (Tales to Keep You Awake); Challenge Winner: Angelita La Perversa; Challenge Prize: A €2,500 cash tip and a two-night hotel stay and spa treatment in Torremolinos; Bottom Two: Dita Dubois and Mariana Stars; Lip-Sync Song: "Loca" by Malena Gracia; Eliminated: Dita Dubois; Farewell Message: "SUTILEZA ♡ Cocó, Khristo ♡ Mariana te amo gana por mi 💘" ("SUBTLETY ♡ Cocó, Khristo ♡ Mariana I love you win for me 💘")
35	4	"I'm That Girl from School" "Soy aquella niña de la escuela"	October 13, 2024
For the mini-challenge, the queens perform an aerobics routine alongside Spanish TV host Leticia Sabater. Mariana Stars wins the mini-challenge. For the main challenge, the queens write, record, and perform verses to "Mis Amigas y Yo".: Team Popular Girls as the Sin Pussycat Dolls (No Pussycat Dolls) - La Niña Delantro, Mariana Stars and Vampirashian; Team Weirdos as the Kiss My Ass - Angelita La Perversa, Chloe Vittu and Miss Khristo; Team Nerds as the Dream Nerds - Kelly Passa!?, Le Cocó and Megui Yellow; On the runway, category is La Noche de las 1000 Ana Locking (Night of 1000 Ana Lockings). Team Popular Girls is the winning team, with La Niña Delantro winning the challenge. Angelita La Perversa, Kelly Passa!? and Miss Khristo receive negative critiques, with Miss Khristo being safe. Angelita La Perversa and Kelly Passa!? lip-sync to "Antagonista" by Belén Aguilera. Angelita La Perversa wins the lip-sync and Kelly Passa!? is eliminated.: Guest Judge: Belén Aguilera; Mini-Challenge: Get into quick drag and do an aerobics routine; Mini-Challenge Winner: Mariana Stars; Main Challenge: Write, record, and perform verses to "Mis Amigas y Yo"; Runway Theme: La Noche de las 1000 Ana Locking (Night of 1000 Ana Lockings); Challenge Winner: La Niña Delantro; Challenge Prize: A €2,500 cash tip and a two-night hotel stay in Torremolinos; Bottom Two: Angelita La Perversa and Kelly Passa!?; Lip-Sync Song: "Antagonista" by Belén Aguilera; Eliminated: Kelly Passa!?; Farewell Message: "Jamás pensé que llegaría a escribir en este espejo. Pues mira, AQUÍ ESTOY. Pero lo que de verdad JAMÁS habría imaginado, era conocer a estas pedazo de tías tan chulas. OS AMOOOOOOO! ¡Arriba el eje del MAL! 🎭" ("I never thought I would write in this mirror. Well, HERE I AM. But what I really NEVER would have imagined, was to meet these cool chicks. I LOOOOOOOVE YOU! Up the axis of EVIL! 🎭")
36	5	"Snatch Game - España Season 4" "Snatch Game"	October 20, 2024
For this week's mini-challenge, the queens read each other to filth. Le Cocó wins the mini-challenge. For the main challenge, the queens play the Snatch Game. Lala Chus and Ger Sanc star as the celebrity contestants. The cast consisted of: Angelita La Perversa as Glòria Serra; Chloe Vittu as Amaia Romero; La Niña Delantro as El Neng de Castefa; Le Cocó as Ana Locking; Miss Khristo as Ylenia Padilla; Mariana Stars as Ana María Polo; Megui Yeillow as Yurena; Vampirashian as Mario Vaquerizo; On the runway, category is Rural Fashion Week. Le Cocó, Mariana Stars and Vampirashian receive positive critiques, with Mariana Stars winning the challenge. Angelita La Perversa, La Niña Delantro and Miss Khristo, receive negative critique, with La Niña Delantro being safe. Angelita La Perversa and Miss Khristo lip-sync to "El amor" by Massiel. Angelita La Perversa wins the lip-sync and Miss Khristo is eliminated.: Guest Judge: Valeria Vegas; Mini-Challenge: Reading is Fundamental; Mini-Challenge Winner: Le Cocó; Main Challenge: Snatch Game; Runway Theme: Rural Fashion Week; Challenge Winner: Mariana Stars; Challenge Prize: A €2,500 cash tip and a skincare set from FOREO; Bottom Two: Angelita La Perversa and Miss Kristo; Lip-Sync Song: "El amor" by Massiel; Eliminated: Miss Khristo; Farewell Message: "💋 Nunca imaginé estar dondo estoy pero nunca imaginé que esto sería el principio de algo muy GRANDE. Próxima parada, VOGUE. Os amo a todas." ("💋 I never imagined being where I am but I never imagined that this would be the beginning of something very BIG. Next stop, VOGUE. I love you all.")
37	6	"Legendary Queens, The Musical" "Eternas, el musical"	October 27, 2024
For the main challenge, the queens perform in Eternas, el musical (Eternals Queens, The Musical), a musical homage to Spanish traditional and folkloristic female singers. The cast consisted of: Angelita La Perversa as Carmen Sevilla; Chloe Vittu as Rosalía; La Niña Delantro as María del Monte; Le Cocó as Rocío Jurado; Mariana Stars as The protagonist; Megui Yeillow as Lola Flores; Vampirashian as Sara Montiel; On the runway, category is Soy Una Feria (Carnival Realness). Angelita La Perversa, Megui Yeillow and Vampirashian receive positive critiques, with Vampirashian winning the challenge. Chloe Vittu, La Niña Delantro, and Mariana Stars receive negative critiques, with Mariana Stars being safe. Chloe Vittu and La Niña Delantro lip-sync to "Mujer Loba" by Melody. Both queens are declared safe, and no one is eliminated.: Guest Judge: Melody; Main Challenge: Star and perform in Eternas, el musical (Eternals Queens, The Musical); Runway Theme: Soy Una Feria (Carnival Realness); Challenge Winner: Vampirashian; Challenge Prize: A €2,500 cash tip and a necklace and earrings from Aster LAB; Bottom Two: Chloe Vittu and La Niña Delantro; Lip-Sync Song: "Mujer Loba" by Melody; Eliminated: None
38	7	"La Draguería Del Coleccionista"	November 3, 2024
For this week's mini-challenge, the queens have a bitchfest with puppets. La Niña Delantro wins the mini-challenge. For the main challenge, the queens pair up and star in three different ads promoting household products.: Angelita La Perversa, Chloe Vittu and La Niña Delantro - SatisFryer; Le Cocó and Megui Yeillow - Butaca Bucaca (Relief Recliner); Mariana Stars and Vampirashian - Colchón LoMónica (Diva Mattress); On the runway, category is Los Cuatro Elementos (The Four Elements). Le Cocó and Megui Yeillow, receive positive critiques, with Le Cocó winning the challenge. Angelita La Perversa, La Niña Delantro and Vampirashian receive negative critiques, with La Niña Delantro being safe; However, before the lip-sync begins, Vampirashian announces that she possesses Supremme's Reina de la Suerte, which allows her to avoid elimination by swapping places with La Niña Delantro. Angelita La Perversa and La Niña Delantro lip-sync to "Puedes contar conmigo" by María Escarmiento. La Niña Delantro wins the lip-sync and Angelita La Perversa is eliminated.: Guest Judge: Eduardo Navarrete; Mini-Challenge: Everybody Loves Puppets; Mini-Challenge Winner: La Niña Delantro; Main Challenge: In pairs, star in three different ads promoting household products; Runway Theme: Los Cuatro Elementos (The Four Elements); Challenge Winner: Le Cocó; Challenge Prize: A €2,500 cash tip and a sex toys set from LELO; Bottom Two: Angelita La Perversa and Le Niña Delantro; Lip-Sync Song: "Puedes contar conmigo" by María Escarmiento; Eliminated: Angelita La Perversa; Farewell Message: "Gracias a todas por todo. Megui, Cocó, os adoro. ♡ Gracias x todo. MAURI NEYMAR" ("Thank you all for everything. Megui, Cocó, I love you. ♡ Thank you 4 everything. MAURI NEYMAR")
39	8	"Roast: Marichocho Awards" "¡Llega el roast!"	November 10, 2024
Guest Judge: Valeria Ros; Mini-Challenge: Dress members of the Pit Crew with the most items; Mini-Challenge Winner: Megui Yeillow; Mini-Challenge Prize: A selection of products from Addicted; Main Challenge: Perform a roast of the judges and the other queens while presenting awards for different categories at the first ever Marichocho Awards; Runway Theme: Tocada y no Hundida (Headdressed but non Headwrecked); Challenge Winner: Le Cocó; Challenge Prize: A €2,500 cash tip and a two-night hotel stay in Torremolinos; Bottom Two: Mariana Stars and Megui Yeillow; Lip-Sync Song: "Se acabó" by María Jiménez; Eliminated: Megui Yeillow; Farewell Message:
40	9	"Makeover: Drag Legends"	November 17, 2024
41	10	"The Reunion"	November 24, 2024
42	11	"Grand Finale"	December 1, 2024
Each of the four finalists perform a solo lip-sync performance. The judges and the eliminated queens vote on their favorite performances to determine which queen to eliminate and which three queens will advance to the final lip-sync. La Niña Delantro receives the fewest votes and is eliminated. Chloe Vittu, Le Cocó, and Vampirashian lip-sync to "Diva" by Mónica Naranjo. Before revealing the winner, Supremme De Luxe announces that there will be a live grande finale next week.: Chloe Vittu's Lip-Sync Song: "Vivir Así Es Morir de Amor" by Nathy Peluso; La Niña Delantro's Lip-Sync Song: "Going Under" by Evanescence; Vampirashian's Lip-Sync Song: "¿Quién Te Crees Que Eres Tú" by Rocío Jurado; Le Cocó's Lip-Sync Song: "El Lado Izquierdo de la Cama" by Natalia Jiménez
43	12	"The Final Battle"	December 15, 2024
