= Carlos Carvento =

Spanish dancer and choreographer

Carlos Carvento (b. 1995), known simply as Carvento or La Carvento, is a Spanish dancer, classical and contemporary dance choreographer, and drag artist. His artistic aesthetic and activism are based on reclaiming Andalusian popular traditions and reappropriating symbols like the copla, flamenco, or romerías for his political militancy within the LGBTIQ+ movement.

== Career ==
In 2019, he was at the center of a controversy after the social media platform Instagram censored one of his posts in which he appeared wearing a mantilla, in a video walking through the Great Mosque of Granada while asserting the right of "queers" to live Holy Week just like anyone else.

In June 2022, he served as the opening speaker of the LGBT pride of Córdoba, reading a manifesto alongside various LGBT associations of the city and performing that same day. That same year, he premiered his project Maricón de España: valuing the queer movement, which began as a final degree project in 2018 at the Madrid Higher Conservatory of Dance.

As a writer, he contributed to the book Flores para Lola: a queer and feminist look at the diva, by Carlos Barea, published in 2023 by the publisher Dos Bigotes. The work analyzes the history of the copla and transformism in Spain from a feminist and queer lens. Carvento wrote the essay Las otras Lola, focusing on the history of transformist impersonators of Lola Flores.

He is part of the Andalusian drag collective Las Niñas, founded in 2018 and which includes or has included prominent artists of the Spanish scene such as Rosario Molina, La Sussi, Belial, Pakita, and Samantha Hudson. In 2021, Las Niñas, in collaboration with the Lolailo collective, brought the aesthetics of the copla diva and Andalusian folklore to Madrid with a performance at the Museo Reina Sofía.

In 2025, Carvento appeared alongside Roberto Aragón as a guest on the podcast Sabor a Queer, hosted by David Velduque, in an episode dedicated to the copla and its history with the LGBT community.

== Personal life ==
Carlos is non-binary.
