= Drag Vintash =

Drag Vintash, stage name of Lorena Socorro Núñez, is a Spanish drag queen. She was the second woman in history to compete in the Drag Queen Gala of Las Palmas de Gran Canaria, after Drag Noa.

== Life and career ==
Lorena began to take an interest in the drag art world after watching the Drag Queen Gala of Las Palmas de Gran Canaria in 2012. She was completely fascinated by the drag shows and repeatedly watched the videos. It was in 2019 when she herself performed as a drag queen, delivering a show at a drag gala in the San Lorenzo neighborhood.

In 2022, Vintash performed for the first time in the Drag Queen Gala of Las Palmas de Gran Canaria, presenting the show "Evafutura", with designs by Kilian Betancor Falcón.

On February 8, 2024, she opened the Drag Queen Gala of Telde, being the first artist of the night and competing against well-known performers such as Drag Hefesto and Drag Shiki. The gala was broadcast regionally by Radio Televisión Canaria.
