= Vania Vainilla =

Spanish drag performer

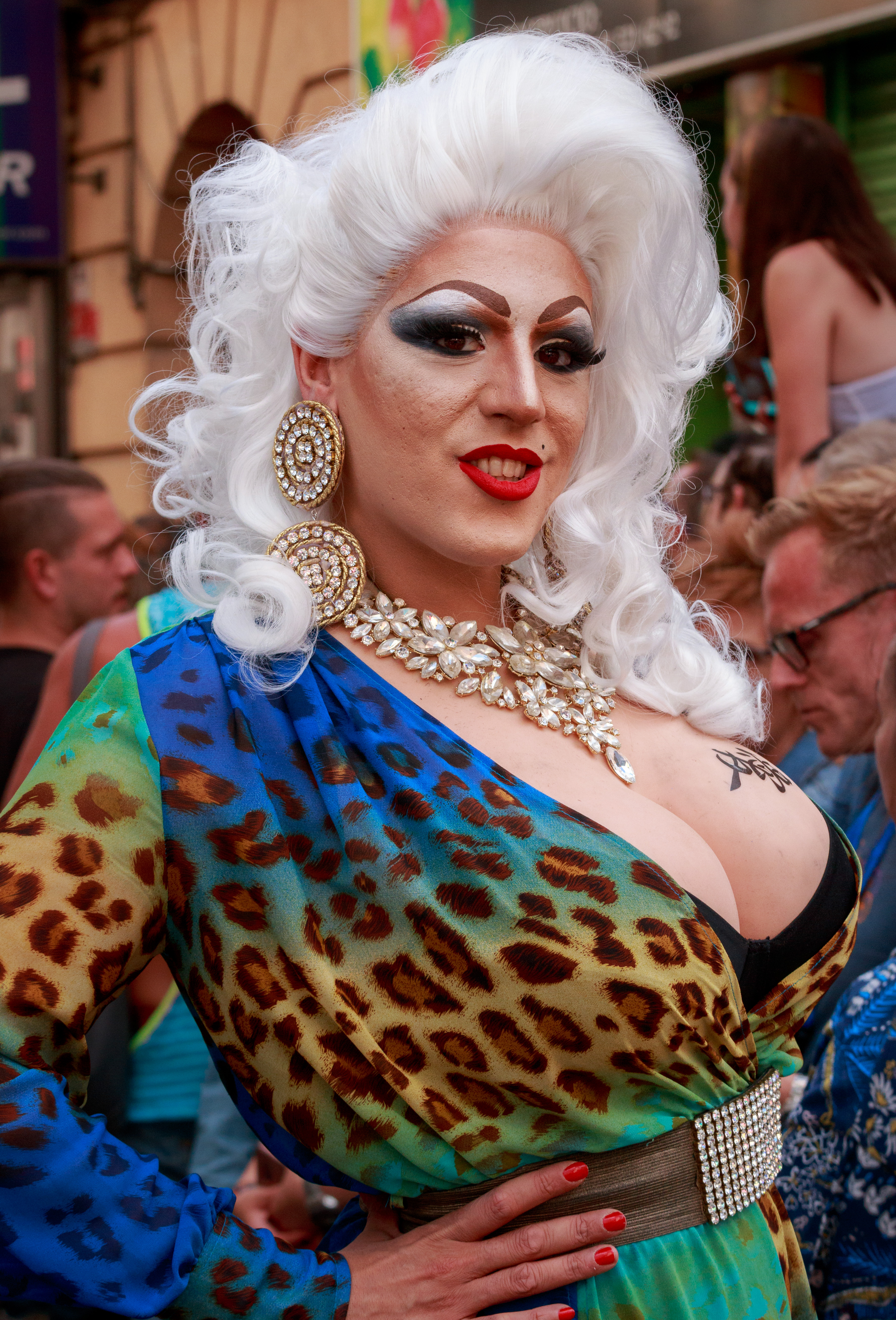
- Vania Vainilla in 2017
- Born: Diego Millán Tarrason; Zaragoza, Spain
- Occupation: Drag performer
- Television: Drag Race España (season 3)

Vania Vainilla is the stage name of Diego Millán Tarrason, a Spanish drag performer who competed on the third season of Drag Race España.

== Career ==
In 2022, Vania Vainilla participated in the Hay ganas de Orgullo de pueblo ("We Like Rural Pride") initiative by J&B, which organized LGBT Pride events and parades in Spain's major cities and rural towns.

In 2023, Vania joined the third season of the reality television show Drag Race España, which premiered on April 16, 2023. In the season's fifth episode, Snatch Game, a challenge based on celebrity impersonation, Vania chose to impersonate Bárbara Rey. Fellow contestant Hornella Góngora impersonated King Juan Carlos, and their collaboration receive the best critiques of the episode. Vania went on to become one of the season's four finalists.

== Filmography ==
=== Television ===
Year	Title	Role	Notes
2022	Socios por el mundo (Partners around the world)	Guest	1 episode
2023	Drag Race España	Herself	11 episodes

=== Podcasts ===
Year	Title	Role	Notes
2022	Canelis & Dragonas	Guest	1 episode
2023	¡Ay, la Caneli!	Guest	1 episode

== Discography ==
=== Singles ===
Year	Title
2022	"Amo La Noche - LL Bar 27 Aniversario" with Chumina Power
