= La Niña Delantro =

Spanish drag performer

- Other name: Aura Ibáñez Guerrero
- Occupation: Drag performer

La Niña Delantro is the stage name of Aura Ibáñez Guerrero, a Spanish drag performer competing on the fourth season of Drag Race España.

== Personal life ==
She is from Castellón de la Plana. Aura was born on January 5, 2001, and from an early age attended dance classes alongside her school education.

While in secondary school, she came out as non-binary. After graduating, she enrolled in a bachelor’s program focused on the arts, and in 2022 came out as a trans woman. At the beginning of her transition, she began performing and experimenting with drag art with the help of her then partner and current “drag mother,” Eco Delantro.

In 2022, she was the subject of an article in the newspaper 20 Minutos after becoming involved in a social media controversy when she publicly denounced a gym for transphobic treatment and for denying her access to the women’s changing rooms because of her identity as a trans woman. That same year, she won the first edition of the drag competition Oz, esto no es Kansas in Castellón de la Plana.

In June 2023, together with Eco Delantro, she was chosen to deliver the opening address for LGBT Pride in the municipality of Moncófar. A few days earlier, on June 17, she performed after the march for LGTBIAQ+ Pride Day in Castellón. In July 2023, she took part in Orgull de Nit, the event that closed the celebrations for LGTBIQ+ Pride Month in Valencia.

In March 2024, she performed at the Magdalena festivities alongside artists such as Sharonne, Marcus Massalami, and Kelly Roller. On June 15, she delivered the artistic opening address for LGBT Pride Day in Castellón. On September 8, she was officially announced as one of the 12 contestants of the fourth season of the reality television program Drag Race España, the Spanish version of RuPaul’s Drag Race. On September 14 of the same year, she performed at an official event for LGBT Pride in Castellón.
