= Eva Soriano =

Spanish comedian (born 1990)

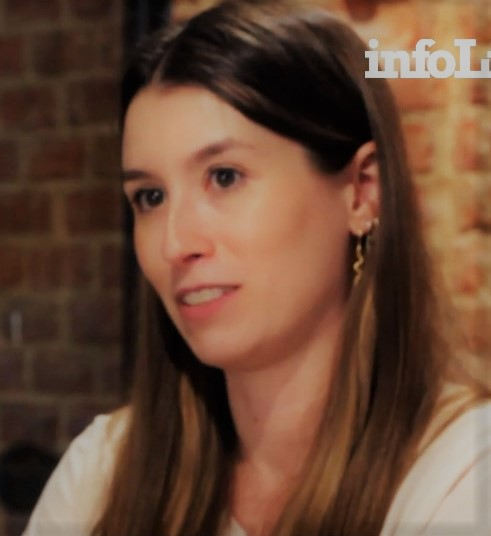
- Eva Soriano in 2021
- Born: 4 March 1990 (age 36); Reus, Tarragona, Spain
- Occupations: Comedian, presenter and singer
- Years active: 2014–present

Eva Soriano Sánchez (Reus, March 4, 1990) is a Spanish comedian and presenter.

== Trajectory ==
She graduated in Tourism and Leisure from Rovira i Virgili University, where she concluded her studies in 2013. Interested in acting, she trained in acting at the Metropolis c. e. film and theater school in Madrid. During this stage, she participated, as part of her training, in theatrical and musical performances and collaborated in several short films made by the school. She also did micro-theater. She continued performing monologues. In 2017, she participated in El Club de la Comedia. In 2018, she participated in La resistencia, attended as a guest on Ilustres ignorantes, and was a collaborator in Yu, no te pierdas nada. She worked in Late motiv on #0 as a collaborator in the section "Gente random" in 2018. She was co-host of Ese programa del que usted me habla on La 2 rom January 2019 to January 2020, replacing Marta Flich, who was previously a collaborator. She intervened as a collaborator in the program Hoy no se sale on Ubeat, which premiered in February 2019. She was part of the humor program Las que faltaban on #0, which premiered in March 2019, a late night in which female comedians were the featured protagonists. In 2022, she began presenting the program La Noche D on RTVE.

In Puerto Rico, she drew a lot of attention when in Late motiv she imitated Bad Bunny and her particular way of singing. The producer EFKTO turned it into a song, going viral on the social network TikTok. In August 2021, it was announced that Eva and the comedian Iggy Rubn would be in charge of the new morning show on Europa FM.

== Filmography ==
Theatrical performances
Year	Title	Role	Directed by
2014	¿Qué paza en ehta caza?	Catalina	
2014	Don't leave me (Musical)		Eva Soriano

Short films
Year	Title	Role	Directed by
2014	Game Over	Eva	Idoya Urech
2014	Reflejos		
2014	La culpa es de Kevin	Jefa de animadoras	Nacho Serapio
2014	Sombras		

== Theater plays ==
Year	Title	Role	Directed by	Theater	Notes
2018	El pecado de Eva (Comedia en vivo)	Eva	Eva Soriano	Cine Palacio de la Prensa	Own show
	El sopar dels idiotes				
	L'Amor a totes les edats				
	Dolça primavera (Musical)				

=== MicroteaMicro Theatertro ===
Year	Title	Role	Directed by	Sala
2014	La noche del cardo		Manuel Galea	Sala El Apartamento
2014	Crónica de una cagada anunciada	Mari Luz	Eva Soriano	
2014	Ya son las tres (Musical)			

== Television and radio ==
Television
Year	Program	Channel	Role
2017	El club de la comedia	laSexta	Monologist
2018	Ese programa del que usted me habla	La 2	Collaborator
2018	La resistencia	#0	Monologist
2018	Ilustres ignorantes	#0	Guest
2018–2021	Late motiv	#0	Collaborator / Substitute presenter
2019	Ese programa del que usted me habla	La 2	Co-Presenter
2019	Las que faltaban	#0	Collaborator
2019	Zapeando	laSexta	Collaborator
2019	Se acabó lo que se daba	Telemadrid	Guest
2019	Ritmo urbano	La 2	Opening
2019	Roast Battle	Comedy Central	Contestant vs. Miguel Iríbar
2020	Tu cara me suena 8	Antena 3	Guest as Olivia Newton-John
2021	Roast Battle	Comedy Central	Contestant vs. Ana Morgade
2021–2022	Tu cara me suena 9	Antena 3	Contestant; 4th finalist
2022	La noche D	La 1	Presenter
2022	Feliz Año Neox	Neox	Presenter, with Miki Nadal
2023	Drag Race España	ATRESplayer Premium	Guest judge; Episode: "The Second Chance"
2023	Tu cara me suena 10	Antena 3	Guest as Aitana
2023	Takeshi's Castle	Amazon Prime Video	Voice
2024	Atrapats amb Eva Soriano	TV3	Presenter
2024	Tu cara me suena 11	Antena 3	Guest as Cher
2024	¿Quién quiere ser millonario?	LaSexta	Celebrity contestant
2026	El desafío	Antena 3	Contestant

Radio
Year	Program	Channel	Role
2018	La lengua moderna	Cadena Ser	Guest (1 program)
2018	Yu, No te pierdas nada	Europa FM	Collaborator
2021–present	Cuerpos Especiales	Europa FM	Voiceover

Other platforms
Year	Program	Channel	Role
2019	Frikimalismo fm	Podcast / YouTube	Guest (1 program)
2019	Hoy no se sale	Ubeat	Collaborator (7 programs)
2019	El sentido de la birra	YouTube	Guest (1 program)
2019	Movidas minúsculas	YouTube	Guest (1 program)
2019	Frikimalismo fm	Podcast / YouTube	Collaborator (4th season)
2020	Esto NO es una serie	Vodafone TV	Collaborator (6 programs)
2021	Colgados del aro	Servicio OTT / YouTube	Guest (1 program)
