= Visa (drag queen) =

Mexican drag performer

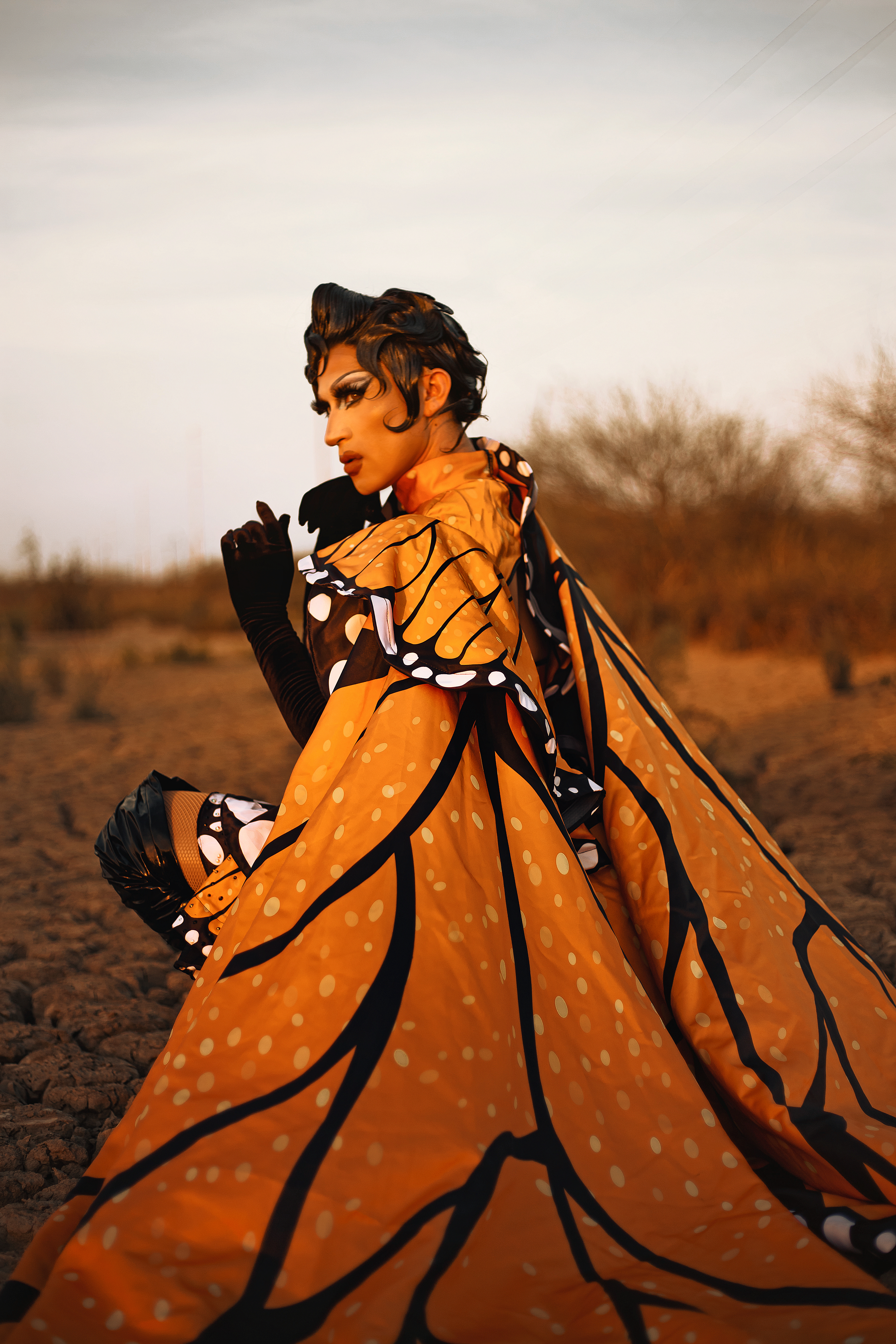
- Visa in 2023
- Born: Edi David Roque García; Tampico, Mexico
- Occupation: Drag queen
- Television: Drag Race España (season 3)

Visa is the stage name of Edi David Roque García, a Mexican drag queen known for competing on the first season of Toma mi dinerita and on the third season of Drag Race España.

== Career ==
Visa began her drag career performing in various carnivals in Tampico, Madero, and Altamira, often winning prizes for best individual costume.

In 2020, Visa was one of the contestants in the first season of the Mexican drag competition, Toma mi dinerita.

In 2023, Visa joined the third season of reality television competition, Drag Race España, which premiered on April 16. She became the first Mexican drag queen to compete in Spain. In the sixth episode, Visa was up for elimination, which lead to her competing in a lip sync battle against fellow contestant Clover Bish to the song "Dime" by Beth. Ultimately, Clover was declared the winner, and Visa became the season's sixth eliminated queen. As a result of this decision, the judges, especially Javier Calvo and Javier Ambrossi, were widely criticized by viewers.

== Filmography ==
=== Television ===
Year	Title	Role	Notes
2020	Toma Mi Dinerita	Herself	1 episode
2023	Drag Race España	Herself	7 episodes
2023	Tras la carrera	Herself	1 episode

- Bring Back My Girls (2024)
