= Pitita =

Spanish drag performer

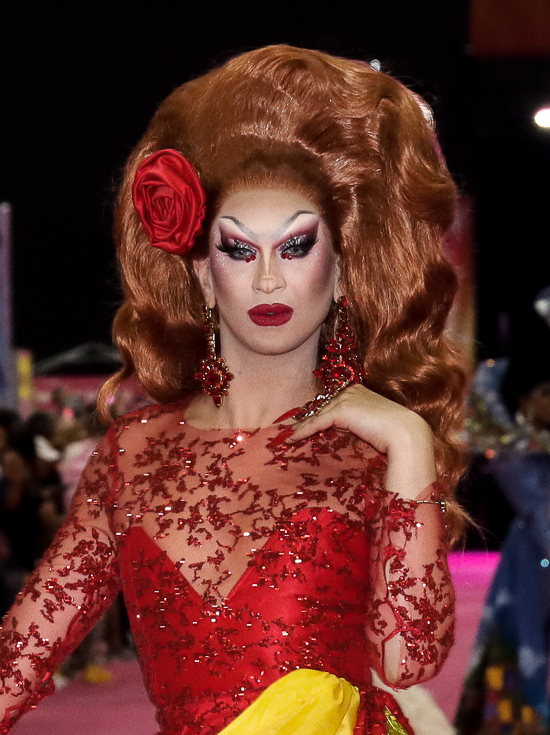
- Pitita at RuPaul's DragCon LA, 2024
- Born: Bernat Bordes Vendrell; February 16, 1995 (age 31); Barcelona, Spain
- Other names: Pitita Queen
- Occupation: Drag performer
- Television: Drag Race España (season 3)

Pitita, sometimes referred to as Pitita Queen, is the stage name of Bernat Bordes Vendrell (born February 16, 1995), a Spanish drag performer from Barcelona, known for winning the third season of Drag Race España.

== Career ==
In 2023, Pitita joined the third season of the reality television show Drag Race España, which premiered on April 16, 2023. Gay Times called her the season's "fashion queen". In the season's fifth episode, titled "Snatch Game," in which the main challenge consisted of celebrity impersonation, Pitita chose to play Sara Montiel, however this was not well received by the show's judges. In the seventh episode, Pitita was nominated, along with Pakita and Pink Chadora for a double elimination. The three queens competed in a lip sync battle to the song "No controles" by Olé Olé to stay on the show. Pitita was ultimately declared the winner with Pakita and Pink Chadora eliminated from the season. In the eighth episode, Pitita was declared the winner of the main challenge, "Un, dos, drag," ("One, two, drag," a reference to the long-running Spanish game show Un, dos, tres... responda otra vez) for her fourth win of the season. After the ninth episode, which saw the elimination of Clover Bish, Pitita became one of the season's four finalists.

During her time on Drag Race España, Pitita was the recipient of mixed opinions and strong criticism from social media, where she was accused of being favored by production and having secured the crown from the beginning. Critics claimed the show's judges lacked impartiality, especially after the eighth episode, in which Pitita and Clover Bish competed as a pair, and, despite it being stated at the beginning of the episode that the best pair would win the challenge, only Pitita was named the winner after the judges criticized Clover Bish's runway look for being more "costume" than couture.

== Filmography ==
=== Television ===
- Drag Race España (season 3, 2023)
- Bring Back My Girls (2024)

== Discography ==
=== Singles ===
| Year | Title |
|---|---|
| 2023 | "Pedigrí" |
