= Drag Noa =

Spanish drag queen

- Occupation: Drag queen

Drag Noa, the name of the artist Norma Ruiz, is a Spanish drag queen. in 2008, she became the first woman to compete in the Las Palmas de Gran Canaria Drag Queen Gala.

== Career ==
Norma competed for the first time as a drag queen in 2008 in the Las Palmas de Gran Canaria Drag Queen Gala, the first woman to do so, calling attention in the national press. That year, despite the misogynist reaction of some of the show's fans and some media outlets, Noa was a finalist in the show.

In 2014, Noa became the second finalist in the Las Palmas de Gran Canaria Drag Queen Gala competition, taking third place, with her show "Hollyboop, mon amour."

In 2018, she was a winner in the Gala Drag del Carnaval Encantado Arrecife with the show "¡¡¡Arriba Mari … neros!!!" with designs by Manuel Encinoso and Begoña Pérez.

In 2019, she was the finalist in the Gala Drag de la Palma, losing to Drag Chuchi.

On June 25, 2023, Drag Noa performed with Vanessa Artiles and Drag Eiko, at the Feria del Libro de la Palma de Gran Canaria.
