= Le Cocó =

Spanish drag performer

Le Cocó is the stage name of Álvaro Muñoz de Gracia, a Spanish drag performer who won the fourth season of Drag Race España.

== Career ==
Le Cocó competed on the fourth season of Drag Race España at the age of 28.

== Personal life ==
Le Cocó is based in Madrid.

== Filmography ==
- Drag Race España (season 4; 2024)

== See also ==
- List of people from Madrid
