= Satín Greco =

Spanish drag performer

Satín Greco is the stage name of Carlos Julián Villanueva Díaz, a Spanish drag performer who won the fifth season of Drag Race España.

== Career ==
Satín Greco competed on the fifth season of Drag Race España.

== Personal life ==
Satín Greco is from Torremolinos.

Her drag name comes from the Moulin Rouge! character and the name of her "aunt" who is also a drag performer.
