= Valeria Ros =

Spanish presenter and comedian

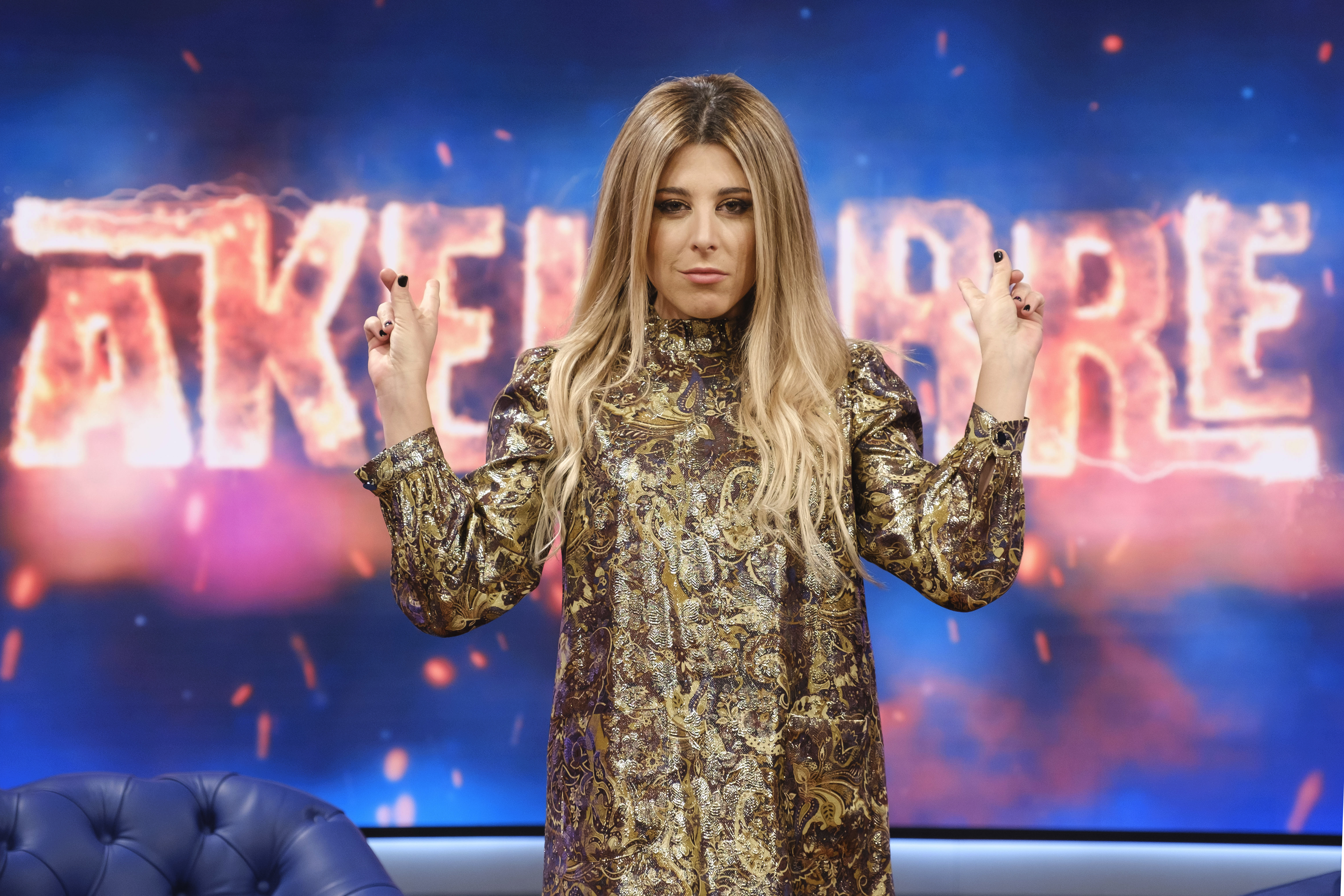
- Born: Valeria López-Tapia Velasco; October 5, 1986 (age 40); Guecho, Spain
- Occupations: Screenwriter, announcer, presenter, comedian

Valeria López-Tapia Velasco (born 5 October 1986), better known as Valeria Ros, is a Spanish screenwriter, announcer, actress, presenter and comedian.

== Career ==
She started in comedy as a stand-up comedian in the program Central de cómicos in Comedy Central. She is also a contributor and announcer for Cadena SER.

In July 2019 she started collaborating in Zapeando.
