= Bestiah =

Spanish drag queen and singer

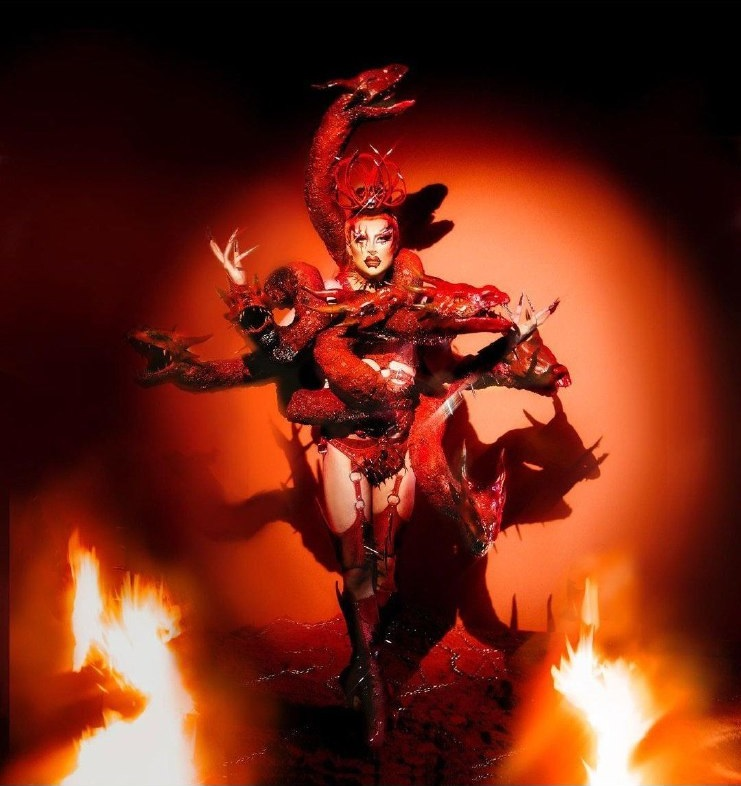
- Bestiah in 2023
- Born: Marcos Galisteo Pedraz; April 11, 1992 (age 33); Leganés, Spain
- Other names: Ivory Mess
- Occupation: Drag queen
- Television: Drag Race España (season 3)
- Website: bestiah.com

Bestiah, formerly known as Ivory Mess, is the stage name of Marcos Galisteo Pedraz (born April 11, 1992), a Spanish drag queen and singer known for competing on the third season of Drag Race España.

== Career ==
In 2021, still under the stage name Ivory Mess, Bestiah was interviewed for the web series Eso no se pregunta (We don't ask about that), as part of the episode, Eso no se pregunta: Drag Queen.

In 2023, Bestiah joined the cast of the third season of the reality television competition Drag Race España, which premiered on April 16, 2023. In the season's eighth episode, Bestiah was up for elimination, which lead to her facing off against Kelly Roller in a lip sync battle to the song "La Niña" by María Peláe. The judges ultimately declared Kelly Roller the winner and Bestiah became the ninth queen to be eliminated from the season. After her elimination, she stated that she felt that alternative drag is not appreciated as much as other types of drag seen on Drag Race, which offers fewer opportunities to alternative drag queens.

After her run on the show, Bestiah released the music video for "Suelta la bestia" ("Release the beast"), inspired by concepts like the Biblical apocalypse and punk aesthetics, in which she collaborated with national drag artists like Marcus Massalami, Kimera, Saga, Anestesia, and the winner of Mr. Puppy Spain 2022, Pup Kirk.

Bestiah is also part of the national tour Gran Hotel de las Reinas, which begins September 14, 2022, in which she is performing alongside fellow season three queens.

== Filmography ==
=== Television ===
Year	Title	Role	Notes
2021	Eso no se pregunda	Ivory Mess	1 episode
2022	Meet the Queens	Bestiah	1 episode
2022	Drag Race España	Bestiah	10 episodes
2022	Tras la carrera	Bestiah	1 episode

- Bring Back My Girls

== Discography ==
=== Singles ===
Year	Title
2023	"Suelta a la bestia"
2023	"Niño a la Deriva"
