= Manuela Trasobares =

Spanish artist, operatic mezzo-soprano and politician

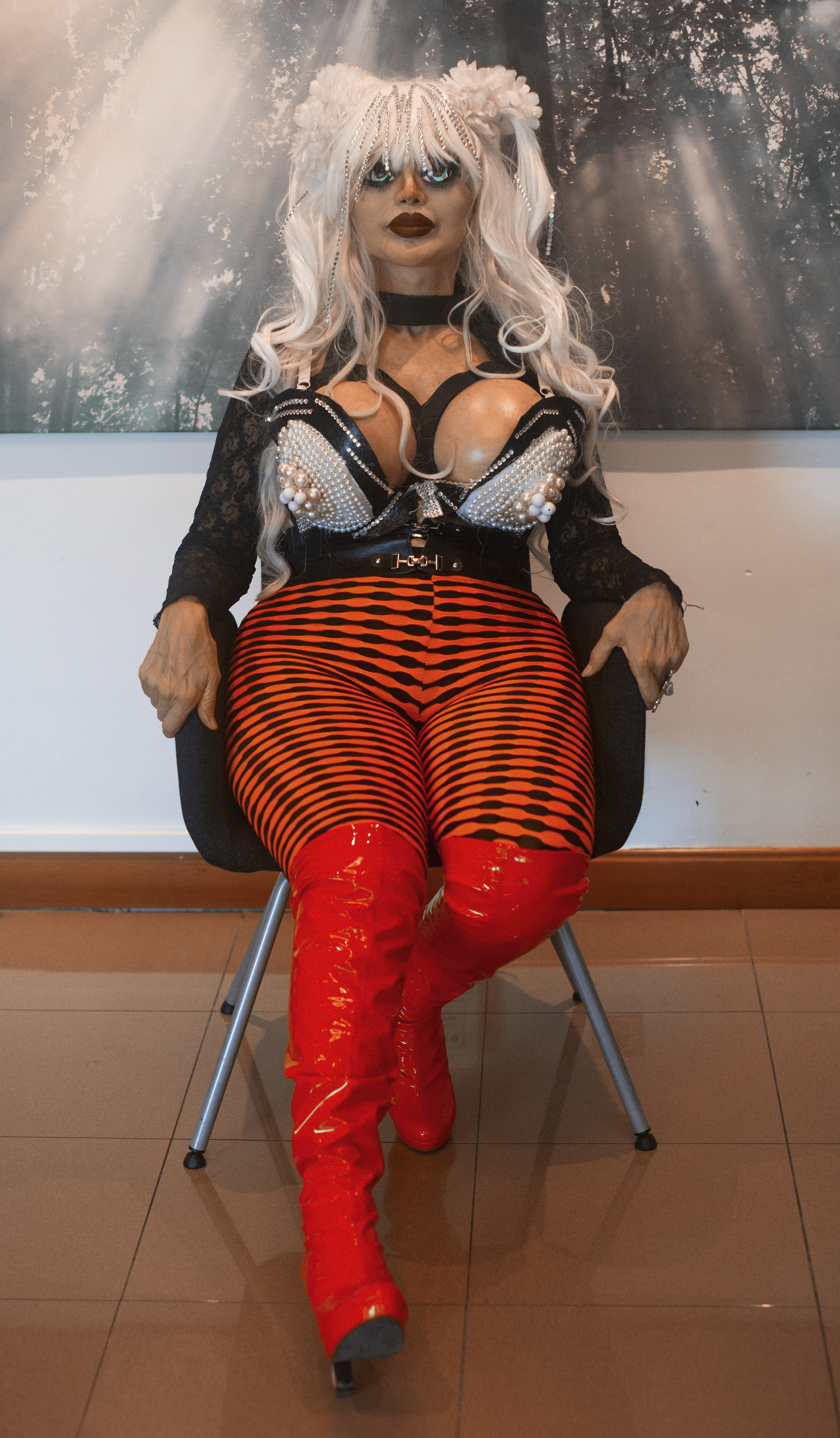
- Trasobares in 2023
- Born: 28 September 1954 (age 71); Figueres
- Known for: Painting, Politician
- Website: http://www.trasobaresart.com/

Manuela Trasobares Haro (born 28 September 1954) is a Spanish artist, operatic mezzo-soprano, and politician.

Trasobares was born in Figueres in the province of Girona, Catalonia, Spain. She studied fine arts at the Facultat de Belles Arts de Sant Jordi of university of Barcelona, painting and sculpture in the ateliers Massana and Leonardo da Vinci in Barcelona and bel canto in the Conservatory of Sofia. She has performed in operas at the Liceu in Barcelona, La Scala, and the Palau de la Música de València.

She has also directed opera shows and her works as a sculptor and as a painter have a clear surrealist influence.

As a politician and trans woman, she is the first Spanish transgender town councilor in Geldo with the political party Acción Republicana Democrática Española (Spanish Democratic Republican Action).
