= Drag Race España season 3 =

Third season of 'Drag Race España'

Drag Race España
- Season 3
- Promotional poster for season three
- Hosted by: Supremme de Luxe
- Judges: Supremme de Luxe; Ana Locking; Javier Ambrossi; Javier Calvo
- No. of contestants: 13
- Winner: Pitita
- Runner-up: Vania Vainilla
- Miss Congeniality: María Edilia
- No. of episodes: 11

Release
- Original network: ATRESplayer Premium (Spain); WOW Presents Plus (International)
- Original release: 16 April – 25 June 2023

Season chronology
- ← Previous; Season 2 Next → Season 4

The third season of Drag Race España premiered on 16 April 2023. The season airs on ATRESplayer Premium in Spain and WOW Presents Plus internationally. The season was confirmed by Atresmedia on 20 September 2022, along with an All Stars version of the franchise.

The winner of the season was Pitita, with Vania Vainilla as runner-up.

== Production ==
=== Promotion ===
The production company, World of Wonder, released a 15-second teaser on social media. The clip showcases the host, Supremme de Luxe, traveling throughout the galaxy with the season three contestants (without showing their faces).

Twelve contestants were announced on 19 March 2023. Participants include The Switch Drag Race alumna Pakita as well as Clover Bish, the Drag Race franchise's second cisgender female contestant, following Victoria Scone from the British adaptation.

The third season of Drag Race España is the first in the franchise to introduce a previously eliminated contestant in to the series: The Macarena, featured on the first season, was introduced as a surprise thirteenth contestant in the season premiere.

== Contestants ==
Ages, names, and cities stated are at time of filming.

Contestants of Drag Race España season 3 and their backgrounds
Contestant	Age	Hometown	Outcome
Pitita	27	Barcelona, Catalonia	Winner
Vania Vainilla	39	Zaragoza, Aragon	Runner-up
Hornella Góngora (Note: Hornella Maria Góngora Ciccone is referred to as Hornella Góngora on the show.)	35	Alicante, Valencian Community	3rd place (Note: Kelly Roller originally placed tenth before re-entering the competition.)
Kelly Roller	30	Torremolinos, Andalusia	3rd place
Clover Bish	24	Barcelona, Catalonia	5th place
Bestiah	30	Leganés, Community of Madrid	6th place
Pakita (Note: Now known as Pakita, she was referred to as Franciska Tólika on The Switch Drag Race season 2, where she placed fifteenth.)	28	Seville, Andalusia	7th place
Pink Chadora	38	Málaga, Andalusia	7th place
Visa	34	Tampico, Mexico	9th place
The Macarena (Note: The Macarena originally competed on season 1, placing tenth.)	31	Cádiz, Andalusia	10th place
Chanel Anorex	31	Salamanca, Castile and León	11th place
Drag Chuchi	32	Las Palmas, Canary Islands	12th place
María Edilia	41	Maracay, Venezuela	13th place (Note: Maria Edilia was voted Miss Congeniality by fellow contestants.)

== Contestants progress ==
Legend:

Pitita won Drag Race España season 3.
Vania Vainilla was the runner-up.
Maria Edilia was voted Miss Congeniality (Miss C) by fellow contestants.
Visa won Miss Lost Look (MLL) for having the best unaired look of the season.
WIN indicates that the contestant won the challenge.
IN indicates that the contestant won the challenge and earned re-entry into the competition.
SAFE indicates that the contestant was declared safe by the judges.
BTM (Bottom) indicates that the contestant was up for elimination.
ELIM (Eliminated) indicates that the contestant was eliminated.
LOSS indicates that the contestant returned to win re-entry into the competition, but lost.
Guest indicates that the contestant returned as a guest.

Contestants progress with placements in each episode
Contestant	Episode										
Contestant	1	2	3	4	5	6	7	8	9	10	11
Pitita	SAFE	SAFE	WIN	WIN	SAFE	WIN	BTM	WIN	SAFE	Guest	Winner
Vania Vainilla	SAFE	BTM	SAFE	SAFE	SAFE	SAFE	WIN	SAFE	WIN	Guest	Runner-up
Hornella Góngora	SAFE	SAFE	SAFE	SAFE	SAFE	SAFE	SAFE	SAFE	BTM	Guest	Eliminated
Kelly Roller	SAFE	SAFE	BTM	ELIM			IN	BTM	SAFE	Guest	Eliminated
Clover Bish	SAFE	SAFE	SAFE	BTM	SAFE	BTM	SAFE	SAFE	ELIM	Guest	Guest
Bestiah	WIN	SAFE	SAFE	SAFE	SAFE	SAFE	SAFE	ELIM		Guest	Guest
Pakita	SAFE	SAFE	SAFE	SAFE	BTM	SAFE	ELIM			Guest	Guest
Pink Chadora	SAFE	WIN	SAFE	SAFE	WIN	SAFE	ELIM			Guest	Guest
Visa	SAFE	SAFE	SAFE	SAFE	SAFE	ELIM	LOSS			MLL	Guest
The Macarena	SAFE	SAFE	SAFE	SAFE	ELIM		LOSS			Guest	Guest
Chanel Anorex	SAFE	SAFE	ELIM				LOSS			Guest	Guest
Drag Chuchi	BTM	ELIM					LOSS			Guest	Guest
Maria Edilia	ELIM						LOSS			Miss C	Guest

== Lip syncs ==
Legend:

The contestant was eliminated after their first time in the bottom.
The contestant was eliminated after their second time in the bottom.
The contestant was eliminated after their third time in the bottom.
The contestant won the Lip Sync for the Crown and was declared the winner of the season.

Episode	Contestants			Song	Eliminated
1	Drag Chuchi	vs.	Maria Edilia	"Despechá" (Rosalía)	Maria Edilia
2	Drag Chuchi	vs.	Vania Vainilla	"La noche es para mí" (Soraya)	Drag Chuchi
3	Chanel Anorex	vs.	Kelly Roller	"Genio atrapado" (Christina Aguilera)	Chanel Anorex
4	Clover Bish	vs.	Kelly Roller	"Ay mamá" (Rigoberta Bandini)	Kelly Roller
5	Pakita	vs.	The Macarena	"Desátame" (Mónica Naranjo)	The Macarena
6	Clover Bish	vs.	Visa	"Dime" (Beth)	Visa
7	Pakita vs. Pink Chadora vs. Pitita			"No controles" (Olé Olé)	Pakita
7	Pakita vs. Pink Chadora vs. Pitita			"No controles" (Olé Olé)	Pink Chadora
8	Bestiah	vs.	Kelly Roller	"La niña" (María Peláe)	Bestiah
9	Clover Bish	vs.	Hornella Góngora	"Vas a volverme loca" (Natalia)	Clover Bish
Episode	Final contestants			Song	Winner
11	Pitita	vs.	Vania Vainilla	"Punto de partida" (Rocío Jurado)	Pitita

== Guest judges ==
Listed in chronological order:

- Paco León, actor and director
- Soraya Arnelas, singer and Eurovision 2009 Spanish representative
- Palomo Spain, fashion designer
- Paco Plaza, filmmaker
- La Terremoto de Alcorcón, singer and vedette
- Mónica Cruz, actress and dancer
- Eva Soriano, comedian and television presenter
- María Peláe, singer and songwriter
- Valentina, RuPaul's Drag Race Season 9 and All Stars 4 contestant and host of Drag Race México

=== Special guests ===
Guests who appeared in episodes, but did not judge on the main stage.

Episode 1

- Mista, photographer

Episode 2

- Chanel, singer, actress and Eurovision 2022 Spanish representative
- Carmelo Segura, choreographer

Episode 5

- Karina, singer
- Pupi Poisson, contestant and Miss Congeniality on the first season of Drag Race España

Episode 6

- Carlos Marco, singer and music producer
- Carmelo Segura, choreographer
- Ferrán González, author

Episode 8

- Álvaro Kruse, ambassador of Krash Kosmetics
- Fernanda and Teresa Hurtado, comedians

Episode 10

- Alejandro Amenábar, film director, screenwriter and composer
- Ariel Rec, contestant on the second season of Drag Race España
- Diamante Merybrown, contestant on the second season of Drag Race España
- Drag Sethlas, contestant on the second season of Drag Race España
- Estrella Xtravaganza, runner-up on the second season of Drag Race España
- Jota Carajota, contestant on the second season of Drag Race España
- Juriji der Klee, contestant on the second season of Drag Race España
- Marina, contestant on the second season of Drag Race España
- Marisa Prisa, contestant on the second season of Drag Race España
- Onyx, contestant on the second season of Drag Race España
- Samantha Ballentines, contestant and Miss Congeniality on the second season of Drag Race España
- Sharonne, winner on the second season of Drag Race España
- Venedita Von Däsh, runner-up on the second season of Drag Race España

Episode 11

- Carmelo Segura, choreographer
- Sharonne, winner on the second season of Drag Race España

== Episodes ==
No. overall	No. in season	Title	Original release date
21	1	"Spain is Different" "Supremme Eleganza Talent Extravaganza"	April 16, 2023
Twelve new queens enter the workroom. The Macarena, who was first eliminated on Season 1, made a comeback to compete again. For the first mini-challenge, the queens do a photoshoot posing as different farm animals. Hornella Góngora wins the mini-challenge. For the main challenge, the queens perform in the Supremme Eleganza Talent Extravaganza.: Bestiah - Live singing and lip-syncing; Chanel Anorex - Lip-syncing; Clover Bish - Lip-syncing; Drag Chuchi - Lip-syncing; Hornella Góngora - Live singing; Kelly Roller - Roller skating and lip-syncing; Maria Edilia - Variety; Pakita - Pole dancing and live singing; Pink Chadora - Lip-syncing; Pitita - Mime routine; The Macarena - Live singing; Vania Vainilla - Comedy routine; Visa - Aerial gymnastics and lip-syncing; On the runway, category is Spain is Different. Bestiah, Hornella Góngora and Pakita receive positive critiques, with Bestiah winning the challenge. Drag Chuchi, Kelly Roller, Mariah Edilia and The Macarena receive negative critiques, with Kelly Roller and The Macarena being safe. Drag Chuchi and Maria Edilia lip-sync to "Despechá" by Rosalía. Drag Chuchi wins the lip-sync and Maria Edilia is the first queen to sashay away.: Guest Judge: Paco León; Mini-Challenge: Photoshoot posing as different farm animals; Mini-Challenge Winner: Hornella Góngora; Mini-Challenge Prize: A photoshoot for Shangay Magazine; Main Challenge: Perform in the Supremme Eleganza Talent Extravaganza; Runway Theme: Spain is Different; Challenge Winner: Bestiah; Challenge Prize: A €2,500 cash tip; Bottom Two: Drag Chuchi and Maria Edilia; Lip-Sync Song: "Despechá" by Rosalía; Eliminated: Maria Edilia; Farewell Message: "Luchen Siempre X Sus Sueños. XOXO Maria Edilia" ("Always Fight For Your Dreams. XOXO Maria Edilia")
22	2	"Drag Vision" "Dragvisión"	April 23, 2023
For this week's mini-challenge, the queens take a Eurovision Song Contest quiz, in which the queens must match a previous winner of the Eurovision Song Contest with the country they represented. The Macarena wins the mini-challenge. For the main challenge, the queens perform a choreographed dance number to Chanel's song "SloMo".: Team Glitterazo (The Glitterats) - Bestiah, Chanel Anorex, Clover Bish, Pink Chadora, The Macarena and Visa; Team Las Muerta Hari (The Deadly Haris) - Drag Chuchi, Hornella Góngora, Kelly Roller, Pakita, Pitita and Vania Vainilla; On the runway, category is España en Eurovisión (Spain in Eurovision). Team Glitterazo (The Glitterats) is the winning team, with Pink Chadora winning the challenge. Team Las Muerta Hari (The Deadly Haris) is the losing team. Drag Chuchi, Pakita and Vania Vainilla receive negative critiques, with Pakita being safe. Drag Chuchi and Vania Vainilla lip-sync to "La noche es para mí" by Soraya. Vania Vainilla wins the lip-sync and Drag Chuchi sashays away.: Guest Judge: Soraya; Mini-Challenge: Eurovision Song Contest quiz; Mini-Challenge Winner: The Macarena; Mini-Challenge Prize: A €2,500 cash tip from Addicted; Main Challenge: Perform a choreographed dance number to Chanel's song "SloMo"; Runway Theme: España en Eurovisión (Spain in Eurovision); Challenge Winner: Pink Chadora; Challenge Prize: A €2,500 cash tip and 2 nights at the Barcelona Axel Hotel; Bottom Two: Drag Chuchi and Vania Vainilla; Lip-Sync Song: "La noche es para mí" by Soraya; Eliminated: Drag Chuchi; Farewell Message: "No se olviden de ser únicas. Les espero en el paraiso. Chuchi" ("Don't forget to be unique. I'll wait for you in paradise. Chuchi")
23	3	"The Great Ball of Regions" "El gran ball de las regiones"	April 30, 2023
For this week's main challenge, the queens create three looks for The Great Ball of Regions: Calores (Colors), Sabores (Flavors) and Regiones (Regions). On the runway, Bestiah, Pakita and Pitita receive positive critiques, with Pitita winning the challenge. Chanel Anorex, Clover Bish and Kelly Roller receive negative critiques, with Clover Bish being safe. Chanel Anorex and Kelly Roller lip-sync to "Genio Atrapado" by Christina Aguilera. Kelly Roller wins the lip-sync and Chanel Anorex sashays away.: Guest Judge: Palomo Spain; Main Challenge: The Great Ball of Regions; Runway Themes: Colores (Colors), Sabores (Flavors) and Regiones (Regions); Challenge Winner: Pitita; Challenge Prize: A €2,500 cash tip and a necklace and earrings from Aster LAB; Bottom Two: Chanel Anorex and Kelly Roller; Lip-Sync Song: "Genio Atrapado" by Christina Aguilera; Eliminated: Chanel Anorex; Farewell Message: "Manteneos fieles a vosotores mismas, aunque vayas al infierno. Os quiero, desgraciadas." ("Stay true to yourselves, even if you'll go to hell. I love you wretches.")
24	4	"Drag Sequels" "Secuelas de terror drag"	May 7, 2023
For this week's main challenge, the queens team up and act in three different Spanish horror films.: Drag Rec - Bestiah, Pakita and Pitita; El Guarranato - Hornella Góngora, Kelly Roller, Pink Chadora and Vania Vainilla; Las Otras - Clover Bish, The Macarena and Visa; On the runway, category is Mi Peor Yo (My Worst Me). Pakita, Pitita and The Macarena receive positive critiques, with Pitita winning the challenge. Clover Bish, Kelly Roller and Visa receive negative critiques, with Visa being safe. Clover Bish and Kelly Roller lip-sync to "Ay mamá" by Rigoberta Bandini. Clover Bish wins the lip-sync and Kelly Roller sashays away.: Guest Judge: Paco Plaza; Main Challenge: In teams, act in three different Spanish horror films; Runway Theme: Mi Peor Yo (My Worst Me); Challenge Winner: Pitita; Challenge Prize: A €2,500 cash tip and a trip to Axel Hoteles San Sebastián; Bottom Two: Clover Bish and Kelly Roller; Lip-Sync Song: "Ay mamá" by Rigoberta Bandini; Eliminated: Kelly Roller; Farewell Message: "Gracias a todas por enseñarme tanto y por todo el amor que me llevo. No dejéis nunca de soñar! Pd. ¡Limpia, zorra!" ("Thank you all for teaching me so much and for all the love I take with me. Never stop dreaming! P.S. Clean up bitch!")
25	5	"Snatch Game - España Season 3" "Snatch Game"	May 14, 2023
For this week's mini-challenge, the queens read each other to filth. Pakita wins the mini-challenge. For the main challenge, the queens play the Snatch Game. Karina and Pupi Poisson star as the celebrity contestants. The cast consisted of: Bestiah as La Hierbas; Clover Bish as Maite Galdeano; Hornella Góngora as Juan Carlos I; Pakita as Peppa Pig (credited as Pepa Pink); Pink Chadora as Lola Flores; Pitita as Sara Montiel; The Macarena as Paca La Piraña; Vania Vainilla as Bárbara Rey; Visa as Paulina Rubio; On the runway, category is Arriba la pluma (Show Your Feathers). Hornella Góngora, Pink Chadora, Vania Vainilla and Visa receive positive critiques, with Pink Chadora winning the challenge. Bestiah, Pakita and The Macarena receive negative critiques, with Bestiah being safe. Pakita and The Macarena lip-sync to "Desátame" by Mónica Naranjo. Pakita wins the lip-sync and The Macarena sashays away.: Guest Judge: La Terremoto de Alcorcón; Mini-Challenge: Reading is Fundamental; Mini-Challenge Winner: Pakita; Mini-Challenge Prize: €1,000 worth of products from FOREO; Main Challenge: Snatch Game; Runway Theme: Arriba la pluma (Show Your Feathers); Challenge Winner: Pink Chadora; Challenge Prize: A €2,500 cash tip; Bottom Two: Pakita and The Macarena; Lip-Sync Song: "Desátame" by Mónica Naranjo; Eliminated: The Macarena; Farewell Message: "Nunca, Nunca, Nunca Os Rindais, Os quiero mucho. PD Tonta la que lo lea. The Macarena." ("Never, Never, Never Give Up, I love you so much. PS Silly the one who reads this. The Macarena")
26	6	"El Mago Precoz"	May 21, 2023
For this week's main challenge, the queens perform in El Mago Precoz: The Musical (The Wizard of Oz: The Musical).: Bestiah plays Bruja Mala (Wicked Witch); Clover Bish plays Doro; Hornella Góngora plays Mago Precoz (Precocious Wizard); Pakita plays Drag Sin Valor (Cowardly Drag Queen); Pink Chadora plays Tea; Pitita plays Drag Sin Cerebro (Brainless Drag Queen); Vania Vainilla plays Bruja Buena (Good Witch); Visa plays Drag Sin Corazón (Heartless Drag Queen); On the runway, category is Tres Looks en Uno (Tree Looks in One). Hornella Góngora, Pitita and Vania Vainilla receive positive critiques, with Pitita winning the challenge. Clover Bish, Pakita and Visa receive negative critiques, with Pakita being safe. Clover Bish and Visa lip-sync to "Dime" by Beth. Clover Bish wins the lip-sync and Visa sashays away.: Guest Judge: Mónica Cruz; Main Challenge: El Mago Precoz: The Musical (The Wizard of Oz: The Musical); Runway Theme: Tres Looks en Uno (Three Looks in One); Challenge Winner: Pitita; Challenge Prize: A €2,500 cash tip and jewelry from Aster Lab; Bottom Two: Clover Bish and Visa; Lip-Sync Song: "Dime" by Beth; Eliminated: Visa; Farewell Message: "Lo más importante es lo que hay en tu mente y en tu corazón. <3 PD. Gira por Latinoamérica! Los quiere, LA GRAN VISA. <3 Wooow." ("The most important thing is what is in your mind and in your heart. <3 PS. A Latin American Tour! With love, THE GRAND VISA. <3 Wooow.")
27	7	"The Second Chance" "Segunda oportunidrag"	May 28, 2023
At the beginning of the episode, the previously eliminated queens enter the workroom. Supremme de Luxe then says that they will have a chance to return to the competition, and that there will be a double elimination. For this week's main challenge, the eliminated queens will be paired up with a remaining queen and they will perform a live stand-up comedy act in front of the judges. Visa picks Pitita, The Macarena picks Pink Chadora, Kelly Roller picks Vania Vainilla, Chanel Anorex picks Hornella Góngora, Drag Chuchi picks Bestiah and Maria Edilia picks Pakita. Clover Bish is alone, and will be the narrator of the show. On the runway, category is Peluca Palooza (Wig Palooza). Clover Bish and Vania Vainilla receive positive critiques, with Vania Vainilla winning the challenge, meaning Kelly Roller has returned to the competition. Pakita, Pink Chadora and Pitita receive negative critiques, and are announced as the bottom three. They lip-sync to "No Controles" by Olé Olé. Pitita wins the lip-sync and Pakita and Pink Chadora both sashay away.: Guest Judge: Eva Soriano; Main Challenge: Perform a live stand-up comedy routine partnered with a previous eliminated queen; Runway Theme: Peluca Palooza (Wig Palooza); Challenge Winner: Vania Vainilla; Returned: Kelly Roller; Challenge Prize: A €2,500 cash tip; Bottom Three: Pakita, Pink Chadora and Pitita; Lip-Sync Song: "No Controles" by Olé Olé; Eliminated: Pakita and Pink Chadora; Pakita's Farewell Message: "Seguid vuestro camino, nos encontraremos en tus sueños. Pakita" ("Follow your path. We will meet in your dreams. Pakita"); Pink Chadora's Farewell Message: "Quien es feliz hace feliz a los demás también. Hasta siempre, bonituras. Pink Chadora" ("They who are happy make others happy too. Goodbye, sweeties. Pink Chadora")
28	8	"One, Two, Drags!" "¡Un, dos, drags!"	June 4, 2023
For this week's mini-challenge, the queens pair up and paint each others faces while blindfolded. Bestiah and Clover Bish win the mini-challenge. For the main challenge, the queens pair up and improvise in the game show "Un, dos, drags... respondes o te vas" (One, two, three... answer or leave).: Bestiah and Vainia Vainilla; Clover Bish and Pitita; Hornella Góngora and Kelly Roller; On the runway, category is Una ilusión (Illusion). Clover Bish, Hornella Góngora and Pitita receive positive critiques, with Pitita winning the challenge. Bestiah, Kelly Roller and Vainia Vainilla receive negative critiques, with Vainia Vainilla being safe. Bestiah and Kelly Roller lip-sync to "La Niña" by María Peláe. Kelly Roller wins the lip-sync and Bestiah sashays away.: Guest Judge: María Peláe; Mini-Challenge: In pairs, paint each others faces while blindfolded; Mini-Challenge Winners: Bestiah and Clover Bish; Mini-Challenge Prize: €500 worth of products from Krash Kosmetics; Main Challenge: In pairs, improvise in the game show "Un, dos, drags... respondes o te vas" (One, two, three... answer or leave); Runway Theme: Una ilusión (Illusion); Challenge Winner: Pitita; Challenge Prize: A €2,500 cash tip; Bottom Two: Bestiah and Kelly Roller; Lip-Sync Song: "La Niña" by María Peláe; Eliminated: Bestiah; Farewell Message: "SIEMPRE LIBRES, ZORRAS E IMPARABLES. Quiero oíros rugir. OS AMO, Bestiah." ("ALWAYS FREE, BITCHES AND UNSTOPPABLE. I want to hear you roar. LOVE YOU, Bestiah.")
29	9	"Makeover: Barricientas" "Make Over: Barriencientas"	June 11, 2023
For this week's mini-challenge, the queens try not to laugh while another queen slaps you in the face with a pancake. Pitita wins the mini-challenge. For the main challenge, the queens makeover a group of cleaners. On the runway, category is Barricientas (Sweeper-Ellas). Pitita and Vania Vainilla receive positive critiques, with Vania Vainilla winning the challenge. Clover Bish, Hornella Góngora and Kelly Roller receive negative critiques, with Kelly Roller being safe. Clover Bish and Hornella Góngora lip-sync to "Vas a Volverme Loca" by Natalia. Hornella Góngora wins the lip-sync and Clover Bish sashays away.: Guest Judge: Valentina; Mini-Challenge: Try not to laugh while another queen slaps you in the face with a pancake; Mini-Challenge Winner: Pitita; Mini-Challenge Prize: A sample of products courtesy of ES Collection Cosmetics; Main Challenge: Makeover a group of cleaners; Runway Theme: Barricientas (Sweeper-Ellas); Challenge Winner: Vania Vainilla; Challenge Prize: A €2,500 cash tip; Bottom Two: Clover Bish and Hornella Góngora; Lip-Sync Song: "Vas a Volverme Loca" by Natalia; Eliminated: Clover Bish; Farewell Message: "Sed fieles a vosotre mismes y aprovechad la oportunidad. No se repite 2 veces. Os amo, Clover. <3 PD: KEEEE?!!", ("Be true to yourself and seize the opportunity. It won't be repeated. I love you, Clover. <3 PS: WHAAAT?!!")
30	10	"The Reunion - España Season 3" "El reencuentro"	June 18, 2023
The queens all return for the reunion. Discussions include, the judge's critiques, the perceived favoritism towards Pitita and the comeback challenge. It is then announced that Maria Edilia is awarded this season's Miss Congeniality and Visa is awarded Miss Look Perdido (Miss Lost Look).: Miss Congeniality: Maria Edilia; Miss Lost Look: Visa
31	11	"Grand Finale - España Season 3" "Fiebre - La final"	June 25, 2023
for the final challenge of the season, the queens write, record and perform their own verses to Supremme de Luxe's song "Fiebre". On the runway, category is Mi Mejor Look Drag (My Best Drag Look). The eliminated queens all return to the runway. Hornella Góngora and Kelly Roller are eliminated, leaving Pitita and Vania Vainilla as the top two queens of the season. They lip-sync to "Punto de partida" by Rocío Jurado. It is announced that Pitita is the winner, leaving Vania Vainilla as the runner-up.: Main Challenge: Write, record and perform their own verses to Supremme de Luxe's song "Fiebre"; Runway Theme: Mi Mejor Look Drag (My Best Drag Look); Eliminated: Hornella Góngora and Kelly Roller; Top Two: Pitita and Vania Vainilla; Lip-Sync Song: "Punto de partida" by Rocío Jurado; Runner-up: Vania Vainilla; Winner of Drag Race España Season Three: Pitita
-	-	"The Coronation: España Season 3" "La coronación"	July 1, 2023
The four finalists return to watch the premiere of the season finale in a special hosted by season 2 contestant Samantha Ballentines.
