= Belén Aguilera =

Spanish singer

- Born: September 12, 1995 (age 30); Barcelona, Spain
- Occupation: Singer

Belén Aguilera is a Spanish singer who was born in Barcelona in 1995.

== Musical Career ==
In 2014, Belén started posting covers of songs on Facebook under the pseudonym of "The Girl and the Piano".
