= Chanel Anorex =

Spanish drag performer (born 1990)

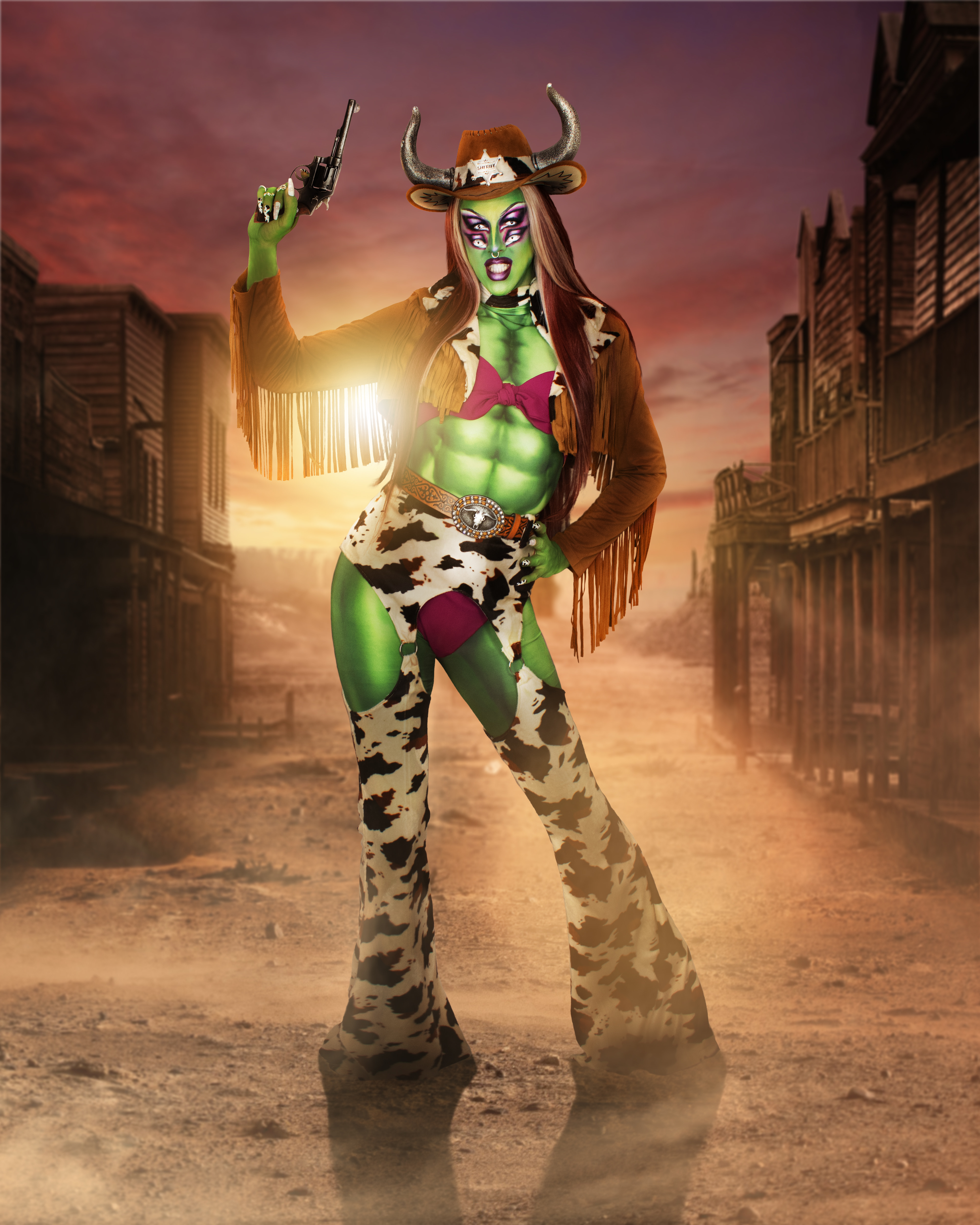
- Chanel Anorex in 2023
- Born: Cristofer Caamaño González; December 31, 1990 (age 35); Salamanca, Spain
- Occupation: Drag queen
- Television: Drag Race España (season 3)

Chanel Anorex is the stage name of Cristofer Caamaño González (born December 31, 1990), a Spanish drag queen and multidisciplinary artist known for competing on the third season of Drag Race España.

== Career ==
In 2018, Chanel Anorex was interviewed by Buzzfeed España as part of a report titled Así es ser DRAG QUEEN en España (Here's what it's like to be a drag queen in Spain). In the interview, Chanel said she had been doing drag for about a year.

In May 2022, Chanel, along with other artists, was interviewed by web publisher Cliente Global about the working conditions for drag queens in Spain.

In February 2023, Chanel performed in ROAR Party in Madrid along with drag queens Onyx and Samantha Ballentines.

In the same year, Chanel joined the third season of reality television competition Drag Race España, which premiered on April 16, 2023. In the season's third episode, Chanel was up for elimination, in which she faced Kelly Roller in a lip sync battle. Ultimately, Kelly Roller was declared the winner of the lip sync, and Chanel was eliminated from the competition.

In an interview with Gay Times, Chanel cited her drag inspirations as her own childhood, 90s horror movies, and movies like Monsters, Inc., Beetlejuice, and even Jurassic Park.

== Filmography ==
=== Television ===
Year	Title	Role	Notes
2023	Drag Race España	Herself	4 episodes
2023	Tras la carrera	Herself	1 episode

== Discography ==
=== Singles ===
- "LA RABIA" (2023)
