= The Macarena (drag queen) =

Drag performer

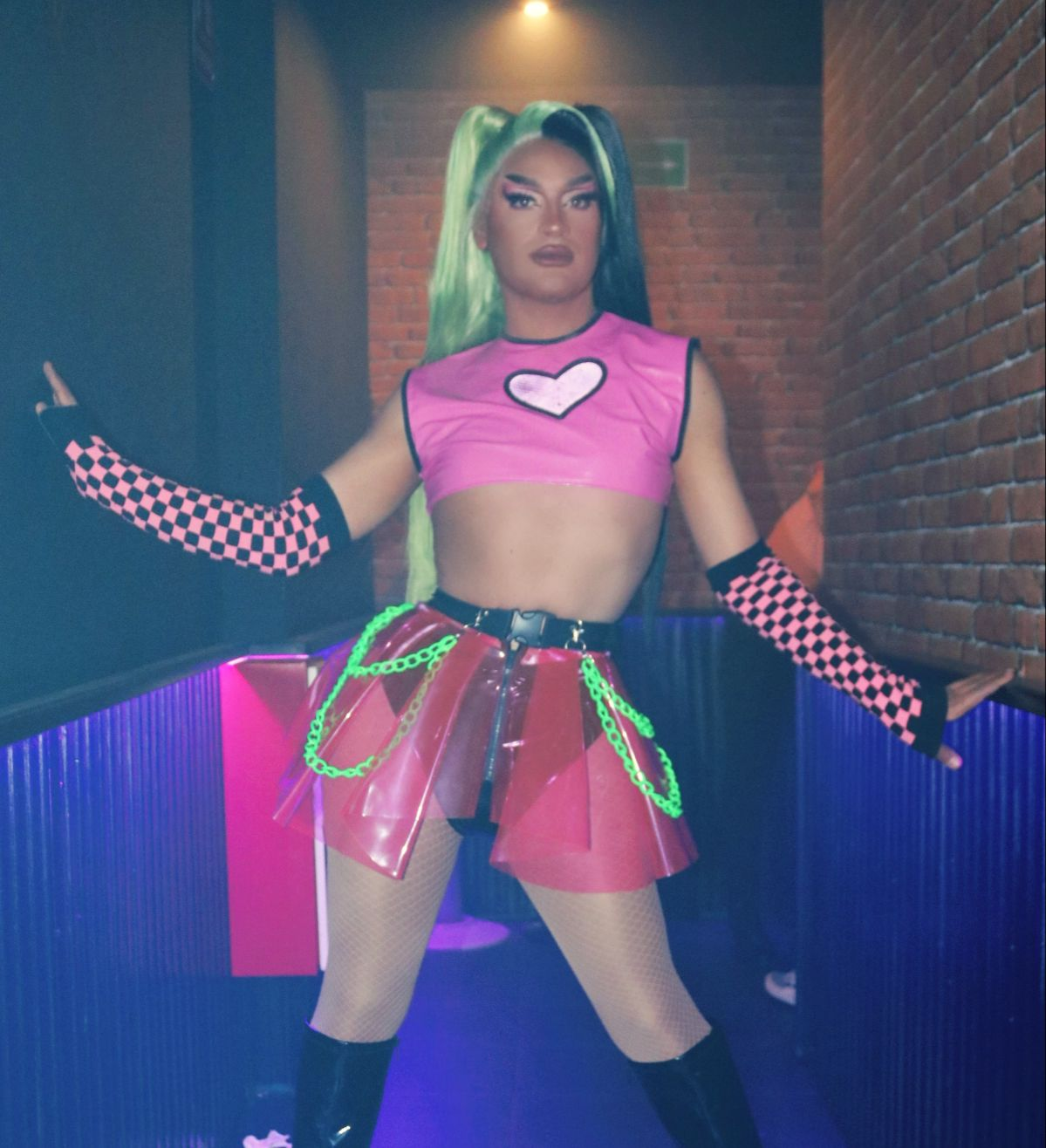
- The Macarena in 2023
- Born: 25 May 1991 (age 34); San Fernando, Cádiz, Andalusia, Spain
- Other names: Isabeau Garabito Lopez
- Television: Drag Race España (season 1, season 3)
- Website: themacarena.es

The Macarena is the stage name of Isabeau Garabito Lopez (born 25 May 1991), a Spanish drag performer who competed on the first and third seasons of Drag Race España.

== Career ==
The Macarena competed on the first and third seasons of Drag Race España. She was eliminated on the first episode of season 1, finishing tenth overall. On season 3, she finished tenth out of thirteen contestants.

== Personal life ==
Originally from San Fernando, Cádiz, The Macarena lives in La Isla. She came out as a trans woman in April 2023, and uses the pronouns she/her. The Macarena's stage name comes from Los del Río's song "Macarena" (1993).

The Macarena and season 2 contestant Samantha Ballentines are exes with a drag mother/daughter relationship.

== Filmography ==
=== Television ===
- Drag Race España (season 1, season 3)
