= Kelly Roller =

Drag performer

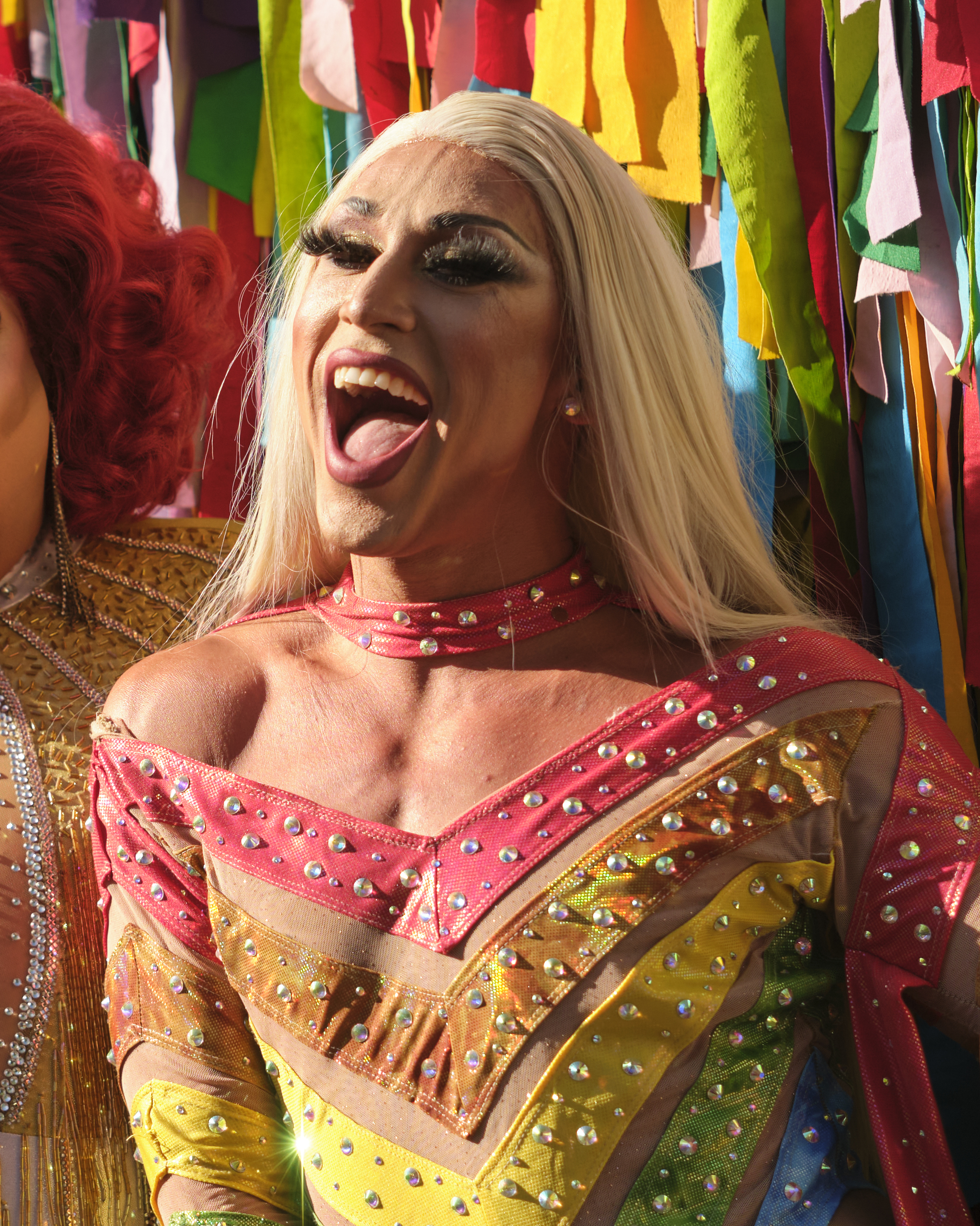
- Kelly Roller in 2023
- Born: Francisco José Cabrera Martínez; Torremolinos, Spain
- Occupations: Drag performer and singer
- Television: Drag Race España (season 3)

Francisco José Cabrera Martínez, known by the stage name Kelly Roller, is a Spanish drag queen known for competing on the third season of Drag Race España.

== Career ==
In 2018, Kelly Roller was interviewed by Togayther, a magazine focused on LGBT topics, which called her an LGBT icon. On June 11, 2021, she released a music video covering the song "Sonrisa" (Smile) by Ana Torroja. On June 23, 2022, Kelly gave the opening speech at Seville pride, the same event at which María del Monte came out by reading her manifesto, which talked about her preferences, her sexual orientation, and her girlfriend. At the end of 2022, she auditioned to compete in Benidorm Fest, the contest to select Spain's Eurovision representative, with the song "Safari".

In 2023, Kelly Roller joined the third season of reality television competition Drag Race España, which premiered on April 16, 2023. In the third episode, Kelly roller was rated as one of the worst, which lead to her competing in a lip sync battle against fellow contestant Chanel Anorex. Kelly won the lip sync, saving herself from elimination. In the fourth episode, she was once again in nominated for elimination, competing this time against Clover Bish to the song "Ay mamá" by Rigoberta Bandini. Ultimately, Clover Bish won the lip sync, and Kelly Roller became the fourth eliminated queen of the season. Kelly returned in the seventh episode, which was focused on choosing which of the eliminated contestants would return to the competition. In the eighth episode, the judges again nominated her for elimination, but she remained on the show after being declared safe in a lip sync battle against Bestiah. Kelly Roller ultimately became one of the season's four finalists.

On June 18, 2023, she performed in Cullera's LGBT pride celebration together with drag artists Libertad Montero and Drag Skíky.

== Filmography ==
=== Television ===
Year	Title	Role	Notes
2023	Drag Race España	Herself	8 episodes
2023	Tras la carrera	Herself	1 episode

== Discography ==
=== Singles ===
Year	Title
2018	Ritual
2019	Sólo No Te Irás
2020	Amor Propio
2020	Soy Lo Que Soy
2020	Sonrisa
2021	Amor Propio (Re-recorded)
2021	Tu Instagram
2022	Dramas y comedias
2022	Viceversa
2022	La esencia de tu voz
2023	Absolutamente (with Sandra Montiel)
2023	Power Bottom
2023	Sube a mi nube (Electricitas)
2024	Sin tu amor
2024	Embrujada
2025	Otro amor vendrá
