= Pink Chadora =

Drag performer

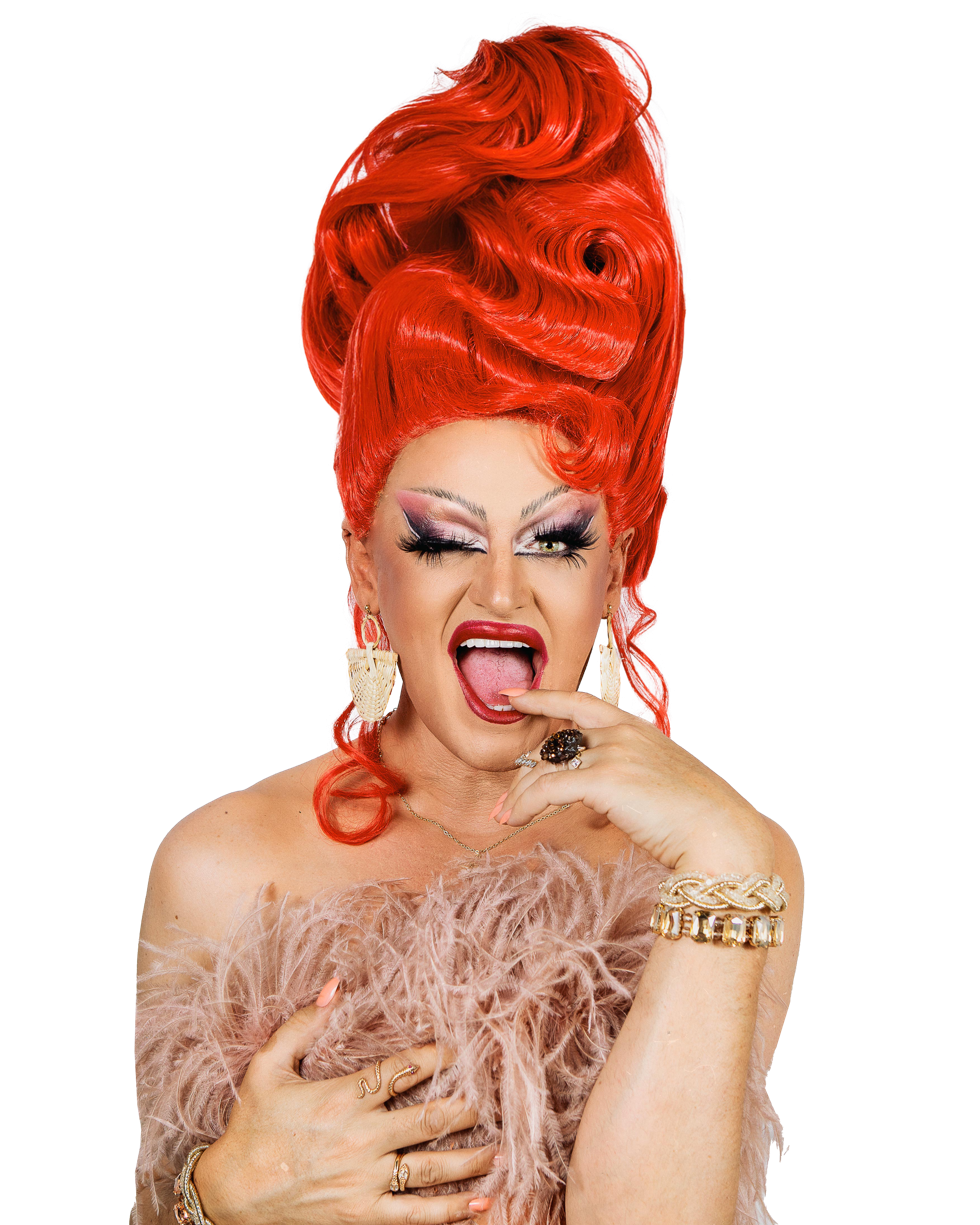
- Pink Chadora in 2023
- Born: Martín de Arriba; Algeciras, Spain
- Occupations: Drag queen, photographer
- Television: Drag Race España (season 3)
- Spouse: Ángelo Néstore
- Website: pinkchadora.com

Pink Chadora is the stage name of Martín de Arriba, a Spanish drag queen and multidisciplinary artist who competed on the third season of Drag Race España and the first season of Drag Race España All Stars.

== Career ==
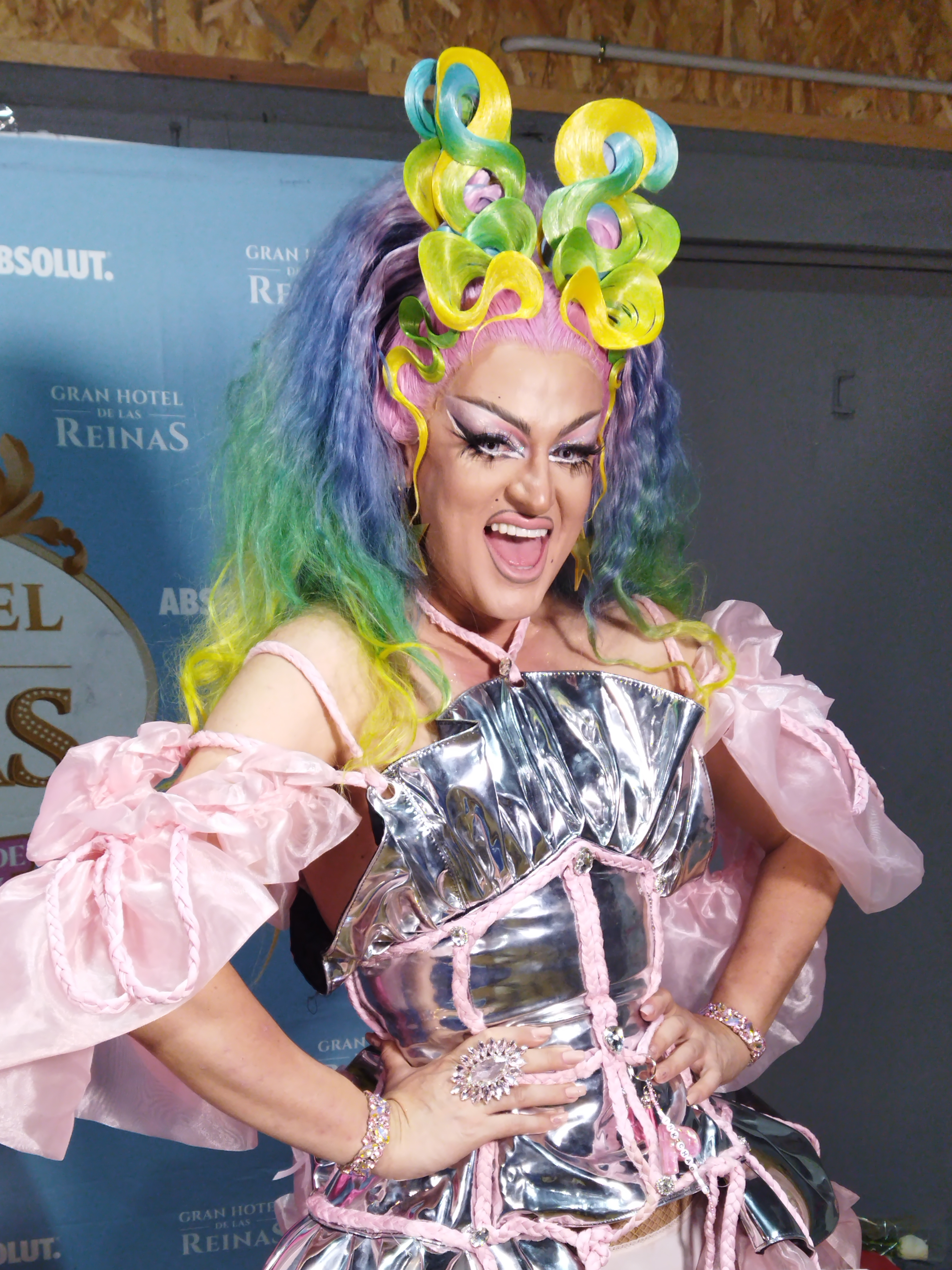
Pink Chadora at Gran Hotel de las Reinas 2023 in Madrid

Pink Chadora began doing drag in 2019 at age 35. She participated in the theatrical production "Desátame" ("Untie me") with Drag Race UK queen Choriza May and the poet Ángelo Néstore. She also gave a poetry reading in the Carmen Thyssen Museum in Málaga.

Her drag name is based on the word play on the term "pinchadora" (translation note: "pinchar discos" is a term for being a DJ, but "pinchar" can also mean "to prick." A "pinchador" would be "one who pricks." Adding the -a to the end makes the word feminine), because she has worked as a DJ at various cultural events, and the color pink, which characterizes her aesthetic. She conceives of drag as an "artistic, joyful, and political idea" capable of social acceptance and, at the same time, entertaining the viewer. With this perspective, she questions the conventions of drag, transforming herself into a daytime artist that brings the art of drag to children too, getting out "of her comfort zone, out of the world of nightlife, out of the nightclubs and bars." Furthermore, she has a goal of spreading the culture of drag in rural areas, far from the big cities.

In 2023, she was announced as one of the 13 contestants of the third season of Drag Race España, the Spanish version of the Drag Race franchise, hosted by Supremme de Luxe with Javier Calvo, Javier Ambrossi, and Ana Locking as judges. In one of the show's most well-known challenges, Snatch Game, she impersonated Lola Flores, which secured her the win for the episode. Additionally, she won the dance challenge "Dragvisión" (a parody of Eurovision) in the second episode thanks to her humor, eating a sandwich in the middle of the performance. In the seventh episode, the judges nominated Pink Chadora, along with Pitita and Pakita for elimination. The queens competed in a lip sync battle to the song "No controles" by Olé Olé. Ultimately, Pitita won the lip sync, while Pink Chadora, along with Pakita, were eliminated.

== Filmography ==
=== Television ===
- Regias del Drag España (2022)
- Drag Race España (2023)
- Gran Hotel de las Reinas, histeria de un crimen (2023)
- Drag Race España All Stars (2024)
- Reacción en cadena (2024)
- Reportera en el Especial Orgullo de MovistarPlus (2024)

=== Film ===
- TransUniversal (2023), documentary (premiere at the Málaga Film Festival)

== Discography ==
=== Singles ===
- Natural Candy (2023)
- Muñecota (2024)

== Works ==
=== Poetry ===
- Todo era campo (Everything used to be fields) (Málaga, Letraversal, 2023) ISBN 978-84-126400-9-0
