= Pakita =

Drag performer

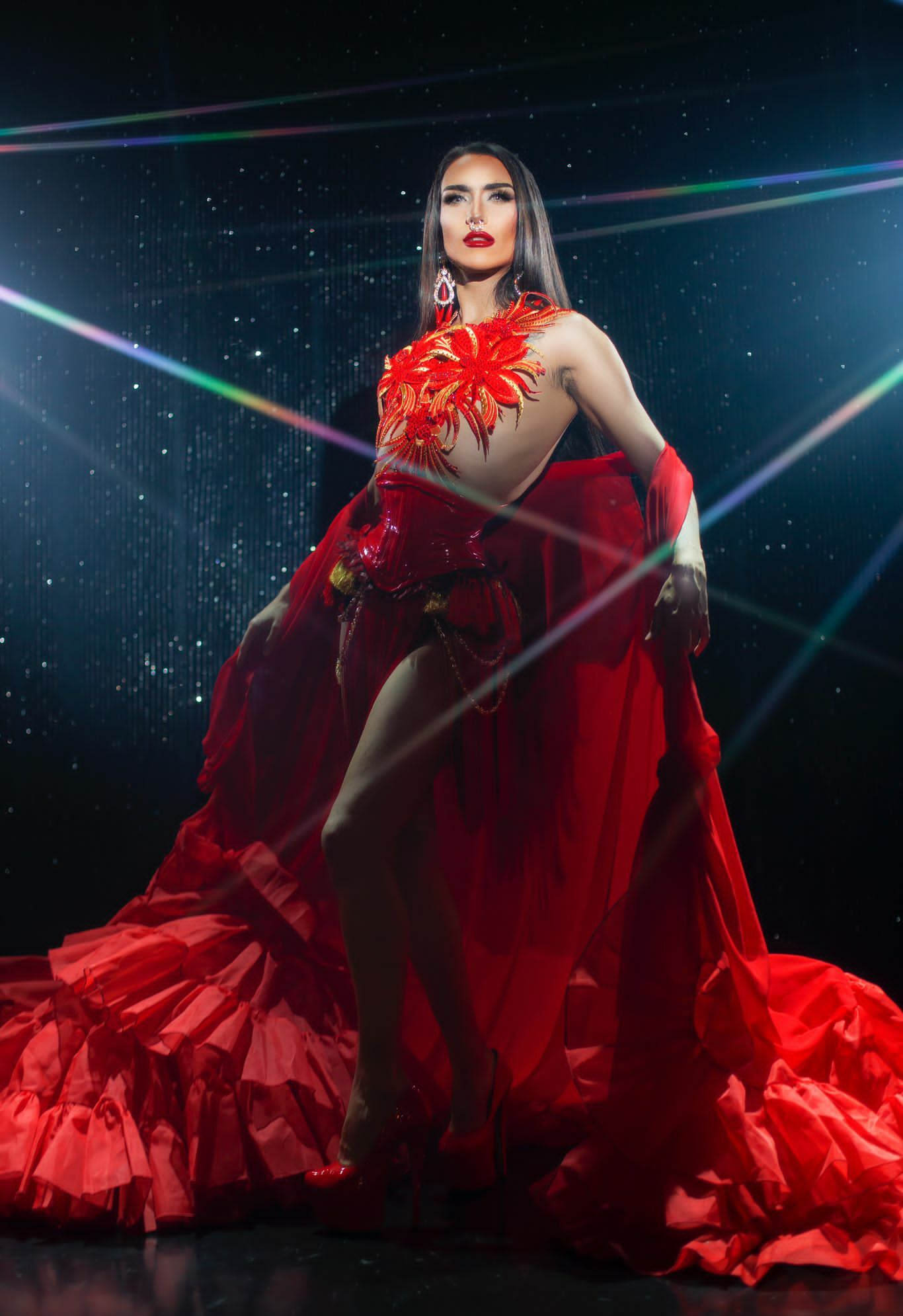
- Pakita in 2023
- Born: Francisco Jose Venegas Morales; 1993 (age 32–33); Seville, Andalusia, Spain
- Other names: Franciska "Pakita" Tólika
- Occupation: Drag queen
- Years active: 2013–present

Pakita, also known as Franciska "Pakita" Tólika, is the stage name of Francisco José Venegas Morales (born 1993), a Spanish drag performer who has competed on the second season of The Switch Drag Race, the third season of Drag Race España, and the first season of Drag Race España All Stars.

== Early life ==
Morales was born in Seville, Andalusia, Spain in 1993. He started doing drag while studying fashion design at the age of 20, and, in 2013, moved to Madrid to expand his career. While there, he worked at a makeup store.

== Career ==
In 2018, Pakita was revealed as one of the 15 contestants on the second season of Chilean drag competition series The Switch Drag Race, making her the first Spanish contestant in the Drag Race franchise. She placed in the bottom in the first episode and lost a duel against Marie Laveau, making her the first elimination of the season.

In 2023, she was announced as one of the 13 contestants on the third season of Drag Race España. After being placed in the bottom in the fifth episode, she eliminated The Macarena in a lip-sync battle to Mónica Naranjo's "Desátame". Pakita was eventually eliminated in the seventh episode, during a double elimination alongside Pink Chadora.
