= María Edilia =

Venezuelan drag performer

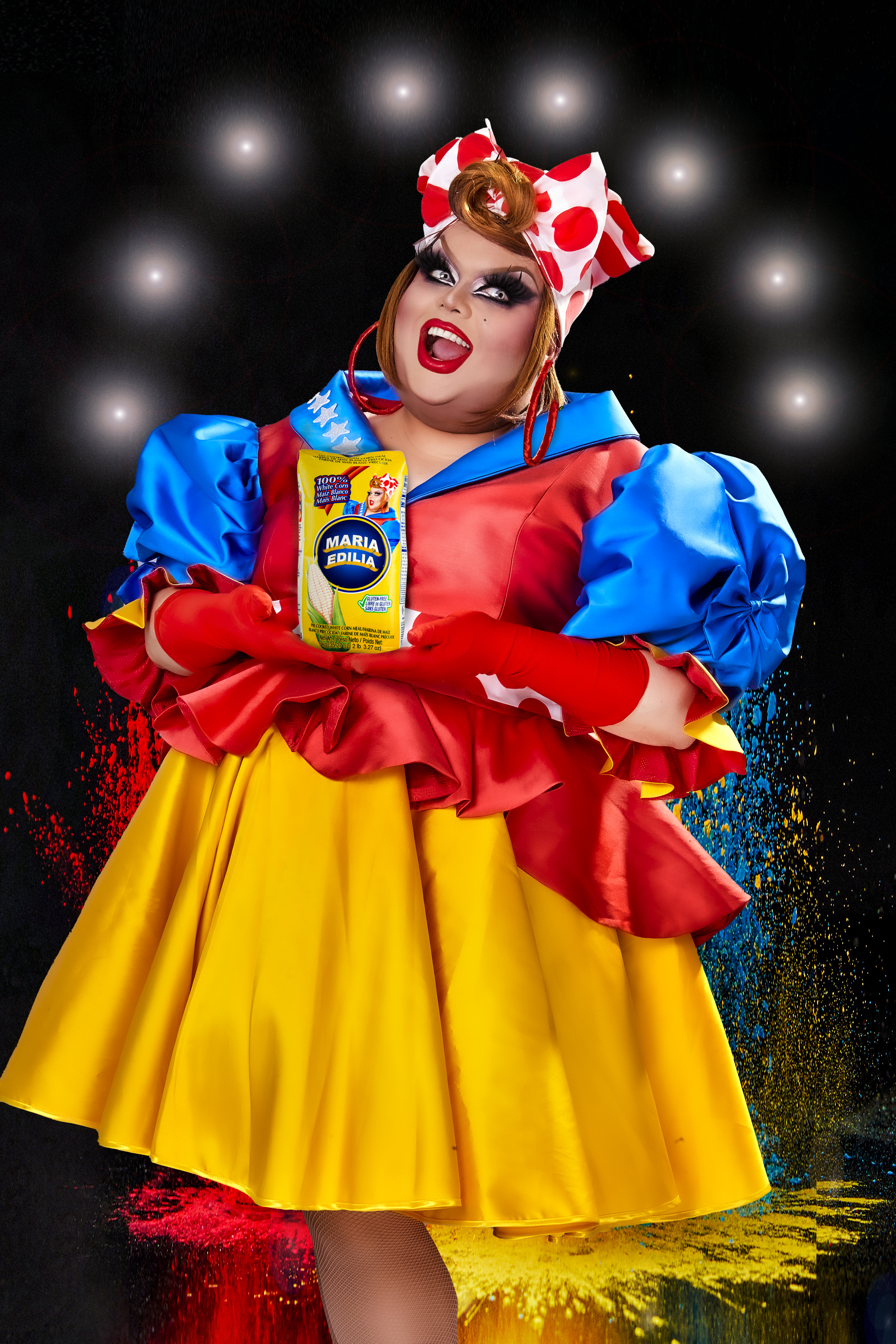
- María Edilia in 2023
- Born: Edixon Felipe Calanche Varela; Maracay, Venezuela
- Occupation: Drag queen
- Television: Drag Race España (season 3)
- Website: mariaedilia.com

María Edilia is the stage name of Edixon Felipe Calanche Varela, a Venezuelan drag queen known for competing on the third season of Drag Race España.

== Career ==
María Edilia's first exposure to drag culture was when she started attending drag shows. Also, at a young age, she met a former Eurovision winner, Dana International, who she greatly admired. In 2000, at 23 years old, María performed as a drag queen for the first time in a drag contest at the nightclub La Vía, in the Centro Comercial Mamayeya. She came in as the first runner up in the contest and has been doing drag since. Her drag name comes from the name of a winner of a Venezuelan reality show and her mother, who is also called María Edilia.

In 2017, María Edilia immigrated, moving to Madrid, Spain, where she struck up a friendship with the drag artist La Plexy and began to perform at the nightclub Black & White. In 2022, she starred in the production Qué! infierno de cabaret, directed by Rubén Calvente, with Lady Savannah and Manu Barea.

In 2023, María Edilia joined the third season of the reality television competition Drag Race España, which premiered on April 16, 2023. In the first episode, after receiving negative critiques from the judges, especially regarding her performance in the maxi-challenge, María Edilia was up for elimination along with Drag Chuchi. They faced off in a lip sync battle to the song "Despechá" by Rosalía in which Drag Chuchi emerged victorious, making María Edilia the first contestant to be eliminated from the season. She was later awarded the title of Miss Congeniality during the reunion episode at the end of the season.

== Filmography ==
=== Television ===
Year	Title	Role	Notes
2020	Veneno	Sex Shop Drag Queen	1 episode
2023	Meet the Queens	Herself	1 episode
2023	Drag Race España	Herself	4 episode
2023	Tras la carrera	Herself	1 episode

- Bring Back My Girls (2024)

=== Podcast ===
Year	Title	Role	Notes
2022	Canelis & Dragonas	Guest	1 episode
