= Drag Chuchi =

Drag performer

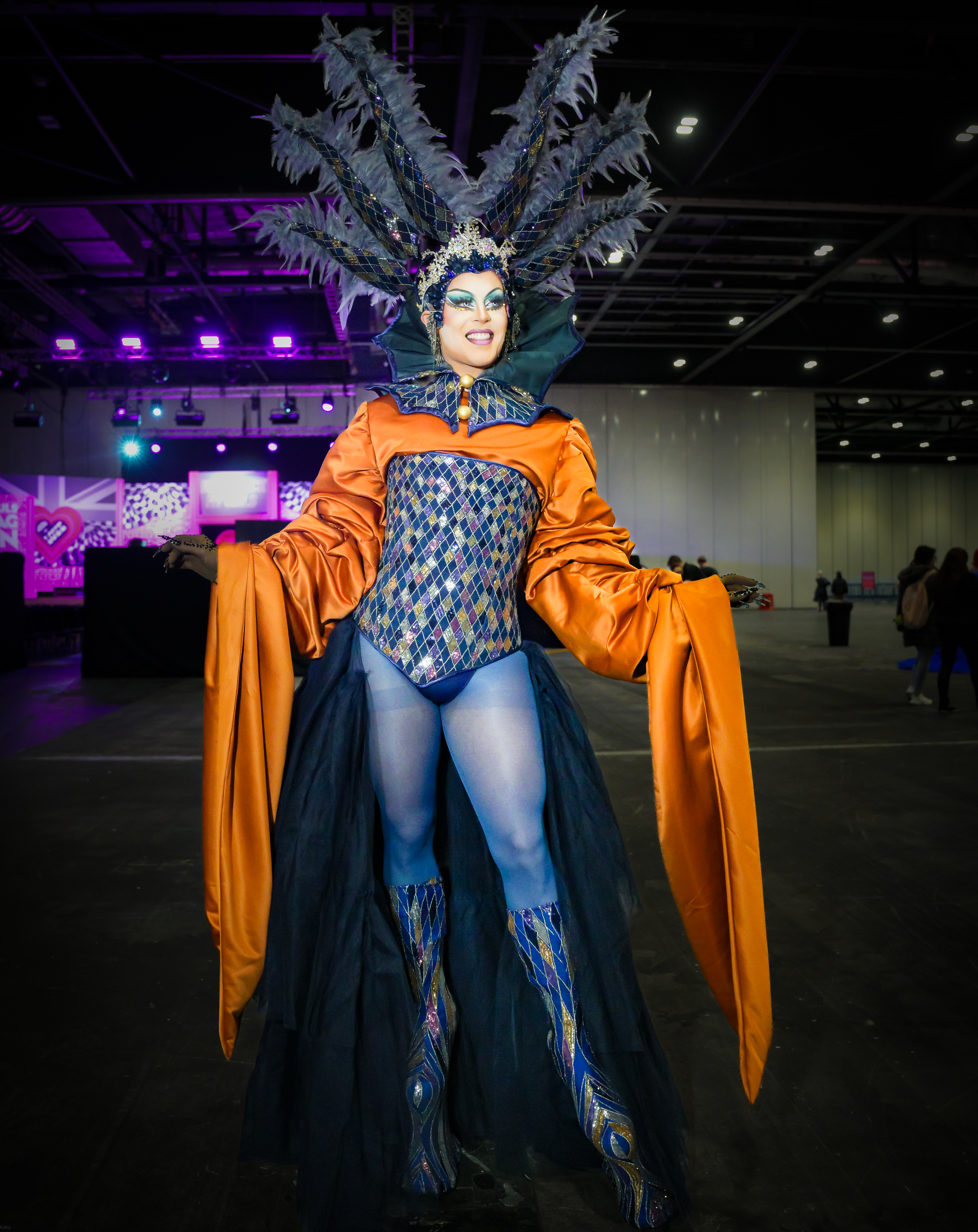
- Drag Chuchi in 2024
- Born: Pedro Alberto Bethencourt Guerra; June 15, 1990 (age 35); Las Palmas, Spain
- Occupation: Drag queen
- Television: Drag Race España (season 3)
- Website: dragchuchi.com

Drag Chuchi is the stage name of Pedro Alberto Bethencourt Guerra (born June 15, 1990), a drag queen and multidisciplinary artist known for winning the Drag Queen Gala at the Carnival of Las Palmas in 2019 and for competing on the third season of Drag Race España.

== Career ==
Drag Chuchi competed in the 2019 Drag Queen Gala at the Carnival of Las Palmas in 2019, becoming that year's winner thanks to her performance, "Repite mi nombre" (Say my name).

In 2022, a gigantic canvas, measuring 53.95 by 15.55 meters (177.0 by 51.0 ft), with Drag Chuchi's picture was installed on Goya Street in Madrid to promote the Drag Queen Gala at the Carnival of Las Palmas. The same year, she returned to perform in the Drag Gala, this time inspired by the fires in the Gran Canaria.

In 2023, Chuchi joined the third season of the reality television competition Drag Race España, which premiered on April 16, 2023. In the first episode of the season, Chuchi was nominated for elimination, along with fellow contestant María Edilla. They faced off in a lip sync battle to the song "Despechá" by Rosalía. Chuchi ultimately won the lip sync and María Edilla was the first queen to be eliminated from the season. In the second episode, Chuchi was again up for elimination after negative critiques from the judges. She faced Vania Vainilla in a lip sync to "La noche es para mí" by Soraya. Vania was declared the winner of the lip sync and Chuchi became the second queen eliminated from the season.

== Filmography ==
=== Television ===
Year	Title	Role	Notes
2023	Drag Race España	Herself	3 episodes
2023	Tras la carrera	Herself	1 episode

- Bring Back My Girls

== Discography ==
=== Singles ===
- "Ya te lo dije" (I already told you) (2022)
