= Hornella Góngora =

Spanish drag performer

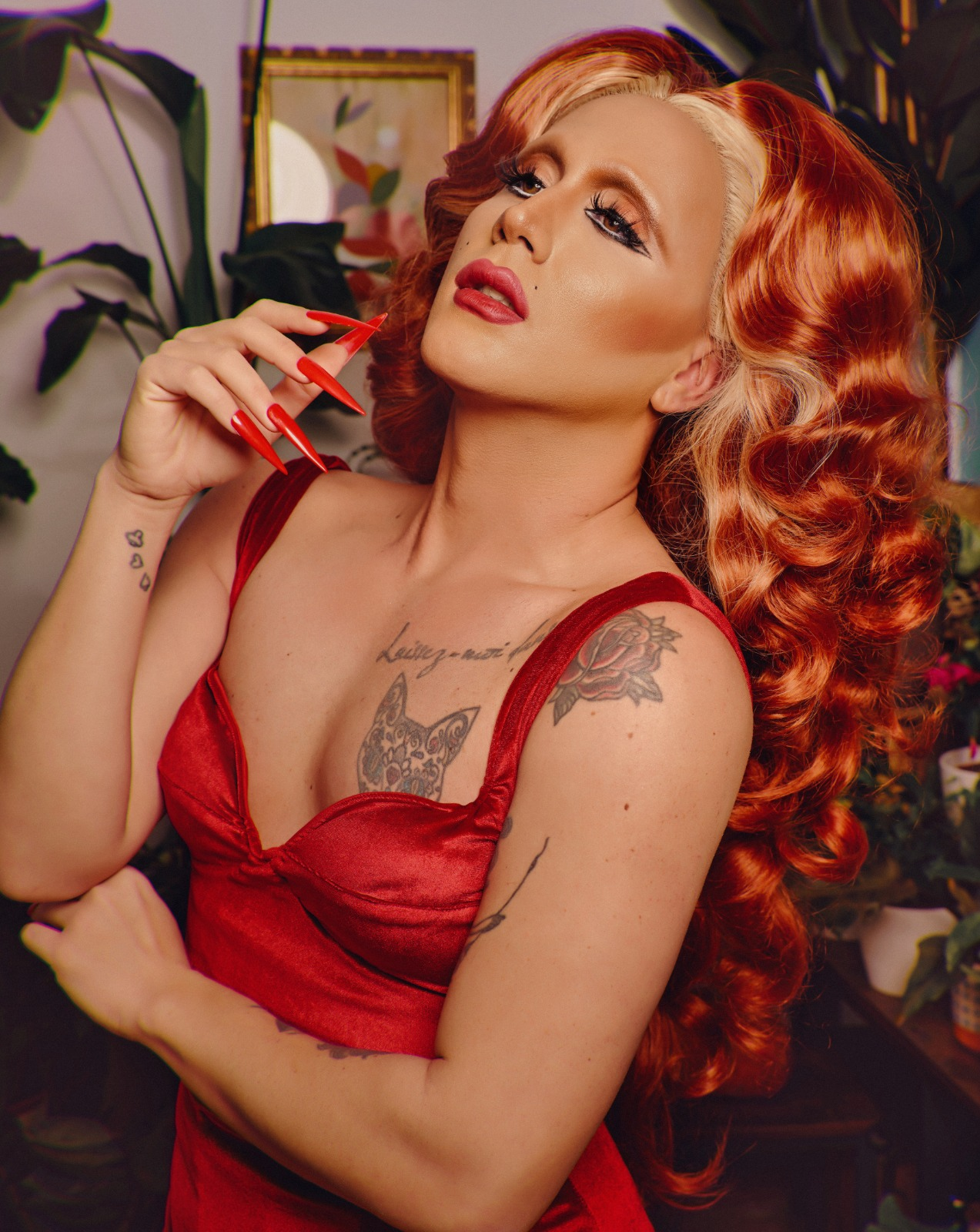
- Hornella Góngora in 2023
- Born: Javier Sevillano Jiménez; Alicante, Spain
- Occupation: Drag performer
- Television: Drag Race España (season 3)
- Website: hornellagongora.com

Hornella Góngora is the stage name of Javier Sevillano Jiménez, a Spanish drag performer known for competing on the third season of Drag Race España and the first season of Drag Race España All Stars.

== Career ==
The name Hornella Góngora comes from a combination of the name of her old pet, Hornella, and Calle Góngora, the name of the street she used to live on. She began doing drag in 2009 and was a part of the drag show Que trabaje Rita. Some of her key artistic and professional inspirations are Mina Mazzini, Marlene Dietrich, and Rita Hayworth, as well as films by Spanish director Pedro Almodóvar.

In October 2016, she released her second song, "Amor irracional" (Irrational Love). In 2021, she had a small role in the Atresmedia movie Una Navidad con Samantha Hudson (Christmas with Samantha Hudson), in which she also performed the song "Vuelve a Casa Vuelve" (Come Home, Come Back) with fellow drag artists Kika Lorace, La Prohibida, and Gad Yola.

In 2023, Hornella Góngora joined the third season of reality television show Drag Race España, which premiered on April 16, 2023. In the fourth episode, for the "My Worst Self" runway, she presented a radical look that represented the chapter of her life in which she drew into herself after being diagnosed with HIV to spread a message of acceptance for people who are HIV-positive. Hornella Góngora became a top four finalist.

In May of the same year, she gave the opening speech at the LGBT pride event Festival LGTBI+ + DIVERSA in Elche, along with drag queen Venedita Von Däsh.

== Filmography ==
=== Television ===
| Year | Title | Role | Notes |
|---|---|---|---|
| 2021 | Una Navidad con Samantha Hudson (Christmas with Samantha Hudson) | Herself | Movie |
| 2023 | Drag Race España | Herself | 11 episodes |

== Discography ==
=== Singles ===
| Year | Title |
|---|---|
| 2015 | "Thunder" |
| 2016 | "Amor Irracional" |
| 2020 | "Mi Cama Es Grande" |
