= Clover Bish =

Spanish drag performer (born 1998)

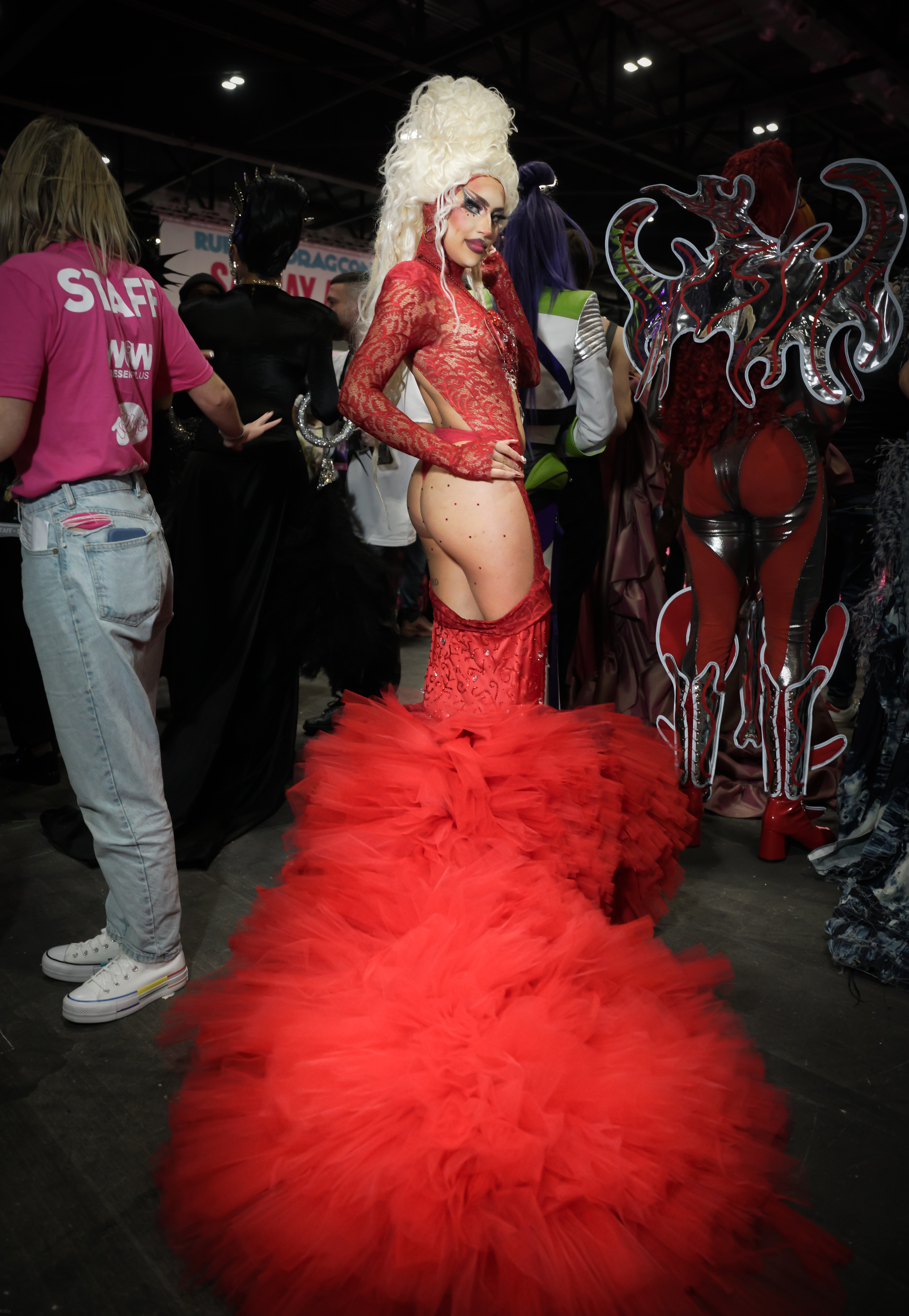
- Clover Bish in 2024
- Born: Ariadna Congost Quesada; 9 March 1998 (age 27); Granollers, Catalonia, Spain
- Occupations: Drag queen; singer
- Years active: 2022–present
- Musical career
- Instrument: Vocals
- Website: cloverbish.com

Ariadna Congost Quesada (born 9 March 1998), better known by her stage name Clover Bish, is a Spanish drag performer who rose to fame for participating in the third season of Drag Race España.

== Career ==
The first name of Congost's drag persona comes from the character of the same name in the French-Canadian animated series Totally Spies!. In 2022, Clover Bish was chosen as the winner of Shantay Party, which also helped her to reach the final selection process for the casting of the third season of Drag Race España (2023). Clover Bish released her debut single "Sí Soy Mujer", with a music video.

Bish was officially announced as one of the contestants for the third season of Drag Race España, which began airing on 16 April 2023. She became the first cisgender female drag performer to compete in the Spanish reality series, and the second in the Drag Race franchise, after Victoria Scone. During her time in the series, she was placed at the bottom twice, eliminating Kelly Roller and Visa. She was eliminated from the competition after losing a lip-sync to "Vas a volverme loca" by Natalia against Hornella Góngora. She portrayed Maite Galdeano during Snatch Game.

== Personal life ==
Congost is of Afro-Cuban descent. She is bisexual, and lives in Barcelona.

== Discography ==
=== Singles ===
List of singles
Title	Year	Album
"Sí Soy Mujer"	2023	TBA

== Filmography ==
=== Television ===
List of television credits
Year	Title	Role	Notes	Ref.
2023	Drag Race España (season 3)	Herself/Contestant	5th place	
2023	Tras La Carrera	Herself/Guest	Aftershow	

- Bring Back My Girls

=== Web series ===
List of web series credits
Year	Title	Role	Notes	Ref.
2023	Meet the Queens	Herself	Stand-alone special	

=== Music videos ===
List of music video credits
Title	Year	Album	Director(s)	Ref.
"Sí Soy Mujer"	2023	TBA	Ariadna Congost Quesada	
