= List of Drag Race España episodes =

Drag Race España (sometimes called Drag Race Spain) is a Spanish reality competition streaming television series, produced by Atresmedia Televisión in collaboration with Buendía Estudios and executive produced by World of Wonder. It is the Spanish adaptation of the Drag Race franchise. In a similar format to the American version, the show features a crop of Spanish drag queens as they compete for a grand prize of €30,000 and the title of "Spain's Next Drag Superstar". The series airs on ATRESplayer Premium in Spain and on WOW Presents Plus elsewhere.

The first season premiered on 30 May 2021. The series was later renewed for a second season, which premiered on March 27, 2022., and a third season, which premiered in April 16, 2023. An All Stars version with past contestants was also announced to be aired after the third season.

== Series overview ==
Season	Contestants	Episodes	Originally released		Winner	Runner(s)-up	Miss Congeniality
Season	Contestants	Episodes	First released	Last released	Winner	Runner(s)-up	Miss Congeniality
1	10	9	30 May 2021	25 July 2021	Carmen Farala	Killer Queen; Sagittaria	Pupi Poisson
2	12	11	27 March 2022	5 June 2022	Sharonne	Estrella Xtravaganza; Venedita Von Däsh	Samantha Ballentines
3	13	11	16 April 2023	25 June 2023	Pitita	Vania Vainilla	María Edilia
4	12	12	22 September 2024	15 December 2024	Le Cocó	La Bella Vampi (Note: La Bella Vampi is known as Vampirashian until the season finale.)	Dita Dubois
5	12	11	28 September 2025	7 December 2025	Satín Greco	Margarita Kalifata	Nori
6	12	TBA	27 September 2026	2026	TBA	TBA	TBA

== Episodes ==
=== Season 1 (2021) ===
No. overall	No. in series	Title	Original release date
1	1	"¡Bienvenidas a España!" "Bienvenidas Reinas"	30 May 2021
2	2	"Divas"	6 June 2021
3	3	"Mocatriz"	13 June 2021
4	4	"Snatch Game - España Season 1" "Snatch Game"	20 June 2021
5	5	"The Art of Drag" "Básica o cínica"	27 June 2021
6	6	"Drags de la Comedia"	4 July 2021
7	7	"Final Four" "Titanes del drag"	11 July 2021
8	8	"The Reunion" "El reencuentro"	18 July 2021
9	9	"Grand Finale" "La gran final"	25 July 2021
-	-	"Reaction from the Queen: España Season 1" "La coronación"	1 August 2021

=== Season 2 (2022) ===
No. overall	No. in series	Title	Original release date
10	1	"The New Presentation" "La nueva promoción"	27 March 2022
11	2	"Supremme Eleganza Talent Extravaganza"	3 April 2022
12	3	"Putricia's Diary" "El diario de Putricia"	10 April 2022
13	4	"The Drag Calling" "La Llamadrag"	17 April 2022
14	5	"Snatch Game"	24 April 2022
15	6	"The Spanish Ball - 10th, 20th, and 30th Century" "The Spanish Ball, siglos X, XX y XXX"	1 May 2022
16	7	"Come to Spain!"	8 May 2022
17	8	"Comedy Club Roast" "Drags de la comedia"	15 May 2022
18	9	"Golden Boys Makeover"	22 May 2022
19	10	"The Reunion" "El reencuentro"	29 May 2022
20	11	"Take Me to Heaven" "Llévame al cielo"	5 June 2022
-	-	"Reaction from the Queens" "La coronación"	12 June 2022

=== Season 3 (2023) ===
No. overall	No. in season	Title	Original release date
21	1	"Spain is Different" "Supremme Eleganza Talent Extravaganza"	April 16, 2023
22	2	"Drag Vision" "Dragvisión"	April 23, 2023
23	3	"The Great Ball of Regions" "El gran ball de las regiones"	April 30, 2023
24	4	"Drag Sequels" "Secuelas de terror drag"	May 7, 2023
25	5	"Snatch Game - España Season 3" "Snatch Game"	May 14, 2023
26	6	"El Mago Precoz"	May 21, 2023
27	7	"The Second Chance" "Segunda oportunidrag"	May 28, 2023
28	8	"One, Two, Drags!" "¡Un, dos, drags!"	June 4, 2023
29	9	"Makeover: Barricientas" "Make Over: Barriencientas"	June 11, 2023
30	10	"The Reunion - España Season 3" "El reencuentro"	June 18, 2023
31	11	"Grand Finale - España Season 3" "Fiebre - La final"	June 25, 2023
-	-	"The Coronation: España Season 3" "La coronación"	July 1, 2023

=== Season 4 (2024) ===
No. overall	No. in season	Title	Original release date
32	1	"Travel In Time" "Viaje en el tiempo"	September 22, 2024
33	2	"Night of the Stars" "Noche de Estrellas"	September 29, 2024
34	3	"Aquí No Hay Quien Diva"	October 6, 2024
35	4	"I'm That Girl from School" "Soy aquella niña de la escuela"	October 13, 2024
36	5	"Snatch Game - España Season 4" "Snatch Game"	October 20, 2024
37	6	"Legendary Queens, The Musical" "Eternas, el musical"	October 27, 2024
38	7	"La Draguería Del Coleccionista"	November 3, 2024
39	8	"Roast: Marichocho Awards" "¡Llega el roast!"	November 10, 2024
40	9	"Makeover: Drag Legends"	November 17, 2024
41	10	"The Reunion"	November 24, 2024
42	11	"Grand Finale"	December 1, 2024
43	12	"The Final Battle"	December 15, 2024

=== Season 5 (2025) ===
No. overall	No. in series	Title	Original release date
44	1	"My Heart Is Rejoicing" "Tengo el corazón contento"	28 September 2025
45	2	"The Secret of Boner Bridge" "El secreto de Puente Tieso"	5 October 2025
46	3	"Red and Rossy Carpet" "La alfombra Rossy"	12 October 2025
47	4	"Manifest, The Festival" "Manifest"	19 October 2025
48	5	"Snatch and Serve" "Snatch Game"	26 October 2025
49	6	"The Musical: Vais A Volverme Lorca" "Vais a volverme Lorca"	2 November 2025
50	7	"Dragselling Houses"	9 November 2025
51	8	"The Notary Yasstaria"	16 November 2025
52	9	"Makeover: Queen of My Hometown"	23 November 2025
53	10	"Return of the Queens"	30 November 2025
54	11	"A Heart-Stopping Finale"	7 December 2025

=== Season 6 (2026) ===
No. overall	No. in season	Title	Original release date
55	1	TBA	27 September 2026
