= Diamante Merybrown =

Spanish drag performer

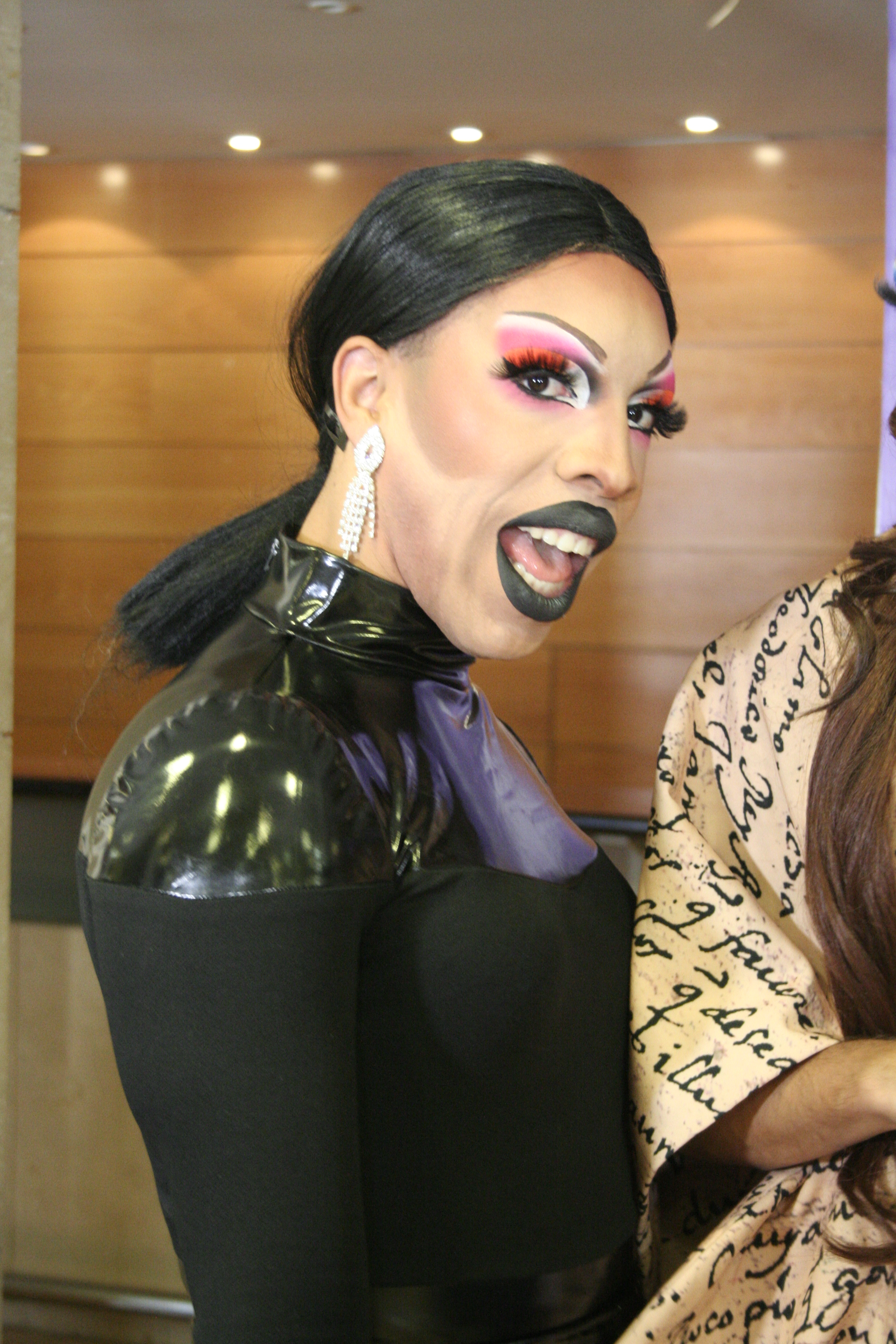
- Diamante Merybrown in 2022
- Born: Jhemmler Castillo Germán; October 29, 1995 (age 30); Santiago de los Caballeros, Dominican Republic
- Occupation: Drag performer
- Television: Drag Race España (season 2)

Diamante Merybrown is the stage name of Jhemmler Castillo Germán (born October 29, 1995), a Dominican dancer, choreographer, dance professor, and drag queen now located in Spain who is most known for competing on season 2 of Drag Race España.

== Career ==
Castillo's alter-ego was born during a contest she participated in while living in Australia. Before migrating to Spain, she combined the art of drag with dance. She belongs to the house of Drag Reign, a drag family that she shares with Arantxa Castilla-La Mancha.

On June 18, 2021, she appeared as a guest artist in music video Disco Jet Lag by Samantha Hudson, La Prohibida, and Putochinomaricón.

As an actor, he had a minor role in the movie Una Navidad con Samantha Hudson (Christmas with Samantha Hudson), which premiered on December 19, 2021.

In 2022, she competed on season 2 of Drag Race España, the Spanish adaptation of the RuPaul's Drag Race franchise. Season 2 began airing on March 27, 2022. In the season's fifth episode, Diamante Merrybrown chose to portray RuPaul in the snatch game. Her performance received negative critiques from the judges, leading to her being up for elimination along with fellow contestant Onyx. The two queens lip synced to the song Arrasando by Thalía. Ultimately, Diamante Merrybrown won the lip sync and was able to continue in the competition. Later, in the sixth episode, Diamante was again up for elimination after bad critiques from the judges, this time along with fellow contestant Estrella Xtravaganza. They competed in a lip sync to the song Se nos rompió el amor by Rocío Jurado. Estrella ultimately won the lip sync putting an end to Diamante Merrybrown's time in the competition.

On April 4, 2022, she published her first music video, Chocolate, in which she sang as part of a collaboration with many Spanish drag artists, including Ariel Rec, Arantxa Castilla-La Mancha, Inti, Dita The Vain, and Gad Yola.

From July to December 2022, she participated in the second round of the Spanish tour Gran Hotel de las Reinas, together with the other season 2 queens.

In December of the same year, she released the song Pollo Frito (Fried Chicken) together with drag queen Choriza May.

== Personal life ==
Germán identifies as non-binary.

== Filmography ==
Year	Title	Role	Notes
2021	Una Navidad con Samantha Hudson	Herself	Movie
2022	Drag Race España	Herself	Season 2; 9 episodes
2022	Gran Hotel de las Reinas	Herself	
2022	Meet the Queens	Herself	1 episode
2023	Sí lo digo	Herself	1 episode

== Discography ==
=== Singles ===
Year	Title
2022	"Chocolate"
2022	"Pollo Frito" with Choriza May
