= Marisa Prisa =

Spanish drag performer

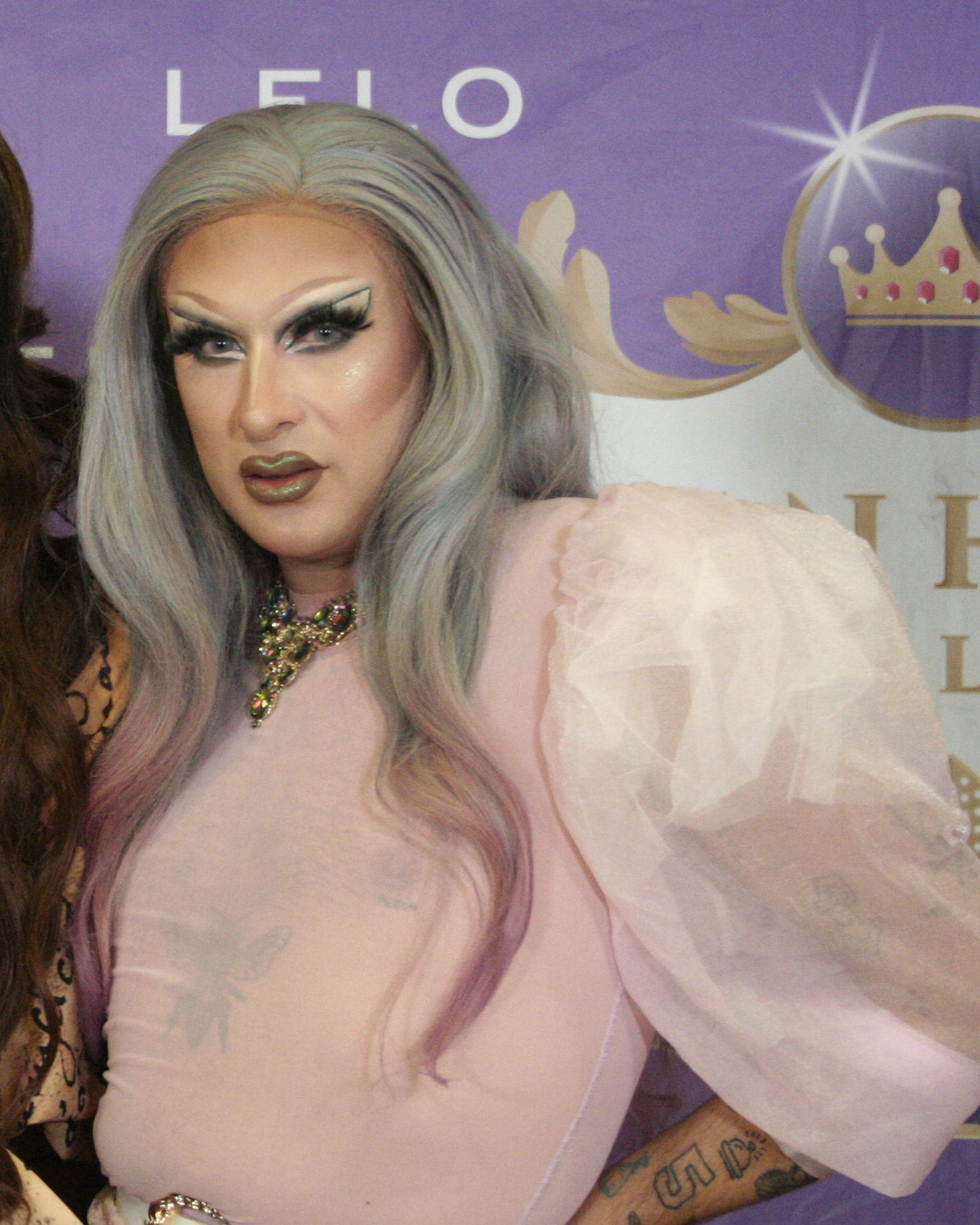
- Marisa Prisa in 2022
- Born: Javier Eijo Perales; May 9, 1993 (age 31); Lugo, Galicia, Spain
- Occupation: Drag performer
- Television: Drag Race España (season 2)

Marisa Prisa is the stage name of Javier Eijo Perales (born May 9, 1993), a Spanish drag queen, designer, and multidisciplinary artist most known for competing on season 2 of Drag Race España.

== Career ==
Marisa Prisa began her career in the art of drag by creating her persona for a party in which supposedly all the men would be cross-dressing, which ultimately turned out not to be true. However, this led to Marisa beginning to explore her gender expression and take her first steps in drag.

On March 18, 2022, she performed in a ROAR Party with fellow drag artists Ariel Rec and Extrella Xtravaganza.

In 2022, Marisa Prisa joined season 2 of reality television show Drag Race España, which began airing in March 2022. In the first episode, she fell into the bottom two and was ultimately eliminated after being defeated in the lip sync battle by Samantha Ballentines. Together with the rest of the eliminated queens, Marisa returned for a special reunion episode at the end of the season, just before the finale.

Once the season ended, Marisa went on to join the national tour Gran Hotel de las Reinas. In September of the same year, she was interviewed along with fellow competitors Ariel Rec and Juriji der Klee for the Catalonian publication Coliseum.

== Filmography ==
=== Television ===
Year	Title	Role	Notes
2022	Drag Race España	Contestant	2 episodes
2022	Tras la carrera	Eliminated contestant	1 episode

== Discography ==
=== Singles ===
Year	Title
2022	"Sácame a Pasear"
