= Onyx (drag queen) =

Spanish drag performer

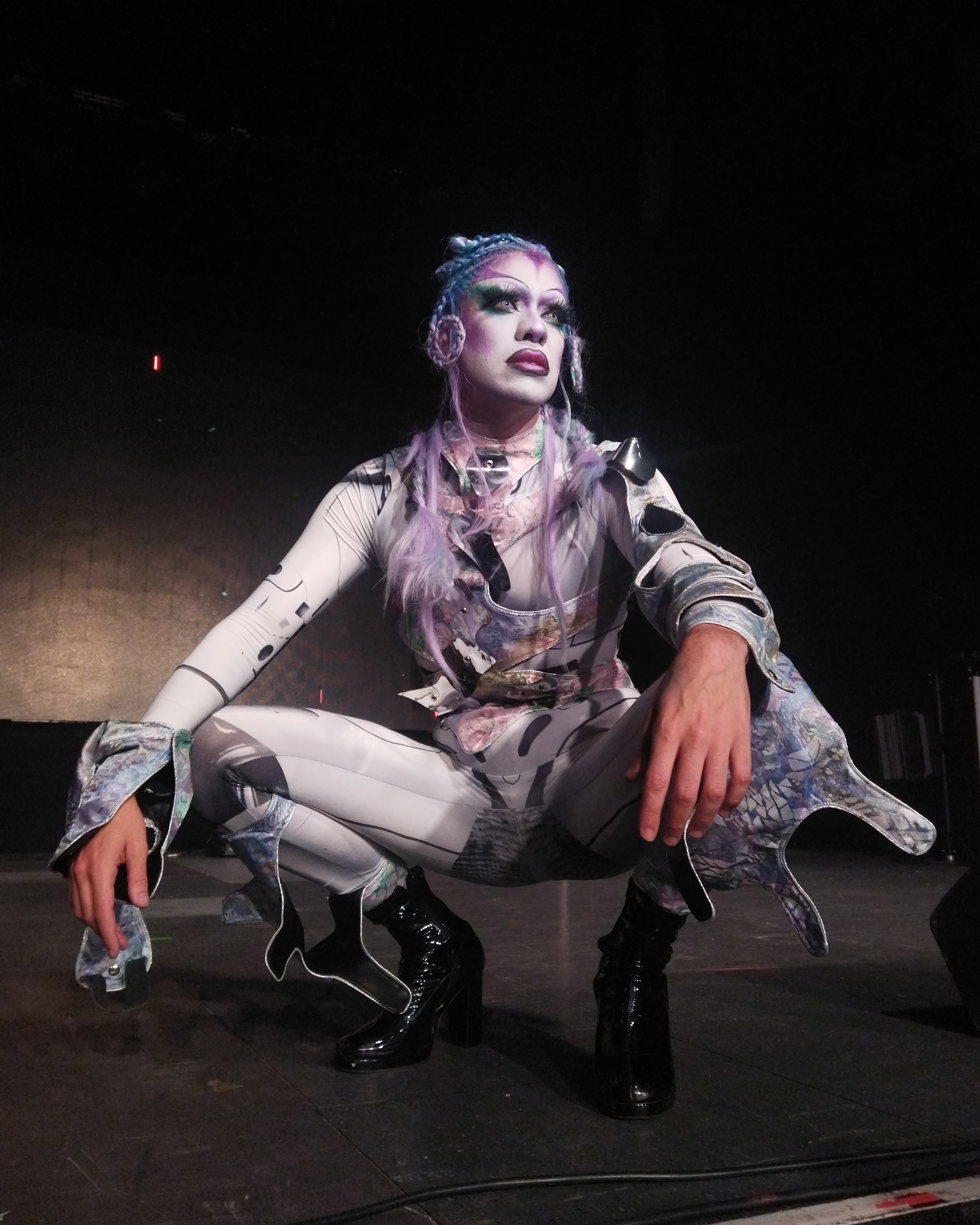
- Onyx Unleashed in 2024
- Born: Pablo Javier Garcia de Durango Caveda; Madrid, Spain
- Other names: Onyx Unleashed
- Occupation: Drag performer
- Television: Drag Race España (season 2)

Onyx Unleashed, formerly known simply as Onyx, is the stage name of Pablo Javier Garcia de Durango Caveda, a Spanish drag queen and multidisciplinary artist most known for competing on season 2 of Drag Race España and season 1 of Drag Race España All Stars.

== Career ==
Durango began to do drag as Onyx at a local festival in Madrid called El Puñal Dorao, which helped him start the process of deconstructing his gender expression and identity.

In 2022, Onyx joined the cast of season 2 of the reality television show Drag Race España, which began airing in March 2022. During the fourth episode, after the performance of "La Llamadrag," Onyx received critiques from the judges that placed her among the lowest-ranked queens that week. However Onyx was spared from being in the bottom two with Jota Carajota and Juriji der Klee lip syncing instead. In the fifth episode, her impersonation of Juana la Loca in Snatch Game was not to the judges' liking. This lead her to be in the bottom two, where she was ultimately eliminated after a defeat in a lip sync battle against Diamante Merrybrown.

Once season two ended, Onyx joined the cast of the national tour, Gran Hotel de las Reinas.

In May of the same year, she collaborated with Glamour for a makeup demonstration. In June, she appeared in the documentary Trabajar como DRAG QUEEN en España (Working as a Drag Queen in Spain), by LGBT rights activist Daniel Valero, about the personal stories of diverse drag artists, the political meaning of this type of artistic expression, and Spain's drag culture.

The website Collider included Onyx in its list of the 10 most unique drag queens in the Drag Race franchise.

== Filmography ==
=== Television ===
Year	Title	Role	Notes
2022	Drag Race España	Contestant	6 episodes
2023	Sí lo digo	Guest	2 episodes
