= Drag Race España All Stars =

Spanish reality competition television series

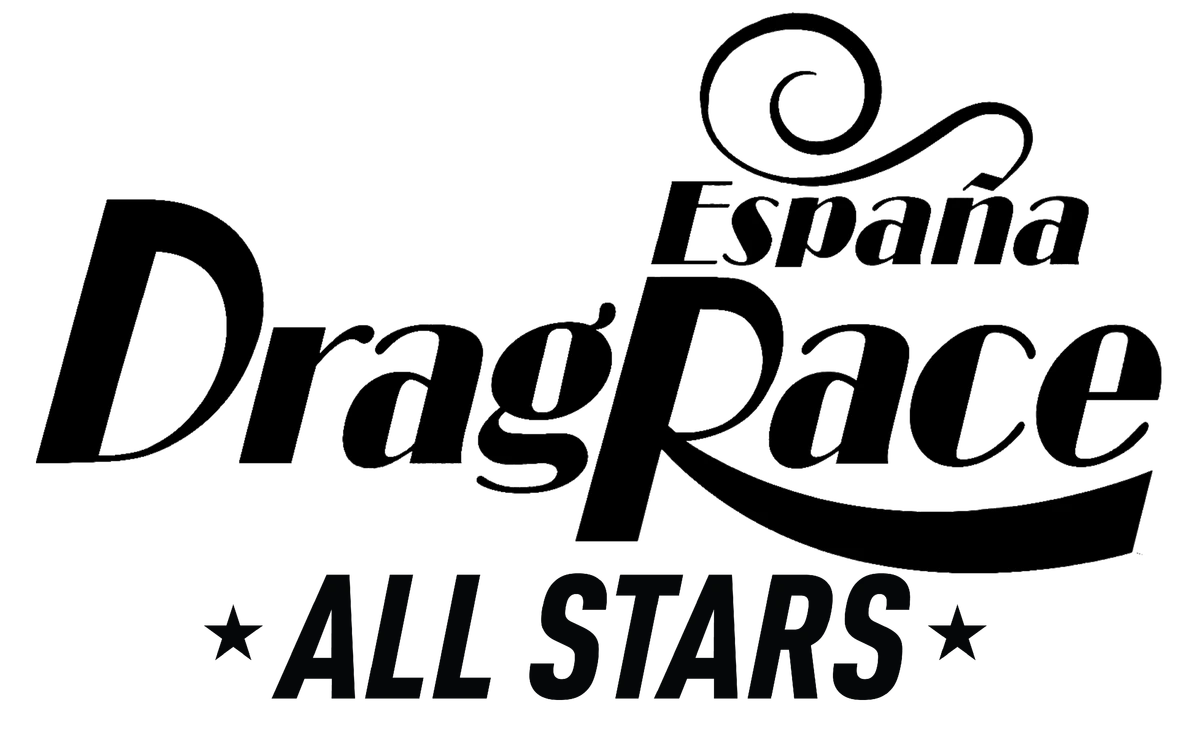
- Genre: Reality competition
- Presented by: Supremme de Luxe
- Judges: Supremme de Luxe; Ana Locking; Javier Ambrossi; Javier Calvo
- Country of origin: Spain
- Original language: Spanish
- No. of seasons: 1
- No. of episodes: 7

Production
- Camera setup: Multi-camera
- Production company: World of Wonder

Original release
- Network: Atresplayer (Spain); WOW Presents Plus (International)
- Release: 4 February 2024 – present

Related
- Drag Race España; RuPaul's Drag Race All Stars

Drag Race España All Stars is a Spanish reality competition series. It is a spin-off of Drag Race España and is based on the original American series, RuPaul's Drag Race All Stars. The series is being broadcast by Atresplayer in Spain, and on WOW Presents Plus internationally.

The series was renewed for a second season on 29 November 2025.

== Production ==
In September 2022, Drag Race España opened a casting call for its third season and also announced that a Spanish adaption of RuPaul's Drag Race All Stars was in the works. The All Stars edition premiered after the third season of Drag Race España.

Following RuPaul's Drag Race: UK vs. the World and Canada's Drag Race: Canada vs. the World, which brought together queens from across various international Drag Race versions to compete in a format similar to All Stars, Drag Race España All Stars is the first direct international adaptation of RuPaul's Drag Race All Stars, featuring returning competitors from a single international franchise.

In November 2023, World of Wonder and Atresmedia shared a teaser for the season, announcing that the cast would be revealed in January 2024.

In November of 2025, a second season was announced with filming in Spring of 2026.

== Format ==
The format for Drag Race España All Stars is similar to used between the second and the fourth seasons of RuPaul's Drag Race All Stars. There are two maxi challenge winners and two or more bottom queens, who would be up for elimination. The top two queens of the week's maxi challenge will Lip Sync for Their Legacy. The winner of the Lip Sync will have the power to eliminate one of the bottom two queens of the week. In the finale, the top 4 will participate in a Lip Sync For The Crown tournament to determine the winner of the season.

Judges on Drag Race España All Stars
Judge	Season
Judge	1
Supremme de Luxe	Main
Ana Locking	Main
Javier Ambrossi	Main
Javier Calvo	Main

== Contestants ==
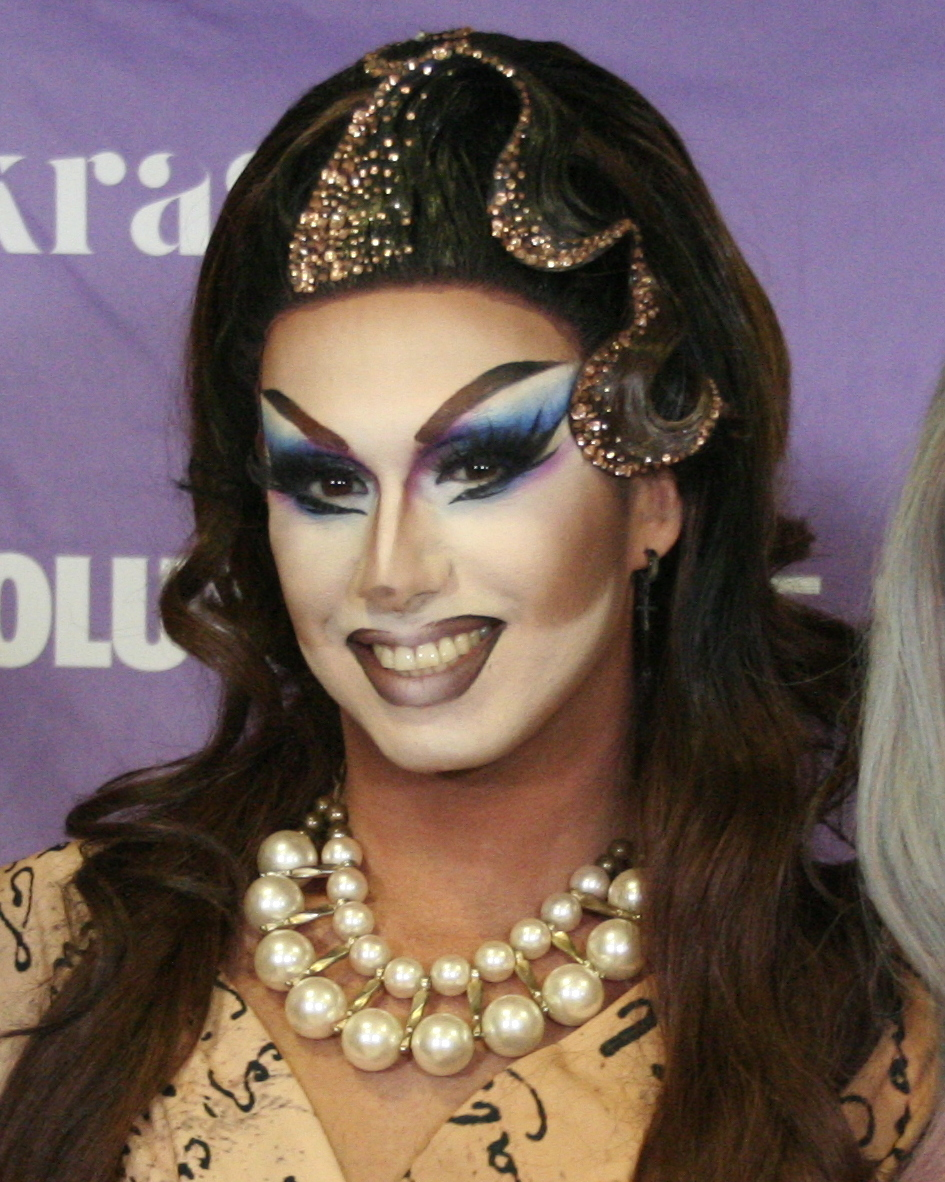
The winner, Drag Sethlas.

Ages, names, and cities stated are at time of filming.

Contestants of Drag Race España All Stars season 1 and their backgrounds
Contestant	Age	City	Original season	Original placement	Outcome
Drag Sethlas	31	Las Palmas, Canary Islands	Season 2	6th place	Winner
Samantha Ballentines	36	Cádiz, Andalusia	Season 2	10th place (Note: The contestant was voted Miss Congeniality on their original season.)	Runner-up (Note: Samantha Ballentines was voted Miss Congeniality by fellow contestants.)
Hornella Góngora	35	Alicante, Valencian Community	Season 3	3rd place	3rd place
Juriji der Klee	32	Brussels, Belgium	Season 2	5th place	3rd place
Pupi Poisson	41	Madrid, Community of Madrid	Season 1	4th place	5th place
Sagittaria	24	Barcelona, Catalonia	Season 1	Runner-up	6th place
Pakita	30	Seville, Andalusia	Season 3	7th place	7th place
Onyx Unleashed (Note: Now known as Onyx Unleashed, she is referred to as Onyx on season 2.)	34	Madrid, Community of Madrid	Season 2	8th place	8th place
Pink Chadora	38	Málaga, Andalusia	Season 3	7th place	9th place

== Contestants progress ==
Legend:

Drag Sethlas won Drag Race España All Stars.
Samantha Ballentines was the runner-up.
Samantha Ballentines was voted Miss Congeniality (Miss C) by fellow contestants.
Onyx Unleashed won Miss Lost Look (MLL) for having the best unaired look of the season.
WIN indicates that the contestant won the challenge and the Lip Sync for Your Legacy.
TOP2 indicates that the contestant won the challenge, but lost the Lip Sync for Your Legacy.
SAFE indicates that the contestant was declared safe by the judges.
LOW indicates that Hornella Góngora was in the bottom, but was saved by the eliminated contestants from being potentially sent home.
BTM (Bottom) indicates that the contestant was up for elimination.
ELIM (Eliminated) indicates that the contestant was eliminated.
Guest indicates that the contestant returned as a guest.

Contestants progress with placements in each episode
Contestant	Episode						
Contestant	1	2	3	4	5	6	7
Drag Sethlas	WIN	TOP2	WIN	SAFE	TOP2	Guest	Winner
Samantha Ballentines	SAFE	SAFE	SAFE	WIN	WIN	Miss C	Runner-up
Hornella Góngora	TOP2	SAFE	SAFE	BTM	LOW	Guest	Eliminated
Juriji der Klee	SAFE	SAFE	TOP2	TOP2	BTM	Guest	Eliminated
Pupi Poisson	SAFE	WIN	BTM	SAFE	ELIM	Guest	Guest
Sagittaria	SAFE	BTM	SAFE	ELIM	Guest	Guest	Guest
Pakita	SAFE	SAFE	ELIM		Guest	Guest	Guest
Onyx Unleashed	BTM	ELIM			Guest	MLL	Guest
Pink Chadora	ELIM				Guest	Guest	Guest

== Lip syncs ==
Legend:

The contestant was eliminated after their first time in the bottom.
The contestant was eliminated after their second time in the bottom.
The contestant won the first round of the Lip Sync Smackdown for the Crown and advanced to the second.
The contestant won the second round of the Lip Sync Smackdown for the Crown and was declared the winner of the season.

Episode	Top All Stars (Elimination)			Song	Winner	Bottom	Eliminated
1	Drag Sethlas (Pink Chadora)	vs.	Hornella Góngora (Onyx)	"Me gustas mucho" (Rocío Dúrcal)	Drag Sethlas	Onyx, Pink Chadora	Pink Chadora
2	Drag Sethlas (Sagittaria)	vs.	Pupi Poisson (Onyx)	"Nochentera" (Vicco)	Pupi Poisson	Onyx, Sagittaria	Onyx Unleashed
3	Drag Sethlas (Pakita)	vs.	Juriji der Klee (Pupi)	"Estoy llorando por ti" (K.U. Minerva)	Drag Sethlas	Pakita, Pupi	Pakita
4	Juriji der Klee (Sagittaria)	vs.	Samantha Ballentines (Sagittaria)	"Mafiosa" (Nathy Peluso)	Samantha Ballentines	Hornella, Sagittaria	Sagittaria
5	Drag Sethlas (Pupi)	vs.	Samantha Ballentines (Pupi)	"La zarzamora" (Lola Flores)	Samantha Ballentines	~~Hornella~~, (Note: Hornella Góngora was in the bottom three, but was preemptively saved from elimination by the eliminated queens.) Juriji, Pupi	Pupi Poisson
Episode	Final All Stars			Song	Winner		
7	Juriji der Klee	vs.	Samantha Ballentines	"Pop" (La Oreja de Van Gogh)	Samantha Ballentines		
7	Drag Sethlas	vs.	Hornella Góngora	"Yo no soy esa" (Rosa López)	Drag Sethlas		
7	Drag Sethlas	vs.	Samantha Ballentines	"Eloise" (Tino Casal)	Drag Sethlas		

== Guest judges ==
Listed in chronological order:

- Bárbara Rey, actress
- Silvia Abril, actress and comedian
- Laura Sánchez, model and actress
- Nathy Peluso, singer and songwriter
- Inés Hernand, television presenter and comedian

=== Special guests ===
Guests who appeared in episodes, but did not judge on the main stage.

Episode 2

- Yola Berrocal, media personality
- Yurena, singer and television personality

Episode 4

- Carlos Marco, singer and music producer
- Tamy Nsue, singer and actress
- Carmelo Segura, choreographer

Episode 6

- Carmen Farala, winner of Drag Race España season 1
- Sharonne, winner of Drag Race España season 2
- Pitita, winner of Drag Race España season 3

== Episodes ==
No. overall	No. in season	Title	Original release date
1	1	"Supremme Eleganza Olé Stars Extravaganza"	4 February 2024
Nine queens from the first three seasons of Drag Race España enter the workroom. For the first mini-challenge, the queens read each other to filth. Pupi Poisson wins the mini-challenge. For the main challenge, the queens perform in the Supremme Eleganza Olé Stars Extravaganza talent show. The queens' acts are as follows: Drag Sethlas - Lip-syncing and acrobatics; Hornella Góngora - Live singing and vedette performance; Juriji der Klee - Live singing; Onyx Unleashed - Lip-syncing; Pakita - Lip-syncing and aerial silk performance; Pink Chadora - Comedic lip-syncing; Pupi Poisson - Live singing; Sagittaria - Lip-syncing and acrobatics; Samantha Ballentines - Comedic storytelling; Drag Sethlas, Hornella Góngora and Samantha Ballentines receive positive critiques, with Drag Sethlas and Hornella Góngora as the top two. Onyx Unleashed, Pink Chadora and Pupi Poisson receive negative critiques, with Onyx Unleashed and Pink Chadora as the bottom two. Drag Sethlas and Hornella Góngora lip-sync to "Me gustas mucho" by Rocío Dúrcal. Drag Sethlas wins the lip-sync and eliminates Pink Chadora from the competition.: Guest Judge: Bárbara Rey; Mini Challenge: Reading is Fundamental; Mini Challenge Winner: Pupi Poisson; Main Challenge: Perform in the Supremme Eleganza Olé Stars Extravaganza talent show; Top Two: Drag Sethlas and Hornella Góngora; Challenge Prize: A two-night stay in Torremolinos; Lip-Sync Song: "Me gustas mucho" by Rocío Dúrcal; Lip-Sync for Your Legacy Winner: Drag Sethlas; Bottom Two: Onyx Unleashed and Pink Chadora; Eliminated: Pink Chadora; Farewell Message: "BONITURAS, ¡HASTA SIEMPRE! ¡DIVERTÍOS! - Pink Chadora ∞" ("GIRLS, GOODBYE FOR NOW! HAVE FUN! - Pink Chadora ∞"")
2	2	"Snatch Game"	11 February 2024
The queens return to the workroom and Hornella Góngora reveals that she chose to eliminate Onyx Unleashed had she won the lip-sync. For the week's main challenge, the queens play the Snatch Game. The cast consisted of: Drag Sethlas as Aless Gibaja; Hornella Góngora as José Luis Moreno; Juriji Der Klee as Aramis Fuster; Onyx Unleashed as Lorenzo Caprile; Pakita as Carmen de Mairena; Pupi Poisson as Tamara Falcó; Sagittaria as Rosario Flores; Samantha Ballentines as Raphael; On the runway, category is Redención (Redemption). Drag Sethlas, Pupi Poisson and Samantha Ballentines receive positive critiques, with Drag Sethlas and Pupi Poisson as the top two. Hornella Góngora, Onyx Unleashed and Sagittaria receive negative critiques, with Onyx Unleashed and Sagittaria as the bottom two. Drag Sethlas and Pupi Poisson lip-sync to "Nochentera" by Vicco. Pupi Poisson wins the lip-sync and eliminates Onyx Unleashed from the competition.: Guest Judge: Silvia Abril; Main Challenge: Snatch Game; Runway Theme: Redención (Redemption); Top Two: Drag Sethlas and Pupi Poisson; Challenge Prize: A facial skin care set valued at €1,500; Lip-Sync Song: "Nochentera" by Vicco; Lip-Sync for Your Legacy Winner: Pupi Poisson; Bottom Two: Onyx Unleashed and Sagittaria; Eliminated: Onyx Unleashed; Farewell Message: "El mejor mensaje de espejo del mundo. #TEAMSETHLAS - ONYX UNLEASHED" ("The best mirror message in the world. #TEAMSETHLAS - ONYX UNLEASHED")
3	3	"The Ball: Heaven, Hell, and Capital Sins"	18 February 2024
The queens return to the workroom and Drag Sethlas reveals that she chose to eliminate Sagittaria had she won the lip-sync. For the week's main challenge, the queens walk in the deadly sins ball with the categories Cielo (Heaven), Infierno (Hell), and Pecados Capitales (Deadly Sins). The queens are each assigned a sin for the third category and must make their look from scratch. Drag Sethlas, Juriji der Klee and Sagittaria receive positive critiques, with Drag Sethlas and Juriji der Klee as the top two. Pakita and Pupi Poisson receive negative critiques and are the bottom two. Drag Sethlas and Juriji der Klee lip-sync to "Estoy llorando por ti" by K.U. Minerva). Drag Sethlas wins the lip-sync and eliminates Pakita from the competition.: Guest Judge: Laura Sánchez; Main Challenge: Walk the Deadly Sins Ball; Runway Themes: Cielo (Heaven), Infierno (Hell), and Pecados Capitales (Deadly Sins); Top Two: Drag Sethlas and Juriji der Klee; Challenge Prize: A jewelry set from Aster Lab; Lip-Sync Song: "Estoy llorando por ti" by K.U. Minerva); Lip-Sync for Your Legacy Winner: Drag Sethlas; Bottom Two: Pakita and Pupi Poisson; Eliminated: Pakita; Farewell Message: "¡Que pena que el concurso empiece justo cuando me voy! Lucha Hornella!!! -PKT" ("What a shame the competition’s starting just as I’m leaving! Go Hornella!!! -PKT"")
4	4	"Girl Bands Battle"	25 February 2024
The queens return to the workroom and Juriji der Klee reveals that she chose to eliminate Pupi Poisson had she won the lip-sync. For the week's main challenge, the queens write, record, and perform verses as two girl groups for the song "Superstar". The groups are: Ovah Girls: Drag Sethlas, Juriji der Klee and Samantha Ballentines; 3HC: Hornella Góngora, Pupi Poisson and Sagittaria; On the runway, category is Strass: Divina de la Muerte (Strass: Divine of Death). The Ovah Girls are declared the winning team, with Juriji der Klee and Samantha Ballentines as the top two. 3HC is the losing team, with Hornella Góngora and Sagittaria as the bottom two. Juriji der Klee and Samantha Ballentines lip-sync to "Mafiosa" by Nathy Peluso. Samantha Ballentines wins the lip-sync and eliminates Sagittaria from the competition.: Guest Judge: Nathy Peluso; Main Challenge: Write, record, and perform verses as two girl groups; Runway Theme: Strass: Divina de la Muerte (Strass: Divine of Death); Top Two: Juriji der Klee and Samantha Ballentines; Challenge Prize: A set of Krash Kosmetics makeup products valued at €500; Lip-Sync Song: "Mafiosa" by Nathy Peluso; Lip-Sync for Your Legacy Winner: Samantha Ballentines; Bottom Two: Hornella Góngora and Sagittaria; Eliminated: Sagittaria; Farewell Message: "Happy barry tu yu, ahora esto lo limpias tú. Os amo, #teampupiporsiempre." ("Happy Birthday to You, noww you're the one who's cleaning this up. I love you all, #TeamPupiForever.")
5	5	"The Hairdresser's Salon"	3 March 2024
The queens return to the workroom and Juriji der Klee reveals that she chose to eliminate Pupi Poisson had she won the lip-sync. For the week's main challenge, the queens write and deliver a roast of the judges panel and their fellow contestants. On the runway, category is Martirizadas (Martir-ised). Drag Sethlas and Samantha Ballentines receive positive critiques and are the top two. The three remaining queens are all in the bottom. The four eliminated queens, who were in the audience for the roast, have the ability to vote to save one of the bottom three in the event they are chosen for elimination. The eliminated queens vote to save Hornella Góngora. Drag Sethlas and Samantha Ballentines lip-sync to "La zarzamora" by Lola Flores. Samantha Ballentines wins the lip-sync and eliminates Pupi Poisson from the competition.: Guest Judge: Inés Hernand; Main Challenge: Perform a roast of the judges panel and fellow contestants; Runway Theme: Martirizadas (Martir-ised); Top Two: Drag Sethlas and Samantha Ballentines; Challenge Prize: A surprise European trip from Waynabox; Lip-Sync Song: "La zarzamora" by Lola Flores; Lip-Sync for Your Legacy Winner: Samantha Ballentines; Bottom Three: Hornella Góngora, Juriji der Klee, and Pupi Poisson; Eliminated: Pupi Poisson; Farewell Message: TBA
6	6	"The Reunion"	10 March 2024
The queens return to revisit the season. Through a group vote Onyx Unleashed is awarded Miss Lost Look for having the best unaired look and Samantha Ballentines is awarded Miss Congeniality.: Miss Lost Look: Onyx Unleashed; Miss Congeniality: Samantha Ballentines
7	7	"Grand Finale"	17 March 2024
The queens return to the workroom and Drag Sethlas reveals that she chose to eliminate Pupi Poisson had she won the lip-sync. For the final week there is no competitive challenge but the season's contestants perform a revue alongside the judging panel (all in drag). After the revue performance and critiques Supremme announces that the queens will take part in a lip-sync smackdown for the crown. The first lip-sync is between Juriji der Klee vs. Samantha Ballentines. They lip-sync to "Pop" by La Oreja de Van Gogh. Samantha Ballentines wins the lip-sync and Juriji der Klee is eliminated. The second lip-sync is between Drag Sethlas vs. Hornella Góngora. They lip-sync to "Yo no soy esa" by Rosa López. Drag Sethlas wins the lip-sync and Hornella Góngora is eliminated. Prior to the final round, the season's contestants walk the runway a final time and the category is Olé Stars Eleganza. The final lip-sync is between Drag Sethlas vs. Samantha Ballentines. They lip-sync to "Eloise" by Tino Casal. It is announced that Drag Sethlas is the winner, leaving Samantha Ballentines as the runner-up.: Runway Theme: Olé Stars Eleganza; Final Four: Drag Sethlas, Hornella Góngora, Juriji der Klee and Samantha Ballentines; Lip-Sync Smackdown #1: Juriji der Klee vs. Samantha Ballentines; Lip-Sync Song: "Pop" by La Oreja de Van Gogh; Eliminated: Juriji der Klee; Lip-Sync Smackdown #2: Drag Sethlas vs. Hornella Góngora; Lip-Sync Song: "Yo no soy esa" by Rosa López; Eliminated: Hornella Góngora; Lip-Sync Smackdown #3: Drag Sethlas vs. Samantha Ballentines; Lip-Sync Song: "Eloise" by Tino Casal; Runner-up: Samantha Ballentines; Winner of Drag Race España All Stars Season One: Drag Sethlas
