= Samantha Ballentines =

Spanish drag performer

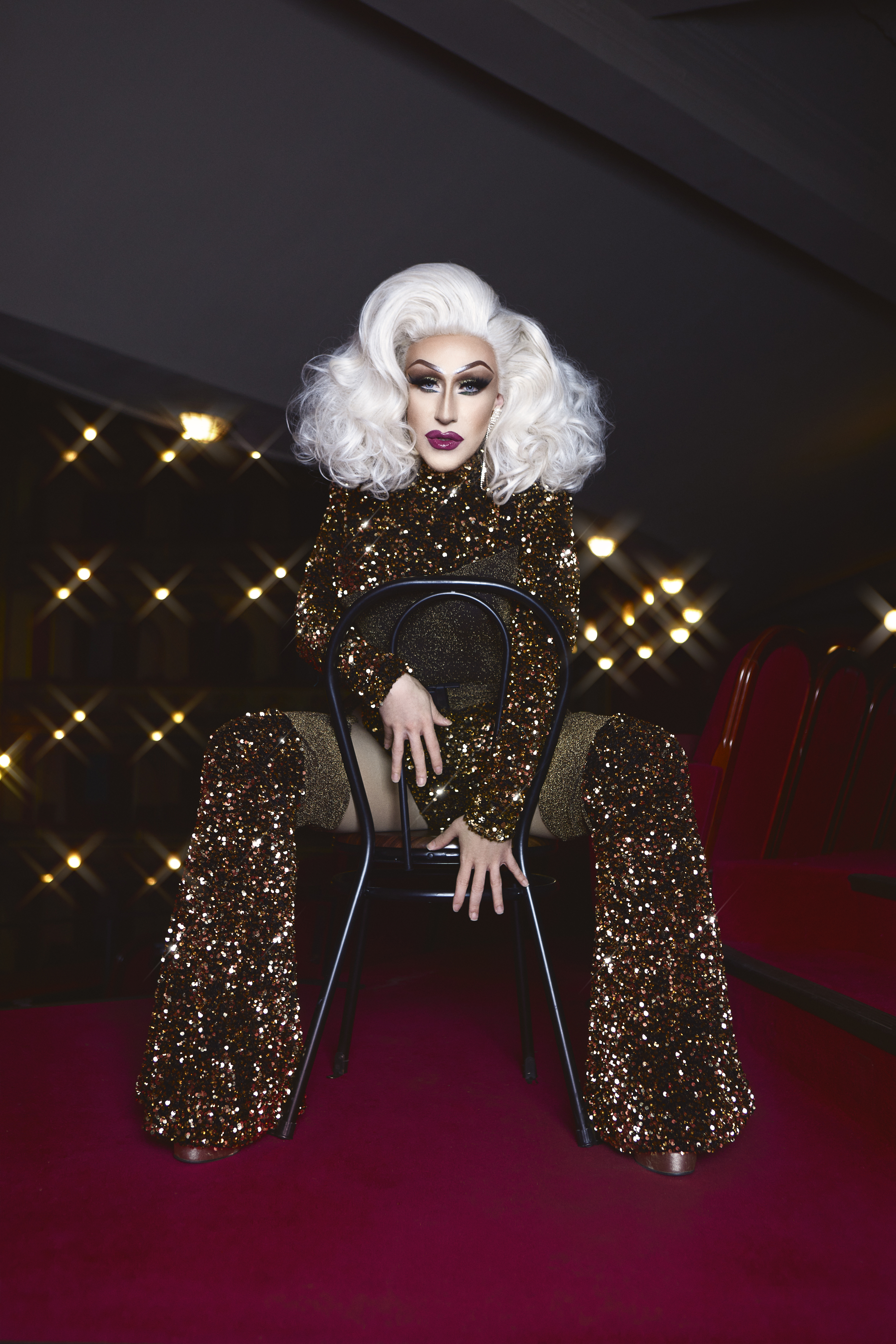
- Born: Francisco José Sánchez Jiménez; July 13, 1986 (age 39); Cádiz, Andalusia, Spain
- Occupation: Drag performer
- Television: Drag Race España (season 2)

Samantha Ballentines is the stage name of Francisco José Sánchez Jiménez (born July 13, 1986), a Spanish drag queen, comedian, and multidisciplinary artist most known for competing on season 2 of Drag Race España and season 1 of Drag Race España All Stars.

== Career ==
In December 2014, she performed in a drag show with Juana Sicosis.

In 2022, Samantha joined the cast of season 2 of the reality television show Drag Race España, which began airing in March 2022. In the first episode, she was one of the two queens up for elimination, which led to her facing off in a lip sync battle against fellow contestant Marisa Prisa. Samantha Ballentines won the lip sync and Marisa Prisa became the season's first eliminated queen. In the second episode, she was again up for elimination, but she maintained her position in the competition by beating Ariel Rec in another lip sync battle. Samantha was eliminated in the third episode, after being defeated in the lip sync battle by Jota Carajota. After her elimination, she was crowned Miss Congeniality and received a prize of 3,000 euros. Her time on the show, as much as her lip sync performances, made her a controversial figure on social media among the show's fans.

Once the season ended, Samantha went on to join the national tour, Gran Hotel de las Reinas. She later publicly criticized the fact that no local government in the Province of Cádiz had offered to accept said tour, despite it having drag artists from Jerez de la Frontera and San Fernando.

In December 2022, she headlined the poster, along with Marina, for the Sala Razzmatazz party Una fantasía in Barcelona.

== Filmography ==
=== Television ===
Year	Title	Role	Notes
2022	Drag Race España	Contestant	4 episodes
2022	Tras la carrera	Eliminated contestant	1 episode
2023	Sí lo digo	Host	5 episodes
2024	Drag Race España All Stars	Contestant	7 episodes
