= Choriza May =

Spanish-British drag queen

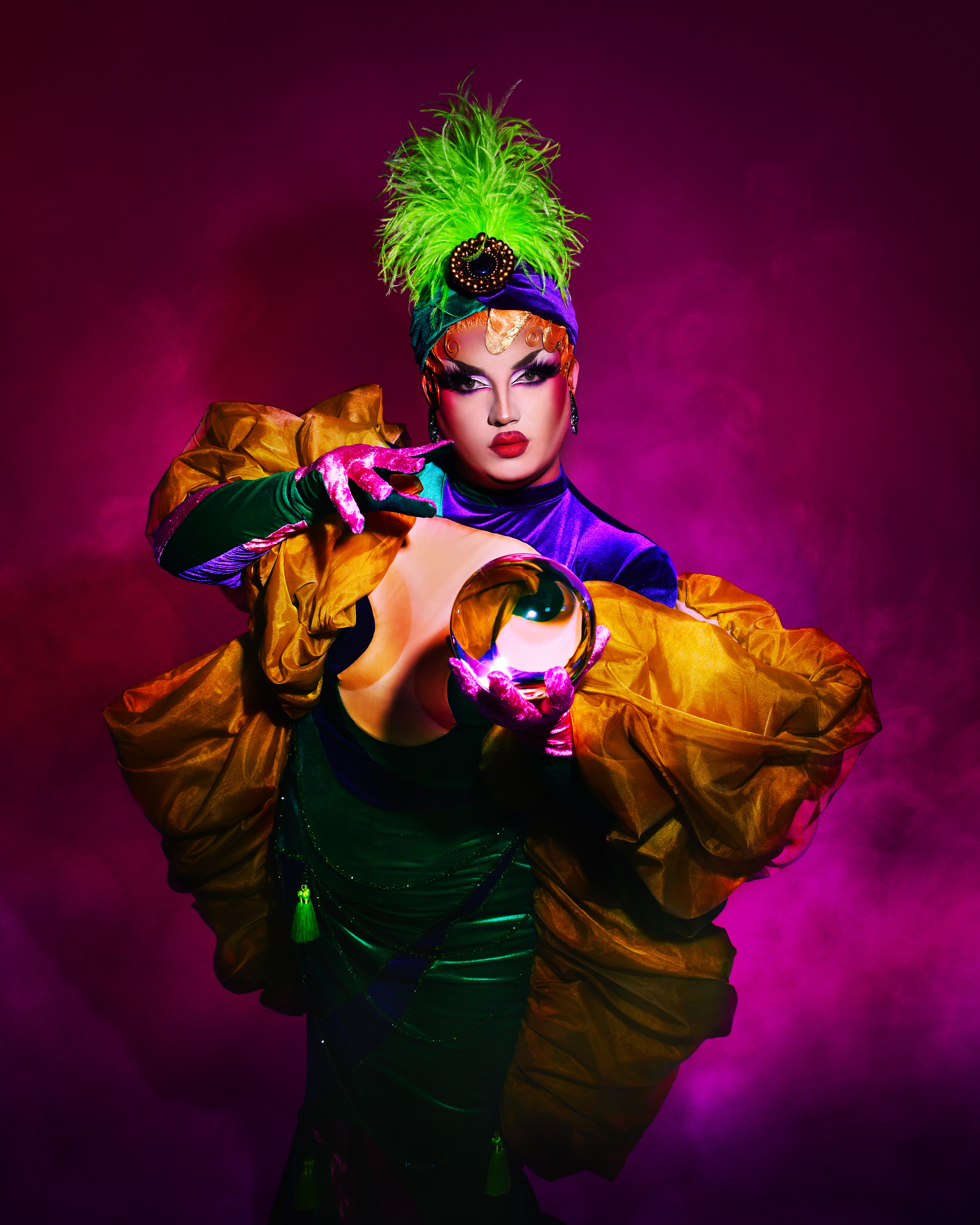
- Choriza May in 2023
- Born: Adrian Martín Esteve; Guadassuar, Valencia, Spain
- Television: RuPaul's Drag Race UK (series 3); RuPaul's Drag Race: UK vs. the World (series 2)
- Website: chorizamay.com

Adrian Martín Esteve, known professionally as Choriza May, is a Spanish-British drag performer, graphic designer, and illustrator. He is most known for competing on series 3 of RuPaul's Drag Race UK and the second series of RuPaul's Drag Race: UK vs. the World.

== Career ==
In 2019, Choriza May entered Drag Idol Newcastle, one of the UK's largest drag competitions. After reaching the final, Choriza was declared the winner, beating out fellow finalists Pebble Dash and Chanel Marie. May went on to perform on Northern Pride's main stage. She competed on series 3 of RuPaul's Drag Race UK. Following the cast announcement, some Drag Race fans questioned why she did not compete on Drag Race España instead. On season 3, Choriza made it to the Snatch Game and was part of a double elimination alongside River Medway. May placed 6th/7th overall. She was later a guest judge on the second season of Drag Race España.

In 2023, May was announced as a member of the judges panel for Drag Idol UK, hosted at Bobby's, Newcastle.

In 2024, Choriza May appeared on the second series of RuPaul's Drag Race: UK vs. the World, placing sixth out of eleven queens after being eliminated by Marina Summers.

She currently co-hosts Que Nos Pillen Confesadas, a Spanish-language podcast, alongside Arantxa Castilla-La Mancha.

== Personal life ==
Choriza May is originally from Guadassuar, València and lives in Newcastle, United Kingdom. She has British citizenship.

Outside of drag, he is an illustrator and has had his work featured in HBO's We're Here, and has designed packaging for the wig company "Wigs and Grace". He also illustrated for FABULOUS with Louie & Charlie, written by John Jeffords and Lynzle Rogers.

== Filmography ==
- RuPaul's Drag Race UK (series 3, 2021)
- Drag Race España (season 2, 2022)
- RuPaul's Drag Race: UK vs. the World (series 2, 2024)
- Bring Back My Girls (2024)

== Discography ==
=== Extended plays ===
- "Party In Hell" (2024)

=== Singles ===
- "My Pussy is Like a Peach" (2021)
- "My Pussy is Like a Peach (Christmas Remix)" (feat. Manila Luzon) (2021)
- "Feeling Fruity" (feat. River Medway) (2022)
- "Pollo Frito" (feat. Diamante Merybrown) (2022)
- "Maricón" (feat. Estrella Xtravaganza) (2022)
- "Cho Cho Choriza May" (2023)
- "El Bolero De Guadassuar" (2023)
- "Mango Loco" (2023)
- "Eat That Ass" (2024)
- "Don Diabla" (2024)
- "Burn a Little Brighter" (2024)

=== Featured singles ===
- "B.D.E. (Big Drag Energy)" (with the cast of RuPaul's Drag Race UK series 3) (2021)

== Awards and nominations ==
| Year | Award-giving body | Category | Work | Results | Ref. |
|---|---|---|---|---|---|
| 2022 | The Queerties | Future All-Star | Herself | Nominated | |
