= Drag Sethlas =

Spanish drag performer

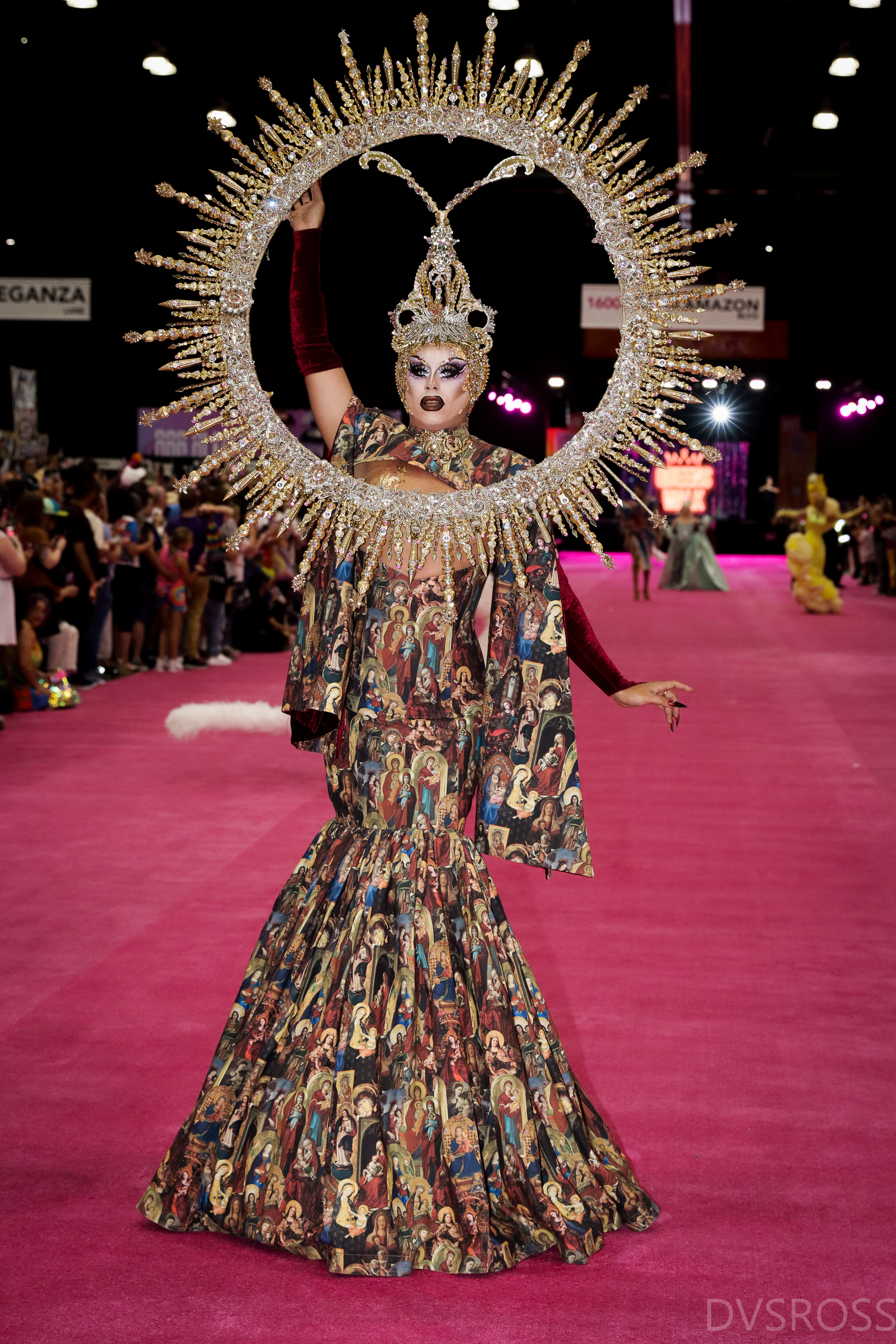
- Drag Sethlas at RuPaul's DragCon LA in 2024
- Born: Borja Casillas Toledo; Las Palmas, Canary Islands, Spain
- Education: University of Las Palmas (BA)
- Occupation(s): Drag performer, dancer, teacher
- Television: Drag Race España (season 2) Drag Race España All Stars (season 1 winner)

Borja Casillas Toledo, known professionally as Drag Sethlas, is a Spanish drag performer from Las Palmas, Canary Islands, Spain, known for competing on season 2 of Drag Race España (2022) and winning season 1 of Drag Race España All Stars (2024), as well as winning the Drag Queen Gala at the Carnival of Las Palmas, both in 2017 and 2020, respectively.

== Early life and education ==
Borja Casillas Toledo attended the University of Las Palmas de Gran Canaria, where he received a degree in Early Childhood Education. He has been a dancer since a very young age.

== Career ==
In 2017, Sethlas won the nineteenth Drag Queen Gala of the Carnival of Las Palmas de Canaria, with the concept ¡Mi cielo! Yo no hago milagros. Que sea lo que Dios quiera. (Darlings! I don't make miracles. Whatever God wills, will be), designed by Nelson Rodríguez. In 2020, he returned to win the twenty-third edition of said gala. In 2022, he participated in the second iteration of Drag Race España, where he ultimately placed 6th. He then returned in 2024 for Drag Race España All Stars, where he became the winner of the season. Winning 4 out of 5 competitive episodes, 3 of which all in a row, Sethlas has the award of having the best track record of any Drag Race queen from any franchise.

In 2017, Sethlas was sued by the Association of Christian Attorneys (ACA) for using religious symbols in his performance at the Carnival of Las Palmas Drag Queen Gala. Furthermore, the video of Sethlas' performance was removed from the RTVE web page because it "might harm people's sensibilities." The president of the Island Council of Tenerife, Carlos Alonso, branded the performance as "offensive," adding that "in the Drag Queen Gala of the Carnival of Las Palmas, in that headlining moment, there was no Carnival nor freedom, only offense." Monsignor Francisco Cases Andreu, bishop of the Roman Catholic Diocese of Canarias (Las Palmas Province), compared the drag queen's performance with the Spainair Flight 5022 accident, affirming that the former was making him "live the saddest day" of his stay in the Canary Islands. As a result of these declarations, the bishop had to ask forgiveness from the victims' families. The president of the Islamic Federation of the Canary Islands, Tijani El Bouji, also spoke out against the performance, which he called "blasphemous."

Borja Casillas faced two lawsuits accusing him of wounding religious sensibilities, one of which was dismissed by grand jury number 8 of Las Palmas, given that "a party like the Carnival allows us to rule out a deliberate intent to offend". Afterwards, the ACA requested an appeal of the dismissal, which was admitted for processing. Finally, the case was definitively archived upon finding that there was no offense to religious sentiments because the party is traditionally about being transgressive. The ACA was forced to pay the costs of the trial.

In 2025, Drag Sethlas appeared in the miniseries Superstar portraying Paco España.

== Filmography ==
Year	Contest	Allegory	Place
2016	Drag Queen Gala of the Carnival of Las Palmas de Canaria	El tamaño si importa (Size does matter)	First runner-up
2017	Drag Queen Gala of the Carnival of Las Palmas de Canaria	¡Mi cielo! Yo no hago milagros. Que sea lo que Dios quiera. (Darlings! I don't make miracles. Whatever God wills, will be)	Winner
2020	Drag Queen Gala of the Carnival of Las Palmas de Canaria	Si la tentación es hermosa, imagínate el pecado (If temptation is beautiful, imagine sin)	Winner
2022	Drag Race España (Season 2)	-	6th
2024	Drag Race España All Stars (Season 1)	-	Winner
