= Venedita Von Däsh =

Spanish drag performer (born 1992)

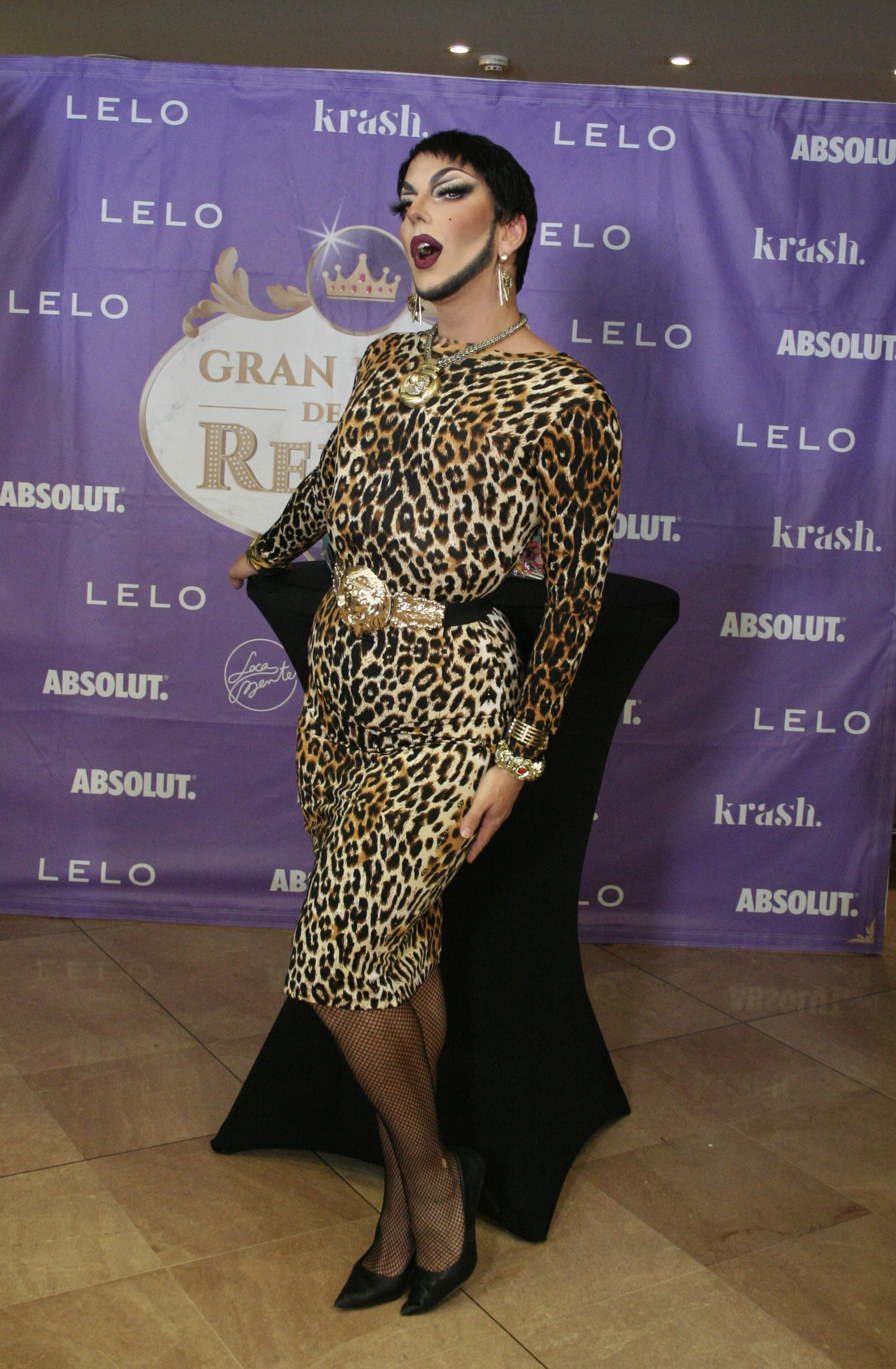
- Venedita Von Däsh in 2022
- Born: Borja Lisón; June 30, 1992 (age 34); Alicante, Spain
- Occupation: Drag performer
- Television: Drag Race España (season 2)

Venedita Von Däsh is the stage name of Borja Lisón (born June 30, 1992), a Spanish drag performer who competed on season 2 of Drag Race España.

== Career ==
In February 2021, Venedita Von Däsh appeared in the music video for "Dulce and Bautizada" by Samantha Hudson. In August of the same year, she provided a makeup tutorial in collaboration with Cosmopolitan.

In 2022, Venedita Von Däsh joined the second season of reality television series Drag Race España, which began airing in March 2022. She impersonated Miguel Bosé for the Snatch Game challenge. In the sixth episode, she portrayed Spanish aristocrat Carmen Polo, wife of dictator Francisco Franco, on the runway. She was ultimately one of the season's finalists, along with Estrella Xtravaganza, although Sharonne ultimately won the season.

After the season aired, Venedita went on to be part of the national tour, Gran Hotel de las Reinas. In October that year, she collaborated with fellow drag queen Sharonne for the newspaper El País' food section, "El Comidista". In 2023, she gave the closing speech at the Eleche at the LGBTI+ Diversa cultural festival alongside singer Luna Ki.

== Filmography ==
=== Television ===
- Drag Race España (season 2)

== Discography ==
=== Singles ===
Year	Title
2022	«Llévame al Cielo» with Supremme de Luxe, Marina, Estrella Xtravaganza, and Sharonne
