= Jota Carajota =

Spanish drag queen

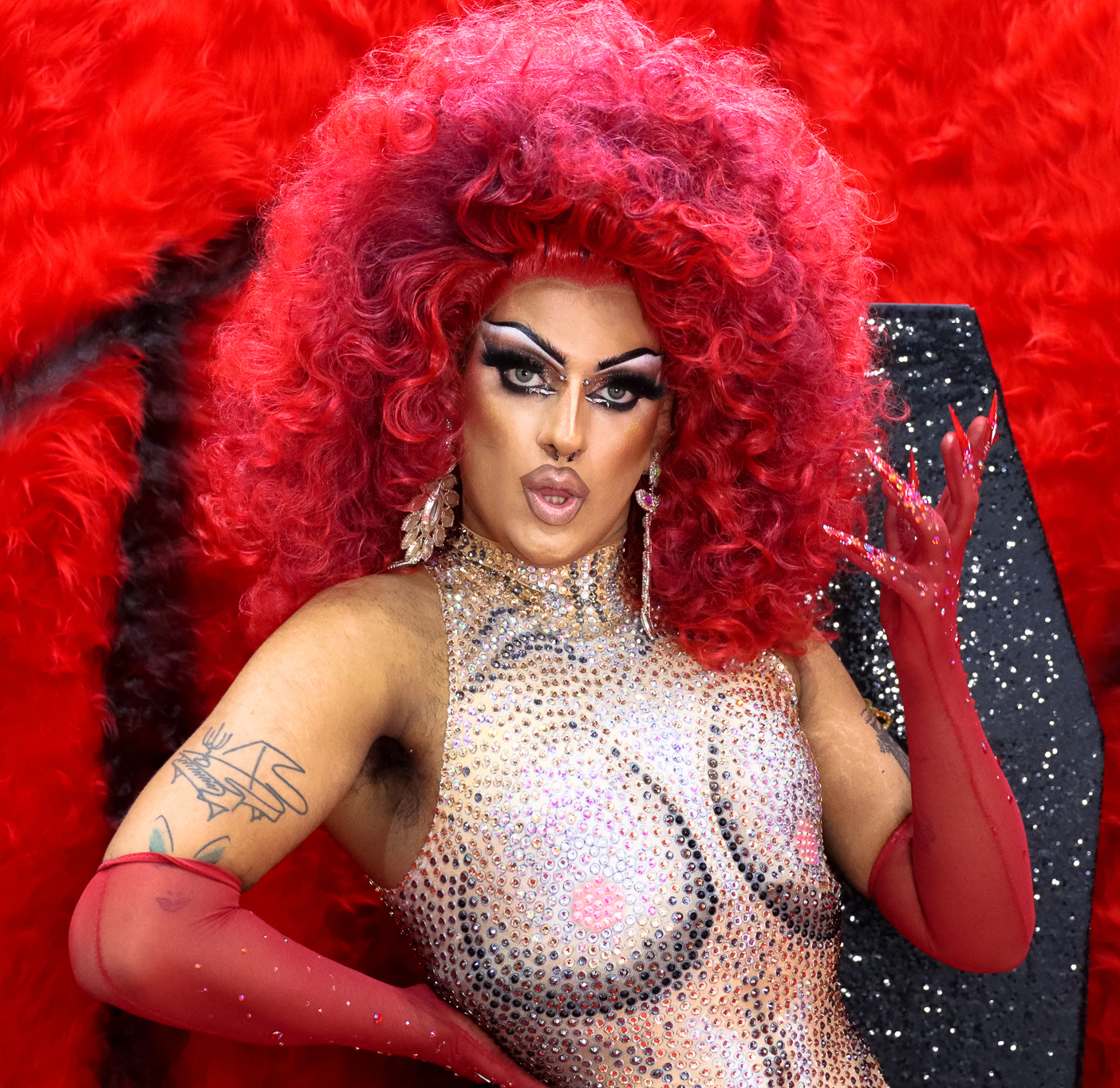
- Jota Carajota at RuPaul's DragCon LA, 2023
- Born: Juan José Torres Gutierrez; 2002 (age 23–24); Jerez de la Frontera, Cádiz, Andalusia, Spain
- Occupation: Drag queen

Jota Carajota is the stage name of Juan José Torres Gutierrez (born 2002), a Spanish drag queen who competed on the second season of Drag Race España.

== Early life ==
Jota Carajota was born in Jerez de la Frontera in December 2002, and in 2020 she moved to Malasaña, Madrid.

== Career ==
Jota Carajota founded the rock music group Queens Yeyés and helped organize a drag festival.

In 2022, Jota Carajota competed on the second season of Drag Race España. She was the fourth to be eliminated, when she was defeated in a lip sync battle by fellow contestant Juriji der Klee to the song "Baloncesto" by drag artist La Prohibida. She was the youngest contestant of the Drag Race franchise to date.

On February 17, 2023, she released the video clip "Te voy a abandonar" with La Prohibida. In May 2023, she was interviewed on the Gitanos podcast, presented by Joaquín López Bustamante and Manuel Moraga .

== Personal life ==
Jota Carajota has said, "No one is more diverse than me: I am a gypsy, bisexual, trans-non-binary, Martian drag queen and folkloric person."
