= Juriji der Klee =

Spanish drag performer (born 1990)

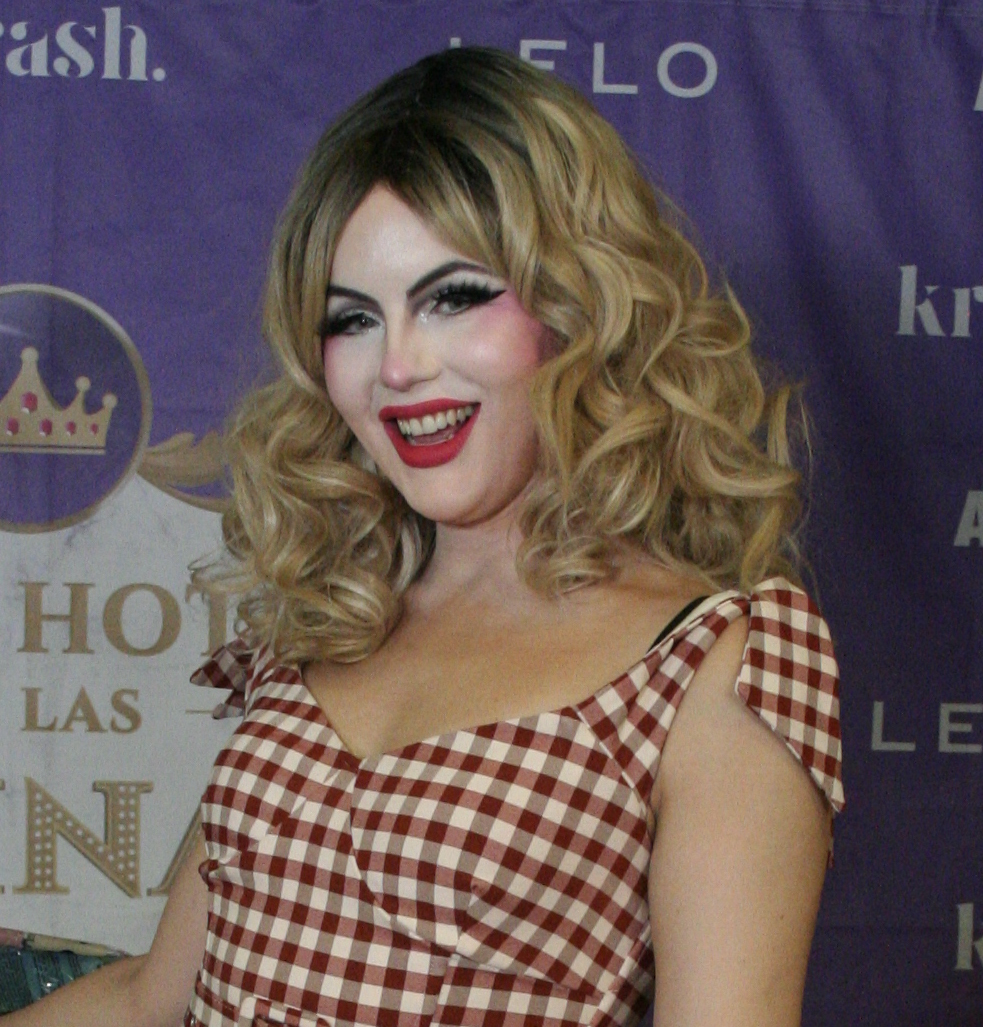
- Juriji der Klee in 2022
- Born: August 8, 1990 (age 35); Madrid, Spain
- Other name: Julia Carmen Rivet Jiménez
- Occupations: Theater artist; singer; drag queen
- Television: Drag Race España (season 2)
- Website: https://www.juriji.com/

Juriji der Klee (Madrid, August 8, 1990) is the stage name of Julia Carmen Rivet Jiménez, a Spanish-Belgian performance artist, singer, and drag queen known for competing on season 2 of Drag Race España and season 1 of Drag Race España All Stars, as well as being part of the Madame Arthur drag cabaret in Paris.

== Early life ==
She was born in Madrid and relocated to Brussels at age 5, although she maintained contact with her family in Spain and traveled often between the two countries. In an interview for KET, she affirmed that she created the name Juriji at age 13, when she used it to make an email address. At age 18, she started to train as a singer, specifically a countertenor. She started drag at the same age.

== Career ==
For a time, she performed as a singer at fashion shows in Paris and Brussels, working at events that mixed performance art and music. She worked with designers like Jean-Paul Lespagnard and Louise Leconte. In 2013, she was invited to perform at Centre Pompidou; this same year, she released her album Broken. In the middle of 2018, she joined the Madame Arthur cabaret, a well-known cabaret in the 18th arrondissement of Paris that was founded in 1946.

In 2022, she competed on season 2 of Drag Race España. After the show, she went on to join the cast of El Gran Hotel de las Reinas.

In a 2020 interview, Juriji stated that she was first attracted to the aesthetic of the castrati, who she considers "the first drag performers of their era, surrounded by feathers, makeup, wigs, and corsets." In a 2013 interview with Dazed, she said draws the majority of her references from the 1980s, "I have always been inspired by artists with a strong aesthetic like Nina Hagen, Klaus Nomi, Madonna, and David Bowie." In the same interview, she defined her music style as "a mix of elegant, baroque melodies and electronic music beats."

== Personal life ==
As of 2022, she was based in Brussels.

== Discography ==
=== Albums ===
- 2013: Broken

=== Singles ===
- 2022: XIXI

== Filmography ==
=== Television ===
- Drag Race España (season 2, contestant)
- Drag Race Belgique (season 1, special guest)
- Vestidas de azul
- Drag Race España All Stars (season 1, contestant)
