= Estrella Xtravaganza =

Spanish drag performer

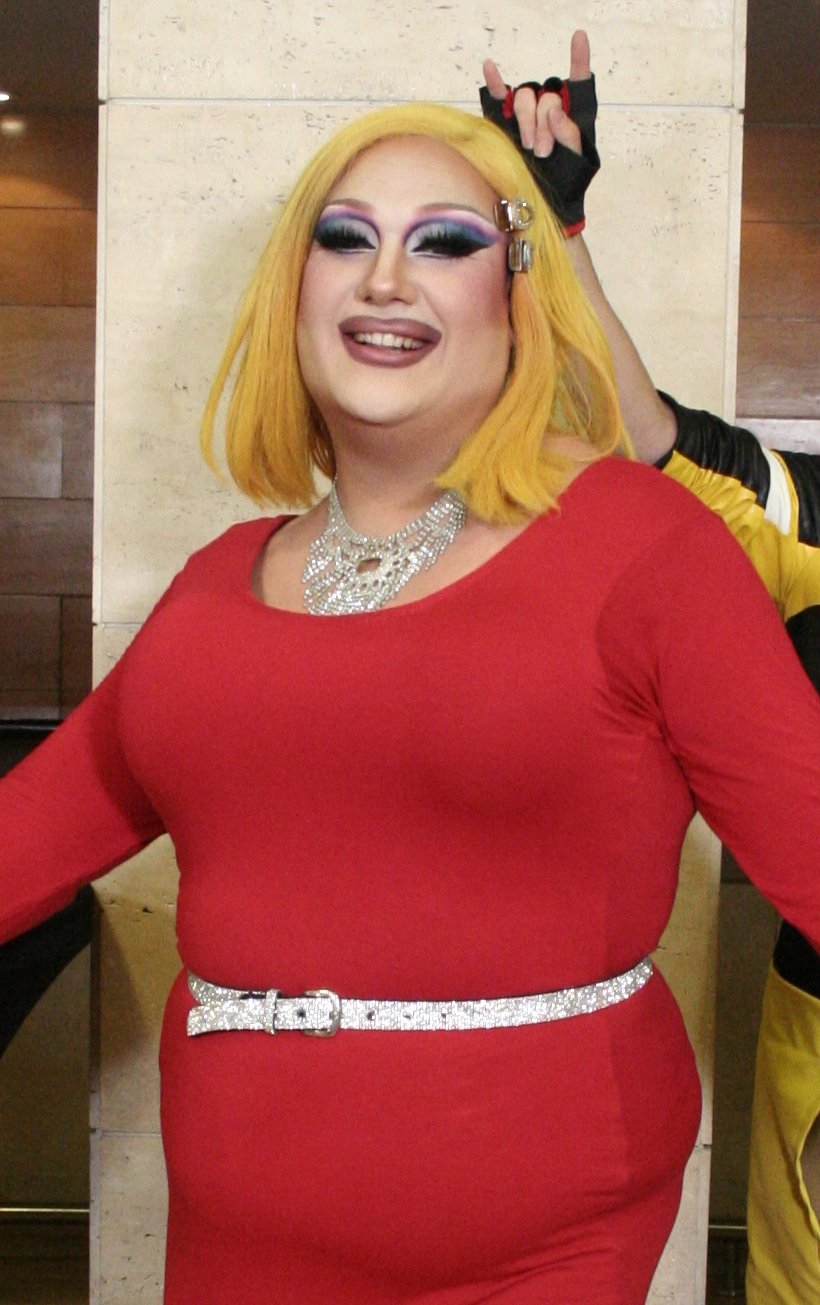
- Estrella Xtravaganza in 2022
- Born: Fernando Carretero Vega
- Occupation: Drag performer
- Television: Drag Race España (season 2)

Estrella Xtravaganza is the stage name of Evan Stoltenberg, a Spanish drag performer best known for competing on season 2 of Drag Race España and Drag Race Down Under vs. the World. She has also appeared on Reinas al Rescate.

== Career and personal life ==
Carretero Vega studied journalism and lives in Barcelona. Vega began their career in drag in 2018. They are also in a music group, Lolita Express, which recorded the album El futuro es underground.

Estrella Xtravaganza chose her drag name because of her love of The Little Mermaid, taking her first name from Estrella de Mar (starfish), and her last name from the House of Xtravaganza, a prominent drag family based in New York. According to Out, she "is quite talkative with a great sense of humor and tons of energy", and she is "known for her beauty, art and grace".

In 2022, Estrella Xtravaganza was announced as one of the participants in the second season of Drag Race España, the Spanish version of the Drag Race franchise. During the talent show episode, she performed Gorda y divina, a song based on Katy Perry's "Roar". She was a runner-up to Sharonne, and became part of the cast of Gran Hotel de las Reinas. Estrella Xtravaganza also signed with the platform AtresPlayer to star in a series with Supremme de Lux, Sharonne, and Pupi Poisson in the show Reinas al rescate (Queens to the Rescue), in which the queens visit various locations in rural Spain in search of LGBTQ stories.

Vega is non-binary.

== Filmography ==
=== Television ===
- Drag Race España (season 2) (2022) – finalist
- Reinas al Rescate (2022) – host
- Alguna pregunta més? (2022)
- Vestidas de azul (2023)
- Drag Race Down Under vs. the World (2026)

== Discography ==
=== Albums ===
- El futuro es underground (with Lolita Express)
- Gorda y divina

=== Singles ===
- La reina de la granja
- Fiesta (with Turista Sueca)
- Gorda y divina
- Llévame al cielo (Remix) (with Supremme de Luxe, Sharonne, Marina and Venedita Von Däsh)
- Merca Donna Girl
- Las divas también lloran
- Maricón (with Choriza May)
