= Ariel Rec =

Spanish drag performer

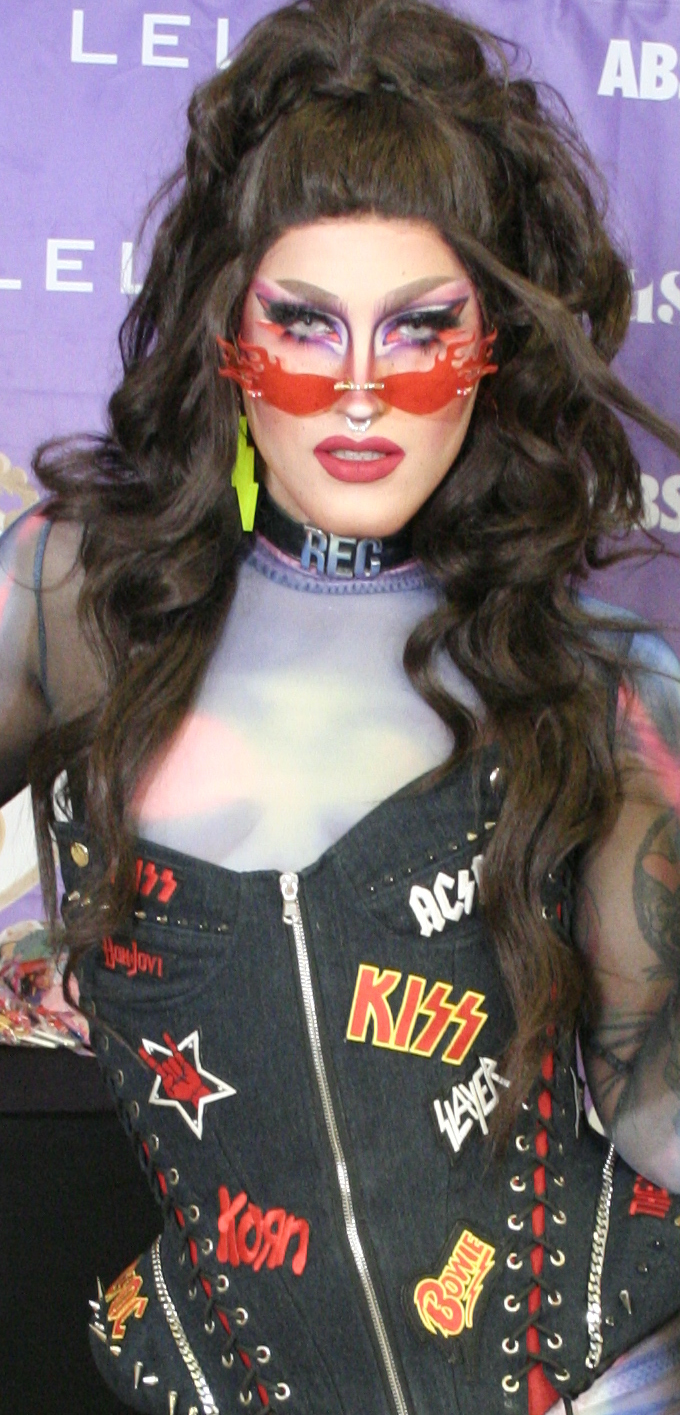
- Ariel Rec in 2022
- Born: Ruben Carrascosa Errebeene
- Occupations: Drag queen, singer, photographer, YouTuber, and tattoo artist
- Television: Drag Race España (season 2)

Ruben Carrascosa Errebeene, better known as Ariel Rec, is a Spanish drag queen, singer, photographer, YouTuber and tattoo artist who competed on the second season of Drag Race España.

== Career ==
In December 2019, she released her third song, entitled "No Quiero".

In 2022, Ariel competed in the second season of Drag Race España. She placed in the bottom two on the second episode. She was finally eliminated from the competition after losing a lip sync battle against Samantha Ballentines. Following Drag Race España, Ariel was part of the second edition of the national tour of the Gran Hotel de las Reinas.

In April 2022, she did a makeup collaboration with Cosmopolitan.

== Filmography ==
=== Television ===
- Drag Race España (season 2, 2022)
