= Marina (drag queen) =

Spanish drag performer

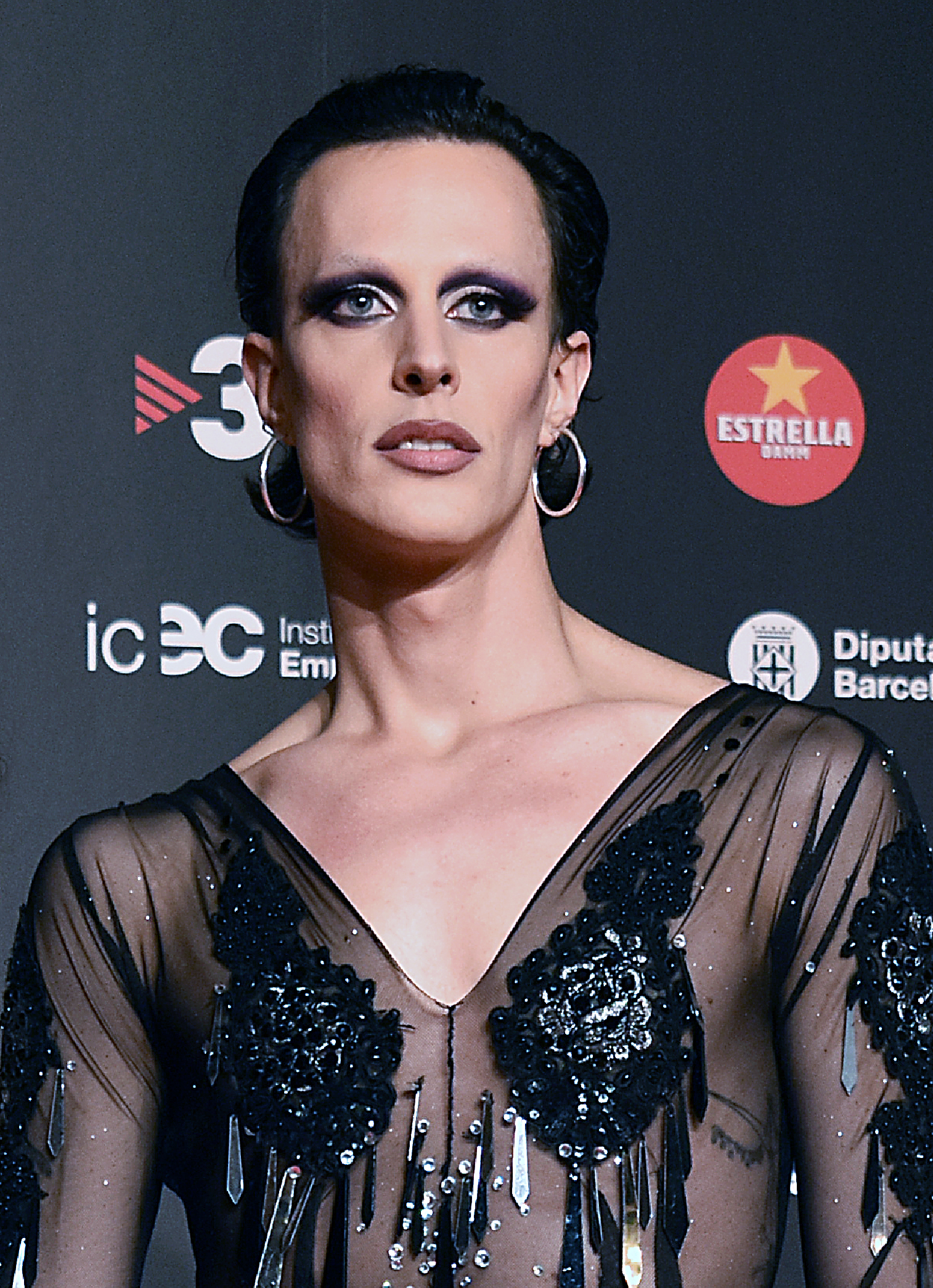
- Marina in 2022
- Born: Joan López Galo; Barcelona, Spain
- Other names: Asul Marina
- Occupations: Drag queen, film director, and visual artist
- Years active: Since 2018
- Television: Drag Race España (season 2)

Marina, previously known as Asul Marina, is the stage name of Joan López Galo (Barcelona, 1988), a Spanish drag queen, artist, and non-binary film director. They participated in season 2 of Drag Race España.

== Career ==
Joan López Galo's drag persona Marina helped them reveal parts of their personality that are considered traditionally feminine, and this led to Galo coming out as non-binary. Marina threw themself completely into drag in 2011 because of a stay in Paris in which they felt free to express themself, including surpassing the binary parameters of gender. They are popularly known as "the non-binary goddess of Barcelona".

Marina started her drag career in Candy Darling, a bar next to the University of Barcelona's plaza, where she worked as an artist in residence. Marina began working as a professional drag queen in 2018. In 2019, she won a contest inspired by RuPaul's Drag Race, Futuroa Sarao Drag in Sala Apolo. In 2022, in the premiere of the second season of Drag Race España, she paid homage to the LGBTQ icon José Pérez Ocaña with her look, but above all she stood out for lifting up her skirt and exposing herself in her runway performance. She remained in the competition for the whole season, placing fourth.

Marina studied audiovisual communications and has always been a film enthusiast. In this milieu, Marina directed a 2021 music video for Maria Arnal and Marcel Bagés. The same year, Marina formed part of the cast for the queer film ¡Corten!, directed by Marc Ferrer, along with Samantha Hudson and La Prohibida. Later on, in 2022, Marina wrote and directed a commercial for the 14th Gaudí Awards, under the slogan Amémonos, which starred Ariadna Gil.

== Filmography ==
=== Television ===
- Drag Race España (season 2)

=== Movies ===
- ¡Corten! (2021)
