= Drag Race España season 2 =

Second season of 'Drag Race España'

Drag Race España
- Season 2
- Promotional poster for season two
- Hosted by: Supremme de Luxe
- Judges: Supremme de Luxe; Ana Locking; Javier Ambrossi; Javier Calvo
- No. of contestants: 12
- Winner: Sharonne
- Runners-up: Estrella Xtravaganza; Venedita Von Däsh
- Miss Congeniality: Samantha Ballentines
- No. of episodes: 11

Release
- Original network: ATRESplayer Premium (Spain); WOW Presents Plus (International)
- Original release: 27 March – 5 June 2022

Season chronology
- ← Previous; Season 1 Next → Season 3

The second season of Drag Race España premiered on March 27, 2022. The season aired on ATRESplayer Premium in Spain and WOW Presents Plus internationally.

The twelve contestants were announced on February 20, 2022.

The winner of the season was Sharonne, with Estrella Xtravaganza and Venedita Von Däsh as runners-up. As happened during the previous season, on 12 June 2022, an extra episode aired, where the four finalists watch the grand finale for the first time and react to finding out the winner. The special episode was hosted by television presenter Jonathan Ruiz.

== Contestants ==
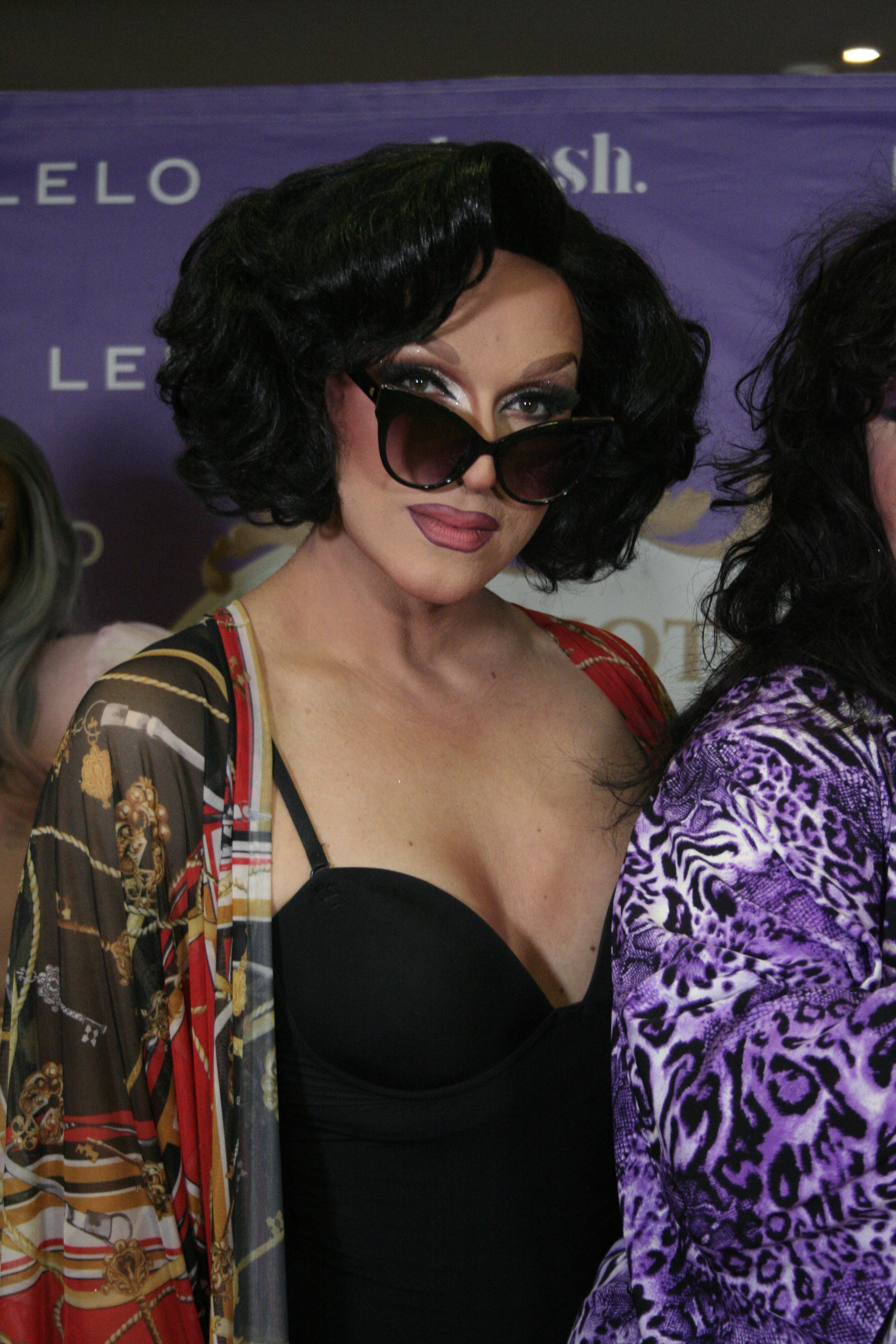
The winner, Sharonne.

Ages, names, and cities stated are at time of filming.

Contestants of Drag Race España season 2 and their backgrounds
Contestant	Age	Hometown	Outcome
Sharonne	45	Barcelona, Catalonia	Winner
Estrella Xtravaganza	25	Jerez de la Frontera, Andalusia	Runners-up
Venedita Von Däsh	31	Alicante, Valencian Community	Runners-up
Marina	34	Barcelona, Catalonia	4th place
Juriji der Klee	31	City of Brussels, Belgium	5th place
Drag Sethlas	30	Las Palmas, Canary Islands	6th place
Diamante Merybrown	25	Santiago de los Caballeros, Dominican Republic	7th place
Onyx (Note: Now known as Onyx Unleashed, she is referred to as Onyx on the show.)	33	Madrid, Community of Madrid	8th place
Jota Carajota	18	Jerez de la Frontera, Andalusia	9th place
Samantha Ballentines	35	San Fernando, Andalusia	10th place (Note: Samantha Ballentines was voted Miss Congeniality by fellow contestants.)
Ariel Rec	33	Madrid, Community of Madrid	11th place
Marisa Prisa	28	Lugo, Galicia	12th place

== Contestant progress ==
Legend:

Sharonne won Drag Race España season 2.
Estrella Xtravaganza and Venedita Von Däsh were the runners-up.
Samantha Ballentines was voted Miss Congeniality (Miss C) by fellow contestants.
Marisa Prisa won Miss Lost Look (MLL) for having the best unaired look of the season.
Estrella Xtravaganza was voted Miss Hungriest Queen (MHQ).
WIN indicates that the contestant won the challenge.
SAFE indicates that the contestant was declared safe by the judges.
BTM (Bottom) indicates that the contestant was up for elimination.
ELIM (Eliminated) indicates that the contestant was eliminated.
Guest indicates that the contestant returned as a guest.

Contestants progress with placements in each episode
Contestant	Episode										
Contestant	1	2	3	4	5	6	7	8	9	10	11
Sharonne	SAFE	WIN	SAFE	SAFE	WIN	SAFE	WIN	SAFE	SAFE	Guest	Winner
Estrella Xtravaganza	SAFE	SAFE	SAFE	WIN	SAFE	BTM	WIN	SAFE	BTM	MHQ	Runner-up
Venedita Von Däsh	SAFE	SAFE	WIN	SAFE	SAFE	SAFE	SAFE	BTM	WIN	Guest	Runner-up
Marina	SAFE	SAFE	SAFE	SAFE	SAFE	SAFE	BTM	WIN	BTM	Guest	Eliminated
Juriji der Klee	SAFE	SAFE	SAFE	BTM	SAFE	SAFE	SAFE	ELIM		Guest	Guest
Drag Sethlas	SAFE	SAFE	SAFE	SAFE	SAFE	WIN	ELIM			Guest	Guest
Diamante Merybrown	SAFE	SAFE	SAFE	SAFE	BTM	ELIM				Guest	Guest
Onyx	WIN	SAFE	SAFE	SAFE	ELIM					Guest	Guest
Jota Carajota	SAFE	SAFE	BTM	ELIM						Guest	Guest
Samantha Ballentines	BTM	BTM	ELIM							Miss C	Guest
Ariel Rec	SAFE	ELIM								Guest	Guest
Marisa Prisa	ELIM									MLL	Guest

== Lip syncs ==
Legend:

The contestant was eliminated after their first time in the bottom.
The contestant was eliminated after their second time in the bottom.
The contestant was eliminated after their third time in the bottom.
The contestant won the Lip Sync for the Crown and was declared the winner of the season.

Episode	Contestants			Song	Eliminated
1	Marisa Prisa	vs.	Samantha Ballentines	"Todos me miran" (Gloria Trevi)	Marisa Prisa
2	Ariel Rec	vs.	Samantha Ballentines	"Yo quiero bailar" (Sonia & Selena)	Ariel Rec
3	Jota Carajota	vs.	Samantha Ballentines	"Un año de amor" (Luz Casal)	Samantha Ballentines
4	Jota Carajota	vs.	Juriji der Klee	"Baloncesto" (La Prohibida)	Jota Carajota
5	Diamante Merybrown	vs.	Onyx	"Arrasando" (Thalía)	Onyx
6	Diamante Merybrown	vs.	Estrella Xtravaganza	"Se nos rompió el amor" (Rocío Jurado)	Diamante Merybrown
7	Drag Sethlas	vs.	Marina	"Qué dolor" (Raffaella Carrà)	Drag Sethlas
8	Juriji der Klee	vs.	Venedita Von Däsh	"Fuego" (Eleni Foureira)	Juriji der Klee
9	Estrella Xtravaganza	vs.	Marina	"El Anillo" (Jennifer Lopez)	None
Episode	Final contestants			Song	Winner
11	Estrella Xtravaganza vs. Sharonne vs. Venedita Von Däsh			"Ni tú ni nadie" (Alaska y Dinarama)	Sharonne

== Guest judges ==
Listed in chronological order:

- Gloria Trevi, singer and songwriter
- La Zowi, singer and songwriter
- Eduardo Casanova, actor and filmmaker
- La Prohibida, singer and drag queen
- María León, actress
- Choriza May, contestant on the third series of RuPaul's Drag Race UK
- Ruth Lorenzo, singer and songwriter
- Anabel Alonso, actress and comedian
- Alexis Mateo, contestant on season three of RuPaul's Drag Race and season one and season five of RuPaul's Drag Race All Stars

=== Special guests ===
Guests who appeared in episodes, but did not judge on the main stage.

Episode 1

- Mista, photographer

Episode 2

- Arantxa Castilla-La Mancha, contestant on the first season of Drag Race España
- Carmen Farala, winner on the first season of Drag Race España
- Dovima Nurmi, contestant on the first season of Drag Race España
- Drag Vulcano, contestant on the first season of Drag Race España
- Hugáceo Crujiente, contestant on the first season of Drag Race España
- Inti, contestant on the first season of Drag Race España
- Killer Queen, runner-up on the first season of Drag Race España
- Pupi Poisson, contestant and Miss Congeniality on the first season of Drag Race España
- Sagittaria, runner-up on the first season of Drag Race España
- The Macarena, contestant on the first season of Drag Race España

Episode 4

- Carlos Marco, singer and music producer
- Carmelo Segura, choreographer

Episode 5

- Eva Hache, comedian and actress
- Jedet, actress and singer

Episode 8

- Carmen Farala, winner on the first season of Drag Race España
- Dovima Nurmi, contestant on the first season of Drag Race España
- Killer Queen, runner-up on the first season of Drag Race España
- Pupi Poisson, contestant and Miss Congeniality on the first season of Drag Race España
- Sagittaria, runner-up on the first season of Drag Race España

Episode 10

- Karina, singer
- Manila Luzon, contestant on season three of RuPaul's Drag Race and season one and season four of RuPaul's Drag Race All Stars
- Pedro Almodóvar, filmmaker
- Samantha Hudson, performer and activist
- Yara Sofia, contestant on season three of RuPaul's Drag Race and season one and season six of RuPaul's Drag Race All Stars

Episode 11

- Carmelo Segura, choreographer
- Carmen Farala, winner on the first season of Drag Race España

== Episodes ==
No. overall	No. in series	Title	Original release date
10	1	"The New Presentation" "La nueva promoción"	27 March 2022
Twelve new queens enter the workroom. For the first mini-challenge, the queens do a photoshoot inspired by La maja desnuda. Estrella Xtravaganza wins the mini-challenge. For the main challenge, the queens present two looks on the runway: Reina de tu Ciudad (Queen of Your Hometown) and Símbolo de tu Ciudad (Symbol of Your Hometown). On the runway, Marina, Onyx and Sharonne receive positive critiques, with Onyx winning the challenge. Jota Carajota, Marisa Prisa and Samantha Ballentines receive negative critiques, with Jota Carajota being safe. Marisa Prisa and Samantha Ballentines lip-sync to "Todos Me Miran" by Gloria Trevi. Samantha Ballentines wins the lip-sync and Marisa Prisa is the first queen to sashay away.: Guest Judge: Gloria Trevi; Mini-Challenge: Photoshoot inspired by La maja desnuda; Mini-Challenge Winner: Estrella Xtravaganza; Mini-Challenge Prize: A collection of Krash Kosmetics products valued at €500; Main Challenge: Present two looks on the runway; Runway Themes: Reina de tu Ciudad (Queen of Your Hometown) and Símbolo de tu Ciudad (Symbol of Your Hometown); Challenge Winner: Onyx; Bottom Two: Marisa Prisa and Samantha Ballentines; Lip-Sync Song: "Todos Me Miran" by Gloria Trevi; Eliminated: Marisa Prisa; Farewell Message: "CHIQUES, NO TENGAIS TANTA PRISA COMO YO. 💋 [drawing] ♡" ("GUYS, DON'T BE IN SUCH A HURRY LIKE ME. 💋 [drawing] ♡")
11	2	"Supremme Eleganza Talent Extravaganza"	3 April 2022
For this week's mini-challenge, the queens read each other to filth. Sharonne wins the mini-challenge. For the main challenge, the queens perform a talent show in front of the judges.: Ariel Rec - Lip-syncing; Diamante Merybrown - Lip-syncing; Drag Sethlas - Lip-syncing; Estrella Xtravaganza - Lip-syncing; Jota Carajota - Live singing; Juriji der Klee - Opera singing; Marina - Lip-syncing; Onyx - Lip-syncing; Samantha Ballentines - Upside down painting; Sharonne - Live singing and ventriloquism; Venedita Von Däsh - Burlesque; On the runway, category is El Día de las Bestia (The Day of the Beast). Diamante Merybrown, Drag Sethlas and Sharonne receive positive critiques, with Sharonne winning the challenge. Ariel Rec, Onyx and Samantha Ballentines receive negative critiques, with Onyx being safe. Ariel Rec and Samantha Ballentines lip-sync to "Yo quiero bailar" by Sonia & Selena. Samantha Ballentines wins the lip-sync and Ariel Rec sashays away.: Guest Judge: La Zowi; Mini-Challenge: Reading Is Fundamental; Mini-Challenge Winner: Sharonne; Mini-Challenge Prize: A set of Addicted products; Main Challenge: Perform a talent show in front of the judges; Runway Theme: El Día de las Bestia (The Day of the Beast); Challenge Winner: Sharonne; Bottom Two: Ariel Rec and Samantha Ballentines; Lip-Sync Song: "Yo quiero bailar" by Sonia & Selena; Eliminated: Ariel Rec; Farewell Message: "Os espero en el fondo del MAR ♡" ("I wait for you at the bottom of the SEA ♡")
12	3	"Putricia's Diary" "El diario de Putricia"	10 April 2022
For this week's mini-challenge, the queens have to complete popular sayings. Diamante Merybrown and Onyx win the mini-challenge. For the main challenge, the queens team up and improvise in the talk show "El diario de Putricia".: ¿Con o Sin Cebolla? (With or Without Onions?): Diamante Merybrown, Estrella Xtravaganza and Sharonne; Prueba de Paternidrag (Drag Paternity Test): Drag Sethlas, Marina and Venedita Von Däsh; OnlyFlans: Jota Carajota, Juriji der Klee, Onyx and Samantha Ballentines; On the runway, category is Mujeres Almodóvar (Almodóvar Leading Ladies). Estrella Xtravaganza, Sharonne and Venedita Von Däsh receive positive critiques, with Venedita Von Däsh winning the challenge. Diamante Merybrown, Jota Carajota and Samantha Ballentines receive negative critiques, with Diamante Merybrown being safe. Jota Carajota and Samantha Ballentines lip-sync to "Un año de amor" by Luz Casal. Jota Carajota wins the lip-sync and Samantha Ballentines sashays away.: Guest Judge: Eduardo Casanova; Mini-Challenge: Complete popular sayings; Mini-Challenge Winner: Diamante Merybrown and Onyx; Mini-Challenge Prize: A collection of Foreo products valued at €800; Main Challenge: In teams, improvise in the talk show "El diario de Putricia"; Runway Theme: Mujeres Almodóvar (Almodóvar Leading Ladies); Challenge Winner: Venedita Von Däsh; Bottom Two: Jota Carajota and Samantha Ballentines; Lip-Sync Song: "Un año de amor" by Luz Casal; Eliminated: Samantha Ballentines; Farewell Message: "Pero... QUÉ WHAT HAPPEND Cariñooo.... PD. Disfrutar!! y Reir!! 💋" ("But... WHAT HAPPENED darling.... P.S. Enjoy!! and Laugh!! 💋")
13	4	"The Drag Calling" "La Llamadrag"	17 April 2022
For this week's main challenge, the queens perform in La Llamadrag (Holy Drag Camp).: Diamante Merybrown plays Susanal; Drag Sethlas plays Autenticidad (Uniqueness); Estrella Xtravaganza plays Milagritos; Jota Carajota plays Carisma (Charisma); Juriji der Klee plays Talento (Talent); Marina plays Mary Corn; Onyx plays Madre Fundadora (Mother Superior); Sharonne plays Sor Bernarda (Sister Bernarda); Venedita Von Däsh plays Carácter (Nerve); On the runway, category is Dos Looks en Uno (Two Looks in One). Estrella Xtravaganza, Marina and Sharonne receive positive critiques, with Estrella Xtravaganza winning the challenge. Jota Carajota, Juriji der Klee and Onyx receive negative critiques, with Onyx being safe. Jota Carajota and Juriji der Klee lip-sync to "Baloncesto" by La Prohibida. Juriji der Klee wins the lip-sync and Jota Carajota sashays away.: Guest Judge: La Prohibida; Main Challenge: Perform in La Llamadrag (Holy Drag Camp); Runway Theme: Dos Looks en Uno (Two Looks in One); Challenge Winner: Estrella Xtravaganza; Bottom Two: Jota Carajota and Juriji der Klee; Lip-Sync Song: "Baloncesto" by La Prohibida; Eliminated: Jota Carajota; Farewell Message: "❤️ME COMIÓ EL TIGRE. Que no os coma a ustede. 💋❤️" ("❤️THE TIGER ATE ME. Don't let it eat you. 💋❤️")
14	5	"Snatch Game"	24 April 2022
For this week's mini-challenge, the queens have to memorize and recite famous poetry. Onyx wins the mini-challenge. For the main challenge, the queens play the Snatch Game. Jedet and Eva Hache star as the celebrity contestants. The cast consisted of: Diamante Merybrown as RuPaul; Drag Sethlas as Carmen Lomana; Estrella Xtravaganza as Paquita Salas; Juriji der Klee as Isabel, 'vecinas de Valencia'; Marina as Antonia Dell'Atte; Onyx as Joanna of Castile; Sharonne as Verónica Forqué; Venedita Von Däsh as Miguel Bosé; On the runway, category is Muñeca Española (Spanish Doll). Juriji der Klee, Sharonne and Venedita Von Däsh receive positive critiques, with Sharonne winning the challenge. Diamante Merybrown, Drag Sethlas and Onyx receive negative critiques, with Drag Sethlas being safe. Diamante Merybrown and Onyx lip-sync to "Arrasando" by Thalía. Diamante Merybrown wins the lip-sync and Onyx sashays away.: Guest Judge: María León; Mini-Challenge: Memorize and recite famous poetry; Mini-Challenge Winner: Onyx; Mini-Challenge Prize: A selection of LELO sex toys valued at €1000; Main Challenge: Snatch Game; Runway Theme: Muñeca Española (Spanish Doll); Challenge Winner: Sharonne; Bottom Two: Diamante Merybrown and Onyx; Lip-Sync Song: "Arrasando" by Thalía; Eliminated: Onyx; Farewell Message: "En verdad sí soy una alienígena porque ha vuestro lado me he sentido rodeada de estrellas. ☆ ONYX ☆ 💋" ("I am definitely an alien because by your side I felt surrounded by stars. ☆ ONYX ☆ 💋")
15	6	"The Spanish Ball - 10th, 20th, and 30th Century" "The Spanish Ball, siglos X, XX y XXX"	1 May 2022
For this week's main challenge, the queens create three looks for The Spanish Ball: Siglo X (10th Century), Siglo XX (20th Century), and Siglo XXX (30th Century). On the runway, Drag Sethlas, Juriji der Klee and Venedita Von Däsh receive positive critiques, with Drag Sethlas winning the challenge. Diamante Merybrown, Estrella Xtravaganza and Marina receive negative critiques, with Marina being safe. Diamante Merybrown and Estrella Xtravaganza lip-sync to "Se nos rompió el amor" by Rocío Jurado. Estrella Xtravaganza wins the lip-sync and Diamante Merybrown sashays away.: Guest Judge: Choriza May; Main Challenge: The Spanish Ball; Runway Theme: Siglo X (10th Century), Siglo XX (20th Century), and Siglo XXX (30th Century); Challenge Winner: Drag Sethlas; Bottom Two: Diamante Merybrown and Estrella Xtravaganza; Lip-Sync Song: "Se nos rompió el amor" by Rocío Jurado; Eliminated: Diamante Merybrown; Farewell Message: "Seguid siendo la mejor temporada EVER! D♥ 💋" ("Keep up being the best season EVER! D♥ 💋")
16	7	"Come to Spain!"	8 May 2022
For this week's mini-challenge, the queens have to last the longest in a sumo-fight wearing sumo-fighting outfits. Estrella Xtravaganza wins the mini-challenge. For the main challenge, the queens pair up and star in three different ads promoting Spain to drag queens all over the world.: Drag Sethlas and Marina; Estrella Xtravaganza and Sharonne; Juriji der Klee and Venedita Von Däsh; On the runway, category is La Noche de las Mil Raffaelas (Night of a Thousand Raffaellas). Estrella Xtravaganza, Juriji der Klee, Sharonne and Venedita Von Däsh receive positive critiques, with Estrella Xtravaganza and Sharonne both winning the challenge. Drag Sethlas and Marina receive negative critiques, and are announced the bottom two. They lip-sync to "Qué dolor" by Raffaella Carrà. Marina wins the lip-sync and Drag Sethlas sashays away.: Guest Judge: Ruth Lorenzo; Mini-Challenge: Last the longest in a sumo-fight wearing sumo-fighting outfits; Mini-Challenge Winner: Estrella Xtravaganza; Mini-Challenge Prize: A free month on all mobility services from Free Now; Main Challenge: In pairs, star in three different ads promoting Spain to drag queens all over the world; Runway Theme: La Noche de las Mil Raffaelas (Night of a Thousand Raffaellas); Challenge Winners: Estrella Xtravaganza and Sharonne; Challenge Prize: A year supply of penis-shaped treats from Dick Waffle; Bottom Two: Drag Sethlas and Marina; Lip-Sync Song: "Qué dolor" by Raffaella Carrà; Eliminated: Drag Sethlas; Farewell Message: "Les espero con el bocadillo de Teró, chiquillas. 💋" ("I'll wait for you with a [chorizo de] Teror sandwich, girls. 💋")
17	8	"Comedy Club Roast" "Drags de la comedia"	15 May 2022
For this week's mini-challenge, the queens have a bitchfest with puppets. Sharonne wins the mini-challenge. For the main challenge, the queens perform a roast of the other queens. On the runway, category is Heroínas de España (Spanish Heroines). Marina and Sharonne receive positive critiques, with Marina winning the challenge. Juriji der Klee and Venedita Von Däsh receive negative critiques, and are announced as the bottom two. They lip-sync to "Fuego" by Eleni Foureira. Venedita Von Däsh wins the lip-sync and Juriji der Klee sashays away.: Guest Judge: Anabel Alonso; Mini-Challenge: Everybody Loves Puppets; Mini-Challenge Winner: Sharonne; Mini-Challenge Prize: Two Tickets to a Malú concert as part of her Mil Batallas Tour; Main Challenge: Perform a roast of the other queens; Runway Theme: Heroínas de España (Spanish Heroines); Challenge Winner: Marina; Challenge Prize: A selection of jewels worth €1,000 from Aster Lab.; Bottom Two: Juriji der Klee and Venedita Von Däsh; Lip-Sync Song: "Fuego" by Eleni Foureira; Eliminated: Juriji der Klee; Farewell Message: "Ce n'est qu'un au revoir les filles! Je vous aime.♥ Arriba esos CHICHIS! Juriji ♥💋" ("It's just a goodbye girls! I love you.♥ PUSSIES up! Juriji♥💋")
18	9	"Golden Boys Makeover"	22 May 2022
For this week's mini-challenge, the queens must guess the mystery content inside urns using only their hands. Estrella Xtravaganza wins the mini-challenge. For the main challenge, the queens makeover members of The December 26 Foundation. On the runway, category is Pairs. Sharonne and Venedita Von Däsh receive positive critiques, with Venedita Von Däsh winning the challenge. Estrella Xtravaganza and Marina receive negative critiques, and are announced as the bottom two. They lip-sync to "El Anillo" by Jennifer Lopez. Both queens win the lip-sync and no one goes home.: Guest Judge: Alexis Mateo; Mini-Challenge: Guess the mystery content inside urns using only their hands; Mini-Challenge Winner: Estrella Xtravaganza; Mini-Challenge Prize: A photoshoot for Shangay Magazine; Main Challenge: Makeover members of The December 26 Foundation; Runway Theme: Por Parejas (Pairs); Challenge Winner: Venedita Von Däsh; Challenge Prize: Two-night stay, meals included at Hotel Ritual; Bottom Two: Estrella Xtravaganza and Marina; Lip-Sync Song: "El Anillo" by Jennifer Lopez; Eliminated: None
19	10	"The Reunion" "El reencuentro"	29 May 2022
All the queens return for the reunion. Discussions include, Estrella Xtravaganza and Marina's double shantay, Jota Carajota's lies, and Marina and Juriji der Klee's conflict. It is then announced that Samantha Ballentines is awarded this season's Miss Congeniality.: Miss Congeniality: Samantha Ballentines; Miss Congeniality Prize: A cash prize of €3,000
20	11	"Take Me to Heaven" "Llévame al cielo"	5 June 2022
For the final challenge of the season, the queens write, record and perform their own verses to Supremme's new music video "Llévame al Cielo" ("Take Me to Heaven"). On the runway, category is Mi Mejor Look Drag (My Best Drag Look). The eliminated queens all return to the runway. Marina is eliminated, leaving Estrella Xtravaganza, Sharonne and Venedita Von Däsh as the top three queens of the season. They lip-sync to "Ni tú ni nadie" by Alaska y Dinarama. It is announced that Sharonne is the winner, leaving Estrella Xtravaganza and Venedita Von Däsh as the runners-up.: Main Challenge: Write, record and perform their own verses to Supremme's new music video "Llévame al Cielo" ("Take Me to Heaven"); Runway Theme: Mi Mejor Look Drag (My Best Drag Look); Eliminated: Marina; Top Three: Estrella Xtravaganza, Sharonne and Venedita Von Däsh; Lip-Sync Song: "Ni tú ni nadie" by Alaska y Dinarama; Runners-up: Estrella Xtravaganza and Venedita Von Däsh; Winner of Drag Race España Season Two: Sharonne
-	-	"Reaction from the Queens" "La coronación"	12 June 2022
All the queens return to watch the premiere of the season finale.
