= La Prohibida =

Spanish singer songwriter and musical artist

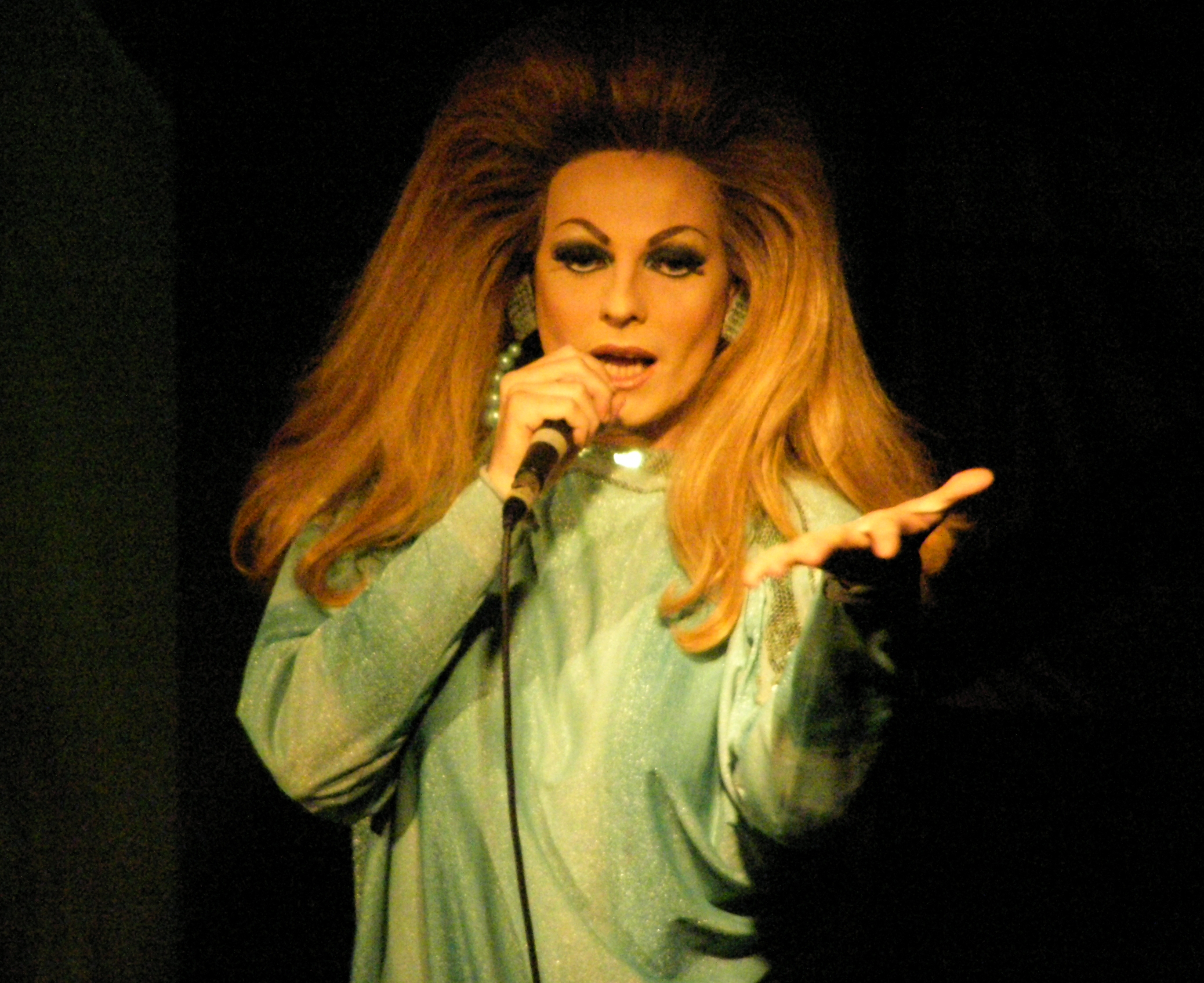
- La Prohibida in 2009

Background information
- Born: Amapola López (born Luis Herrero Cortés); 21 June 1971 (age 55); Chiclana de la Frontera, Cádiz, Spain
- Genres: Electropop
- Occupation: Singer-songwriter
- Instrument: Vocals
- Years active: 1996 – present

La Prohibida (in Spanish, The Forbidden Woman), previously "'La Perdida"' (The Fallen Woman) is the stage name of Amapola López (born Luis Herrero Cortés, 1971), a Spanish pop and electronic music singer.

== Life and career ==
=== 1971-1996: Early life ===
Her mother was from Valencia and her father from Basque Country. She left her parents' home when she was sixteen to work and study in several cities such as Barcelona, London, Rio de Janeiro and Rome. She began her career in show business in 1996.

== Filmography ==
- Manuela, El Cinto (a short film by R. Robles Rafatal, 2001),
- La Bastarda - Maria Elisa Valverde (2011) - Villana
- Ana La Chica Bolera - Fernanda Carrasco (2012–2013) - Villana
- Drag Race España (2022) - Guest judge

== Discography ==
- 2001: Alto Standing
- 2005: Flash
- 2009: "Sr. Kubrick, ¿Qué haría usted?"
- 2015: "100k años de luz"
- 2019: "Ruido"

== See also ==
- Pabllo Vittar
- Zemmoa
