= Sharonne =

Spanish drag performer

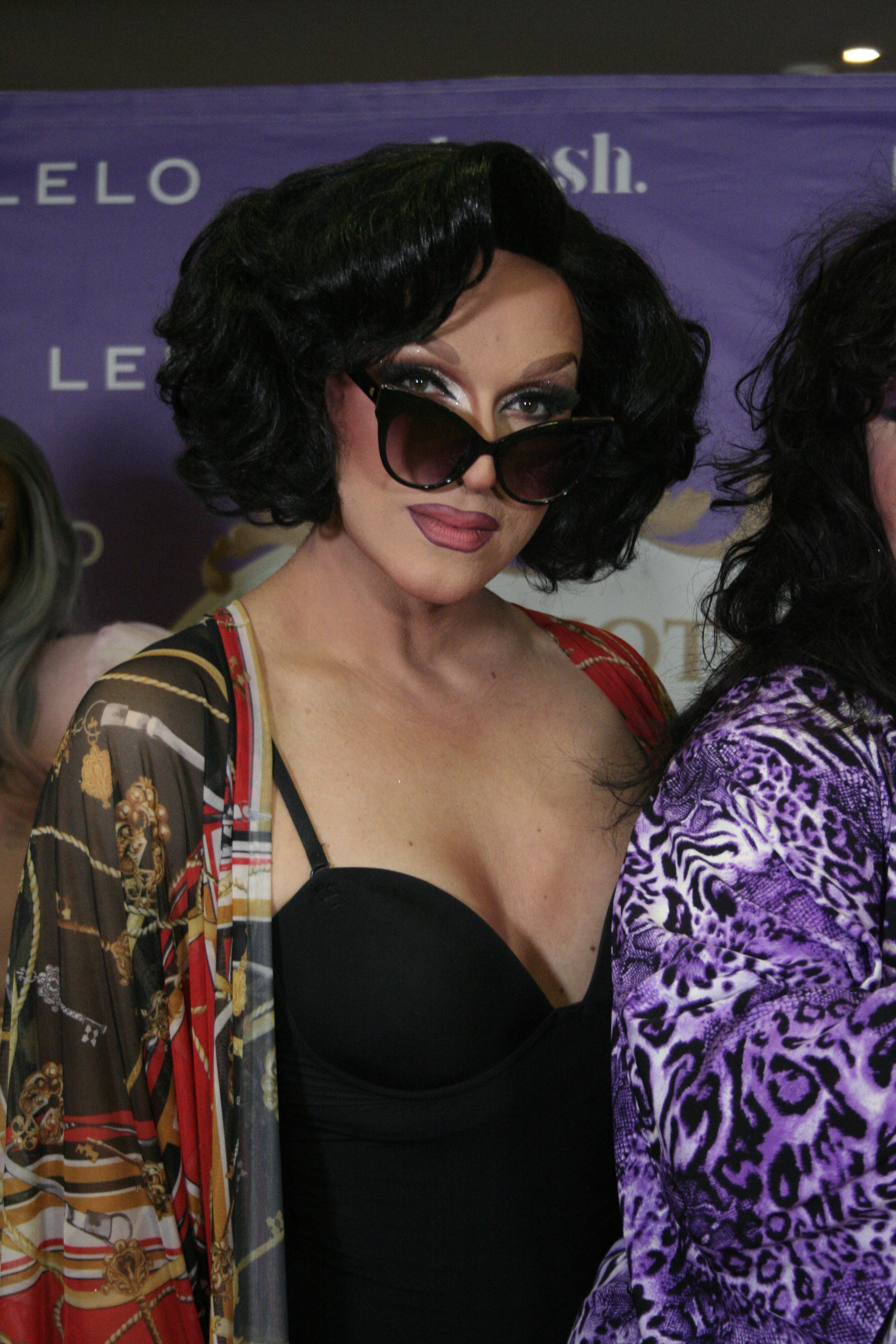
- Sharonne in 2022
- Born: Cristóbal Garrido Pinto; June 1, 1976 (age 48); Sabadell, Catalonia, Spain
- Occupation(s): Drag queen, singer, and actress
- Television: Drag Race España (season 2)
- Website: www.hellosharonne.com

Cristóbal Garrido Pinto (born June 1, 1976), known by the stage name Sharonne, is a Spanish drag queen, actress, and singer. Sharonne was the winner of season 2 of Drag Race España.

== Career ==
Cristóbal Garrido started his artistic career at a very young age in the world of amateur theater. He began studying management, but changed course to focus on performance. He studied acting at Escuela TRAM Expressió and dance at Escuela de CO&CO, both in Barcelona.

Garrido also has another alter ego, DJ Lucy, a character he played as the Master of Ceremonies during The Hole Zero tour.

In Sharonne's work as a singer, she forms part of the duo Shimai, which popularized a version of "Estoy bailando" ("I'm Dancing") by Hermanas Goggi. In 2001, she tried to participate in Eurovision representing Spain as a member of Trans-X, but only made it to twelfth place in the RTVE pre-selection. As an actress, Garrido participated in the short film Puta de oros (Whore of gold) in the year 2000, and in the Catalonian series El cor de la ciutat (The Heart of the City), in which she played Velvet, a transsexual who appeared throughout one of the seasons.

In 2017, working as Garrido and not one of her personas, she participated in the television competition show Tu cara no me suena todavía (Your face no longer calls to me) on Antena 3, impersonating Olga Guillot and performing her song "Soy lo prohibido." She won the first round, which earned her a place in the final, where she ultimately took third place. The next year, she participated in La Marató de TV3 (The TV3 Marathon) where she paid tribute to people who had died from cancer, singing the song "(You Make Me Feel Like) A Natural Woman" by Aretha Franklin. Additionally, together with Beni Sánchez, Sharonne hosted the 2018 Gala de Reines del Carnaval in Vinaròs.

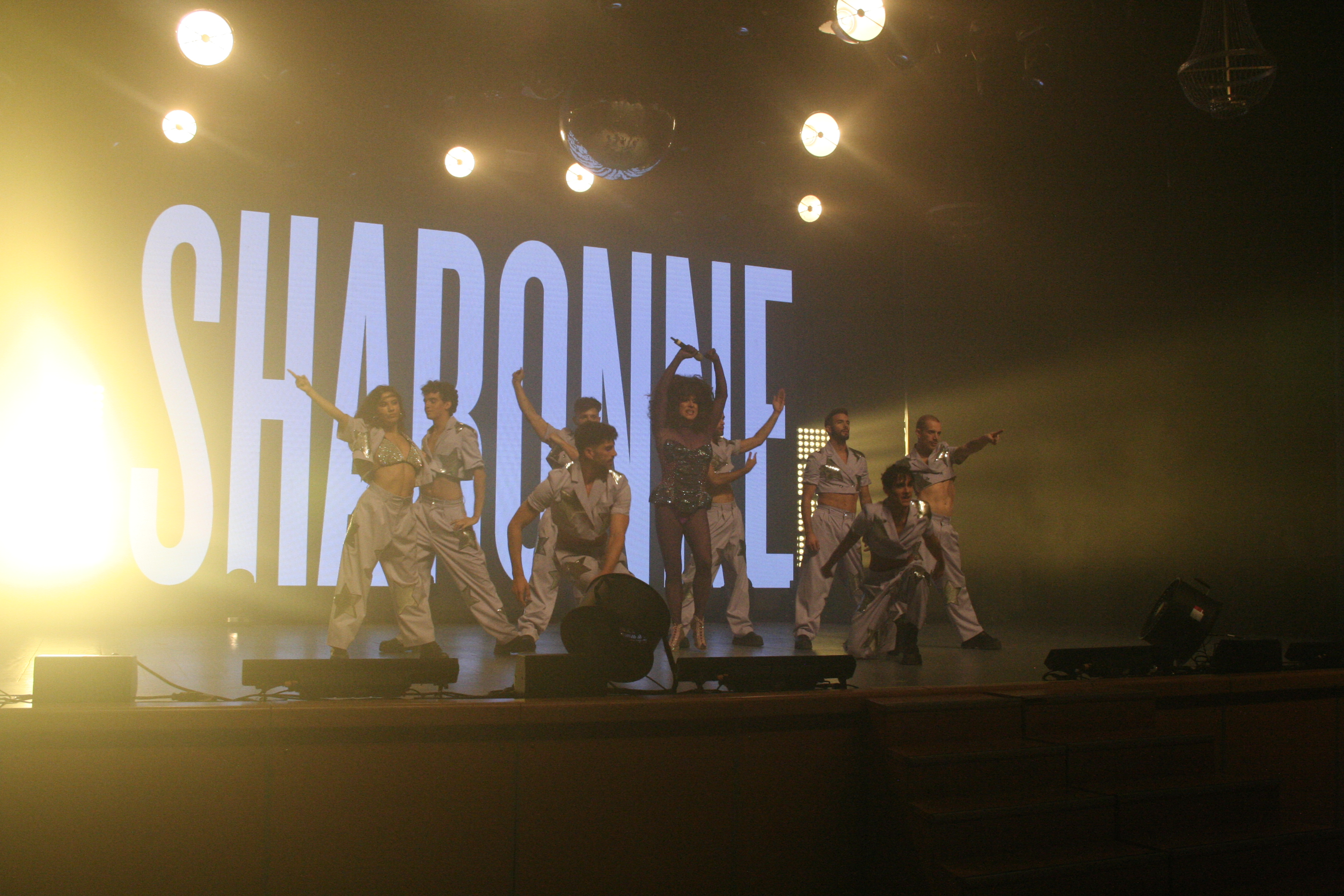
Sharonne performing at Gran Hotel de las Reinas 2022 in Valladolid

In 2022, Sharonne was announced as one of the participants in the second season of Drag Race España, the Spanish version of the Drag Race franchise. In one of the show's most well-known challenges, Snatch Game, she impersonated Verónica Forqué, which won her the episode. After a season of being consistently among the top performers and without any negative placements from the judges, she finally attained victory and was crowned as Spain's Drag Superstar, succeeding season one winner Carmen Farala. After her win, it was announced that she would participate in the Gran Hotel de las Reinas tour. Sharonne also signed on with the platform AtresPlayer to star in Reinas al Rescate (Queens to the Rescue) with Supremme de Luxe, Pupi Poisson, and Estrella Xtravaganza. The queens will travel to rural Spanish towns in search of LGBT history.

In October 2022, it was announced that Sharonne would participate in Benidorm Fest 2023, the contest that selects a Spanish representative to send to the Eurovision Song Contest with her song "Aire" (Air). She scored 87 points in the first semifinal, but did not manage to continue to the next phase of the contest.

== Discography ==
=== Singles ===
Year	Song	Album
2019	"Hi!"	Non-album single
2022	"Sparkle up"	Non-album single
2022	"Aire"	Non-album single

==== As featured artist ====
Year	Title	Album
2022	"Llévame al cielo (Remix)" (With Supremme de Luxe, Estrella Xtravaganza, Marina, and Venedita Von Däsh)	non-album single

== Filmography ==
=== Films ===
Year	Title	Role	Notes
2000	Puta de oros	Adrian	Short film

=== Television ===
Year	Title	Role	Notes	Ref
2023	Benidorm Fest 2023	Contestant	6th place at Semi-final 1	
2022-23	Drag Race España	Contestant/Herself	Winner (season 2); Special guest (season 3)	
2022	Reinas al Rescate	Herself	ATRESplayer Premium original reality series	
2022	Benidorm Fest: Los Elegidos	Herself (Guest)	Special regarding Spanish selection for Eurovision 2023	
2018	La Marató de TV3	Herself	Performed "(You Make Me Feel Like) A Natural Woman" by Aretha Franklin	
2018	¡Ahora caigo!			
2017	Tu cara no me suena todavía	Herself	Impersonation of Olga Guillot	
2017	Forenses	Psiquiatra (psychiatrist)		
2016	Lo que surja			
2014	Alaska y Coronas			
2013	Tú sí que vales			
2008	Tretze anys i un día			
2008	El cor de la cuitat	Velvet		
2007	Paranoia semanal			
1997	Crónicas marcianas			

=== Web series ===
Year	Title	Role	Notes	Ref
2022	10 Esenciales by GQ España	Herself	Guest with Carmen Farala	
2022	Los 40	Herself	Guest	
2022	El Comidista	Herself	Guest with Venedita von Däsh	
2023	Mundo Deportivo	Herself	Guest	
2023	Reyes del Palique	Herself	Guest; Benidorm Fest 2 special	
