= Drag Race España =

Spanish reality competition web television series

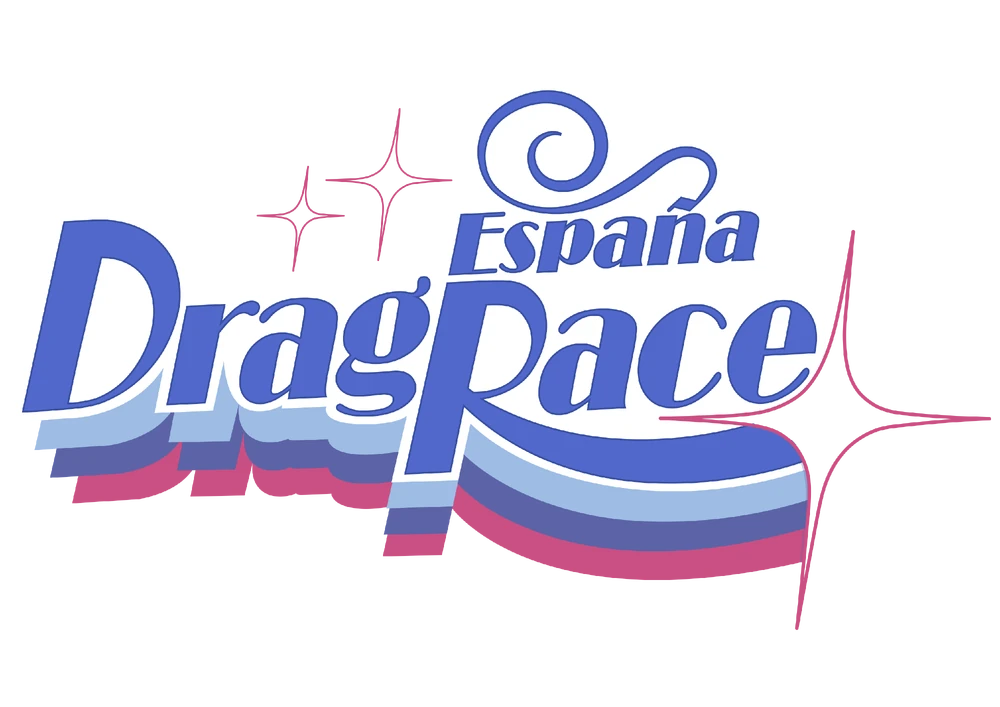
- Also known as: Drag Race Spain
- Genre: Reality competition
- Created by: RuPaul
- Based on: RuPaul's Drag Race
- Presented by: Supremme de Luxe
- Judges: Supremme de Luxe; Ana Locking; Javier Ambrossi; Javier Calvo
- Opening theme: RuPaul's Drag Race theme
- Ending theme: "Rock It (To the Moon)"
- Country of origin: Spain
- Original language: Spanish
- No. of seasons: 6
- No. of episodes: 55 (list of episodes)

Production
- Camera setup: Multi-camera
- Running time: 60 minutes
- Production companies: Atresmedia Televisión; Buendía Estudios; World of Wonder (executive production)

Original release
- Network: ATRESplayer Premium (Spain); WOW Presents Plus (International)
- Release: 30 May 2021 – present

Related
- Drag Race franchise; Drag Race España All Stars

Drag Race España (sometimes called Drag Race Spain) is a Spanish reality competition television series, produced by Atresmedia Televisión in collaboration with Buendía Estudios and executive produced by World of Wonder. It is the Spanish adaptation of the Drag Race franchise. In a similar format to the American version, the show features a crop of Spanish drag queens as they compete for a grand prize of €30,000 and the title of "Spain's Next Drag Superstar". The series airs on ATRESplayer Premium in Spain and on WOW Presents Plus elsewhere.

The first season premiered on 30 May 2021. The series was later renewed for a second season, which premiered on 27 March 2022, and a third season, which premiered on 16 April 2023. An All Stars version with past contestants was also announced to be aired after the third season.

Drag Race España is the seventh international adaptation of the American reality competition series RuPaul's Drag Race, following Chilean, Thai, British, Canadian, Dutch, and Australian and New Zealand versions. It has been followed by Italian, French, Filipino, Belgian, Swedish, Mexican, Brazilian, and German iterations.

The winner of the first season of Drag Race España was Carmen Farala. The winner of the second season of Drag Race España was Sharonne. The winner of the third season of Drag Race España was Pitita. The winner of the fourth season was Le Cocó. The winner of the fifth season was Satín Greco.

== Production ==
The program is produced by World of Wonder and Atresmedia in collaboration with Buendía Estudios. It premiered in May 2021 through the Atresplayer Premium payment platform, while internationally it is broadcast via streaming on WOW Presents Plus. On 30 December 2020, the opening of the selection process for the participants was announced. The main judges: Ana Locking, Javier Ambrossi and Javier Calvo and the main presenter Supremme de Luxe were announced in March 2021, while the ten contestants were announced on 26 April 2021. Two days later, Michelle Visage made the official presentation of the contestants and announced that the program would premiere in May of that same year.

Casting occurred in early 2021 with filming starting by early March 2021. In Spain, the show is carried by ATRESplayer Premium. In the United States, the United Kingdom, and other international territories, the series premiered on WOW Presents Plus, the streaming service of RuPaul's Drag Race production company World of Wonder, concurrently with its Spanish debut. It is the seventh international version of the Drag Race franchise, after The Switch Drag Race, Drag Race Thailand, RuPaul's Drag Race UK, Canada's Drag Race, Drag Race Holland and RuPaul's Drag Race Down Under. On 31 August 2021, it was announced that Atresmedia renewed the series for a second season.

== Judging panel ==
On 15 February 2021, it was confirmed that the show would be hosted by Spanish drag queen Supremme de Luxe. On 1 March 2021, it was announced that the judges panel would include fashion designer Ana Locking, and film and television actors, directors and writers Javier Ambrossi and Javier Calvo.

Judges on Drag Race España
Judge	Season					
Judge	1	2	3	4	5	6
Supremme de Luxe	Main	Main	Main	Main	Main	Main
Ana Locking	Main	Main	Main	Main	Main	Main
Javier Ambrossi	Main	Main	Main	Main	Main	Main
Javier Calvo	Main	Main	Main	Main	Main	Main

== Series overview ==
Season	Contestants	Episodes	Originally released		Winner	Runner(s)-up	Miss Congeniality
Season	Contestants	Episodes	First released	Last released	Winner	Runner(s)-up	Miss Congeniality
1	10	9	30 May 2021	25 July 2021	Carmen Farala	Killer Queen; Sagittaria	Pupi Poisson
2	12	11	27 March 2022	5 June 2022	Sharonne	Estrella Xtravaganza; Venedita Von Däsh	Samantha Ballentines
3	13	11	16 April 2023	25 June 2023	Pitita	Vania Vainilla	María Edilia
4	12	12	22 September 2024	15 December 2024	Le Cocó	La Bella Vampi (Note: La Bella Vampi is known as Vampirashian until the season finale.)	Dita Dubois
5	12	11	28 September 2025	7 December 2025	Satín Greco	Margarita Kalifata	Nori
6	12	TBA	27 September 2026	2026	TBA	TBA	TBA

== Episodes ==
=== Season 1 (2021) ===
The first season of Drag Race España began airing on 30 May 2021 on ATRESplayer Premium in Spain and World of Wonder's streaming service WOW Presents Plus internationally. The season ran for 9 episodes and concluded on 25 July 2021. Carmen Farala, Killer Queen, and Sagittaria made the final, and Carmen Farala was the winner of the first season.

=== Season 2 (2022) ===
On 31 August 2021, it was announced that Atresmedia renewed the series for a second season. A trailer for the second season was posted via social media on 13 January 2022. It premiered on 27 March 2022. The season ran for 11 episodes and concluded on 5 June 2022. Estrella Xtravaganza, Marina, Sharonne, and Venedita Von Däsh made the final, with Sharonne winning the title of Spain's Next Drag Superstar.

=== Season 3 (2023) ===
Production of a third season was announced, with casting opening in September 2022. A trailer for the third season was posted via social media on 19 March 2023. It premiered on 16 April 2023. The season ran for 11 episodes and concluded on 25 June 2023. Hornella Góngora, Kelly Roller, Pitita, and Vania Vainilla made the final, with Pitita winning the title of Spain's Next Drag Superstar.

=== Season 4 (2024) ===
Casting for the fourth season opened in August 2023. The new season premiered on 22 September 2024.

=== Season 5 (2025) ===
Season 5 for España was announced on the show's official Instagram page on 22 March 2024. Casting began on 13 May 2024. The season premiered on 28 September 2025.

=== Season 6 (2026) ===
A 6th season was confirmed on 31 October 2025, with casting starting three days later, on 3 November. On 20 July 2026, it was announced that the Meet the Queens will premiere in September 2026.

== Contestants ==
There have been a total of 46 contestants featured on Drag Race España.

== Spin-off ==
In September 2022, Atresmedia announced that Drag Race España All Stars was in production. The series, which will be the first international version of the RuPaul's Drag Race All Stars format, is scheduled to air following season 3. The cast was confirmed in January 2024.
