= Spain in the Eurovision Song Contest 2024 =

- Eurovision Song Contest 2024
- Participating broadcaster: Radiotelevisión Española (RTVE)
- Country: Spain
- Selection process: Benidorm Fest 2024
- Selection date: 3 February 2024

Competing entry
- Song: "Zorra"
- Artist: Nebulossa
- Songwriters: María Bas; Mark Dasousa

Placement
- Final result: 22nd, 30 points

Participation chronology

Spain was represented at the Eurovision Song Contest 2024 with the song "Zorra", written by María Bas and Mark Dasousa, and performed by themselves under their stage name Nebulossa. The Spanish participating broadcaster, Radiotelevisión Española (RTVE), together with the Generalitat Valenciana, organised Benidorm Fest 2024 in order to select its entry for the contest.

As a member of the "Big Five", Spain directly qualified to compete in the final of the Eurovision Song Contest. Performing in position 8, Spain placed twenty-second out of the 25 performing countries with 30 points.

== Background ==
Prior to the 2024 contest, Televisión Española (TVE) until 2006, and Radiotelevisión Española (RTVE) since 2007, had participated in the Eurovision Song Contest representing Spain sixty-two times since TVE's first entry in 1961. They have won the contest on two occasions: in 1968 with the song "La, la, la" performed by Massiel and in 1969 with the song "Vivo cantando" performed by Salomé, the latter having won in a four-way tie with France, the Netherlands, and the United Kingdom. They have also finished second four times, with "En un mundo nuevo" by Karina in 1971, "Eres tú" by Mocedades in 1973, "Su canción" by Betty Missiego in 1979, and "Vuelve conmigo" by Anabel Conde in 1995. In 2022, RTVE placed third with the song "SloMo" performed by Chanel, while in 2023, it came 17th with the song "Eaea" performed by Blanca Paloma.

As part of its duties as participating broadcaster, RTVE organises the selection of its entry in the Eurovision Song Contest and broadcasts the event in the country. The Spanish broadcaster has selected its entry for the Eurovision Song Contest through both national finals and internal selections in the past, with the national final Benidorm Fest being used since 2022. RTVE confirmed its intentions to participate at the 2024 contest on 11 May 2023, while the 2023 contest was still ongoing, announcing the organisation of the third edition of Benidorm Fest in order to select its next entry.

== Before Eurovision ==
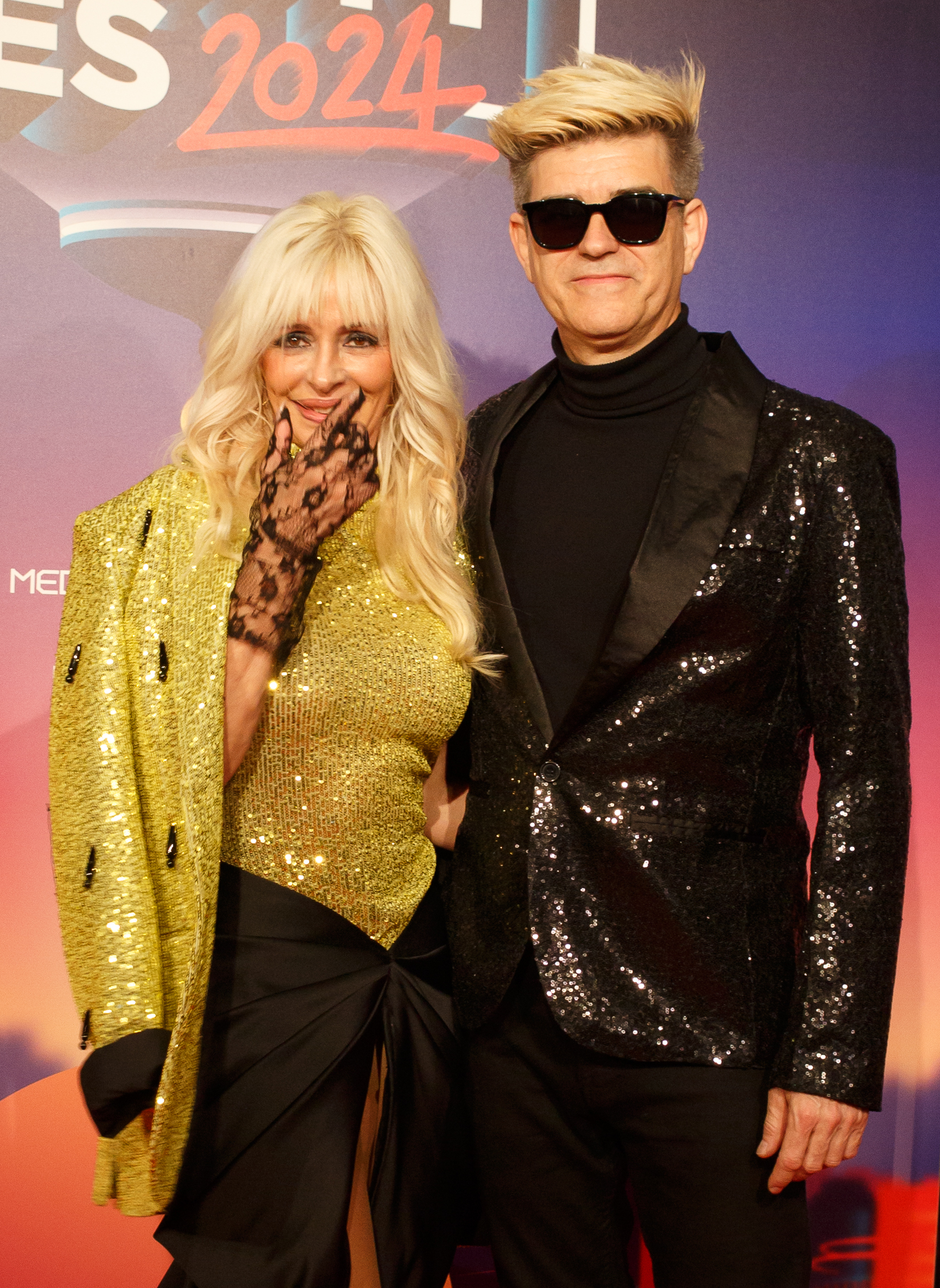
Nebulossa, winners of Benidorm Fest 2024, at the PrePartyES event in Madrid

=== Benidorm Fest 2024 ===
Benidorm Fest 2024 was the third edition of Benidorm Fest, organised by RTVE and Generalitat Valenciana to select the Spanish entry for the Eurovision Song Contest 2024. The event took place at the Palau Municipal d'Esports l'Illa de Benidorm in Benidorm, Valencian Community. Sixteen artists and songs competed over three shows: two semi-finals on 30 January and 1 February 2024, and the final on 3 February 2024, with a total of eight entries ultimately qualifying to the final.

The voting consisted of televote (25%), a demoscopic panel of judges made up of a sample of the Spanish population selected by statistical and demoscopic criteria (25%), and a national and international jury vote (50%).

==== Semi-finals ====
- The first semi-final took place on 31 January 2023. "Zorra" performed by Nebulossa, "Sé quién soy" performed by Angy Fernández, "Here to Stay" performed by Sofia Coll and "Bla bla bla" performed by Miss Caffeina advanced to the final, while "Me vas a ver" performed by Mantra, "Te echo de -" performed by Noan, "Astronauta" performed by Lérica and "Prisionero" performed by Quique Niza were eliminated.
- The second semi-final took place on 2 February 2023. "Dos extraños (Cuarteto de cuerda)" performed by St. Pedro, "Remitente" performed by María Peláe, "Caliente" performed by Jorge González and "Brillos platino" performed by Almácor advanced to the final, while "El temps" performed by Roger Padrós, "Amor de verano" performed by Marlena, "No se me olvida" performed by Yoly Saa and "Beso en la mañana" performed by Dellacruz were eliminated.

==== Final ====
The final took place on 3 February 2024 and saw eight contestants, four having qualified from each semi-final.

Final – 3 February 2024
R/O	Artist	Song	Expert jury	Demoscopic jury	Televote	Total	Place
1	María Peláe	"Remitente"	41	25	20	86	6
2	St. Pedro	"Dos extraños (Cuarteto de cuerda)"	86	28	25	139	2
3	Angy Fernández	"Sé quién soy"	63	35	30	128	3
4	Jorge González	"Caliente"	49	40	35	124	4
5	Nebulossa	"Zorra"	86	30	40	156	1
6	Sofia Coll	"Here to Stay"	29	22	22	73	7
7	Miss Caffeina	"Bla bla bla"	27	16	16	59	8
8	Almácor	"Brillos platino"	51	20	28	99	5

=== Promotion ===
As part of the promotion of their participation in the contest, Nebulossa embarked on a trip across the United States in February 2024; they additionally attended the PrePartyES in Madrid on 30 March 2024, the Euro Fest Gala in Madrid on 3 April 2024, the Barcelona Eurovision Party on 6 April 2024, the London Eurovision Party on 7 April 2024, the Eurovision in Concert event in Amsterdam on 13 April 2024, and the Nordic Eurovision Party in Stockholm on 14 April 2024 as well as performing at the Swedish embassy in Madrid on 10 April 2024 and at the Muccassassina club night in Rome on 26 April 2024. The duo also performed at a public "farewell party" at Teatro Albéniz in Madrid on 22 April 2024, organised by RTVE and available on its online platform RTVE Play.

== At Eurovision ==
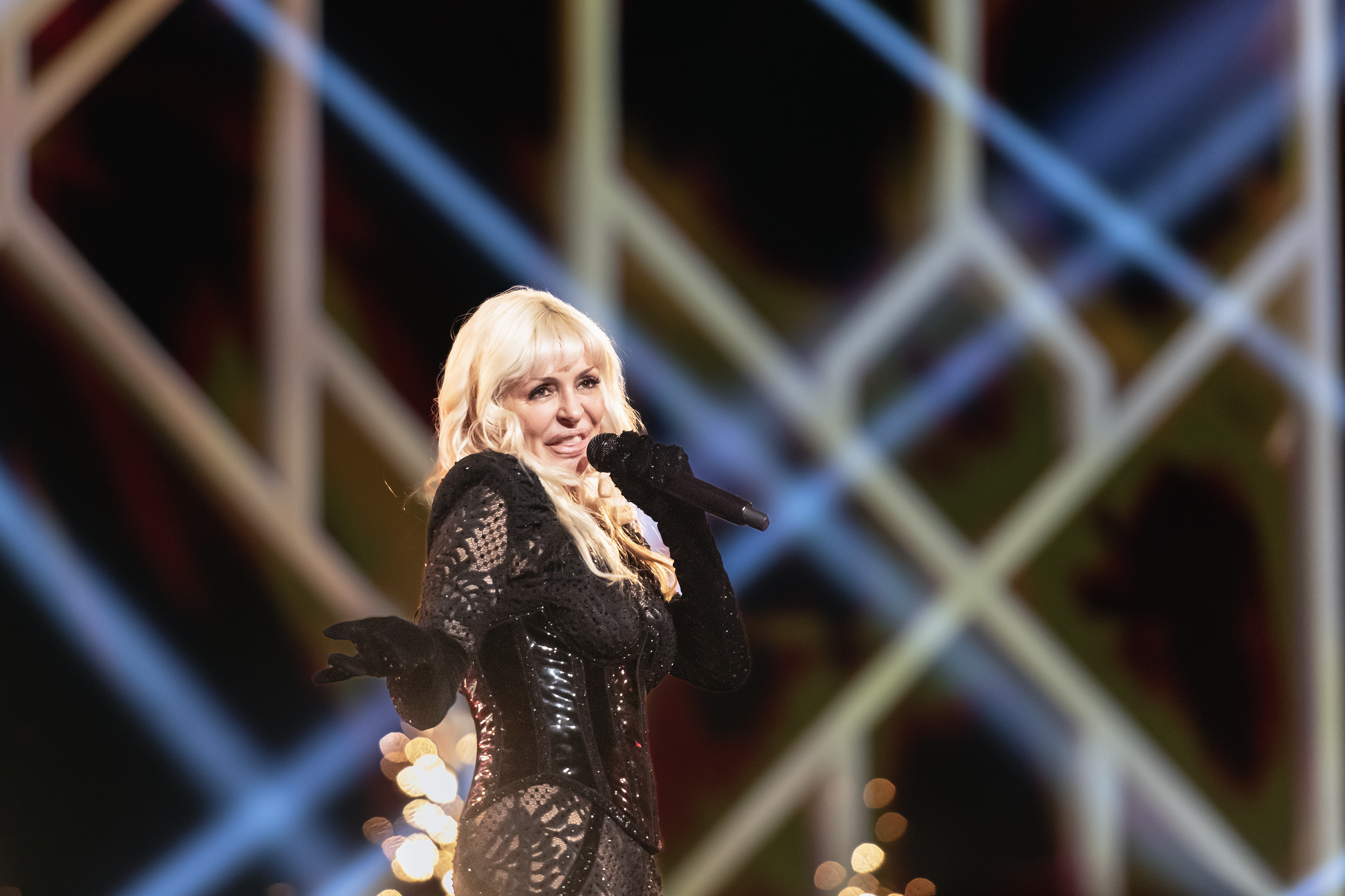
Nebulossa during a rehearsal before the final.

The Eurovision Song Contest 2024 took place at the Malmö Arena in Malmö, Sweden, and consisted of two semi-finals held on the respective dates of 7 and 9 May and the final on 11 May 2024. All nations with the exceptions of the host country and the "Big Five" (France, Germany, Italy, Spain and the United Kingdom) were required to qualify from one of two semi-finals in order to compete in the final; the top ten countries from each semi-final progressed to the final. As a member of the "Big Five", Spain automatically qualifies to compete in the final on 11 May 2024, but is also required to broadcast and vote in one of the two semi-finals. This was decided via a draw held during the semi-final allocation draw on 30 January 2024, when it was announced that Spain would be voting in the second semi-final. Despite being an automatic qualifier for the final, the Spanish entry was also performed during the semi-final. On 4 May 2024, a draw was held to determine which half of the final each "Big Five" country would perform in; Spain drew "producer's choice", meaning that the country would perform in the half decided by the contest's producers.

In Spain, TVE broadcast the first semi-final of the contest on La 2 and the second semi-final and the final on La 1 and its 4K UHD simulcast channel La 1 UHD; in addition, Radio Nacional de España (RNE) aired the final on Radio Nacional nationwide and on Ràdio 4 in Catalonia; with all the shows also broadcast internationally on TVE Internacional, and both television and radio broadcasts available online via RTVE Play. Julia Varela and Tony Aguilar provide the Spanish-language commentary for the television broadcast, and David Asensio, Sara Calvo, Ángela Fernández, Manu Martín-Albo, and Luis Miguel Montes commentated the final on the national radio broadcast. In addition, and for the first time, Catalan-language dual commentary by Sònia Urbano and Xavi Martínez was available for the final on La 1 in Catalonia, which was also aired on Ràdio 4. As part of the Eurovision programming, the special broadcast Estoy en un buen momento: Malmö Calling, hosted by Carolina Iglesias, preceded each of the three shows, and the documentary Catalunya, 12 punts, dedicated to Catalan representatives of Spain at the contest, aired on La 2 before the final.

A public event, organised by RTVE, was held on the day of the final in Benidorm, featuring a live screening of the show at the Auditorio Julio Iglesias as well as performances by special guests and other activities.

=== Performance ===
Nebulossa took part in technical rehearsals on 2 and 4 May, followed by dress rehearsals on 10 and 11 May. Their performance of "Zorra" at the contest is staged by Israel Reyes and Juan Sebastián Domínguez, and choreographed by Vero Mejías, with backing singer Carmen Díaz and dancers César Louzán Ferrío and Iosu Martínez joining the duo on stage. Michael Costello designed singer Mery Bas' costume, which is centred around a black vinyl corset with rhinestones, meant to evoke a dominatrix; Domínguez created the rest of the outfits, which include suits for the dancers, removed at one point to reveal high boots and also a corset underneath. The staging features a sofa and lamps, meant to recreate a "cabaret atmosphere", as well as the usage of smoke at the beginning and pyrotechnics at the end. Visuals include the image of the Venus de Milo, representing the epitome of classical feminity; a red lock, symbolising the passage to a liberated society; and a LED background inspired by the setting of the 1927 film Metropolis, said to give the staging a "retro-futuristic look" and to be a reference to the city of Benidorm.

=== Final ===
On 4 May 2024, a draw was held to determine which half of the final each "Big Five" country would perform in; Spain drew "producer's choice", meaning that the country will perform in the half decided by the contest's producers. Spain will perform in position 8, following the entry from Lithuania and before the entry from Estonia. Nebulossa once again took part in dress rehearsals on 10 and 11 May before the final, including the jury final where the professional juries cast their final votes before the live show on 11 May. They performed a repeat of their semi-final performance during the final on 11 May. Spain placed twenty-second in the final, scoring 30 points; 11 points from the public televoting and 19 points from the juries.

=== Voting ===
Below is a breakdown of points awarded to and by Spain in the second semi-final and in the final. Voting during the three shows involved each country awarding sets of points from 1-8, 10 and 12: one from their professional jury and the other from televoting in the final vote, while the semi-final vote was based entirely on the vote of the public. The Spanish jury consisted of Irene Garrido Pascual, Juan Manuel Pinzás Sueiro, Rosa María Comín, St. Pedro, and Gema del Valle de la Cruz. In the final, Spain placed 22nd with 30 points. Over the course of the contest, Spain awarded its 12 points to Israel in the second semi-final, and to Switzerland (jury) and Israel (televote) in the final.

RTVE appointed Soraya Arnelas, who represented Spain in the 2009 contest, as its spokesperson to announce the Spanish jury's votes in the final.

==== Points awarded to Spain ====
Points awarded to Spain (Final)
Score	Televote	Jury
12 points		
10 points		
8 points		
7 points		Italy
6 points		San Marino
5 points		
4 points		Austria
3 points	Finland; Portugal	
2 points	France; Ireland	
1 point	Italy	Finland; Switzerland

==== Points awarded by Spain ====
Points awarded by Spain (Semi-final 2)
Score	Televote
12 points	Israel
10 points	San Marino
8 points	Netherlands
7 points	Armenia
6 points	Latvia
5 points	Greece
4 points	Switzerland
3 points	Austria
2 points	Czechia
1 point	Georgia

Points awarded by Spain (Final)
Score	Televote	Jury
12 points	Israel	Switzerland
10 points	Ukraine	Ireland
8 points	Croatia	Sweden
7 points	Ireland	France
6 points	Switzerland	Austria
5 points	France	Germany
4 points	Italy	Latvia
3 points	Armenia	Portugal
2 points	Greece	United Kingdom
1 point	Lithuania	Italy

==== Detailed voting results ====
Each participating broadcaster assembles a five-member jury panel consisting of music industry professionals who are citizens of the country they represent. Each jury, and individual jury member, is required to meet a strict set of criteria regarding professional background, as well as diversity in gender and age. No member of a national jury was permitted to be related in any way to any of the competing acts in such a way that they cannot vote impartially and independently. The individual rankings of each jury member as well as the nation's televoting results were released shortly after the grand final.

The following members comprised the Spanish jury:

- Irene Garrido Pascual
- Pedro Hernández Herrera (St. Pedro)
- Juan Manuel Pinzás Sueiro
- Rosa María Comín
- Gema del Valle de la Cruz

Detailed voting results from Spain (Semi-final 2)
R/O	Country	Televote	
R/O	Country	Rank	Points
01	Malta	14	
02	Albania	16	
03	Greece	6	5
04	Switzerland	7	4
05	Czechia	9	2
06	Austria	8	3
07	Denmark	15	
08	Armenia	4	7
09	Latvia	5	6
10	San Marino	2	10
11	Georgia	10	1
12	Belgium	12	
13	Estonia	11	
14	Israel	1	12
15	Norway	13	
16	Netherlands	3	8

Detailed voting results from Spain (Final)
R/O	Country	Jury							Televote	
R/O	Country	Juror A	Juror B	Juror C	Juror D	Juror E	Rank	Points	Rank	Points
01	Sweden	16	3	5	1	21	3	8	18	
02	Ukraine	12	12	20	24	19	22		2	10
03	Germany	2	15	12	16	3	6	5	19	
04	Luxembourg	7	11	15	20	9	14		14	
~~05~~	~~Netherlands~~ ‡ (Note: The Netherlands was disqualified prior to the final.)	~~19~~	~~23~~	~~19~~	~~11~~	~~5~~	~~16~~		N/A	
06	Israel	3	25	21	25	25	15		1	12
07	Lithuania	21	18	8	5	16	13		10	1
08	Spain									
09	Estonia	25	24	25	22	15	24		21	
10	Ireland	11	4	4	3	2	2	10	4	7
11	Latvia	1	19	7	17	7	7	4	15	
12	Greece	17	14	22	12	17	21		9	2
13	United Kingdom	13	10	9	4	8	9	2	16	
14	Norway	24	17	23	21	24	25		22	
15	Italy	10	8	6	10	10	10	1	7	4
16	Serbia	15	20	14	14	14	20		23	
17	Finland	22	2	24	15	11	11		12	
18	Portugal	14	21	3	7	6	8	3	11	
19	Armenia	20	7	18	9	22	18		8	3
20	Cyprus	9	6	11	8	23	12		20	
21	Switzerland	5	5	1	2	1	1	12	5	6
22	Slovenia	23	13	16	19	13	23		24	
23	Croatia	18	9	10	23	20	19		3	8
24	Georgia	6	16	17	18	12	17		17	
25	France	4	22	2	13	4	4	7	6	5
26	Austria	8	1	13	6	18	5	6	13	
