= Drag Race España season 5 =

Fifth season of 'Drag Race España'

Drag Race España
- Season 5
- Promotional poster for season five
- Hosted by: Supremme de Luxe
- Judges: Supremme de Luxe; Ana Locking; Javier Ambrossi; Javier Calvo
- No. of contestants: 12
- Winner: Satín Greco
- Runner-up: Margarita Kalifata
- Miss Congeniality: Nori
- No. of episodes: 11

Release
- Original network: ATRESplayer Premium (Spain); WOW Presents Plus (International)
- Original release: 28 September – 7 December 2025

Season chronology
- ← Previous; Season 4 Next → Season 6

The fifth season of Drag Race España premiered on 28 September 2025, on ATRESplayer Premium in Spain and on WOW Presents Plus internationally.

== Production ==
On 13 March 2024, shortly before the finale of Drag Race España All Stars, it was announced via the show's social media pages that casting for the fifth season was now open.

On 17 July 2025, it was confirmed that the season will air starting in September. On 1 August 2025, promotional videos were released showcasing the contestants (without showing their faces), announcing the full cast reveal date as 7 September.

This season of Drag Race España is notable for increasing the franchise's cash prize to €50,000.

== Contestants ==
Ages, names, and cities stated are at time of filming.

Contestants of Drag Race España season 5 and their backgrounds
Contestant	Age	Hometown	Outcome
Satín Greco	39	Torremolinos, Andalusia	Winner
Margarita Kalifata	32	Córdoba, Andalusia	Runner-up
Laca Udilla	27	Valencia, Valencian Community	3rd place
Nix	29	Copenhagen, Denmark	3rd place
Dafne Mugler	20	Málaga, Andalusia	5th place
Alexandra del Raval	27	Barcelona, Catalonia	6th place
Ferrxn	27	Valencia, Valencian Community	7th place
Denébola Murnau	23	Alicante, Valencian Community	8th place
Krystal Forever	52	Caracas, Venezuela	9th place
La Escándalo	26	Barcelona, Catalonia	10th place
Eva Harrington	27	Tenerife, Canary Islands	10th place
Nori	28	Badajoz, Extremadura	12th place (Note: Nori was voted Miss Congeniality by fellow contestants.)

== Contestant progress ==
Legend:

Satín Greco won Drag Race España season 5.
Margarita Kalifata was the runner-up.
Nori was voted Miss Congeniality (Miss C) by fellow contestants.
Ferrxn won Miss Lost Look (MLL) for having the best unaired look of the season.
Alexandra del Raval won Miss Make-Up (MMU) for having the best makeup of the season.
WIN indicates that the contestant won the challenge.
TOP2 indicates that the contestant was one of the best performing in the challenge, but lost the lip sync to win it.
SAFE indicates that the contestant was declared safe by the judges.
HRT (Heart) indicates that the contestant either saved themself or was saved from the bottom thanks to the power of the two-pieced Heart.
BTM (Bottom) indicates that the contestant was up for elimination.
ELIM (Eliminated) indicates that the contestant was eliminated.
Guest indicates that the contestant returned as a guest.

Contestants progress with placements in each episode
Contestant	Episode										
Contestant	1	2	3	4	5	6	7	8	9	10	11
Satín Greco	TOP2	SAFE	BTM	SAFE	WIN	SAFE	WIN	SAFE	SAFE	Guest	Winner
Margarita Kalifata	SAFE	WIN	BTM	SAFE	SAFE	SAFE	SAFE	WIN	BTM	Guest	Runner-up
Laca Udilla	SAFE	SAFE	SAFE	WIN	SAFE	SAFE	HRT	SAFE	WIN	Guest	Eliminated
Nix	SAFE	SAFE	SAFE	BTM	HRT	WIN	SAFE	HRT	SAFE	Guest	Eliminated
Dafne Mugler	WIN	SAFE	SAFE	SAFE	SAFE	SAFE	SAFE	BTM	ELIM	Guest	Guest
Alexandra del Raval	SAFE	SAFE	SAFE	SAFE	BTM	BTM	BTM	ELIM		MMU	Guest
Ferrxn	SAFE	SAFE	HRT	SAFE	SAFE	SAFE	ELIM	Guest		MLL	Guest
Denébola Murnau	SAFE	SAFE	WIN	SAFE	SAFE	ELIM		Guest		Guest	Guest
Krystal Forever	SAFE	BTM	SAFE	SAFE	ELIM			Guest		Guest	Guest
La Escándalo	SAFE	SAFE	SAFE	ELIM				Guest		Guest	Guest
Eva Harrington	SAFE	SAFE	SAFE	ELIM				Guest		Guest	Guest
Nori	SAFE	ELIM						Guest		Miss C	Guest

== Lip syncs ==
Legend:

The contestant won the lip sync to win the challenge.
The contestant was eliminated after their first time in the bottom.
The contestant was eliminated after their second time in the bottom.
The contestant was eliminated after their fourth time in the bottom.
The contestant won the first round of the Lip Sync Smackdown for the Crown.
The contestant won the second round of the Lip Sync Smackdown for the Crown and was declared the winner of the season.

Episode	Top contestants			Song	Winner
1	Dafne Mugler	vs.	Satín Greco	"Corazón contento" (Marisol)	Dafne Mugler
Episode	Bottom contestants			Song	Eliminated
2	Krystal Forever	vs.	Nori	"Zorra" (Nebulossa)	Nori
3	Margarita Kalifata	vs.	Satín Greco	"Una estrella en mi jardín" (Mari Trini)	None
4	La Escándalo vs. Eva Harrington vs. Nix			"Duro de pelar ("Oh No" Special Edition)" (Rebeca)	La Escándalo
4	La Escándalo vs. Eva Harrington vs. Nix			"Duro de pelar ("Oh No" Special Edition)" (Rebeca)	Eva Harrington
5	Alexandra del Raval	vs.	Krystal Forever	"El hombre del piano" (Ana Belén)	Krystal Forever
6	Alexandra del Raval	vs.	Denébola Murnau	"Yo tengo un novio" (Lola Índigo, La Zowi)	Denébola Murnau
7	Alexandra del Raval	vs.	Ferrxn	"KITT y los coches del pasado" (Ladilla Rusa)	Ferrxn
8	Alexandra del Raval	vs.	Dafne Mugler	"La Original" (Emilia, Tini)	Alexandra del Raval
9	Dafne Mugler	vs.	Margarita Kalifata	"Quédate conmigo" (Pastora Soler)	Dafne Mugler
Episode	Final Contestants			Song	Winner
11	Margarita Kalifata	vs.	Nix	"Hijo de la luna" (Mecano)	Margarita Kalifata
11	Laca Udilla	vs.	Satín Greco	"Otro amor vendrá" (Lara Fabian)	Satín Greco
11	Margarita Kalifata	vs.	Satín Greco	"Déjala correr" (Rocío Jurado)	Satín Greco

== Two-pieced Heart ==
Legend:

The contestant possessed two heart halves and was able to save one of the bottom three queens.
The contestant either saved themself or was saved from the bottom.

Episode	Eliminated gifter	Receiver	Bottom Queens	Saved
3	Nori	Satín Greco	Ferrxn, Margarita Kalifata and Satín Greco	Ferrxn
5	Eva Harrington	Margarita Kalifata (Note: Since there was a double elimination on episode 4, both queens had to agree together on who to give the whole heart to instead of giving their two halves separate.)	Alexandra del Raval, Krystal Forever and Nix	Nix
5	La Escándalo	Margarita Kalifata	Alexandra del Raval, Krystal Forever and Nix	Nix
6	Krystal Forever	Satín Greco	Alexandra del Raval, Denébola Murnau and Laca Udilla	None (Note: Since Satín Greco already used her first half of a heart in a previous episode, the power rolled back to the judges' hands.)
7	Denébola Murnau	Laca Udilla	Alexandra del Raval, Ferrxn and Laca Udilla	Laca Udilla
8	Ferrxn	Satín Greco	Alexandra del Raval, Dafne Mugler and Nix	Nix

== Guest judges ==
Listed in chronological order:

- Amaia Romero, singer and actress
- Yolanda Ramos, actress and comedian
- Rossy de Palma, actress and model
- Rebeca, singer
- Brays Efe, actor and television personality
- La Dani, singer, actor and hairdresser
- Abril Zamora, actress, screenwriter and director
- Martita de Graná, actress and comedian
- Pastora Soler, singer

=== Special guests ===
Guests who appeared in episodes, but did not judge on the main stage.

Episode 4:

- Pablo Cruz, music producer
- Laura Doray, sound technician

Episode 5:

- Yenesi, singer and drag performer

Episode 6:

- Carmelo Segura, artistic director

Episode 7:

- Pupi Poisson, contestant on Drag Race España season 1 and Drag Race España All Stars season 1
- Hornella Góngora, contestant on Drag Race España season 3 and Drag Race España All Stars season 1
- Shani LaSanta, contestant on Drag Race España season 4

Episode 10:

- Dita Dubois, contestant and Miss Congeniality on Drag Race España season 4

== Episodes ==
No. overall	No. in series	Title	Original release date
44	1	"My Heart Is Rejoicing" "Tengo el corazón contento"	28 September 2025
Guest Judge: Amaia; Main Challenge: Perform in a talent show; Runway Theme: Mis Dos Caras (My Two Faces); Challenge Winner: Dafne Mugler and Satín Greco; Lip-Sync Song: "Corazón contento" by Marisol; Eliminated: None
45	2	"The Secret of Boner Bridge" "El secreto de Puente Tieso"	5 October 2025
Guest Judge: Yolanda Ramos; Mini Challenge: In pairs, one queen tells a dramatic backstory while the other feeds them ice cream without seeing their face; Mini Challenge Winners: Ferrxn and La Escándalo; Main Challenge: Act in a parody of the soap opera El secreto de Puente Viejo; Runway Theme: Javivisión (Javi-vision); Challenge Winner: Margarita Kalifata; Bottom Two: Krystal Forever and Nori; Lip-Sync Song: "Zorra" by Nebulossa; Eliminated: Nori
46	3	"Red and Rossy Carpet" "La alfombra Rossy"	12 October 2025
Guest Judge: Rossy de Palma; Main Challenge: Showcase two looks including one made in the workroom; Runway Themes: De Alfombra Roja (Red Carpet) and De Alfombra Rossy (Rossy Carpet); Challenge Winner: Denébola Murnau; Bottom Two: Margarita Kalifata and Satín Greco; Lip-Sync Song: "Una estrella en mi jardín" by Mari Trini; Eliminated: None
47	4	"Manifest, The Festival" "Manifest"	19 October 2025
Guest Judge: Rebeca; Mini Challenge: Be the first to shake all the balls out of a box tied to their backside; Mini Challenge Winner: Laca Udilla; Main Challenge: In groups, write, record, and perform verses to "Match Travesti", "Hater" and "Un mundo sin armarios"; Runway Theme: Disfrutonas; Challenge Winner: Laca Udilla; Bottom Three: Eva Harrington, La Escándalo, and Nix; Lip-Sync Song: "Duro de pelar ("Oh No" Special Edition)" by Rebeca; Eliminated: Eva Harrington and La Escándalo
48	5	"Snatch and Serve" "Snatch Game"	26 October 2025
Guest Judge: Brays Efe; Mini Challenge: Reading is Fundamental; Mini Challenge Winner: Ferrxn; Main Challenge: Snatch Game; Runway Theme: Al Tul Tul; Challenge Winner: Satín Greco; Bottom Two: Alexandra del Raval and Krystal Forever; Lip-Sync Song: "El hombre del piano" by Ana Belén; Eliminated: Krystal Forever
49	6	"The Musical: Vais A Volverme Lorca" "Vais a volverme Lorca"	2 November 2025
Guest Judge: La Dani; Mini Challenge: Paint your face using limited makeup products; Mini Challenge Winner: Dafne Mugler; Main Challenge: Star and perform in the musical "Vais a volverme Lorca"; Runway Theme: Bodas de Sangre; Challenge Winner: Nix; Bottom Two: Alexandra del Raval and Denébola Murnau; Lip-Sync Song: "Yo tengo un novio" by Lola Índigo, La Zowi; Eliminated: Denébola Murnau
50	7	"Dragselling Houses"	9 November 2025
51	8	"The Notary Yasstaria"	16 November 2025
52	9	"Makeover: Queen of My Hometown"	23 November 2025
53	10	"Return of the Queens"	30 November 2025
54	11	"A Heart-Stopping Finale"	7 December 2025
