= Ana Villa =

Spanish journalist and musician

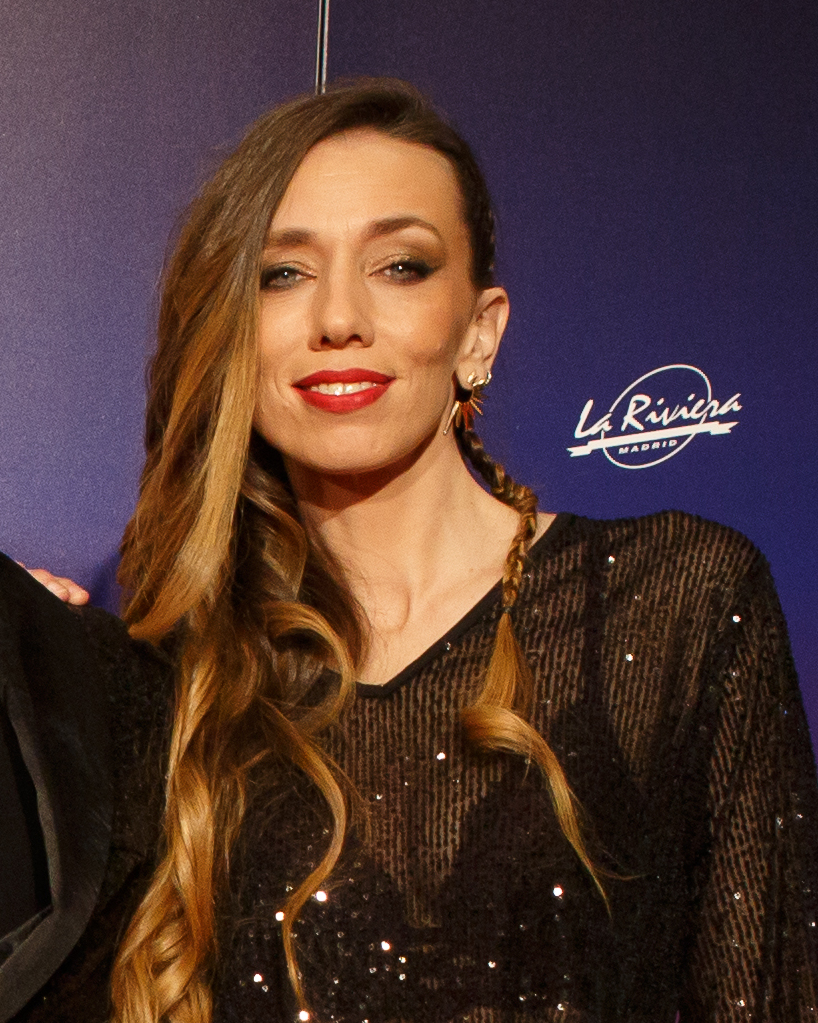
- Ana Villa in 2024
- Occupations: Journalist and musician
- Musical career
- Member of: Nebulossa

Ana Villa is a Spanish journalist and musician. She is part of the group Nebulossa, in which she plays drums.

== Biography ==
Ana Villa is a journalist, and since 2012, she has worked as an editor and social media manager (SMM) of the Teatros Magazine.

As a percussionist, she is the drummer and backing vocalist for the punk-pop group Pantones and drummer for Los Chillers and Monterrosa.

In 2023, she performed with the duo Nebulossa in their presentation at Benidorm Fest 2024, the Spanish selection for the Eurovision Song Contest 2024, with the song "Zorra". They came first in their semifinal on January 30, 2024, qualifying for the final, which they won.

Already in Eurovision 2024, as part of the Spanish delegation, she participated on May 9 at the Malmö Arena in the second semifinal, where she played percussion with luminous drumsticks. During the grand finale, held on May 11, Nebulossa placed eighth, but after the sum of the votes of the specialized jury and the televote, they obtained a total of 30 points, placing 22nd.
