= Drag Race España season 6 =

Sixth season of 'Drag Race España'

Drag Race España
- Season 6
- Promotional poster for season six
- Hosted by: Supremme de Luxe
- Judges: Supremme de Luxe; Ana Locking; Javier Ambrossi; Javier Calvo
- No. of contestants: 12
- No. of episodes: 8

Release
- Original network: ATRESplayer Premium (Spain); WOW Presents Plus (International)
- Original release: 27 September 2026 – present

Season chronology
- ← Previous; Season 5

The sixth season of Drag Race España premiered on 27 September 2026 on Atresplayer in Spain and on WOW Presents Plus worldwide. The cast of the sixth season was revealed on 6 September 2026.

== Contestants ==
Ages, names, and cities stated are at time of filming.

Contestants of Drag Race España season 6 and their backgrounds
Contestant	Age	Hometown	Outcome
Alma DeSoul	35	Málaga, Andalusia	TBA
Buba Anorex	32	Madrid, Community of Madrid	TBA
Kim Miller	22	Vigo, Galicia	TBA
Sorny	31	Madrid, Community of Madrid	TBA
Maitetxu Mia	47	Gipuzkoa, Basque Country	5th place
Coco Luna	32	Margarita Island, Venezuela	6th place
Liak	33	Murcia, Region of Murcia	7th place
Vanessa Artiles	33	Las Palmas, Canary Islands	8th place
Marcus Massalami	35	Valencia, Valencian Community	9th place
Liz Dust	39	Valencia, Valencian Community	10th place
Joan Chevalier	27	Málaga, Andalusia	11th place
Àlex Marteen	35	Barcelona, Catalonia	12th place

== Contestant progress ==
Legend:

WIN indicates that the contestant won the challenge.
SAFE indicates that the contestant was declared safe by the judges.
COIN indicates that the contestant received the Lucky Coin and was saved from the bottom three.
BTM (Bottom) indicates that the contestant was up for elimination.
ELIM (Eliminated) indicates that the contestant was eliminated.
Guest indicates that the contestant returned as a guest.

Contestants progress with placements in each episode
Contestant	Episode									
Contestant	1	2	3	4	5	6	7	8	9	10
Alma DeSoul	SAFE	SAFE	WIN	SAFE	SAFE	SAFE	WIN	SAFE	BTM	TBA
Buba Anorex	SAFE	SAFE	SAFE	SAFE	WIN	WIN	SAFE	SAFE	SAFE	TBA
Kim Miller	SAFE	SAFE	SAFE	SAFE	SAFE	SAFE	SAFE	BTM	WIN	TBA
Sorny	SAFE	SAFE	SAFE	WIN	SAFE	SAFE	SAFE	SAFE	SAFE	TBA
Maitetxu Mia	WIN	SAFE	SAFE	COIN	SAFE	BTM	BTM	WIN	ELIM	
Coco Luna	SAFE	SAFE	SAFE	SAFE	COIN	SAFE	SAFE	ELIM		
Liak	BTM	COIN	BTM	BTM	SAFE	SAFE	ELIM			
Vanessa Artiles	SAFE	SAFE	SAFE	SAFE	BTM	ELIM				
Marcus Massalami	SAFE	SAFE	SAFE	SAFE	ELIM					
Liz Dust	SAFE	BTM	SAFE	ELIM						
Joan Chevalier	BTM	WIN	ELIM							
Àlex Marteen	SAFE	ELIM								

== Lip syncs ==
Legend:

The contestant was eliminated after their first time in the bottom.
The contestant was eliminated after their second time in the bottom.
The contestant was eliminated after their third time in the bottom.
The contestant was eliminated after their fourth time in the bottom.

Episode	Bottom contestants			Song	Eliminated
1	Joan Chevalier	vs.	Liak	"Zakaza" (Chanel)	None
2	Àlex Marteen	vs.	Liz Dust	"El twist del autobús" (Paco Clavel)	Àlex Marteen
3	Joan Chevalier	vs.	Liak	"Qué ganas de no verte nunca más" (Valeria Lynch)	Joan Chevalier
4	Liak	vs.	Liz Dust	"Mojaita" (Lola Índigo)	Liz Dust
5	Marcus Massalami	vs.	Vanessa Artiles	"Nada" (Isabel Pantoja)	Marcus Massalami
6	Maitetxu Mia	vs.	Vanessa Artiles	"Escándalo" (Raphael)	Vanessa Artiles
7	Liak	vs.	Maitetxu Mia	"Las campanas del amor" (Mónica Naranjo)	Liak
8	Coco Luna	vs.	Kim Miller	"Antes muerta que sencilla" (María Isabel)	Coco Luna
9	Alma DeSoul	vs.	Maitetxu Mia	"Salvaje" (Nathy Peluso)	Maitetxu Mia

== Coin Flipping ==
Legend:

This color indicates that the coin flipped on the Cara (Face) side. The safe queens have to choose a contestant from the bottom three to save from the Lip Sync for Your Life.
This color indicates that the coin flipped on the Cruz (Cross) side. The safe queens have to choose a contestant from the bottom three to condemn to the Lip Sync for Your Life.
This color indicates that the vote is coming from the challenge winner. In the event of a tie in the votes, the challenge winner shall break it.
BTM (Bottom) indicates that the contestant was in the bottom three and could not cast a vote.

	Episode								
	1	2	3	4	5 (Note: In this episode, all three bottom queens received two votes, resulting in a tie. In the event of a tie, the challenge winner vote shall break it, with Buba Anorex saving Coco Luna.)	6	7	8	9
Bottom Three	Coco; Joan; Liak	Àlex; Liak; Liz	Coco; Joan; Liak	Liak; Liz; Maitetxu	Coco; Marcus; Vanessa	Liak; Maitetxu; Vanessa	Coco; Liak; Maitetxu	Buba; Coco; Kim	Alma; Maitetxu; Sorny
Votes to	Condemn	Save	Condemn	Save	Save	Condemn	Condemn	Condemn	Condemn
Alma	Joan	Liak	Joan	Maitetxu	Vanessa	Maitetxu	Maitetxu	Kim	BTM
Buba	Joan	Liak	Joan	Maitetxu	Coco	Maitetxu	Maitetxu	BTM	Maitetxu
Kim	Coco	Liz	Joan	Maitetxu	Marcus	Maitetxu	Maitetxu	BTM	Maitetxu
Sorny	Joan	Àlex	Liak	Maitetxu	Coco	Maitetxu	Maitetxu	Kim	BTM
Maitetxu	Joan	Àlex	Joan	BTM	Marcus	BTM	BTM	Kim	BTM
Coco	BTM	Liak	BTM	Maitetxu	BTM	Maitetxu	BTM	BTM	
Liak	BTM	BTM	BTM	BTM	Vanessa	BTM	BTM		
Vanessa	Joan	Liak	Joan	Maitetxu	BTM	BTM			
Marcus	Joan	Liz	Joan	Maitetxu	BTM				
Liz	Joan	BTM	Joan	BTM					
Joan	BTM	Liz	BTM						
Àlex	Joan	BTM							
Result	Joan (8 of 9 votes)	Liak (4 of 9 votes)	Joan (7 of 8 votes)	Maitetxu (7 of 7 votes)	Coco (2 of 6 votes)	Maitetxu (5 of 5 votes)	Maitetxu (4 of 4 votes)	Kim (3 of 3 votes)	Maitetxu (2 of 2 votes)

== Guest judges ==
Listed in chronological order:

- Chanel, singer, dancer and actress
- Paco Clavel, singer, artist and radio host
- Carlos González, actor
- Rafa Méndez, dancer, choreographer, and television personality
- Topacio Fresh, singer, actress, dancer and activist
- Asier Etxeandia, actor and singer
- Alba Carrillo, model and television host
- Magdalenita, internet personality

=== Special guests ===
Guests who appeared in episodes, but did not judge on the main stage.

Episode 3:

- La Yaya Mari Carmen, social media personality

Episode 4:

- Pablo Cruz, music producer
- Laura Doray, sound engineer

Episode 5:

- Le Cocó, winner of Drag Race España season 4
- Megui Yeillow, contestant on Drag Race España season 4

Episode 6:

- Carmelo Segura, artistic director

Episode 7:

- Pupi Poisson, contestant on Drag Race España season 1 and All Stars

== Episodes ==
No. overall	No. in season	Title	Original release date
55	1	"Heads and Tails" "Cara o cruz"	27 September 2026
56	2	"Home-Outfit Battle" "Un ball de andar por casa"	4 October 2026
57	3	"On-Duty Parapharmacy" "Parafarmacia de guardia"	11 October 2026
58	4	"Ñ-Pop"	18 October 2026
59	5	"Snatch and Deliver" "Snatch Game"	25 October 2026
60	6	"The Golden Brick, Tribute To Federico Chueca" "El ladrillo de oro"	1 November 2026
61	7	"Drag New Year's Eve" "Las campanadrags"	8 November 2026
