= Dikélame =

Studio album by Jorge Gonzalez
- Released: 21 June 2007
- Genres: Latin; flamenco-pop; Rumba-catalana; arabic
- Length: 40:39
- Language: Spanish
- Label: Vale Music
- Producers: Jorge Aguilar, Josep Lladó

Jorge Gonzalez chronology
Dikélame (2007)	Vengo a Enamorarte (2010)

Dikélame (English: Look at me) is the debut album by Spanish Romani singer Jorge González, released in the summer of 2007 by Vale Music. Dikélame, Romani language album name. Its lead single “Xikilla baila.” In Spain, the album entered and peaked at number 31 on the Spanish Albums Chart, staying on the chart for a total of 10 weeks.

== Track listing ==
1. Xikilla baila
2. Cada día más loco
3. Hola mi amor
4. Dame veneno
5. Todos me lo dicen
6. Anda que no
7. Mírame
8. Donde esté tu corazón
9. Bailar contigo
10. Ya es tarde
11. Lunas de miel
12. Quiero más y más

== Charts ==
Chart (2007)	Peak position
Spanish Albums Chart	31

== Credits ==
- Josep Lladóp — producer, mixing, programming, piano, keyboards
- Sergi Riera — mixing
- Joan Campanera — assistant engineer
- Mauricio Tonelli — mastering
- Toni Mateos — drums
- Jordi Vericat — bass
- Toto Montoya — percussion, drawer
- Xavier Figuerola — saxophone soprano
- Carles Torregrosa — backing vocals
- Luis Sánchez — backing vocals
- Carlos Muñoz — programming, piano, keyboards
- David Palau — electric guitar
- Jason Heidelmann — electric guitar
- Jordi Bonell — Spanish guitar
- Pedro Javier González — Spanish guitar
- Aurora Salazar — backing vocals
- Lidia Guevara — backing vocals
