= Maitetxu Mia =

Spanish drag performer

- Maitetxu Mia in 2023
- Occupation: Drag performer
- Television: Drag Race España (season 6)

Maitetxu Mia is a Spanish drag performer competing on the sixth season of Drag Race España.
