= Marcus Massalami =

Spanish drag performer and entertainer

Marcus Massalami is the stage name of Melisa Meseguer, a Spanish drag king competing on the sixth season of Drag Race España.

== Career ==
Meseguer is a drag performer whose persona Marcus Massalami "became a way for her to challenge toxic masculinity through performance". Marcus Massalami is competing on the sixth season of Drag Race España. He is the show's first drag king. He is the second drag king to compete in any Drag Race franchise, following Velma Jones on the sixth season of Canada's Drag Race.

== Personal life ==
Meseguer is a lesbian. She is an actress, singer, violinist, and nurse. She is the second cisgender woman to compete on Drag Race España, after Clover Bish.

== See also ==
- List of drag kings
