= Toy Boy (TV series) =

Spanish television series

- Genre: Drama; Thriller
- Created by: César Benítez; Juan Carlos Cueto; Rocío Martínez
- Directed by: Iñaki Mercero; Javier Quintas; Laura M. Campos
- Starring: Jesús Mosquera; Cristina Castaño; María Pedraza
- Opening theme: "Set You Free" by Reyko
- Country of origin: Spain
- Original language: Spanish
- No. of seasons: 2
- No. of episodes: 21

Production
- Production location: Costa del Sol
- Production company: Atresmedia Televisión: Plano a Plano

Original release
- Network: Atresplayer Premium
- Release: 8 September 2019 – 21 November 2021

Toy Boy is a Spanish drama produced by Atresmedia and Plano a Plano. The show stars Jesús Mosquera, Cristina Castaño and María Pedraza. It premiered first on FesTVal and Atresplayer Premium in September 2019 before its premiere on Antena 3 on 25 September 2019.

== Plot ==
The fiction is set in the Costa del Sol. Hugo Beltrán (Jesús Mosquera) is a young, handsome and carefree stripper. One morning he wakes up on a sailboat, after a night of partying and excesses, next to the burned corpse of a man, allegedly the husband of his lover, Macarena Medina (Cristina Castaño), a mature and powerful woman with whom he maintained a steamy high-voltage sexual relationship. Hugo does not remember anything from the night of the crime, but is sure that he is not the murderer, but the victim of a set-up to frame him. After a quick trial, he is sentenced to fifteen years in prison.

Seven years later, he is visited in prison by Triana Marín (María Pedraza), a young lawyer who, representing a major law firm, offers to help him reopen the case and try to prove his innocence in a new trial. Although Hugo distrusts the offer, Triana gets the conviction annulled and Hugo is released from prison, on probation and pending the holding of a new trial in which they will have to be able to prove their innocence.

Triana and Hugo work together to try to unravel a complex plot that took an innocent person to prison. A relationship that will not be easy, since they belong to diametrically opposite worlds; She is a lawyer with a hard-working, responsible and bright future. He, a master of the night, former prisoner and considered a murderer by everyone except himself.

== Cast ==
- Jesús Mosquera as Hugo Beltrán González
- Cristina Castaño as Macarena Medina de Solís
- María Pedraza as Triana Marín
- José de la Torre as Iván
- Carlo Costanzia as Jairo Soto
- Raudel Raúl Martiato as Germán
- Juanjo Almeida as Andrea Norman Medina
- José Manuel Seda as Borja Medina de Solís
- Álex Gadea as Mateo Medina de Solís
- Javier Mora as Ángel Altamira
- Pedro Casablanc as Inspector Mario Zapata
- Elisa Matilla as María Teresa Rojas
- María Pujalte as Carmen de Andrés
- Adelfa Calvo as Doña Benigna Rojas Romero
- Carlos Scholz as Óscar
- Nía Castro as Claudia
- Miriam Díaz-Aroca as Luisa García
- Cinta Ramírez as Lucía
- Virgil Mathet as Philip Norman

Introduced in season 2

- Álex González as Leonardo Giallo, alias "El Turco"
- Federica Sabatini as Rania

== Episodes ==
=== Series overview ===
Series	Episodes	Originally released			Ref.
Series	Episodes	First released	Last released	Network	Ref.
1	13	8 September 2019	1 December 2019	ATRESplayer Premium	
2	8	26 September 2021	21 November 2021	ATRESplayer Premium	

=== Season 1 (2019) ===
No. overall	No. in season	Title	Original release date
1	1	"Piloto" "Pilot"	8 September 2019
2	2	"De entre los muertos" "Among the Dead"	15 September 2019
3	3	"El juicio final" "The Final Judgement"	22 September 2019
4	4	"Casilla de salida" "Square One"	29 September 2019
5	5	"El pulso del asesino" "The Murderer's Pulse"	6 October 2019
6	6	"El final del túnel" "End of the Tunnel"	13 October 2019
7	7	"Juego de máscaras" "Masquerade"	20 October 2019
8	8	"El último testigo" "Sole Witness"	27 October 2019
9	9	"Amor de madre" "Mother's Love"	3 November 2019
10	10	"Polaroids" "Polaroids"	10 November 2019
11	11	"Cachorro" "Young Pup"	17 November 2019
12	12	"Redención" "Redemption"	24 November 2019
13	13	"Ángeles caídos" "Fallen Angels"	1 December 2019

=== Season 2 ===
No. overall	No. in season	Title	Original release date
14	1	"La persona a la que más quieres"	26 September 2021
15	2	"Qué es el sexo para ti?"	3 October 2021
16	3	"El precio de los dioses"	10 October 2021
17	4	"Cielo e infierno"	24 October 2021
18	5	"Templos profanos"	31 October 2021
19	6	"Un gesto de amor"	7 November 2021
20	7	"Por qué me llaman el turco?"	14 November 2021
21	8	"Puertas que se abren"	21 November 2021

== Production and release ==
Created by César Benítez, Juan Carlos Cueto and Rocío Martínez, Toy Boy was produced by Atresmedia Televisión in collaboration with Plano a Plano. Iñaki Mercero and Javier Quintas directed the episodes of the first season. The first season was shot on natural locations of the Costa del Sol: shooting locations included Málaga, Fuengirola, Torremolinos, Mijas, Marbella and Estepona. Filming was wrapped in May 2019. The series premiered on Atresplayer Premium on 8 September 2019, later starting its free-to-air broadcasting run on Antena 3 on 25 September 2019.

Despite mediocre viewership figures in the domestic run on linear television, the series enjoyed a better international reception in Netflix. Thus, in July 2020, Atresmedia and Netflix decided to bring back the series for a second season. Filming started by March 2021 in Vélez-Málaga. In April 2021 Álex González, Federica Sabatini, Enrique Arce, Paco Marín, Ibrahim Al-Shami, Toni Zenet and Juan Betancourt were announced as additions to the cast, with Javier Quintas and Laura M. Campos as directors. Atresplayer Premium set the season 2 premiere date for 26 September 2021.

Season 2 aired on Netflix on 11 February 2022.
