= Jesús Mosquera =

Spanish actor

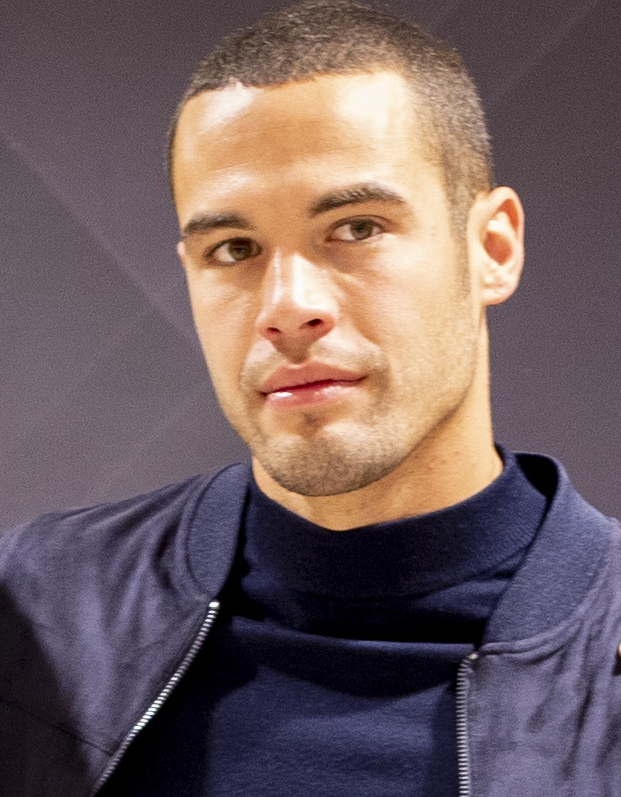
- Mosquera in 2019
- Born: Jesús Mosquera Bernal; 23 February 1993 (age 33); Fuengirola, Province of Málaga, Spain
- Occupations: Actor prev. footballer
- Years active: 2018–present
- Notable work: Toy Boy

Jesús Mosquera Bernal (Spanish pronunciation: [xeˈsus mosˈkeɾa βeɾˈnal]; born 23 February 1993) is a Spanish ex-footballer turned actor, best known for his portrayal of Hugo Beltrán in Toy Boy.

== Career as footballer ==
Born in the southern coastal town of Fuengirola in the province of Málaga, Mosquera played as a central defender and began his career at Málaga CF, at the age of 12. He was in the youth academy of the Andalusian club, making a switch to the other side of Spain to join Athletic Bilbao at the age of 16. At the age of 18, Mosquera returned to Málaga, enrolling in the reserve team of Málaga CF. He also went through Betis B and Antequera, his last clubs before quitting football and turning to acting.

== Career as actor ==
After being discovered at a gym in Málaga, Mosquera auditioned for a small role in his breakout show. The producers saw in him a raw potential for stardom, which led him to being cast as the lead in Toy Boy instead of the bit part.

== Filmography ==
Year	Title	Role	Notes	Ref
2018	Allí abajo	Manu	Episodes 7, 10 and 14 of season 4	
2019	LOS40 Music Awards 2019	Himself	Presenter	
2019	Toy Boy	Hugo Beltrán González	Leading role	
