= Ondara =

Village in Spain

- Municipality
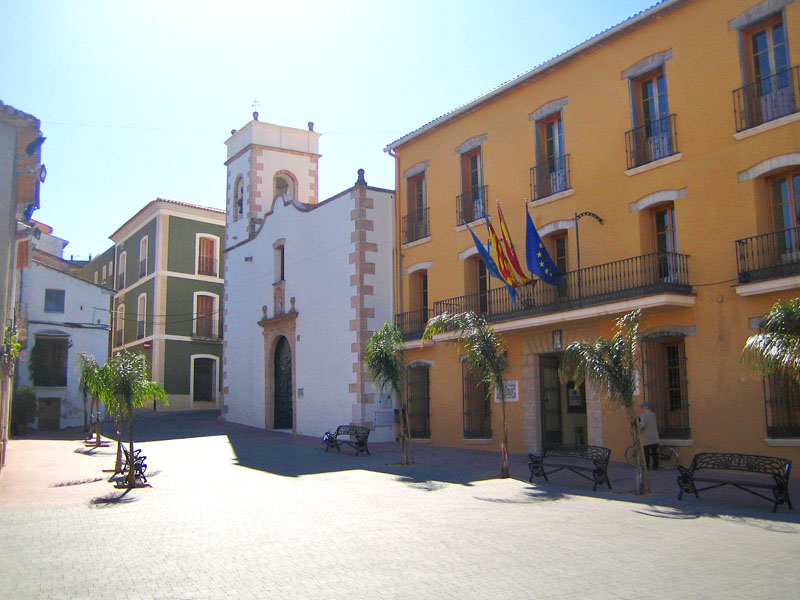
- Convent Square in Ondara

- Flag Coat of arms

- Location within Valencian Community Location within Spain
- Coordinates: 38°49′41″N 00°01′02″E
- Country: Spain
- Autonomous community: Valencian Community
- Province: Alicante
- Comarca: Marina Alta
- Judicial district: Dénia

Government
  - Mayor: José Ramiro Pastor (PSPV-PSOE)

Area
  - Total: 10.41 km^{2} (4.02 sq mi)
- Elevation: 36 m (118 ft)

Population (2023)
  - Total: 7,308
  - Density: 702.0/km^{2} (1,818/sq mi)
- Demonym(s): Valencian: ondarenc (m.), ondarenca (f.); Spanish: ondarense
- Time zone: UTC+1 (CET)
  - Summer (DST): UTC+2 (CEST)
- Postal code: 03760
- Website: www.ondara.org

Ondara is a village and municipality in the province of Alicante, Valencian Community, Spain. It covers an area of 10.41 km^{2} (4.02 sq mi) and as of 2023 had a population of 7,308.

== Notable people ==
- Nebulossa, electropop duo consisting of Mark Dasousa and Mery Bas
