= Benidorm Fest 2024 =

Spanish selection for the Eurovision Song Contest 2024

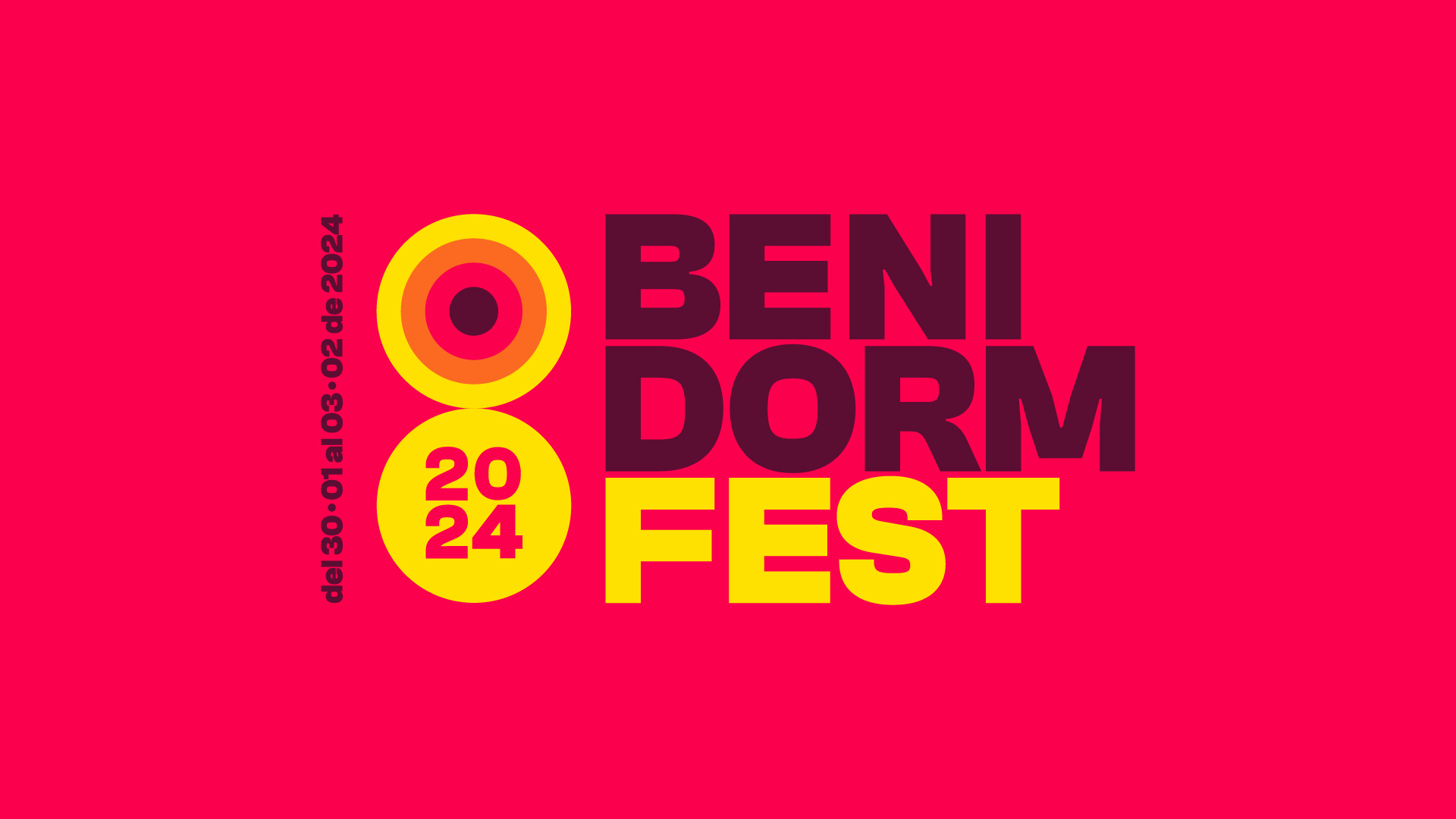

Dates and venue
- Semi-final 1: 30 January 2024
- Semi-final 2: 1 February 2024
- Final: 3 February 2024
- Venue: Palau Municipal d'Esports l'Illa de Benidorm (Benidorm, Valencian Community, Spain)

Organisation
- Broadcaster: Radiotelevisión Española (RTVE)
- Artistic director: Ana María Bordas; César Vallejo
- Executive supervisor: María Eizaguirre
- Presenters: Ruth Lorenzo; Marc Calderó; Ana Prada

Participants
- Number of entries: 16
- Number of finalists: 8

Vote
- Voting system: Professional jury (50%), demoscopic jury (25%) and televote (25%)
- Winning song: "Zorra" by Nebulossa

Benidorm Fest 2024 was the third edition of the annual Benidorm Fest, a television song contest held in Benidorm, organised and broadcast by Radiotelevisión Española (RTVE). The show was held between 30 January and 3 February 2024, and was hosted by Ruth Lorenzo, Marc Calderó, and Ana Prada. The winner, Nebulossa with "Zorra", represented Spain in the Eurovision Song Contest 2024.

== Format ==
The 2024 edition was introduced on 26 July 2023 in the presence of Massiel, the first Spanish representative to win the Eurovision Song Contest in 1968. Further details were announced at a press conference held at the Torrespaña in Madrid on 9 January 2024. An opening gala was held at Benidorm Palace on 28 January 2024, which included performances by Benidorm Fest 2023 winner Blanca Paloma and the Spanish representative at the Junior Eurovision Song Contest 2023, Sandra Valero.

The competition consisted of two semi-finals on 30 January and 1 February 2024, and one final on 3 February 2024. In total, 16 candidate songs competed divided between the two semifinals, that is, eight participated in each one. In each semifinal, the four songs with the most votes among a professional jury (50%), a demoscopic panel (25%) and the televote (25%), qualified to the final. During the final, the eight qualified songs were performed again and the winner was determined following the same voting system as in the semi-finals.

In addition to the televised shows, three Euroclub concerts took place in Benidorm on 30 January, 2 February and 3 February as part of the festival week, featuring performances by previous Benidorm Fest contestants, international artists as well as acts who applied to compete in 2024 but were not selected.

=== Presenters ===
At the January 2024 press conference, Ruth Lorenzo and Marc Calderó were announced as the main hosts of the competition, alongside Ana Prada as the host of the green room. In addition, each show was preceded by an introductory segment, titled Benidorm Calling and hosted by Inés Hernand and Jordi Cruz, and followed by a commentary show, titled La noche del Benidorm and hosted by Hernand and Aitor Albizua.

=== Jury members ===
The jury consisted of four Spanish members and four international members. The Spanish members are singers Carlos Baute, Ángela Carrasco, Guille Milkyway and chair Beatriz Luengo; the international members were Lee Smithurst (head of the British delegation to the contest and show producer of the Eurovision Song Contest 2023), David Tserunyan (head of the Armenian delegation to the contest), Marta Piekarska (head of the Polish delegation to the contest) and Nicoline Refsing (artistic director of the Eurovision Song Contest 2014). Piekarska was selected as a replacement for Twan van de Nieuwenhuijzen (head of the Dutch delegation to the contest and head of contest for the Eurovision Song Contest 2021 to 2023), who was ultimately unable to attend the festival.

=== Guest performers ===
Beret with Mr. Rain and Vicco with Abraham Mateo performed during the first semi-final. Íñigo Quintero and Sergio Dalma performed during the second semi-final. Ruth Lorenzo, Camela and Abraham Mateo performed in the final.

== Competing entries ==
RTVE published the rules and regulations for Benidorm Fest 2024 on 11 May 2023, opening a submission window lasting from 16 May until 10 October 2023. In addition to the open submission, RTVE reserved the right to invite renowned singers and authors from the current music scene. For the 2024 edition, the broadcaster also organised a songwriting camp in September 2023, open to both local and international composers. Upon closing the submission period, RTVE announced that 825 entries had been received by the online form, 23 of which having been composed at the songwriting camp.

The participants, selected by a team including musical advisors Rayden, Pablo Cebrián and Tony Sánchez-Ohlsson, were introduced on 11 November 2023 at the Alameda Theatre in Seville by RTVE's head of communications María Eizaguirre (in the role of executive supervisor of the festival), in the context of the 2023 Latin Grammy Awards. The presentation event included performances by some of the participants of the two previous editions, namely 2023 winner Blanca Paloma (accompanied by guitarist José Pablo Polo) with her new single "¡Ay amor!", Agoney, Alfred García, Alice Wonder, Gonzalo Hermida, Karmento, Megara, Sharonne, Tanxugueiras, Varry Brava and Vicco.

While the presentation date for the selected entries was set for 14 December 2023, all song titles were inadvertently released a week earlier and multiple songs were leaked, which prompted RTVE to consider legal action. Regardless, the presentation event took place as scheduled at the RTVE Prado del Rey studios in Madrid, with Eizaguirre and festival directors Ana María Bordas and César Vallejo.

On 23 February 2024, the results of the selection procedure were published, as well as the names of the six artists and songs chosen as reserves.

Selected entries and their scores in the selection procedure
Artist	Song	Songwriter(s)	Points	Place
Almácor	"Brillos platino"	Alejandro Capdevilla Pérez; Arturo Almarcha Corella	75	13
Angy Fernández	"Sé quién soy"	Ángela María Fernández González; Dino Medanhodzic; Henrik Lundberg; Thomas G:son	82	11
Dellacruz	"Beso en la mañana"	Carlos Almazán Fuentes; Jorge de la Cruz Correa	136	4
Jorge González	"Caliente"	Adrián Ghiardo; David Parejo Martín; Jorge González González; Manuel Brea Calvo	161	2
Lérica	"Astronauta"	Antonio Mateo Chamorro; David Cuello; Eduardo Ruiz Sánchez; José Alfonso Cano Carrilero; Juan Carlos Arauzo Olivares	186	1
Mantra	"Me vas a ver"	Carlos Marco; Carlos Hugo Weinberg; Jonathan Burt; Natalia Neva; Paula Pérez Rubio	97	8
María Peláe	"Remitente"	Alba Reig Gilabert; María Peláez Sánchez	106	6
Marlena	"Amor de verano"	Ana Legazpi González; Carolina Moyano García; Joan Valls Paniza; Rubén Pérez Pérez	79	12
Miss Caffeina	"Bla bla bla"	Alberto Jiménez Rodríguez; Antonio Poza Fernández; Sergio Sastre Sanz	141	3
Nebulossa	"Zorra"	Lorenzo Giner Puchol; María José Bas Arguijo	120	5
Noan	"Te echo de -"	Íñigo Samaniego; Juan Ewan; Pepe Bernabé	88	9
Quique Niza	"Prisionero"	Kenji Domínguez Kato; José Ricardo Cortes Salcedo; Juan José Martín Martín; Óscar Cadena; Quique González	67	16
Roger Padrós	"El temps"	Joel Condal Llorens; Roger Padrós de la Torre	88	10
Sofia Coll	"Here to Stay"	Juan Manuel Pinzas Sueiro; Mauro Canut Guillén; Ignacio Canut Guillén; Sofia Coll i Benito	97	7
St. Pedro	"Dos extraños (Cuarteto de cuerda)"	Ioné de la Cruz; Nelson Hernández; Pedro Hernández Herrera	74	14
Yoly Saa	"No se me olvida"	Emilio Maestre Rico; Yolanda Saa Filgueira	67	15

Selected reserves and their scores in the selection procedure
Artist	Song	Songwriter(s)	Points	Place
Ángela Carrasco	"Él y yo"	Daniel Leal	59	4
La Beba	"No me fucking importa"	Blanca Sol; Joaquin Martinez; Pepe Bernabé	57	5
Ondina	"Me está mirando"	Salvador S. Sánchez; Ondina Maldonado	62	2
Reyko	"Run with You"	Fatima Cardelus; Igor Fejzula	60	3
Veintiuno	"Telenovela"	Diego Arroyo Bretaño; José Narváez Clemente; Rafael Pachón del Pozo; Yago Martín Banet	57	6
Verónica Terrés	"Fugaz"	Joaquín Martínez Deltell; José Bernabé; Verónica Terrés López	65	1

== Contest overview ==
=== Semi-final 1 ===
The first semi-final took place on 30 January 2024. Eight artists competed and four qualified for the final.

Semi-final 1 – 30 January 2024
R/O	Artist	Song	Expert jury	Demoscopic jury	Televote	Total	Place
1	Lérica	"Astronauta"	40	22	20	82	7
2	Noan	"Te echo de -"	46	28	22	96	6
3	Sofia Coll	"Here to Stay"	58	30	28	116	3
4	Mantra	"Me vas a ver"	33	25	40	98	5
5	Miss Caffeina	"Bla bla bla"	64	16	25	105	4
6	Quique Niza	"Prisionero"	45	20	16	81	8
7	Angy Fernández	"Sé quién soy"	62	40	35	137	2
8	Nebulossa	"Zorra"	84	35	30	149	1

=== Semi-final 2 ===
The second semi-final took place on 1 February 2024. Eight artists competed and four qualified for the final.

Semi-final 2 – 1 February 2024
R/O	Artist	Song	Expert jury	Demoscopic jury	Televote	Total	Place
1	María Peláe	"Remitente"	71	30	30	131	2
2	Dellacruz	"Beso en la mañana"	22	16	16	54	8
3	Marlena	"Amor de verano"	48	28	20	96	6
4	St. Pedro	"Dos extraños (Cuarteto de cuerda)"	94	35	35	164	1
5	Jorge González	"Caliente"	42	40	40	122	3
6	Yoly Saa	"No se me olvida"	35	22	22	79	7
7	Roger Padrós	"El temps"	55	20	28	103	5
8	Almácor	"Brillos platino"	65	25	25	115	4

=== Final ===
The final took place on 3 February 2024.

Final – 3 February 2024
R/O	Artist	Song	Expert jury	Demoscopic jury		Televote		Total	Place
R/O	Artist	Song	Expert jury	Votes	Points	Votes	Points	Total	Place
1	María Peláe	"Remitente"	41	2,272	25	1,627	20	86	6
2	St. Pedro	"Dos extraños (Cuarteto de cuerda)"	86	2,291	28	3,769	25	139	2
3	Angy Fernández	"Sé quién soy"	63	2,833	35	3,888	30	128	3
4	Jorge González	"Caliente"	49	2,855	40	4,482	35	124	4
5	Nebulossa	"Zorra"	86	2,463	30	4,484	40	156	1
6	Sofia Coll	"Here to Stay"	29	2,134	22	2,815	22	73	7
7	Miss Caffeina	"Bla bla bla"	27	1,994	16	1,096	16	59	8
8	Almácor	"Brillos platino"	51	2,058	20	3,779	28	99	5

Detailed expert jury votes
R/O	Song	Juror 1	Juror 2	Juror 3	Juror 4	Juror 5	Juror 6	Juror 7	Juror 8	Total
1	"Remitente"	6	4	5	5	6	4	5	6	41
2	"Dos extraños (Cuarteto de cuerda)"	12	10	12	10	12	12	10	8	86
3	"Sé quién soy"	10	6	8	6	7	8	8	10	63
4	"Caliente"	7	7	7	8	2	7	6	5	49
5	"Zorra"	8	12	10	12	10	10	12	12	86
6	"Here to Stay"	5	5	2	4	4	5	2	2	29
7	"Bla bla bla"	4	2	4	2	5	2	4	4	27
8	"Brillos platino"	2	8	6	7	8	6	7	7	51

== Ratings ==
Viewing figures by show
Show	Air date	Viewers (millions)	Share (%)	Ref.
Semi-final 1	30 January 2024	1.005	10.8%	
Semi-final 2	1 February 2024	1.039	10.5%	
Final	3 February 2024	1.977	16.6%	
