= Mery Bas =

Spanish singer (born 1967)

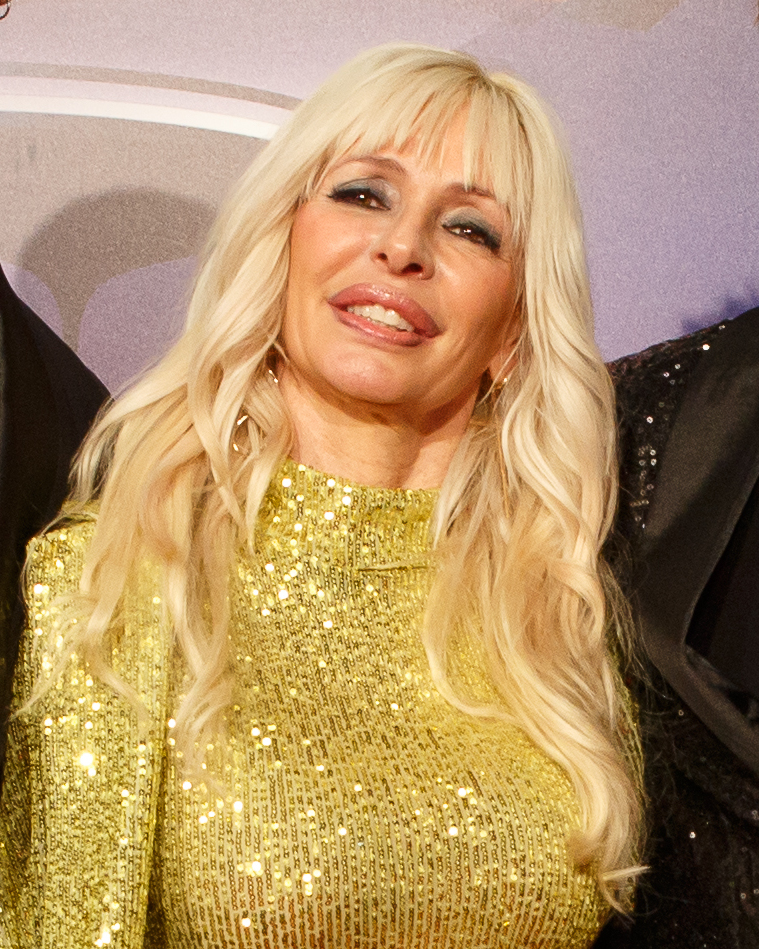
- Bas in 2024

Background information
- Born: María José Bas Arguijo; 29 December 1967 (age 58); Alicante, Spain
- Occupations: Singer; businesswoman

María José "Mery" Bas Arguijo (Spanish pronunciation: [maˈɾi.a xoˈse ˈmeɾi ˈβas aɾˈɣixo]; born 29 December 1967) is a Spanish singer. Since 2018, she has been one half of the electropop duo Nebulossa, together with her husband Mark Dasousa.

== Biography ==
Bas was born in Alicante on 29 December 1967. She is a resident of the town of Ondara (province of Alicante), where she runs a beauty center and spa, open since 1974, in the said town.

=== Nebulossa ===
Along with Dasousa, Bas formed Nebulossa in 2018. In 2022, along with Ophelia Alibrando, they participated in Una voce per San Marino, San Marino's preselection contest for the Eurovision Song Contest 2023, but did not progress past the audition stage. Nebulossa competed in Benidorm Fest 2024, the Spanish selection for the Eurovision Song Contest 2024, with the song "Zorra". They placed first in their semi-final on 30 January 2024, qualifying for the final, which they won. At the Eurovision grand final, "Zorra" placed 22nd out of 25, with 30 points.

== Personal life ==
Dasousa and Bas have been married for over 20 years and they have two children together; a daughter named Maria born in 2000 and a son named Neo born in 2014.

== Discography ==
=== With Nebulossa ===
==== Albums ====
- Poliédrica de mí (2021)

==== Singles ====
- La Colmena (2020)
- Glam (2021)
- Anoche (2022)
- Zorra (2024)
- Cotilleo (2024)
