= Sofia Coll =

Spanish actress, dancer, and singer (born 1999)

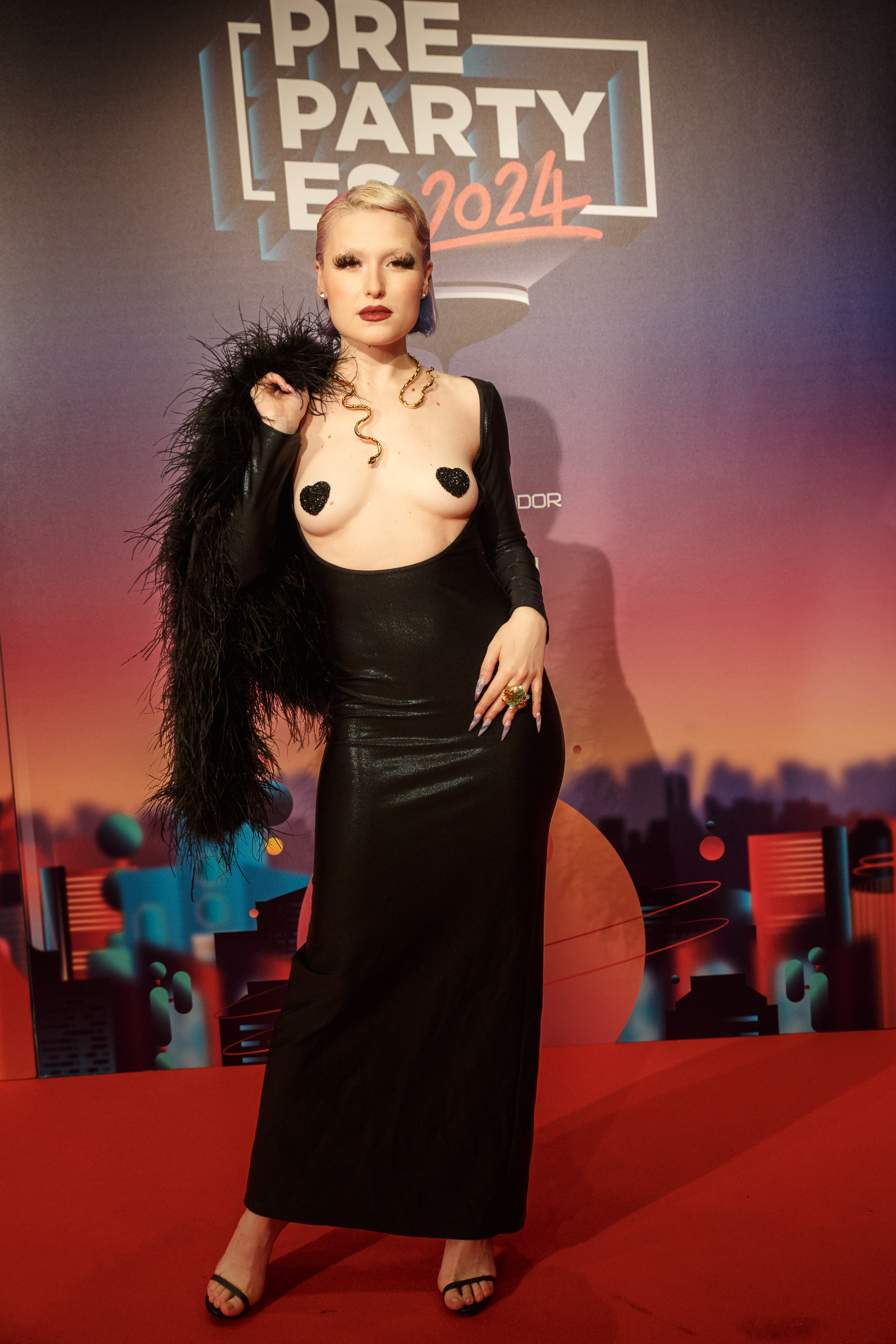
- Coll in 2024
- Born: Sofia Coll i Benito; 1 January 1999 (age 27); Barcelona, Catalonia, Spain
- Occupations: Actress; dancer; singer
- Years active: 2014–present
- Musical career
- Genres: R&B; soul; pop
- Instrument: Vocals

Sofia Coll i Benito (Catalan: [suˈfi.ə ˈkɔʎ i βəˈnitu], Spanish: [soˈfi.a ˈkol i βeˈnito]; born 1 January 1999) is a Spanish singer, dancer and actress. She rose to prominence with her participation in the second season of the TV3 program Eufòria, where she came in fourth place, and is best known for her participation in the third edition of the Benidorm Fest where she placed seventh in the final.

== Early life ==
Coll was born in Barcelona on 1 January 1999 and grew up between the El Raval and El Poble-Sec neighbourhoods of the city.

== Career ==
Coll became known for participating in the first Spanish edition of the La Voz Kids, where she was chosen in the singer Malú's team. She started her musical project in March 2019 with the release of the single Before I Forget What's Love. In February of the following year, Coll appeared on Betevé's Feeel program, in which she performed and presented several of her own songs. Later, in September 2020, she released her debut album Génesis. She was also one of the protagonists of the RTVE Catalunya series Bany Compartit (2019), in which she played Alicia, and once made it to the final casting of the program Operación Triunfo. Later, she collaborated with artists such as Rakky Ripper, Quaiko and CVMILLE.9. In 2023, she entered the second season of the TV3 musical program Eufòria, where she sang songs by artists such as Miley Cyrus, Pink, Katy Perry and Jennifer Lopez.

Coll competed in Benidorm Fest 2024, the Spanish selection for the Eurovision Song Contest 2024, with the song "Here to Stay". She came third in her semi-final on 30 January 2024, qualifying for the final, where she finished seventh.

== Musical style ==
Coll cites Beyoncé, Masego, Jorja Smith, Mahalia, Teyana Taylor, Christina Aguilera, Etta James and James Brown as influences.

== Personal life ==
Coll is a member of the LGBTQ community. Her boyfriend since 2024 is Héctor Black, a co-star in Eufòria. She has a brother named Víctor.

== Discography ==
- Génesis (2020)
- auroraboreal (2025)
