= Jorge González (singer) =

- Born: Jorge González González; September 22, 1988 (age 38); Madrid, Spain
- Genres: Latin pop; salsa
- Labels: Brea Records; Blanco y Negro Music; Universal Music Spain

Jorge González González (born 22 September 1988), is a Romani Spanish singer.

== Career ==
González emerged into the public eye thanks to his involvement with the popular Spanish singing competition television show Operación Triunfo. Taking part in the show's fifth season, which aired in 2006, González had attempted to convince his parents to allow him to audition for two straight years before he was allowed to present himself at the castings. Living at the time with his parents in Madrid, González had not received any formal musical instruction at the age of 18 when he auditioned. The self-taught pianist and vocalist was in love with the sounds of salsa and Latin pop, known to his family as "el gitanillo que canta boleros." During the competition González relied heavily on composers like Luis Miguel and Juan Luis Guerra for repertoire, ultimately achieving eighth place. Though not the winner, González left Operación Triunfo with significant exposure and a large enough fan base that he was offered a contract with Universal's Vale Music label.

González's debut disc, Dikélame, was released in the summer of 2007, that included the single "Xikila baila", that surpassed the 750,000 reproductions in YouTube and was followed by significant national touring. With such repercussion, it realized a tour of concerts by all the country. Later he was alternating his interventions in different programs of television with the galas in direct. Though his travels took him to all corners of Spain, González continues to concentrate his efforts on building his already strong fan base at home in Madrid. González's second studio album, titled Vengo a enamorarte, was released in 2009. That same year, he participated in the pre-selection to represent Spain in the Eurovision Song Contest 2009.

González attempted twice more to represent Spain in Eurovision: he competed in Mira quién va a Eurovisión in 2014 with the song "Aunque se acabe el mundo", finishing in third place; and he also competed in Benidorm Fest 2024, the Spanish selection for the Eurovision Song Contest 2024, with the song "Caliente". He came third in his semi-final on 1 February 2024, qualifying for the final, where he finished fourth.

== Discography ==
=== Albums ===
List of albums, with selected chart positions
Title	Album details	Peak chart positions
Title	Album details	SPA
Dikélame	Released: May 2007; Label: Universal Music Spain; Format: Physical, digital download, streaming	31
Vengo a enamorarte	Released: 15 March 2008; Label: Blanco y Negro Music; Format: Physical, digital download, streaming	—
Noches de eros (with Anabel Dueñas)	Released: 1 October 2010; Label: Blanco y Negro Music; Format: Physical, digital download, streaming	88

=== Extended plays ===
List of EPs, with selected details
Title	EP details
Intimo	Released: 4 March 2022; Label: Brea Records; Format: Digital download, streaming

=== Singles ===
==== As lead artist ====
Single	Year	Album or EP
"Hola mi amor"	2008	Esa Rumbita Güena
"Desde el cielo" (with Juan Martinez)	2012	Non-album singles
"Tu boquita"	2016	Non-album singles
"Esta noche" (featuring Mirella Cesa)	2018	Non-album singles
"Leon"	2019	Non-album singles
"Por besarte"	2020	Non-album singles
"Hasta que llueva" (with Moncho Chavea)	2021	Non-album singles
"Agüita" (with Soraya)	2023	Non-album singles
"Caliente"	2023	Non-album singles
"Patrá"	2024	Non-album singles

==== As featured artist ====
Single	Year	Album or EP
"Por tu amor" (Martta featuring Jorge González)	2012	Vamos a bailar
"Disco Nights" (Juan Chousa featuring Jorge González)	2016	Trust in House Music, Vol. 20
"Cuando tú estás" (Entrelazados featuring Jorge González)	2022	El amor es la respuesta
"Que bonito" (Rosario featuring Anabella Arregui, Monica Guech, and Jorge González)	2023	Espera prolongada

==== Promotional singles ====
Single	Year	Album or EP
"Historia de un amor"	2006	Operación Triunfo (OT Gala 0 / 2006)
"Déjame verte" (with Cristina)	2006	Operación Triunfo (OT Gala 1-2 / 2006)
"Será, será" (with Cristina)	2006	Operación Triunfo (OT Gala 1-2 / 2006)
"Burbujas de amor" (with Eva Carreras)	2006	Operación Triunfo (OT Gala 1-2 / 2006)
"Dame" (with José Antonio Vadillo)	2006	Operación Triunfo (OT Gala 3-4 / 2006)
"Frio sin ti" (with Mercedes Durán)	2006	Operación Triunfo (OT Gala 3-4 / 2006)
"Cuando nadie me ve" (with Daniel Zueras)	2006	Operación Triunfo (OT Gala 7-8 / 2006)
"Vente pa'Madrid"	2006	Operación Triunfo (OT Gala 7-8 / 2006)
"Dormir contigo"	2006	Operación Triunfo (OT Gala 9-10 / 2006)
"Con sólo una sonrisa"	2006	Operación Triunfo (OT Gala 9-10 / 2006)
"Lucía"	2012	La Voz
"What Are You Made Of" (with Damaris Martinez)	2012	La Voz
"Adoro"	2012	La Voz
"Hoy tengo ganas de ti"	2012	La Voz
"Valió la Pena"	2012	La Voz
"El día que me quieras"	2012	La Voz
