= Mark Dasousa =

Spanish musician and record producer (born 2 January 1974)

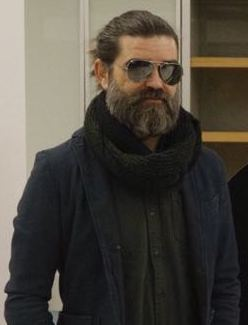
- Dasousa in 2018

Background information
- Birth name: Lorenzo Giner Puchol
- Born: 2 January 1974 (age 51) Ondara, Spain
- Occupations: Musician; Record producer

Lorenzo Giner Puchol (born 2 January 1974), known by his stage name Mark Dasousa, is a Spanish musician, music producer and founder and manager of the recording studio Atomic Studio. He was the winner of the Trayter Award for best musical producer and arranger during the 2019 Enderrock Awards gala, and has played an outsized role in the alternative music scene in the Valencian Community.

Since 2018, he has been one half of the electropop duo Nebulossa, together with his wife Mery Bas.

== Career ==
Dasousa had his first contact with music at the age of 9, when his grandfather taught him the first chords on the accordion. That same grandfather gave him his first keyboard, a Casio PT-10 and a melodica. Since then he has played in groups such as Carpe Diem, Píldora X, Atom and Solar, acting as singer and keyboard player. He began to train in a self-taught way from the 1990s and it was in 2001 that he began his work as a producer.

=== Nebulossa ===
Along with Bas, Dasousa formed Nebulossa in 2018. In 2022, along with Ophelia Alibrando, they participated in Una voce per San Marino, San Marino's preselection contest for the Eurovision Song Contest 2023, but did not progress past the audition stage. Nebulossa competed in Benidorm Fest 2024, the Spanish selection for the Eurovision Song Contest 2024, with the song "Zorra". They placed first in their semi-final on 30 January 2024, qualifying for the final, which they won.

== Personal life ==
Dasousa and Bas have been married for over 20 years and they have two children together.
