= Nebulossa =

Spanish musical duo

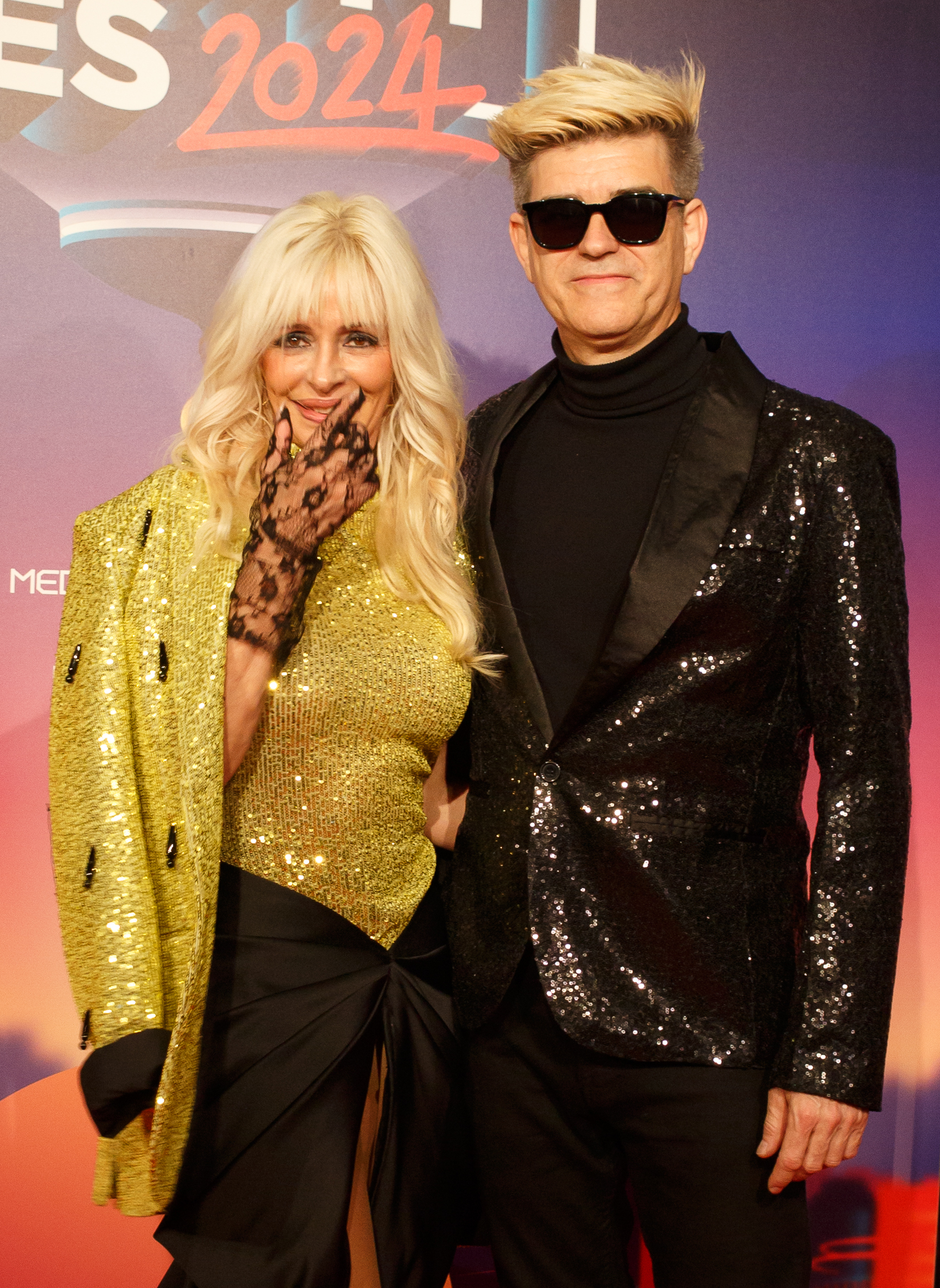
- Mark Dasousa and María Bas in 2024

Background information
- Origin: Ondara, Spain
- Genres: Electropop
- Years active: 2018–present
- Label: Atomic
- Members: Mery Bas; Mark Dasousa

Nebulossa (Spanish pronunciation: [neβuˈlosa]) is a Spanish electropop duo from Ondara, consisting of singer María "Mery" Bas (born 29 December 1967) and keyboardist and producer Mark Dasousa (born 5 May 1975).

On 3 February 2024, the duo won the Benidorm Fest 2024 with the song "Zorra", earning the right to represent Spain in the Eurovision Song Contest 2024, where they finished in 22nd place.

== History ==
=== 2018–2021: Formation and Poliédrica de mí ===
Nebulossa formed in 2018 when Bas and Dasousa decided to form a musical group. The name of the group alludes to nebulae (nebulosa in Spanish and in Portuguese ) because on a trip to Port Ainé they went to an astronomical observatory where they constantly mentioned them. The double S is a symbolic reference to the Catalan language, where many words use this spelling.

In 2020, Nebulossa presented their first single "La Colmena". The following year, in 2021, they presented their first studio album, "Poliédrica de mí", where they included the song "Glam", which was chosen as Best Song of 2021 by the Indie Cool community. They were also winners of the Studio Mans contest and nominated for the Pop Eye Awards as Breakthrough Group.

=== 2022–2024: Eurovision ===
In 2022, as a trio together with Ophelia Alibrando, they participated in Una voce per San Marino, San Marino's preselection contest for the Eurovision Song Contest 2023, but did not progress past the audition stage.

In 2023, they released their song, "Me ha dado porno". Nebulossa competed in Benidorm Fest 2024, the Spanish selection for the Eurovision Song Contest 2024, with the song "Zorra". They placed first in their semi-final on 30 January 2024, qualifying for the final of the Fest, which they won. Nebulossa then participated on 9 May at the Malmö Arena in the second semi-final, joined by Ana Villa who played percussion with luminous drumsticks. During the grand final, held on 11 May, Nebulossa performed in eighth place, but after adding the votes of the specialized jury and the televote they obtained a total of 30 points, placing 22nd.

=== 2024–present: After Eurovision ===
After returning from Malmö, Nebulossa performed on 13 May at the Madrid patron saint festivities, held at the Pradera de San Isidro. It was also confirmed that they would participate, along with other Spanish bands and artists such as Amaral and Mikel Erentxun, in the Río Verbena Fest in Pontevedra in August 2024.

== Discography ==
=== Studio albums ===
List of studio albums, with selected details
| Title | Details |
|---|---|
| Poliédrica de mí | Released: 26 May 2021; Label: Atomic Records; Format: Digital download, streaming |
| Virtuzorrismo | Released: 20 February 2026; Label: Virgin; Format: Digital download, streaming |

=== Singles ===
==== As lead artist ====
| Single | Year | Peak chart positions | | | Album or EP |
| Single | Year | SPA | LTU | SWE Heat. | Album or EP |
|---|---|---|---|---|---|
| "La colmena" | 2020 | — | — | — | Poliédrica de mí |
| "Océano de palabras" | 2020 | — | — | — | Poliédrica de mí |
| "Armada roja" | 2020 | — | — | — | Poliédrica de mí |
| "Alud de inconformismo" | 2020 | — | — | — | Poliédrica de mí |
| "Anoche" | 2020 | — | — | — | Poliédrica de mí |
| "Glam" | 2021 | — | — | — | Poliédrica de mí |
| "1N84" (with Rocío Saiz) | 2022 | — | — | — | Non-album single |
| "Me pones a mil" | 2023 | — | — | — | Virtuzorrismo |
| "Cuando te veo" | 2023 | — | — | — | Virtuzorrismo |
| "Me ha dado porno" | 2023 | — | — | — | Virtuzorrismo |
| "Zorra" | 2023 | 5 | 17 | 13 | Virtuzorrismo |
| "Cotilleo" | 2024 | — | — | — | Virtuzorrismo |
| "Por ti por mi" | 2024 | — | — | — | Virtuzorrismo |
| "Bailar hasta morir" | 2024 | — | — | — | Virtuzorrismo |
| "Venenosa" (with Mónica Naranjo) | 2025 | — | — | — | Virtuzorrismo |
| "Ya no soy la misma" | 2025 | — | — | — | Virtuzorrismo |
| "Supersexy" | 2025 | — | — | — | Virtuzorrismo |
| "Forza vamos mundial" (with various artists) | 2026 | — | — | — | Non-album single |
"—" denotes a recording that did not chart or was not released in that territory.

==== As featured artist ====
| Single | Year | Album or EP |
|---|---|---|
| "Conectados (Remix)" (Anora Kito featuring Nebulossa and David Van Bylen) | 2022 | Anora Kito |
| "Histeria de lo nuestro (Versión retro)" (Marsella featuring We Are Not Dj's and Nebulossa) | 2022 | Sombras y neones |
| "Modo avión" (Copernikal featuring Nebulossa) | 2023 | Non-album singles |
| "La gent de la Mediterrània" (La Fúmiga featuring Nebulossa and various artists) | 2026 | Non-album singles |

== Awards and nominations ==
| Year | Award | Category | Nominee(s) | Result | Ref. |
|---|---|---|---|---|---|
| 2024 | FAM Cultura Pop Eye | Revelation Award | Nebulossa | Won | |
| 2024 | Eurovision Awards | Best Onstage Ensemble | Nebulossa | Nominated | |
| 2024 | Eurovision Awards | Best Luscious Locks | Nebulossa | Nominated | |

Awards and achievements
| Preceded by Blanca Paloma | Benidorm Fest Winner; 2024 | Succeeded by Melody |
| Preceded by Blanca Paloma with "Eaea" | Spain in the Eurovision Song Contest; 2024 | Succeeded by Melody with "Esa diva" |
