= María Peláe =

Spanish singer

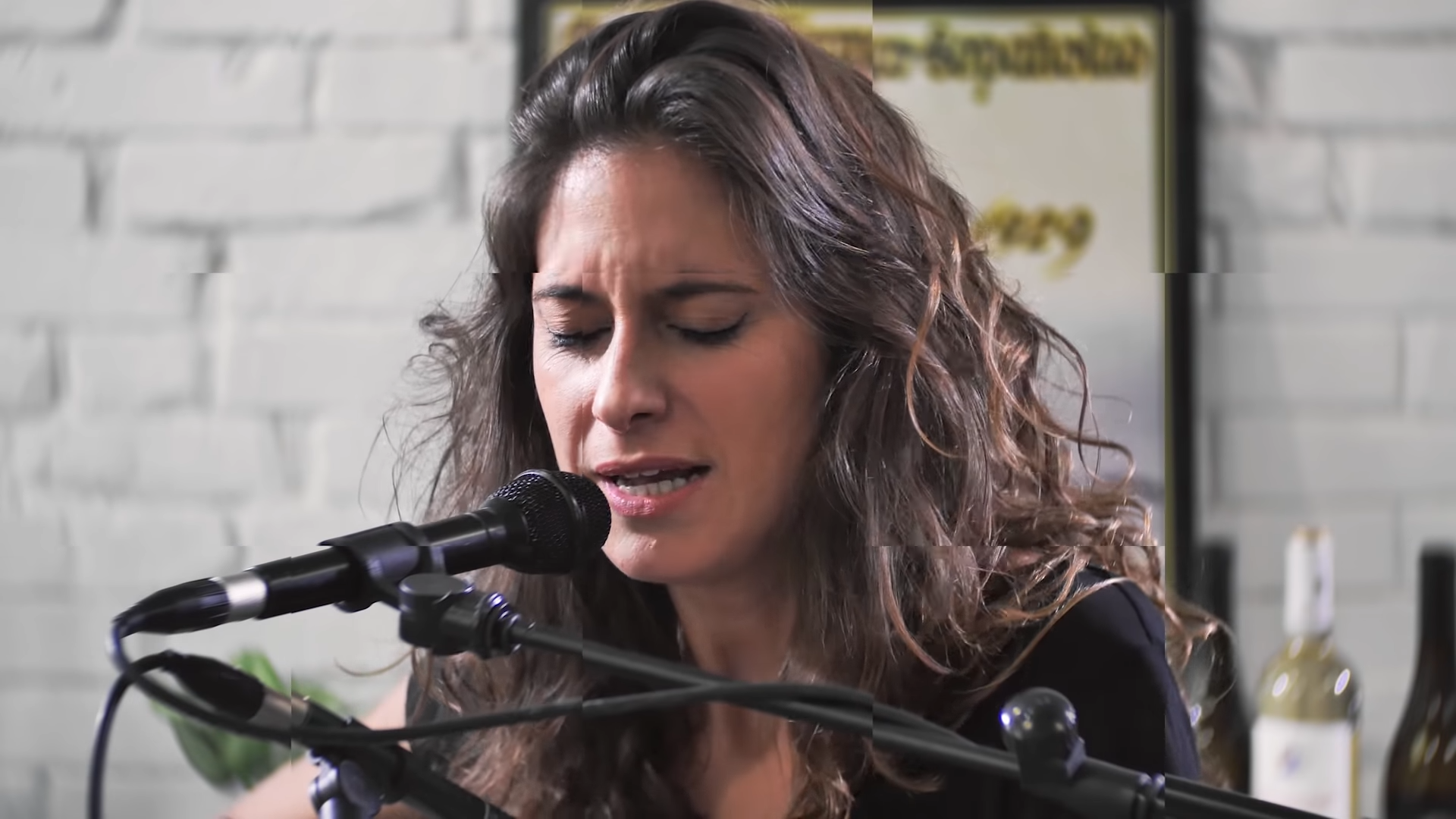
- Peláe in 2018
- Born: María Peláez Sánchez; 31 March 1990 (age 36); Málaga, Spain
- Occupations: Singer and songwriter
- Years active: 2010–present

María Peláez Sánchez (born 31 March 1990), known professionally as María Peláe, is a Spanish singer and composer. She has released two albums, entitled Hipocondría and La folcrónica. She participated as a contestant in the ninth edition of Antena 3's Tu cara me suena (2021–2022), finishing third. Her music is a mix of flamenco and pop rhythms, and the words to her songs are often humorous and critical of society.

== Life and career ==
She was born in Málaga on 31 March 1990. At the age of 13, she was given a guitar, and at 16, she gave her first concert as a percussionist. At the age of 18, shortly before entering medical school, she gave her first concert as a soloist (guitar and voice). She felt so strongly about it that she decided to study something that would allow her to combine it with music, which led her to choose social work and, later, anthropology.

In 2016, she released her first studio album, Hipocondría, thanks to a crowdfunding campaign and with it she toured a multitude of venues in various Spanish cities, such as Café Berlin in Madrid or Cochera Cabaret in Málaga.

She has composed two songs that were finalists to represent Spain at Eurovision: "Arde", sung by Aitana (composed with Alba Reig from Sweet California) and "Nadie se salva" (with Nil Moliner and Garabato), performed by Miki Núñez and Natalia Lancuza. From 2019, after delaying the start of her new project due to last minute changes, she began to upload to her Youtube channel a series of songs that denoted a change towards a more modern production (a change recommended by Alba Reig of Sweet California).

The first single from this new stage, released in July 2019, was En casa de herrero (talking about the music industry and the artist's own change of sound), and in September of that same year she released La niña (dealing with female homosexuality using irony and with autobiographical overtones).

La niña followed by Y quién no, No me mires así, sung with Alba Reig and whose video clip was recorded during the quarantine derived from the COVID-19 pandemic, La confesión, La quería with Riki Rivera on guitar, Te espero en jarra with the singer Sandra Carrasco, and Mi tío Juan (in which she talks about male homosexuality with a lot of irony). Later, she released Que vengan a por mí, a more serious song she composed after "seeing a demonstration of very young people with a lot of hate in their eyes, attacking and saying very ugly things to people who were demonstrating for something nice," as she said in an interview on the Antena 3 program El Hormiguero.

In 2023, she was a guest celebrity judge in the episode ¡Un, dos, drags! of the Spanish language reality television series Drag Race España streamed on ATRESplayer Premium.

Peláez competed in Benidorm Fest 2024, the Spanish selection for the Eurovision Song Contest 2024, with the song "Remitente". She came second in her semi-final on 1 February 2024, qualifying for the final, where she finished sixth.

=== Tu cara me suena ===
On 23 July 2021, her official participation as a contestant in the ninth edition of Antena 3's Tu cara me suena was confirmed, alongside personalities such as Los Morancos, Lydia Bosch, Loles León, Eva Soriano, David Fernández, Rasel Abad, Nia Correia and Agoney.

She became the second finalist after her imitation of Barbara Pravi, the French representative in the Eurovision Song Contest 2021. She came in third place with her imitation of Lola Flores, whom she has cited on multiple occasions as a reference, and was one of the favorites throughout the edition.

=== Personal life ===
Peláez is openly lesbian and has used her songs and appearances on TV and in the press to bring more attention to the LGBT+ community.

== Discography ==
=== Studio albums ===
- Hipocondría (2016)
- La folcrónica (2022)

=== Singles ===
- En casa de herrero (2019)
- La niña (2019)
- Y quién no (2020)
- No me mires así (2020)
- La confesión (2020)
- La quería (con Riki Rivera) (2020)
- Te espero en jarra (with Sandra Carrasco)(2021)
- Mi tío Juan (2021)
- Que vengan a por mí (2021)
- Cómo están las cosas (with Nia) (2022)
- La quería (con Pastora Soler) (2022)
- Historia de vida (with Vanesa Martín) (2022)
- Cuéntale (with Las niñas) (2022)
