= Reyko =

Spanish musical duo based in London

REYKO
- Origin: London, England
- Genres: Alt-pop; electropop; indiepop; dream pop
- Years active: 2017–present
- Labels: REYKO; Warner Music; Universal Music; Mushroom Pillow
- Members: Soleil; Igor
- Website: reykomusic.com

Reyko (stylized "REYKO") are a Spanish musical duo based in London, consisting of vocalist Soleil and producer and multi-instrumentalist Igor.

== History ==
=== Origins and formation ===
The two members of Reyko, Soleil and Igor, are from Spain but are currently based in London, England. Before forming the duo, Soleil worked as an osteopath, and Igor was a professional tennis player before deciding to pursue a music career. They started writing music together as part of Igor's music production course at the University of West London. Soon after, they began regularly posting songs on the SoundCloud platform.

They encountered success quite early when one their songs "Spinning Over You", was chosen to be the official song for a major 2018 ad campaign by El Corte Ingles. The song became a radio hit in Spain, peaking at #13 nationally. In 2018, Reyko were nominated for best new artist in LOS40 Music Awards.

In mid 2019, the duo broke ties with their then label Mushroom Pillow after they found out the label was licensing their unreleased music without their knowledge. The dispute lasted a year, during which the band was prevented from releasing any music and making any live performances.

In April 2019, Reyko contributed a version of "El Cine" to a Warner Music tribute album consisting of covers to Mecano's album Descanso Dominical.

=== 2020-2021: REYKO ===
Between August 2019 and January 2020, the duo released a series of singles: "Lose Myself", followed by "Hierba Mala", "Don't Mention My Name", "Surrender" and "La Verdad". In March 2020, the duo released their self-titled debut album, which includes their previously released singles. It has been described as “a beautiful mixture of genres and influences. The album seamlessly fuses traditional Spanish influences with new age millennial futuristic sounds. Igor’s creative production provides the perfect canvas for Soleil’s soft voice.”

In spring 2020 the duo had to postpone the album presentation tour due to the COVID-19 pandemic

=== 2021-2022: Pulse ===
From September 2020, the duo released the singles “The Game”, “Saturday” and “She Said” as an advance of their forthcoming album. Reyko's 2nd album “Pulse” was released in October 2021 to positive reviews. "Pulse" showcased Soleil's and Igor's more urgent, immediate and driving musical direction, borrowing from post-punk and electro-clash. Talking about the album, Malvika Pavin from Earmilk wrote: “Designed with a vibe meant to be “urgent, direct, and immediate,” the album sees the pair swerve away from the dreamy stylings of their debut album, with an innovative a nd eccentric blend of genres of their latest foray.”

In the beginning of '21, Reyko released a cover of EMF's classic song Unbelievable. The cover has been featured in one of the trailers of the Freeform (TV channel) Cruel Summer (TV series).

Once the pandemic restrictions were lifted in 2022, the group spent most of the year touring. The duo performed in the UK and in Europe in countries such as France, Germany, Spain and Serbia. REYKO also played in Mexico City for the 1st time in September of the same year, that being the duo's first performance in Latin America.

=== 2023-present: Fantasía ===
In January 2023, REYKO released their third album Fantasía. In their third LP the duo embraced a variety of sounds and styles merging pop, indie-rock, acoustic, electronica and post-punk. Soleil and Igor also returned to write songs in both English and Spanish languages. Speaking to Noctis Magazine about the inspiration for the album, the pair said: "It has a lot to do with the moment in time when we wrote the album, which was the end of 2021 and 2022. Huge post pandemic euphoria, but at the same time nuclear threats, big crisis scares on the news, but at the same time loads of travelling and playing in new countries, new places, etc…So we wanted to reflect all these extremes and how we were living them with our music."

The album received positive press reviews. Simon Lucas-Hughes from the magazine BackSeat Mafia wrote: "There’s no restrictions over what the band’s sound encompasses, this isn’t an indie album but more of a creative outlet, sometimes in Spanish, sometimes in English – sometimes moody and atmospheric, at others vibrant and energetic. It’s a great thing to hear music like this, where artists feel they are free enough to simply do what they want to, make the music they like whilst also managing to create their own lane, their unique, strikingly modern sound."

A few weeks after the album release, REYKO embarked on a tour in order to present the latest effort.

== Musical style ==
The duo define themselves as “DIY” since they independently write, produce, and record everything they release from their home studio based in London. They cite Billie Holiday, Lana Del Rey, The Weeknd, Lorde, Portishead, and Manu Chao as influences. Their music has been described as alt-pop.

== In media ==
Reyko's songs have been included in various soundtracks:

- "Spinning Over You" was the official song for the El Corte Ingles 2018 winter sales campaign. The song is also included in the Netflix series Elite soundtrack, episode 4 season 2.
- ”Hierba Mala” is included in the Netflix series House of Flowers soundtrack, episode 6, season 1.
- "Set You Free" is the theme song for the Netflix series Toy Boy.
- "Your Game" appears on the closing scene of the last episode of Toy Boy . The duo was asked to write the song specifically for the scene.

== Discography ==
=== Studio albums ===
- REYKO (2020)
- Pulse (2021)
- Fantasía (2023)
- Irrational (2025)

=== EPs ===
- Midnight Sunshine (2018)
