= Rebeca (Spanish singer) =

Rebeca Pous
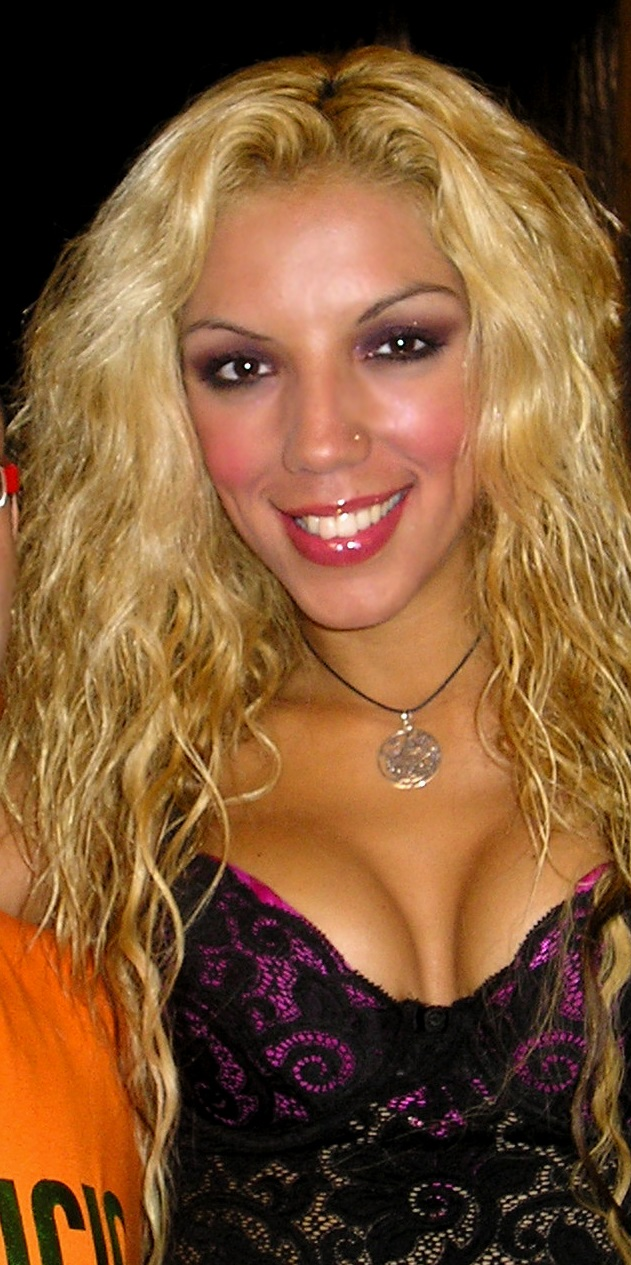
- Rebeca in 2008

Background information
- Born: Rebeca Pous del Toro; November 1, 1978 (age 47); Barcelona, Spain
- Genres: Latin pop, Eurodance
- Occupation: Singer
- Years active: 1996–present
- Website: Rebeca Official Site

Rebeca Pous del Toro (born November 1, 1974, in Barcelona, known professionally as Rebeca, is a Spanish Latin pop and Eurodance singer.

== Biography ==
She is daughter of singer Franciska, who was born in Barcelona to a Spanish mother from Valencia and a Puerto Rican father, and painter José María Pous. Eliseo del Toro, a famous Puerto Rican singer, is Rebeca's uncle and Benicio del Toro, the actor.

== Music career ==
She started her music career in 1996, when she was 21 years old. Her first single "Más Que Un Engaño" was a big hit in Spain, Latin America and US, while the following singles "Solo Amante" and "Duro De Pelar", established her as a major artist in Spain and Latin America.

Her first album called Rebeca, a big success in Spain, Latin America and United States, sold 200 000 (+) and was certified 2xPlatinum in Spain. In 1997, she released her second album Rebelde, which was a big success, and was certified Gold in Spain. In 1998 she worked on the album Grease en Español and in the Grease Tour until 1999. In 1999, the album Grandes Exitos was released in Latin America and USA but not in Spain. In 2000 she released the album Brava with moderate success in Latin America and Spain. In 2002, the album, Supernatural was released. She released her latest album in 2005, a greatest hits compilation called Lo Mejor De Rebeca.

She wrote, along with Tony Sánchez-Ohlsson, Thomas G:son and Andreas Rickstrand, the song "I Love You Mi Vida" that represented Spain in the Eurovision Song Contest 2007, performed by boy band D'Nash. She attempted to participate in Eurovisión herself in four occasions: in 2006 ("Qué no daría yo"), 2007 ("I Love You Mi Vida"), 2009 ("Amor radical") and 2010 ("Valentino Boy").

== Television ==
In 2005, Rebeca was a contestant on reality show Aventura en África (sixth season of Survivor Spain), where she finished in fourth place. In 2014, she participated again in the thirteenth season of Survivor Spain, Supervivientes: Perdidos en Honduras. During her stay in the program, she had to be evacuated from the island due to an allergic reaction to over 200 mosquito bites at one time.

== Discography ==
- 1996: Rebeca +1 500 000
- 1997: Rebelde +200 000
- 1999: Grandes Exitos
- 2000: Brava +100 000
- 2002: Supernatural +50 000
- 2005: Lo mejor de −50 000

=== Track-lists ===
Albums:

- Rebeca (1996)

1. Solo amante
2. Duro de pelar
3. No hay dos sin tres
4. Espera, chico, espera
5. Piano, Piano
6. Corazón, corazón
+50 000 7. Cállate ya
8. A un paso del fin
9. Un lugar para ti
10. Mas que un engaño
+50 000 11. Un llanto en occidente
12. Duro de pelar (NU-NGR MIX)

- Rebelde (1997)

1. Todos los chicos son igual
2. Si tu te vas
3. Al cien por cien
4. Dime si me quieres
5. Mi ciudad
6. Locos por vivir
7. Nada me puede parar
8. Mensajes de amor
9. Quien- a duo con Franciska
10. Mundo feliz

- Grandes Exitos (1999)

1. Duro De Pelar
2. Dime Si Me Quieres
3. Todos Los Chicos Son Igual
4. Corazón, corazón
5. Vas a ser mi amor – Ángel Ríos & Rebeca (from grease en español)
6. Al Cien Por Cien
7. Mas Que Un Engaño
8. Si Tu Te Vas
9. Noches de Verano – Edu & Rebeca (from grease en español)
10. Piano Piano
11. Cállate Ya
12. Nada Me Puede Parar

- Brava (2000)

1. Yo Soy Buena
2. Mi Forma de Vivir
3. Brava
4. Declaración de Amor
5. Lo Que Paso Paso
6. La Cara Oculta
7. Noche Caliente
8. Típico, Típico
9. Mas Grandes Que el Amor
10. Fiesta en Soledad

- Supernatural (2002)

1. Tatuaje
2. Eso no es amor
3. Supernatural
4. Eres tú
5. Tócame donde más me duela
6. Calor
7. Sábado noche
8. Vive
9. De cara a la pared
10. Simplemente amor
11. Te esperaré

- Lo Mejor de Rebeca (2005)

1. Duro de Pelar [África 2005 RMX]
2. Tatuaje
3. Más Que un Engaño
4. Dime Si Me Quieres
5. Corazón, Corazón
6. Piano Piano
7. Si Tú Me Vas
8. Sólo Amante
9. Supernatural
10. Duro de Pelar
11. Mi Ciudad
12. Tócame Dónde Más Me Duela
13. Eso No Es Amor
14. Nada Me Puede Parar
15. Vive
16. Calor [Remix]
17. Quisiera
18. Te Esperaré
19. Todos Los Chicos Son Igual
20. Más Que un Engaño [Pop Version]

- Matador (2010) (ep digital)

1. Matador
2. Valentino Boy
3. Much
4. Tu nombre
5. Se me olvidó

Others Songs:

- "Lo Prefiero" (unreleased)
- "Que No Daría yo"
- "I Love You Mi Vida" (unreleased)
- "Mentiras de verdad" (unreleased)
- "Sola" (unreleased)
- "Amor Radical" (unreleased)
- "Goin' you loca" (with Isaak)
- "Gloria"
- "Aquí y Ahora" EP
- "Sientes Mariposas"
- "Este Amor no se toca"
- "Hola Mariposa"
- "Because The Night"
- "I Will Survive Resistiré"

== Videography ==
- "Duro De Pelar" (European version)
- "Duro De Pelar" (Latin American version)
- "Cállate Ya"
- "Brava"
- "Que No Daría Yo"
- "Se Me Olvidó"
- "Valentino Boy"
- "Matador"
- "Se Hizo La Luz"
- "Aquí y Ahora"
- "Sientes Mariposas"
- "Este Amor No Se Toca"
- "I Will Survive Resistiré"
