= Zorra (Nebulossa song) =

2023 single by Nebulossa

Single by Nebulossa

from the album Virtuzorrismo
- Language: Spanish
- English title: "Vixen"
- Released: 15 December 2023
- Genre: Synth-pop
- Length: 3:13
- Label: Atomic; Indica
- Songwriters: Mark Dasousa; Mery Bas
- Producer: Mark Dasousa

Nebulossa singles chronology
| "Me ha dado porno" (2023) | "Zorra" (2023) | "Cotilleo" (2024) |

Music video
- "Zorra" on YouTube

Eurovision Song Contest 2024 entry
- Country: Spain
- Artist: Nebulossa
- Language: Spanish
- Composers: Mery Bas; Mark Dasousa
- Lyricists: Mery Bas; Mark Dasousa

Finals performance
- Final result: 22nd
- Final points: 30

Entry chronology
- ◄ "Eaea" (2023)
- "Esa diva" (2025) ►

Official performance video
- "Zorra" (Second Semi-Final) on YouTube "Zorra" (Grand Final) on YouTube

"Zorra" (pronounced [ˈθora]; transl. Vixen) is a song by Spanish husband and wife synth-pop duo Nebulossa. The song was written and produced by both members of the duo. It was released on 15 December 2023 through Atomic Records and Indica Entertainment. "Zorra" represented Spain in the Eurovision Song Contest 2024 in Malmö, where it placed in 22nd with 30 points at the grand final.

The song was described by the band as an attempt of reclaiming the word "zorra", which is widely used in Spain as a derogatory slang term for women, analogous to "bitch" or "slut". It was met with a heavily divided reaction in Spain. "Zorra" received some praise from both Spanish and international outlets on its attempt to reclaim the word as an empowering term for women. However, it was met with harsh criticism from multiple members and groups of the Spanish feminist community, with the idea of reclaiming a word via repetition in an empowering song being challenged. "Zorra" enjoyed commercial success, peaking at number five in its native country of Spain.

== Background and composition ==
"Zorra" was written and produced by the members of Nebulossa: Mery Bas and Mark Dasousa. The song has been described as synth-pop and electropop by various media outlets. The title of the song, repeated multiple times in the lyrics, literally means "vixen" (i.e. a female fox) but also has vulgar connotations, as it is more often used to mean "bitch" or "slut" in Spanish slang. It additionally has also drawn comparisons to 1983 single "Me gusta ser una zorra" by Spanish punk rock band Vulpes, a song that became controversial and was censored by Spanish media for its vulgarity, particularly its sexual material. The song was brought into question as potential infringement of Eurovision regulations by some feminist groups. However, both RTVE and the European Broadcasting Union, the latter of which is in charge of organising and supervising the contest, stated in public statements that the use of the word did not constitute a breach of either organisations' rules.

The word zorra was explained by Wiwibloggs as "one of the most blatant cases of built-in sexism within the Spanish language"; the euphemistic meaning of the male equivalent zorro has positive connotations, while zorra is most often used as a misogynistic insult. The song – with its theme of women's empowerment – uses this and attempts to reappropriate the insult, with the lyrics criticising society for misogyny and embracing female independence. In addition, the term "black sheep" ("oveja negra" in Spanish) is also mentioned within "Zorra" to connect and sympathise with men who have also felt discriminated by society. Bas later stated in interviews that the song was inspired by her own experiences with discrimination and marginalisation, stating that she was discriminated for being a single mother and for having been married three times. El País' Martin Bianchi described the song's legacy as a political issue; in response, the duo stated in El País that "we have chosen to stay out of that... We have been with many people on the left and right who have supported the song, and we are happy with that."

== Music video and promotion ==
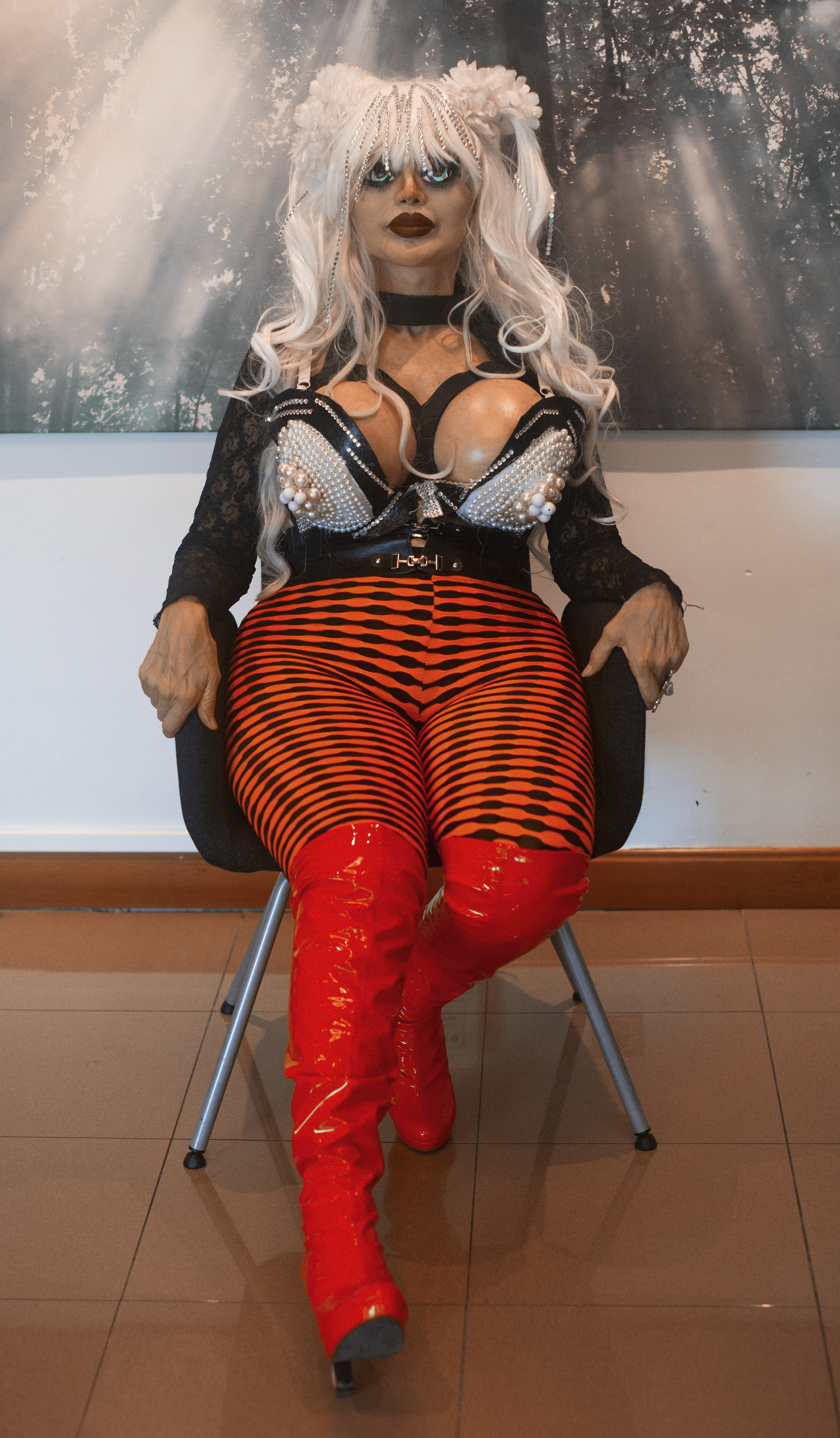
Manuela Trasobares (pictured in 2023) was mentioned in the music video for "Zorra".

An accompanying music video for "Zorra" directed by Laia Lluch was released on the same day as the song's release on 15 December. The music video features Bas performing on a stage to a contrasting audience of disapproving men and smiling women. The audience is primarily older, which was intended by Lluch as a way of "sending a message of empowerment and liberation to break taboos". The video also references to transgender singer and politician Manuela Trasobares, featuring a recreation of a moment from the 1990s where Trasobares threw a drinking glass on the floor during an episode of Spanish talk show Parle osté, calle vosté while calling for women's liberation. In addition, Bas wore an outfit similar to Trasobares' outfit during her appearance on the show. Nebulossa also referenced this moment after their performance in the final of Benidorm Fest.

To further promote the song, the duo performed their song on numerous occasions in the months heading into Eurovision 2024, including Pre-Party ES on 30 March, the Barcelona Eurovision Party on 6 April, the London Eurovision Party on 7 April, Eurovision in Concert on 13 April, and the Nordic Eurovision Party on 14 April. They also performed the song at the Swedish embassy in Madrid on 10 April and at a Rome nightclub on 26 April.

On 7 February 2024, Radiotelevisión Española (RTVE) announced that the official English title of the song, "Vixen", with Nebulossa releasing a music video of the song with official English lyrics that translates zorra as "vixen" throughout the video. Official translations of the song were also released in French, German, Italian and Swedish. Additionally, a remixed version of the song featuring a collaboration between Nebulossa and Gloria Trevi was released on 5 April. Also in February 2024, a parody of the song titled "Facha" was performed on Catalan comedy television show Polònia. The parody, which was inspired by Spanish prime minister Pedro Sánchez's comments on the song, parodied the leadership of Madrid politician and president of the Community of Madrid Isabel Díaz Ayuso, including her political views, plans to expand the city's events, and her rise to power.

== Critical reception ==
=== Spanish media and personalities ===
Reception in Spain was heavily divisive. Upon learning about the song, Trasobares praised it for attempting to reclaim "zorra", stating in Eurovision Fam, "it is an empowerment of women after so many years... Now we take the reins of our lives and anticipate the patriarchy, we ourselves are the ones who empower that word." Rigoberta Bandini, a previous competitor in Benidorm Fest, gave positive remarks toward the song, stating that she thought it was "a very brave proposal [and] very funny.... I hope it works at Eurovision and that they understand the bitches that we are." Pedro Sánchez, the prime minister of Spain, stated that while the "fachosphere" would have preferred any other competing song to win Benidorm Fest 2024, he personally preferred "Zorra". Regarding the song's performance, Carlos Marcos of El País proclaimed, "Nebulossa is among the best... they have managed to get the audience... to shout: 'I'm even sluttier'. Good for Nebulossa."

Criticism was levied against "Zorra" by some feminist personalities. Najat El Hachimi, a columnist writer for El País, wrote a heavily negative review on the song, writing that she found the song's attempt at reclaiming "zorra" useless. She further echoed Alicia Puleo's comments on the song, describing it as a "banal deformation of feminist demands". Another reporter for El País, Laura Freixas, stated that she thought the idea of reclaiming a slur was "delulu, not [the] solulu". Carmen Calvo, a former Deputy Prime Minister of Spain, stated that the song was "a song to win money and votes". Ángeles Álvarez and Laura Berja, two Spanish politicians known for their advocacy of feminism, stated the opinion that the repetitive usage of "zorra" within the song did not empower women. RTVE's Diversity, Equity, and Inclusion delegate, Montserrat Boix, resigned in the wake of Nebulossa's victory, posting on Twitter, "'Zorra' is neither empowerment for women, nor feminism". In a February 2024 survey conducted by El Mundo containing 1,866 people, the majority in both men and women surveyed did not think that "Zorra" empower women. In response to criticism, Nebulossa stated that "we did not intend to make an anthem, the surprise has been that people have appropriated the message".

=== Eurovision-related and international media ===
"Zorra" received mixed media reception from international outlets. In a Wiwibloggs review containing several reviews from several critics, the song was rated 7.2 out of 10 points, earning 12th out of 37 songs on the site's annual ranking. Reviews from Wiwibloggs praised the song's message, but some reviewers criticised the vocals and melody of the song. Jon O'Brien, a writer for Vulture, ranked the song 14th out of 37 songs, describing it as an "example of how there’s often substance to Eurovision’s wacky style", referring to the song's message and sexual content. ESC Beat's Doron Lahav ranked the song 24th overall, writing that while he thought it was "100% enjoyable synth pop", he admitted that "[I think] the vocals towards the end should improve." Erin Adam of The Scotsman rated the song seven out of ten points, admitting that while "it's not going to win", it was "a cult favourite in the making". The Times' Ed Potton ranked the song third out of 26 finalists in Eurovision 2024, rating "Zorra" four out of five stars and comparing it to "defiant electro-disco in the grand tradition of Donna Summer".

National Public Radio's (NPR) Glen Weldon included it in his list of 10 overall favourites to win the contest, writing that "Nebulossa does solid work not only reclaiming [zorra], but luxuriating in it." Harmen van Dijk, Peter van der Lint, and Nienke Schipper from Dutch newspaper Trouw criticised the song for being an upbeat yet "meaningless electro-pop song", further criticising Bas' vocals for not being powerful enough for the song's message. The BBC's Nadia Ragozhina and Johanna Chisholm highlighted the song's Hi-NRG elements, comparing it to "the theme music to a forgotten 1980s youth programme presented by DJ Normski". The Daily Telegraph's Neil McCormick also criticised Bas' vocals, further describing the song as "something you might have heard on a hen do in a backstreet hotel disco on the Costa Del Sol in the 1970s, warmed up with some 80s techno synth presets".

== Eurovision Song Contest ==
=== Benidorm Fest 2024 ===
RTVE organised a 16-entry competition, Benidorm Fest 2024, the third iteration of the Benidorm Fest, in order to select its entry for the Eurovision Song Contest 2024. It consisted of two semi-finals consisting of eight songs, with the top four songs in each semi-final qualifying for the grand final. The results of each show were determined through a combination of public televoting, a demoscopic jury consisting of 350 people from a third-party company, and a jury consisting of four Spanish and four international juries. The categories made up of 25%, 25%, and 50% of the total vote, respectively.

"Zorra" was announced as a song in the competition on 14 December 2023. It was placed into the first semi-final, where it was drawn to perform eighth. It qualified from the first semi-final, winning with 149 points. It was later drawn to perform fifth in the grand final. "Zorra" proceeded to win the competition with 156 points, earning the top position in both the public televote and the expert jury, and third in the demoscopic jury. As a result of the victory, the song went to represent Spain in the Eurovision Song Contest 2024.

=== At Eurovision ===
The Eurovision Song Contest 2024 took place at the Malmö Arena in Malmö, Sweden, and consisted of two semi-finals held on the respective dates of 7 and 9 May and the final on 11 May 2024. As Spain was a member of the "Big Five", "Zorra" automatically qualified for the grand final. It was drawn to be positioned in the running order via the producer's choice; it was placed eighth in the running order, ahead of Lithuania's "Luktelk" by Silvester Belt and before Estonia's "(Nendest) narkootikumidest ei tea me (küll) midagi" by 5miinust and Puuluup.

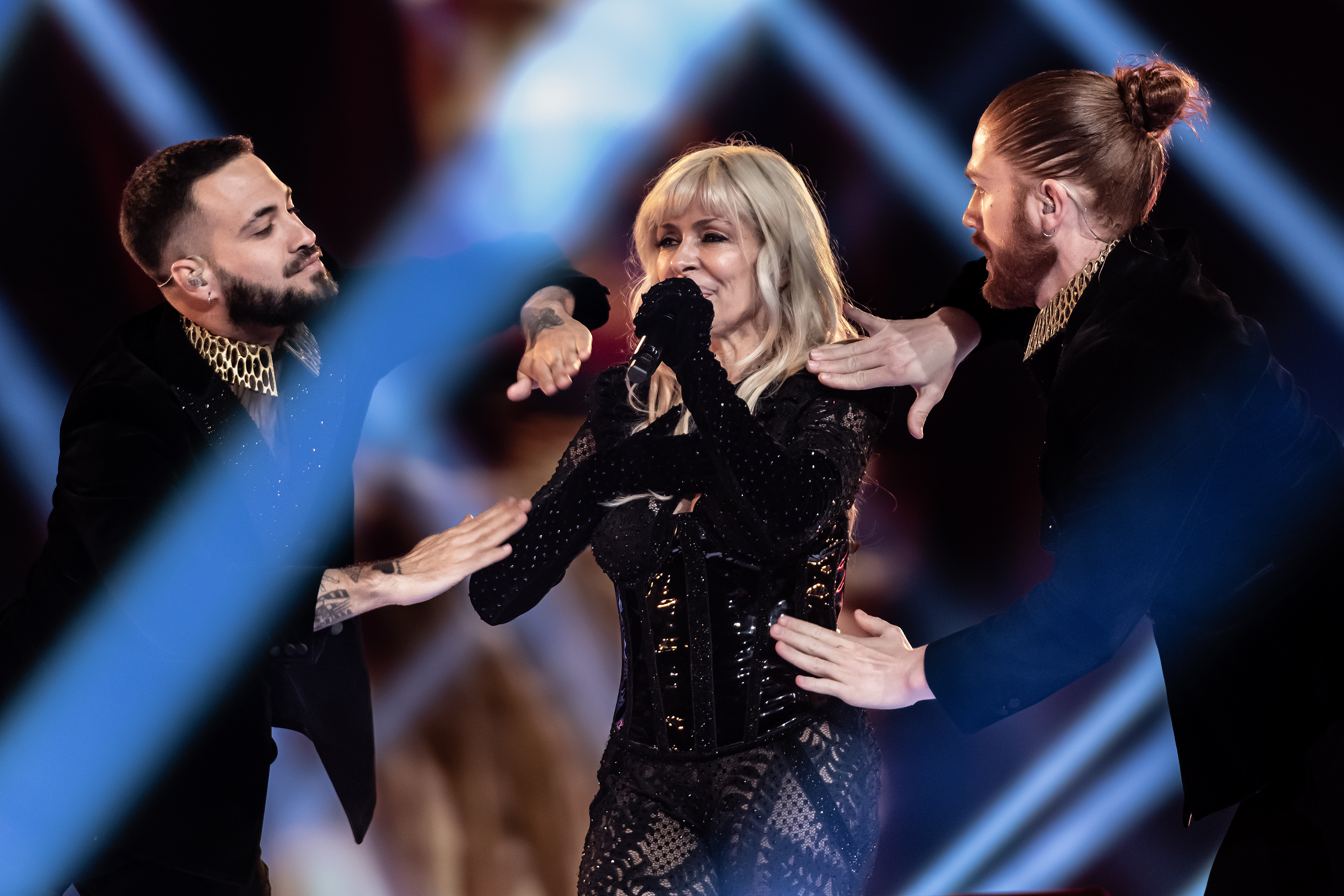
Nebulossa performing "Zorra" at a dress rehearsal before the Eurovision 2024 grand final.

For its Eurovision performance, Israel Reyes and Juan Sebastián Domínguez were appointed as staging directors. Before the contest, the band stated that they would refuse to change the song in any way despite pushback against the song along with looming threats of a potential rewrite request given by the European Broadcasting Union (EBU). The performance featured Mery Bas in a Michael Costello-designed black corset adorned with rhinestones, meant to represent a dominatrix. Two backing dancers and a backing singer were also appointed to accompany Nebulossa. The usage of red sofas and lamps were applied, which was meant to apply a "cabaret atmosphere" for the performance. Visuals of Venus de Milo, a red lock, and a background inspired by the 1927 film Metropolis were also shown to represent classical feminity, a liberated society, and the city of Benidorm, respectively.

After the results were announced, they finished in 22nd with 30 points, with a split score of 19 points from juries and 11 points from public televoting. No countries gave a set of the maximum 12 points in either category for the song. Regarding the former, the most a country gave was a set of seven points, awarded by Italy. In the public televote, the most a country gave was three, awarded by Finland and Portugal. In response to their result, band member Mark Dasousa responded that "[it is not true] that we didn't care about the score... but we are not competitive people and we have learned a lot". The result was met with mixed reception in Spain. On Spanish talk show La Roca, host Nuria Roca applauded Nebulossa's efforts at the contest, stating, "regardless of the position, which is not good, it is a hit song, it is an anthem... The performance she gave was what was expected." In contrast, Juan del Val, another host on the show, expressed disappointment, proclaiming that "the position is shit... it is a festival where it is about placing first before second and second before third, and we have finished in 22nd." El País' Carlos Marcos stated on 12 May, "[the result was a] little less than expected. But we liked their performance... for better or worse, they control the situation, they are back from everything, [and] they went there to enjoy and no one was going to ruin their moment of exposure and glory".

== Track listing ==
Digital download/streaming

1. "Zorra" – 3:03

Digital download/streaming – Gloria Trevi remix

1. "Zorra (Remix)" – 3:03

== Charts ==
Chart performance for "Zorra"
| Chart (2024) | Peak position |
|---|---|
| Greece International (IFPI) | 26 |
| Lithuania (AGATA) | 17 |
| Spain (PROMUSICAE) | 5 |
| Sweden Heatseeker (Sverigetopplistan) | 13 |
| UK Singles Downloads (Official Charts) | 47 |
| UK Singles Sales (OCC) | 47 |

== Certifications ==
Certifications for "Zorra"
| Region | Certification | Certified units/sales |
|---|---|---|
| Spain (Promusicae) | Platinum | 60,000^{‡} |
^{‡} Sales+streaming figures based on certification alone.

== Release history ==
Release history and formats for "Zorra"
| Country | Date | Format(s) | Version | Label | Ref. |
|---|---|---|---|---|---|
| Various | 15 December 2023 | Digital download; streaming | Single track | Atomic; Indica | |
| Various | 5 April 2024 | Digital download; streaming | Gloria Trevi remix | Atomic; Indica | |
