= Inti (drag queen) =

Bolivian-Spanish drag queen, activist, and multidisciplinary artist

- Born: José Otero Aguilera; November 20, 2000 (age 25); La Paz, Bolivia
- Occupation: Drag queen
- Known for: Drag Race España

Inti is the stage name of José Otero Aguilera (born 20 November 2000), a Bolivian-born Spanish drag queen, activist, and multidisciplinary artist best known for competing on the first season of Drag Race España.

== Early life ==
José Otero Aguilera was born on November 20, 2000, in La Paz, the capital of Bolivia. With a family with roots in the artistic world, they immigrated to Spain with their mother when they were three years old, and was raised in Madrid. Their mother works as a nail artist, and their brother, René, is a dancer. Additionally, their grandmother was a dancer and rhythmic gymnast, while their grandfather was a musician. At the age of fourteen, they began a career in modeling, as well as beginning to participate in the Spanish ballroom scene. Also as a teenager, they were given a makeup kit for the first time as an attempt at relief from their chronic anxiety, which rendered them near-bedridden from panic attacks.

== Career ==
They discovered an interest in drag and club culture after watching a video by Charles Jeffrey about the club kid scene in New York City and began sneaking into local clubs in Madrid. There, they discovered performers such as La Prohibida, Kika Lorace, and eventual Drag Race España host Supremme de Luxe, as well as castmate Pupi Poisson. Their drag persona was conceived in 2018 after performing in a Putochinomaricón show. They named themselves "Inti" as a reference to the Inca sun god of the same name, which served as an homage to their culture and ancestry. The word also means "sun" in the Quechua language. They additionally chose the name because they wanted something short and memorable, similar to one of their favorite music albums, Rihanna's ANTI, and felt that the name "arose" in them, as they had not been able to visit Bolivia since they had immigrated to Spain due to papers and financial constraints.

In 2021, they participated in the first season of Drag Race España, the Spanish version of the American drag competition RuPaul's Drag Race. Born in the year 2000, they became the first person born in the 21st century to participate in the franchise, as well as the first Bolivian contestant. In the third episode of the program, during the runway portion, they presented a look inspired by the Bolivian diablada, but after receiving negative criticism from the jury, and being among the possible eliminated, they decided to remove themselves from the competition. They later appeared as a part of the Gran Hotel de las Reinas tour, the official national tour of Drag Race España, alongside their fellow castmates and host Supremme de Luxe.

In 2022, they made an appearance on the TVE program Maestros de costura, along with Daniela Santiago and other participants of Drag Race España, such as Carmen Farala, Hugáceo Crujiente, Pupi Poisson, and Killer Queen.

== Personal life ==
They are of Quechua heritage and identify as nonbinary. While competing on Drag Race España, they lived between Madrid and Antwerp, Belgium. Since then, they have relocated to Barcelona, Spain, and then to London, United Kingdom. They cite their artistic inspirations to be RuPaul, FKA Twigs, Twiggy Pucci Garçon, Leiomy Maldonado, Kevin Aviance, Divine, David Bowie, Bad Bunny, Lorna, Chiky Bom Bom "La Pantera", and Grace Jones. They refer to their fans as "soles".

== Filmography ==
Television

- Drag Race España (2021)
- Maestros de costura (2022)

== Discography ==
Singles

- "Q'IWA" (2022)
