= Drag Race España season 1 =

First season of Drag Race España

Drag Race España
- Season 1
- Promotional poster for season one
- Hosted by: Supremme de Luxe
- Judges: Supremme de Luxe; Ana Locking; Javier Ambrossi; Javier Calvo
- No. of contestants: 10
- Winner: Carmen Farala
- Runners-up: Killer Queen; Sagittaria
- Miss Congeniality: Pupi Poisson
- No. of episodes: 9

Release
- Original network: ATRESplayer Premium (Spain); WOW Presents Plus (International)
- Original release: 30 May – 25 July 2021

Season chronology
- Next → Season 2

The first season of Drag Race España premiered on 30 May and concluded on 25 July 2021. The competition was broadcast on ATRESplayer Premium in Spain and on WOW Presents Plus internationally. The competition saw ten Spanish drag queens compete for the title of the "Spain's First Drag Superstar", and a cash prize of €30,000.

The cast was officially revealed through social media on 5 May 2021. The winner of the first season was Carmen Farala, with Killer Queen and Sagittaria ending as runners-up. On 1 August 2021, an extra episode aired, where the three finalists watch the grand finale for the first time and react to finding out the winner. The special episode was hosted by television presenter Jonathan Ruiz.

== Contestants ==
Ages, names, and cities stated are at time of filming.

Contestants of Drag Race España season 1 and their backgrounds
Contestant	Age	Hometown	Outcome
Carmen Farala	31	Seville, Andalusia	Winner
Killer Queen	31	Madrid, Community of Madrid	Runners-up
Sagittaria	22	Barcelona, Catalonia	Runners-up
Pupi Poisson	38	Madrid, Community of Madrid	4th place (Note: Pupi Poisson was voted Miss Congeniality by fellow contestants.)
Dovima Nurmi	24	Barcelona, Catalonia	5th place
Hugáceo Crujiente	25	Valencia, Valencian Community	6th place
Arantxa Castilla-La Mancha	23	Badajoz, Extremadura	7th place
Inti	20	La Paz, Bolivia	8th place (Note: Inti quit the competition during Untucked.)
Drag Vulcano	30	Las Palmas, Canary Islands	9th place
The Macarena	29	Cádiz, Andalusia	10th place

== Contestant progress ==
Legend:

Carmen Farala won Drag Race España season 1.
Killer Queen and Sagittaria were the runners-up.
Pupi Poisson was voted Miss Congeniality (Miss C) by fellow contestants.
WIN indicates that the contestant won the challenge.
SAFE indicates that the contestant was declared safe by the judges.
BTM (Bottom) indicates that the contestant was up for elimination.
ELIM (Eliminated) indicates that the contestant was eliminated.
QUIT indicates that Inti quit the competition.
Guest indicates that the contestant returned as a guest.

Contestants progress with placements in each episode
Contestant	Episode								
Contestant	1	2	3	4	5	6	7	8	9
Carmen Farala	SAFE	WIN	SAFE	SAFE	SAFE	WIN	WIN	Guest	Winner
Killer Queen	SAFE	SAFE	SAFE	WIN	BTM	SAFE	BTM	Guest	Runner-up
Sagittaria	SAFE	SAFE	WIN	SAFE	SAFE	BTM	BTM	Guest	Runner-up
Pupi Poisson	SAFE	SAFE	SAFE	SAFE	WIN	SAFE	ELIM	Miss C	Guest
Dovima Nurmi	BTM	SAFE	BTM	SAFE	SAFE	ELIM		Guest	Guest
Hugáceo Crujiente	WIN	SAFE	SAFE	BTM	ELIM			Guest	Guest
Arantxa Castilla-La Mancha	SAFE	BTM	SAFE	ELIM				Guest	Guest
Inti	SAFE	SAFE	QUIT					Guest	Guest
Drag Vulcano	SAFE	ELIM						Guest	Guest
The Macarena	ELIM							Guest	Guest

== Lip syncs ==
Legend:

The contestant won the Lip Sync for the Crown and was declared the winner of the season.
The contestant was eliminated after their first time in the bottom.
The contestant was eliminated after their second time in the bottom.
The contestant was eliminated after their third time in the bottom.

Episode	Contestants			Song	Eliminated
1	Dovima Nurmi	vs.	The Macarena	"Sobreviviré" (Mónica Naranjo)	The Macarena
2	Arantxa Castilla-La Mancha	vs.	Drag Vulcano	"Veneno pa tu piel" (La Veneno)	Drag Vulcano
3	Dovima Nurmi			"Mocatriz" (Ojete Calor)	None (Note: Inti, who was up for elimination and supposed to lip-sync, quit the competition before going on stage.)
4	Arantxa Castilla-La Mancha	vs.	Hugáceo Crujiente	"Pussy" (Bad Gyal)	Arantxa Castilla-La Mancha
5	Hugáceo Crujiente	vs.	Killer Queen	"Espectacular" (Fangoria)	Hugáceo Crujiente
6	Dovima Nurmi	vs.	Sagittaria	"Aute Cuture" (Rosalía)	Dovima Nurmi
7	Killer Queen vs. Pupi Poisson vs. Sagittaria			"Cuando tú vas" (Chenoa)	Pupi Poisson
Episode	Final contestants			Song	Winner
9	Carmen Farala vs. Killer Queen vs. Sagittaria			"La gata bajo la lluvia" (Rocío Dúrcal)	Carmen Farala

== Guest judges ==
Listed in chronological order:

- Jon Kortajarena, model and actor
- Paca la Piraña, former showgirl and actress
- Carlos Areces, actor and singer
- Bad Gyal, singer and songwriter
- Alaska, singer
- Susi Caramelo, comedian
- Envy Peru, drag queen, winner of the first season of Drag Race Holland

=== Special guests ===
Guests who appeared in episodes, but did not judge on the main stage.

Episode 4

- Samantha Hudson, performer and activist
- Kika Lorace, drag queen

Episode 6

- Brays Efe, actor

Episode 8

- Alexis Mateo, contestant on season three of RuPaul's Drag Race and season one and season five of RuPaul's Drag Race All Stars

Episode 9

- Valentina, drag queen, contestant and Miss Congeniality on the ninth season of RuPaul's Drag Race, and contestant on the fourth season of All Stars
- Carmelo Segura, choreographer

== Episodes ==
No. overall	No. in series	Title	Original release date
1	1	"¡Bienvenidas a España!" "Bienvenidas Reinas"	30 May 2021
Ten queens enter the workroom. For the first mini-challenge, the queens do a photoshoot while riding a mechanical bull. Carmen Farala wins the mini-challenge. For the main challenge, the queens create a look made out of rummage sale items. On the runway, category is De Mercadillo (From the Flea Market). Carmen Farala, Hugáceo Crujiente and Sagittaria receive positive critiques, with Hugáceo Crujiente winning the challenge. Dovima Nurmi, Pupi Poisson and The Macarena receive negative critiques, with Pupi Poisson being safe. Dovima Nurmi and The Macarena lip-sync to "Sobreviviré" by Mónica Naranjo. Dovima Nurmi wins the lip-sync and The Macarena is the first queen to sashay away.: Guest Judge: Jon Kortajarena; Mini-Challenge: Photoshoot while riding a mechanical bull; Mini-Challenge Winner: Carmen Farala; Main Challenge: Create a look made out of rummage sale items; Runway Theme: De Mercadillo (From the Flea Market); Challenge Winner: Hugáceo Crujiente; Bottom Two: Dovima Nurmi and The Macarena; Lip-Sync Song: "Sobreviviré" by Mónica Naranjo; Eliminated: The Macarena; Farewell Message: "Recordad todo Lo que os he dicho Sois unas estrellas TODAS DALE A TU CUERPO ALEGRIA. the MACARENA" ("Remember everything I have told you. You are stars EVERYONE GIVE YOUR BODY JOY. the MACARENA")
2	2	"Divas"	6 June 2021
For this week's mini-challenge, the queens have to unscramble the letters shown by the pit crew to find the hidden word. Pupi Poisson wins the mini-challenge. For the main challenge, the queens write, record, and perform verses to "Divas".: Team Las Cinco y Cuarto (The Quarter Past Five) - Arantxa Castilla La Mancha, Dovima Nurmi, Inti and Pupi Poisson; Team Las Metal Donnas (The Metal Donnas) - Carmen Farala, Hugáceo Crujiente, Killer Queen and Sagittaria; On the runway, category is Tributo a La Veneno (Tribute to La Veneno). Carmen Farala and Pupi Poisson receive positive critiques, with Carmen Farala winning the challenge. Arantxa Castilla La Mancha, Drag Vulcano and Inti receive negative critiques, with Inti being safe. Arantxa Castilla La Mancha and Drag Vulcano lip-sync to "Veneno pa tu piel" by La Veneno. Arantxa Castilla La Mancha wins the lip-sync and Drag Vulcano sashays away.: Guest Judge: Paca la Piraña; Mini-Challenge: Unscramble the letters shown by the pit crew to find the hidden word; Mini-Challenge Winner: Pupi Poisson; Main Challenge: Write, record, and perform verses to "Divas"; Runway Theme: Tributo a La Veneno (Tribute to La Veneno); Challenge Winner: Carmen Farala; Bottom Two: Arantxa Castilla La Mancha and Drag Vulcano; Lip-Sync Song: "Veneno pa tu piel" by La Veneno; Eliminated: Drag Vulcano; Farewell Message: "♡ JAMAS APAGUEN SU LLAMA 💋 VULKI" ("♡ NEVER PUT OUT YOUR FLAME 💋 VULKI")
3	3	"Mocatriz"	13 June 2021
For this week's mini-challenge, the queens create a quick drag character to play football. Killer Queen wins the mini-challenge. For the main challenge, the queens pair up and act as influencers for a themed magazine.: Abuela (Granny) - Arantxa Castilla La Mancha and Killer Queen; Chunga (Ratchet) - Hugáceo Crujiente and Pupi Poisson; Glamurosa (Glamorous) - Carmen Farala and Dovima Nurmi; Pilingui (Hooker) - Inti and Sagittaria; On the runway, category is Mis Raíces (My Roots). Pupi Poisson and Sagittaria receive positive critiques, with Sagittaria winning the challenge. Dovima Nurmi and Inti receive negative critiques, and are announced as the bottom two. Backstage during Untucked, Inti decides to leave the competition, due to her getting negative critiques. Back on stage, Dovima Nurmi is asked to lip-sync alone to "Mocatriz" by Ojete Calor, with no further elimination.: Guest Judge: Carlos Areces; Mini-Challenge: Create a quick drag character to play football; Mini-Challenge Winner: Killer Queen; Main Challenge: In pairs, act as influencers for a themed magazine; Runway Theme: Mis Raíces (My Roots); Challenge Winner: Sagittaria; Bottom Two: Dovima Nurmi and Inti; Lip-Sync Song: "Mocatriz" by Ojete Calor; Quit: Inti
4	4	"Snatch Game - España Season 1" "Snatch Game"	20 June 2021
For this week's mini-challenge, the queens read each other to filth. Pupi Poisson wins the mini-challenge. For the main challenge, the queens play the Snatch Game. Kika Lorace and Samantha Hudson star as the celebrity contestants. The cast consisted of: Arantxa Castilla La Mancha as Belén Esteban; Carmen Farala as Dakota Tárraga; Dovima Nurmi as Cayetana Fitz-James Stuart; Hugáceo Crujiente as Mona Lisa; Killer Queen as Isabel Díaz Ayuso; Pupi Poisson as Karina; Sagittaria as Encarnita Rojas; On the runway, categories are Choni de Barrio (Trashy Chick), Ejecutiva Agressiva (Aggressive Executive) and Jet-Set Marbellí (Marbella Jet-Set). Killer Queen, Pupi Poisson and Sagittaria receive positive critiques, with Killer Queen winning the challenge. Arantxa Castilla La Mancha, Carmen Farala and Hugáceo Crujiente receive negative critiques, with Carmen Farala being safe. Arantxa Castilla La Mancha and Hugáceo Crujiente lip-sync to "Pussy" by Bad Gyal. Hugáceo Crujiente wins the lip-sync and Arantxa Castilla La Mancha sashays away.: Guest Judge: Bad Gyal; Mini-Challenge: Reading Is Fundamental; Mini-Challenge Winner: Pupi Poisson; Mini-Challenge Prize: A pack of underwear and swimsuits courtesy of Addicted.; Main Challenge: Snatch Game; Runway Themes: Choni de Barrio (Trashy Chick), Ejecutiva Agressiva (Aggressive Executive) and Jet-Set Marbellí (Marbella Jet-Set); Challenge Winner: Killer Queen; Bottom Two: Arantxa Castilla La Mancha and Hugáceo Crujiente; Lip-Sync Song: "Pussy" by Bad Gyal; Eliminated: Arantxa Castilla La Mancha; Farewell Message: "ESTO LO LIMPIAIS VOSOTRAS, ESTRELLAS ARANTXA CASTILLA LA MANCHA" ("YOU CLEAN THIS UP, STARS ARANTXA CASTILLA LA MANCHA")
5	5	"The Art of Drag" "Básica o cínica"	27 June 2021
For this week's mini-challenge, the queens pair up and stomp grapes to make the most juice. Carmen Farala and Pupi Poisson win the mini-challenge. For the main challenge, the queens act in a drag version of the series Física o Química called "Básica o Cínica".: Carmen Farala plays Mari Fer; Dovima Nurmi plays Olanda; Hugáceo Crujiente plays Orka; Killer Queen plays Cabana; Pupi Poisson plays Lolimpia Díaz; Sagittaria plays Pabla; On the runway, category is Arte Español: Eleganza Extravaganza (Spanish Art: Eleganza Extravaganza). Carmen Farala and Pupi Poisson receive positive critiques, with Pupi Poisson winning the challenge. Hugáceo Crujiente and Killer Queen receive negative critiques, and are announced as the bottom two. They lip-sync to "Espectacular" by Fangoria. Killer Queen wins the lip-sync and Hugáceo Crujiente sashays away.: Guest Judge: Alaska; Mini-Challenge: In pairs, stomp grapes and make the most juice; Mini-Challenge Winners: Carmen Farala and Pupi Poisson; Main Challenge: Act in a drag version of the series Física o Química called "Básica o Cínica"; Runway Theme: Arte Español: Eleganza Extravaganza (Spanish Art: Eleganza Extravaganza); Challenge Winner: Pupi Poisson; Bottom Two: Hugáceo Crujiente and Killer Queen; Lip-Sync Song: "Espectacular" by Fangoria; Eliminated: Hugáceo Crujiente; Farewell Message: "SI NO ME ENTENDÉIS, ¡IRSE! HUGÁCEO CRUJIENTE" ("IF YOU DON'T GET ME, GET OUT! HUGÁCEO CRUJIENTE")
6	6	"Drags de la Comedia"	4 July 2021
For this week's mini-challenge, the queens have a bitchfest with puppets. Carmen Farala wins the mini-challenge. For the main challenge, the queens perform a roast of the judges. On the runway, category is La Noche de las Mil Rosalía's (Night of a Thousand Rosalía's). Carmen Farala and Killer Queen receive positive critiques, with Carmen Farala winning the challenge. Dovima Nurmi, Pupi Poisson and Sagittaria receive negative critiques, with Pupi Poisson being safe. Dovima Nurmi and Sagittaria lip-sync to "Aute Cuture" by Rosalía. Sagittaria wins the lip-sync and Dovima Nurmi sashays away.: Guest Judge: Susi Caramelo; Mini-Challenge: Everybody Loves Puppets; Mini-Challenge Winner: Carmen Farala; Mini-Challenge Prize: A gift card to use in Ribes & Casals shops; Main Challenge: Perform a roast of the judges; Runway Theme: La Noche de las Mil Rosalía's (Night of a Thousand Rosalía's); Challenge Winner: Carmen Farala; Bottom Two: Dovima Nurmi and Sagittaria; Lip-Sync Song: "Aute Cuture" by Rosalía; Eliminated: Dovima Nurmi; Farewell Message: "OS AMO ZORRAS CARMEN LA CORONA ES TUYA! ♡" ("I LOVE YOU BITCHES CARMEN THE CROWN IS YOURS! ♡")
7	7	"Final Four" "Titanes del drag"	11 July 2021
For this week's mini-challenge, the queens apply makeup without mirrors. Carmen Farala wins the mini-challenge. For the main challenge, the queens makeover rugby players from the LGBTI+ inclusive club Madrid Titanes. On the runway, category is Furia de Titanas (Fury of the Titans). Carmen Farala wins the challenge. Killer Queen, Pupi Poisson and Sagittaria are announced as the bottom three. They lip-sync to "Cuando tú vas" by Chenoa. Killer Queen and Sagittaria win the lip-sync and Pupi Poisson sashays away.: Guest Judge: Envy Peru; Mini-Challenge: Apply makeup without mirrors; Mini-Challenge Winner: Carmen Farala; Main Challenge: Makeover rugby players from the LGBTI+ inclusive club Madrid Titanes; Runway Theme: Furia de Titanas (Fury of the Titans); Challenge Winner: Carmen Farala; Challenge Prize: Two-night stay, dinner and spa treatments for 2 at W Barcelona, for both the contestant and their makeover partner; Bottom Three: Killer Queen, Pupi Poisson and Sagittaria; Lip-Sync Song: "Cuando tú vas" by Chenoa; Eliminated: Pupi Poisson; Farewell Message: "TODAS SOIS GANADORAS SED FELICES (PUPI POISSON)" ("YOU ARE ALL WINNERS BE HAPPY (PUPI POISSON)")
8	8	"The Reunion" "El reencuentro"	18 July 2021
The queens all return for the reunion. Discussions include, unseen footage of Drag Vulcano telling her teammates to stop joking around during rehearsal, Inti's decision to quit, Dovima Nurmi and Sagittaria's friendship and Dovima Nurmi refusing to lip-sync. It is then announced that Pupi Poisson is awarded this season's Miss Congeniality.: Miss Congeniality: Pupi Poisson; Miss Congeniality Prize: A cash prize of €3,000
9	9	"Grand Finale" "La gran final"	25 July 2021
For the final challenge of the season, the queens perform a dance routine and lip-sync to RuPaul's song "U Wear It Well". On the runway, category is Mi Mejor Look Drag (My Best Drag Look). The eliminated queens all return to the runway. The three finalists are told that they will be lip-syncing to "La Gata Bajo la Lluvia" by Rocío Dúrcal. It is announced that Carmen Farala is the winner, leaving Killer Queen and Sagittaria as the runners-up.: Main Challenge: Perform a dance routine and lip-sync to RuPaul's song "U Wear It Well"; Runway Theme: Mi Mejor Look Drag (My Best Drag Look); Lip-Sync Song: "La Gata Bajo la Lluvia" by Rocío Dúrcal; Runners-up: Killer Queen and Sagittaria; Winner of Drag Race España Season One: Carmen Farala
-	-	"Reaction from the Queen: España Season 1" "La coronación"	1 August 2021
The three finalists all return to watch the premiere of the season finale.
