= Hugo Marlo =

Spanish singer

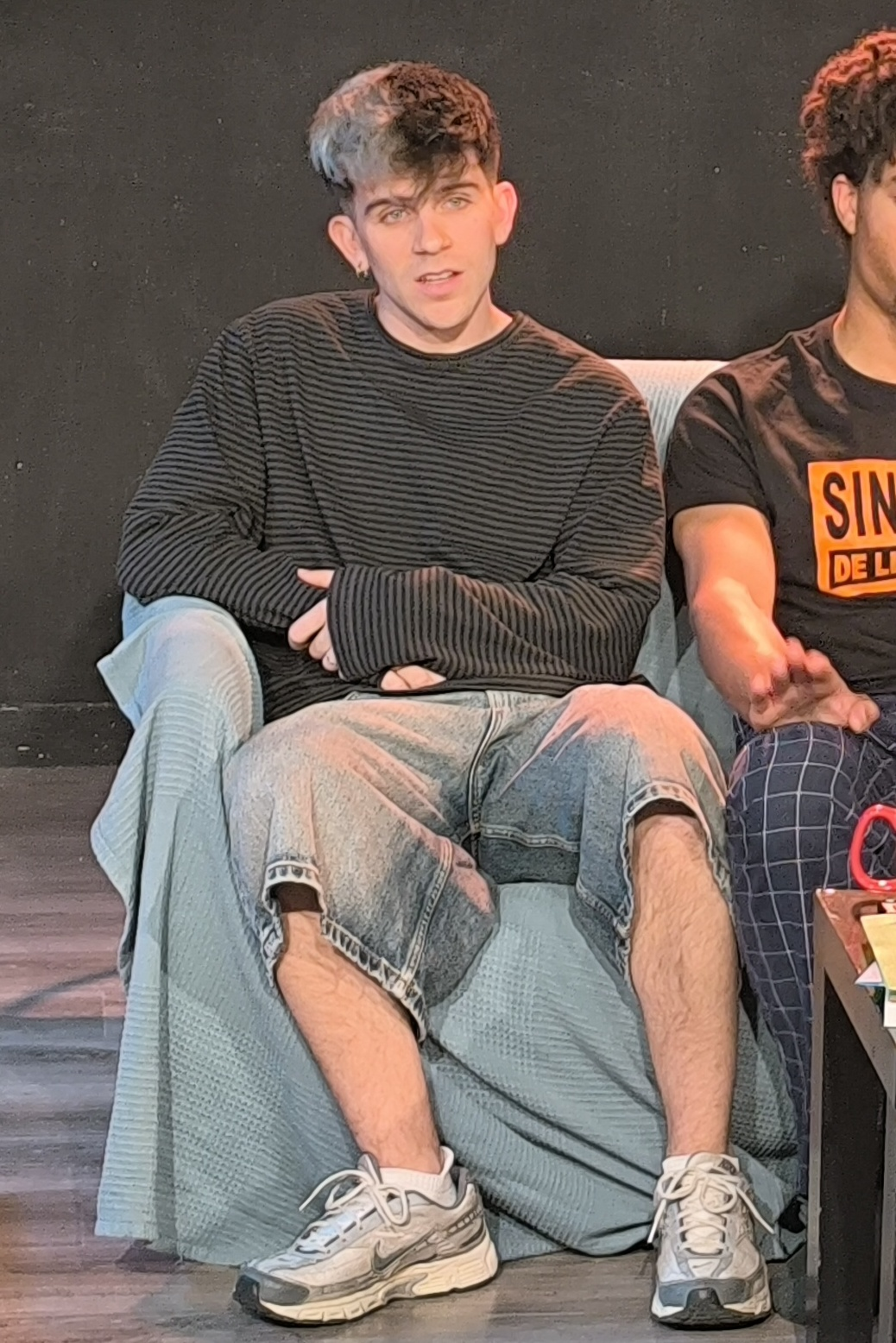
- Marlo in 2026
- Born: 6 April 2000 (age 26); Terrassa, Catalonia, Spain
- Occupations: Singer, footballer, trans-rights activist, and influencer

Hugo Marlo (born 6 April 2000) is a Spanish singer, footballer, and activist for trans rights, known for competing on the show Got Talent España.

== Career ==
Hugo Marlo became famous in 2017 after competing in the second season of the Spanish program Got Talent, before he had come out publicly as a trans man. Two years later, in 2019, he was also a contestant on La Voz.

In 2022 he had a lead role in the first episode of Reinas al rescate, a reality show in which a group of drag queens formed by Supremme de Luxe, Estrella Xtravaganza, Pupi Poisson and Sharonne come to help LGBT people from rural areas and confront the discrimination they face in their daily lives. In November of the same year, he came back to compete again on Got Talent, this time in its ninth season, in the adult section as an openly trans man.

On 17 May 2023 he performed at the Marquès Institute, specifically in the Assisted Reproduction clinic, due to this clinic specializing since 2019 in collaboration with LGBT people and couples to create families through assisted reproduction. During the same year, he co-founded Fénix FC, an association football team formed exclusively for trans men, being the first professional trans male football team in the history of Spain.

== Discography ==
=== Singles ===
Año	Título
2020	Oggi Sono Io (Cover)
2020	No Me Llames Más Así
2021	Me Olvidé de Mí
2021	Nadie Como Tú
2022	Dragon Khan
2023	Mil Voltes
