= Tavi Gallart =

Spanish actress, saxophonist, cabaretist and showwoman

- Origin: Valencia, Spain
- Genres: Cabaret; Copla; Cuplé; Musical film
- Occupations: Actress; showwoman; drag performer
- Instrument: Saxophone
- Years active: 1990s–present

Tavi Gallart is a Spanish actress, saxophonist, cabaret performer, and showwoman. Throughout her career, she has worked in film, theater companies, and as a drag performer, and has performed in Spain, Brazil, and Morocco.

== Early life and career ==
Tavi Gallart is a trans woman from Valencia, coming from several generations of musicians in her family. At age 9, she began performing with her first theatrical production, an adaptation of The Little Prince. In her teenage years, she began studying music and theater and started performing in cabarets.

On March 2, 2019, she performed in the town of Sagunto alongside renowned drag queen Supremme de Luxe in the show "Revístase caballero," which blended genres such as copla, cuplé, and cabaret.

In 2021, she played the role of Arrepentimiento in the film El fantasma de la sauna, for which she also produced the original song “Frágil,” recorded in collaboration with artists Supremme de Luxe and Pupi Poisson. The music video was filmed entirely in the iconic Sauna Paraíso in Madrid.

In August 2024, she performed as a saxophonist during Bilbao's Aste Nagusia (Semana Grande), delighting passersby attending the festivities. Following the success of her repertoire, she was interviewed by El Correo, after which she received numerous transphobic attacks and hate messages on social media.

== Filmography ==
=== Film ===
Year	Title	Role	Notes
2018	Daddy Dearest	David	Short film
2021	El fantasma de la sauna	Arrepentimiento	Feature film
