= Killer Queen (disambiguation) =

"Killer Queen" is a 1974 song by the British rock band Queen.

Killer Queen may also refer to:

- "Killer Queen" (Family Guy), an episode of the animated sitcom Family Guy which features the aforementioned song
- Killer Queen: A Tribute to Queen, a tribute album to the band Queen
- Killer Queen (video game), a 2013 video game
- Killer Queen (drag queen) (born 1989), Spanish drag queen
- Killer Queen, a Stand power used by the main antagonist Yoshikage Kira in Diamond Is Unbreakable from JoJo's Bizarre Adventure
- "Killer Queen", a storyline in the science fiction comedy webtoon series Live with Yourself!
- The Babysitter: Killer Queen, a 2020 American black comedy slasher film
- "Attack of the Killer Queen", a song from the soundtrack of the second chapter of Toby Fox's 2018 video game, Deltarune.
