= Sagittaria (drag queen) =

Spanish drag queen

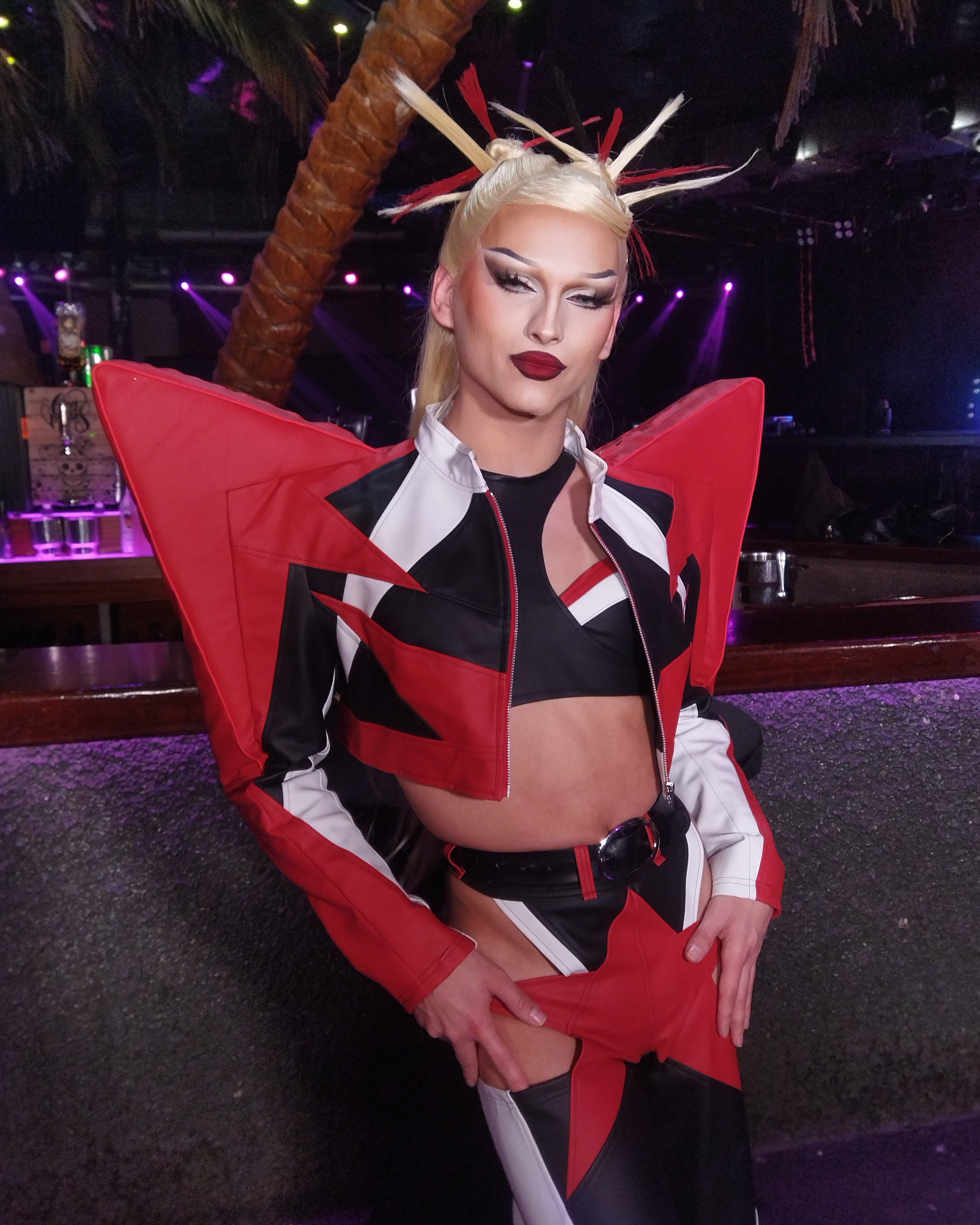
- Sagittaria in 2024
- Born: Iván Flores; July 13, 1998 (age 26); Barcelona, Spain
- Occupation: Drag queen
- Website: its-sagittaria.com

Sagittaria is the stage name of Iván Flores (born 13 July 1998), a Spanish drag queen best known for competing on the first seasons of Drag Race España and Drag Race España All Stars.

== Career ==
In 2021, Sagittaria was cast on the reality competition Drag Race España in its first season, which began airing on May 30, 2021. Her drag name was directly inspired by Aquaria, winner of the tenth season of the American series RuPaul's Drag Race, who named herself after her astrological sign, Aquarius. However, although Sagittaria's name is derived from the Sagittarius sign, her actual sign is Cancer. During her run on Drag Race, she won one challenge (improv comedy) and placed in the bottom twice, winning lip-syncs against Dovima Nurmi (whom she was previously roommates with) and Pupi Poisson, and eventually positioned herself as one of the three season finalists. The winner of the season was Carmen Farala, and Sagittaria placed as the co-runner up alongside Killer Queen.

After the end of the broadcast of the season, Sagittaria was part of the national tour of the Gran Hotel de las Reinas alongside her fellow contestants of the program, as well as host Supremme de Luxe. In 2022, she was part of the cast of the documentary Tacones sobre ruedas ("Heels on Wheels"), directed by Pau Canivell. On June 24, 2023, she performed at the LGBT Pride event in León. That same month, she participated in a photoshoot collaboration to demand LGBT rights along with a large number of fellow contestants from Drag Race España and RuPaul's Drag Race UK contestant Choriza May.

She cites her fashion influences to be the hairstyles of the 1950s, the fashion of the 1960s, Mugler, and Versace. Musically, her influences are Lady Gaga, Madonna and Kylie Minogue.

== Filmography ==
=== Television ===
Year	Title	Role	Notes
2021	Drag Race España (season 1)	Herself	Runner-Up
2022	Drag Race España (season 2)	Herself	Special guest; 2 episodes
2022	Sí lo digo	Herself	Guest
2024	Drag Race España All Stars	Herself	6th Place

== Discography ==
=== As featured artist ===
Year	Title	Album	Writer(s)	Producer(s)
2021	Divas (Las Metal Donnas Version)	Non-Album/ Single	N/A	Jeancy Auz
