= Dovima Nurmi =

Spanish drag queen (born 1996)

- Born: Rafael De Lorente; June 9, 1996 (age 29); Barcelona, Spain
- Occupation: Drag queen

Dovima Nurmi is the stage name of Rafael De Lorente (born 9 June 1996), a Spanish drag queen best known for competing on the first season of Drag Race España.

== Career ==
In 2021, Dovima Nurmi was cast on reality competition Drag Race España in its inaugural season, which began airing on May 30, 2021. In the sixth episode, she was nominated as one of the two worst performances of the episode alongside Sagittaria, so it was up to Dovima Nurmi to face her in a lip sync battle to fight to stay in the competition. Due to the friendship between the two, Dovima Nurmi refused to compete, giving the victory to Sagittaria and thus becoming the sixth elimination. After the show aired, Dovima Nurmi was part of the national tour of the Gran Hotel de las Reinas, together with the other contestants of the program and the presenter of the program, Supremme de Luxe.

Her drag name originates from a combination of the names of supermodel Dovima and actress Maila Nurmi, who was also known as the character “Vampira”. Dovima Nurmi describes her drag as "dark", "slutty", "elegant", and "meticulous", and has stated that her artistic inspirations are Disney villains such as Cruella de Vil and the Evil Queen.

== Public image ==
In 2021, after a statement by the Spanish singer La Pelopony in which she stated that, in the present day, homophobia no longer existed and called the LGBT community "catetos" (uncouth), Dovima Nurmi confronted her on social media, stating that if she had made a name for herself, that it was precisely thanks to the LGBT people who had supported her.

In September 2022, he positioned himself against the creation of the Drag Race España All Stars program, alleging that the supposed fame and money promised to the contestants was unfounded, and that it was only trying to hide the precarious employment situation that drag queens experience in Spain.

In 2023, during the broadcast of the third season of Drag Race Espana, Dovima Nurmi launched criticism against contestant and eventual winner Pitita, stating that she launched hurtful criticism against the contestants of the first season through YouTube videos, and criticized what Dovima Nurmi dubbed to be Pitita's "airs of grandeur". Regarding these accusations, Pitita publicly stated that she "did not negotiate with terrorists".
