= Arantxa Castilla-La Mancha =

Spanish drag performer (born 1997)

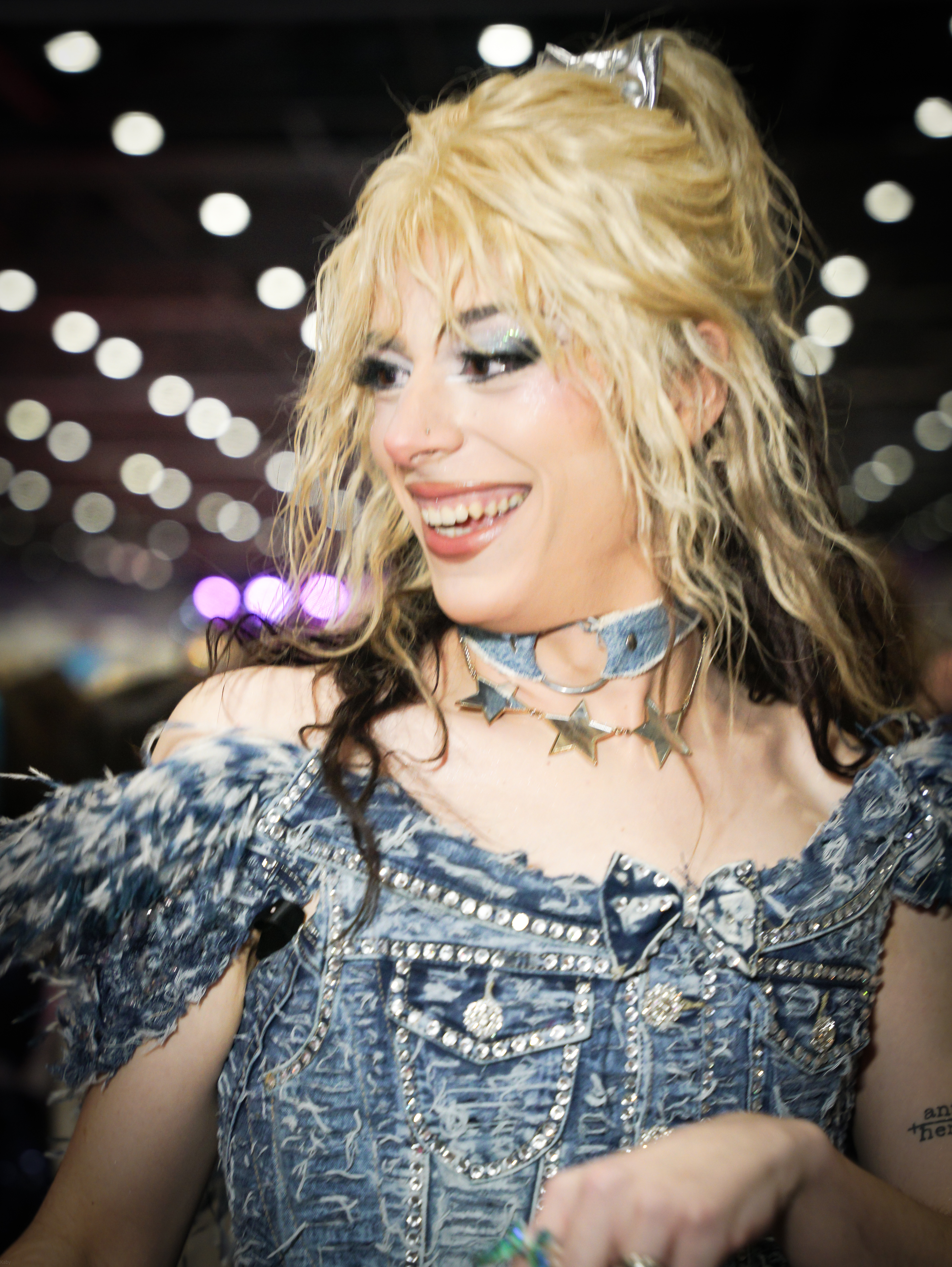
- Arantxa Castilla-La Mancha at RuPaul's DragCon UK, 2024
- Born: 1 December 1997 (age 28); Badajoz, Extremadura, Spain
- Other name: Alicia Maria Méndez García
- Occupations: Podcaster and drag queen

Arantxa Castilla-La Mancha is the stage name of Alicia María Méndez García (born 1 December 1997), a Spanish drag queen, podcaster, and trans woman.

== Early life ==
Méndez was born on 1 December 1997 in Badajoz, in the municipality of Extremadura in south-west Spain. She was raised in the small town of Jerez de los Caballeros. She claims that she experienced discrimination at an early age due to her sexual orientation and gender expression.

Her favourite television series as a child was Hannah Montana, the premise of which resonated with her and consequently served as an inspiration for both her drag name and her aesthetic. In an interview with the Spanish newspaper La Vanguardia, Méndez claimed that there was no connection between herself and the autonomous community of Castilla-La Mancha other than a penchant for manchego cheese, stating that a drag queen's job is to lie in order to create an illusion.

Méndez moved to Madrid at the age of 17 to study Audiovisual Communication. During her first year of studying, she was involved in class film project in which she portrayed a woman, claiming that this was something that she wanted to continue doing. It was also during her early years in Madrid that she experienced drag culture for the first time by watching a drag show hosted by Supremme de Luxe.

== Career ==
In 2021, Méndez competed in the first season of the reality television series, Drag Race España. After the season aired, she joined the national tour Gran Hotel de las Reinas along with other participants from the series. The tour was hosted by Supremme de Luxe and vedette Paca la Piraña.

Following her appearance on Drag Race, she has worked as an ambassador of the high-heel race at Madrid Pride, and is an hostess for Jerez de los Caballeros Pride, a pride event in her hometown.

On 13 January 2024, it was announced that she would be one of the contestants on the second series of RuPaul's Drag Race: UK vs. the World. She was crowned Miss Congeniality in the finale episode of the season.

Méndez also hosts a podcast with fellow drag queen Hugáceo Crujiente, Mientras Te Hacías El Eyeliner (While You Were Doing Your Eyeliner).

== Personal life ==
Despite originally identifying as non-binary, Méndez came out as a trans woman in December 2022. As of 2024 she was based in Madrid.

== Controversy ==
During her appearance on Drag Race España, Méndez received strong criticism from viewers, which led to her receiving abuse and death threats through social media.

In 2022, both she and Hugáceo Crujiente were involved in a public argument with drag queen Sagittaria, who accused both of treating their fans poorly, not having work, and for poor performance in their shows.

== Filmography ==
=== Film ===
Year	Title	Role	Credits
2021	Una Navidad con Samantha Hudson	Drag Queen	Supporting role

=== Television ===
Year	Title	Role	Credits
2021	Meet the Queens	Herself	1 episode
2021	Drag Race España	Herself	8 episodes
2021	Tras la carrera	Herself	1 episode
2022	Maestros de la costura	Herself	1 episode
2024	RuPaul's Drag Race: UK Versus the World	Herself	3 episodes
