= Fénix FC (Catalonia) =

- Founded: 2023
- Website: Instagram
Home colours

Fénix FC is a Spanish football team consisting entirely of trans men, The team was founded by Hugo Marlo after being forced out of the women's league once he began hormone therapy based in Sant Feliu de Llobregat, Catalonia.

Fenix played friendly matches against other regional teams during the 2024 pre-season. The team played their first official match against Palleja CF B on 21 September 2024, and lost 19-0. The players are working on getting back in shape after having to leave the teams they played in before their transition.
