= Drag Vulcano =

Spanish drag performer

- Born: Isidro Javier Pérez Mateo
- Occupation: Drag performer
- Television: Drag Race España

Drag Vulcano is the stage name of Isidro Javier Pérez Mateo, a Spanish drag performer from Las Palmas who competed on season 1 of Drag Race España.
