= Hugáceo Crujiente =

Spanish drag performer (born 1995)

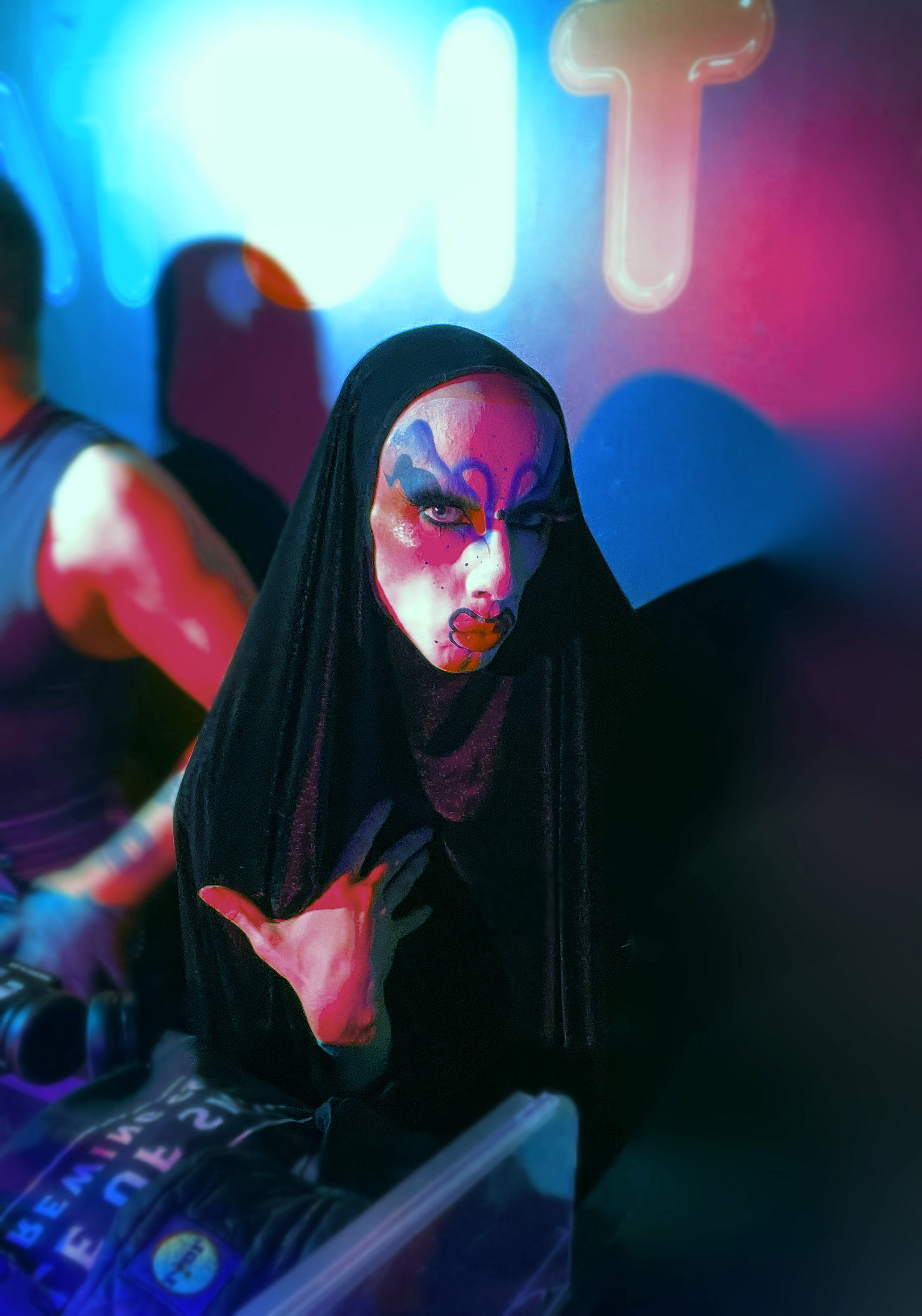
- Hugáceo Crujiente at an event in Granada in June 2024
- Born: Hugo Díaz; 2 December 1995 (age 30); Getafe, Spain
- Occupation: Drag queen
- Television: Drag Race España (season 1)
- Website: https://www.bycrujiente.com/

Hugo Díaz (born 2 December 1995), known professionally as Hugáceo Crujiente, is a Spanish drag performer, designer, podcaster, and multidisciplinary artist, who rose to fame for competing on the first season of Drag Race España.

== Early life and education ==
Díaz was born on 2 December 1995. Their place of birth is unclear, with Díaz's birthplace not definitively confirmed. Díaz has indicated on social media that they are from Getafe, Madrid, although some sources suggest that they are from Valencia.

They studied Illustration at the Casa de los Picos, an arts and design school (EASD) located in Segovia, followed by Graphic Design at the EASD in Valencia.

== Career ==
In 2019, Díaz participated in a discussion entitled Juventuts Trans –formadores. Més enllà del binarisme (Young Transformers. Beyond Binarism) with the Consell Valencià de la Joventut, the youth council in Valencia.

In 2021, Díaz competed on the first season of Drag Race España. They were declared the winner in the first episode but were later eliminated in the fifth episode after losing a lip-sync battle against Killer Queen to "Espectacular" by Fangoria. Despite not appearing in the sixth episode, which featured a Rosalía-themed catwalk, Diáz showed their proposed look on social media, which received praise from the singer.

In February 2022, Díaz competed in the Gala Drag Queen de Las Palmas de Gran Canaria, a drag event that forms part of the annual Carnival of Las Palmas held in Las Palmas, Gran Canaria. In May of that same year, they launched the podcast Mientras Te Hacías El Eyeliner (While You Were Doing Your Eyeliner) with fellow drag queen Arantxa Castilla-La Mancha.

In July 2022, the Thyssen-Bornemisza Museum announced a collaboration with Díaz to create a parade as part of Madrid Pride. Díaz's contribution included a bus covered in reinterpretations of seven of the museum's most iconic works, showcasing representations of queer love.

In November 2022, Díaz appeared in the music video for "Lágrimas de Ángel" by Spanish singer Mónica Naranjo. The following month, they were interviewed by the Spanish online television, news, and entertainment publication, El Televisero, discussing their career and opinions of the third season of Drag Race España.

== Personal life ==
Díaz identifies as non-binary and uses he, she, and they pronouns.

== Controversy ==
In 2022, both Díaz and Arantxa Castilla-La Mancha were involved in a public argument with drag queen Sagittaria, who accused both of treating their fans poorly, not having work, and for poor performance in their shows.

== Filmography ==
=== Television ===
Year	Title	Role	Credits
2021	Drag Race España	Participant	6 episodes
2022	Maestros de la costura	Guest	1 episode
2022	Drag Race España	Guest	1 episode
2022	The Route	La Emperatriz	1 episode

=== Podcast ===
Year	Title	Role
2022 -	Mientras Te Hacías El Eyeliner	Host

=== As Featured Artist ===
Year	Title	Album	Writer(s)	Producer(s)
2021	Divas (Las Metal Donnas Version)	Non-Album/ Single	N/A	Jeancy Auz
