= Lara Sajen =

Spanish singer

- Lara Sajén Fleitas
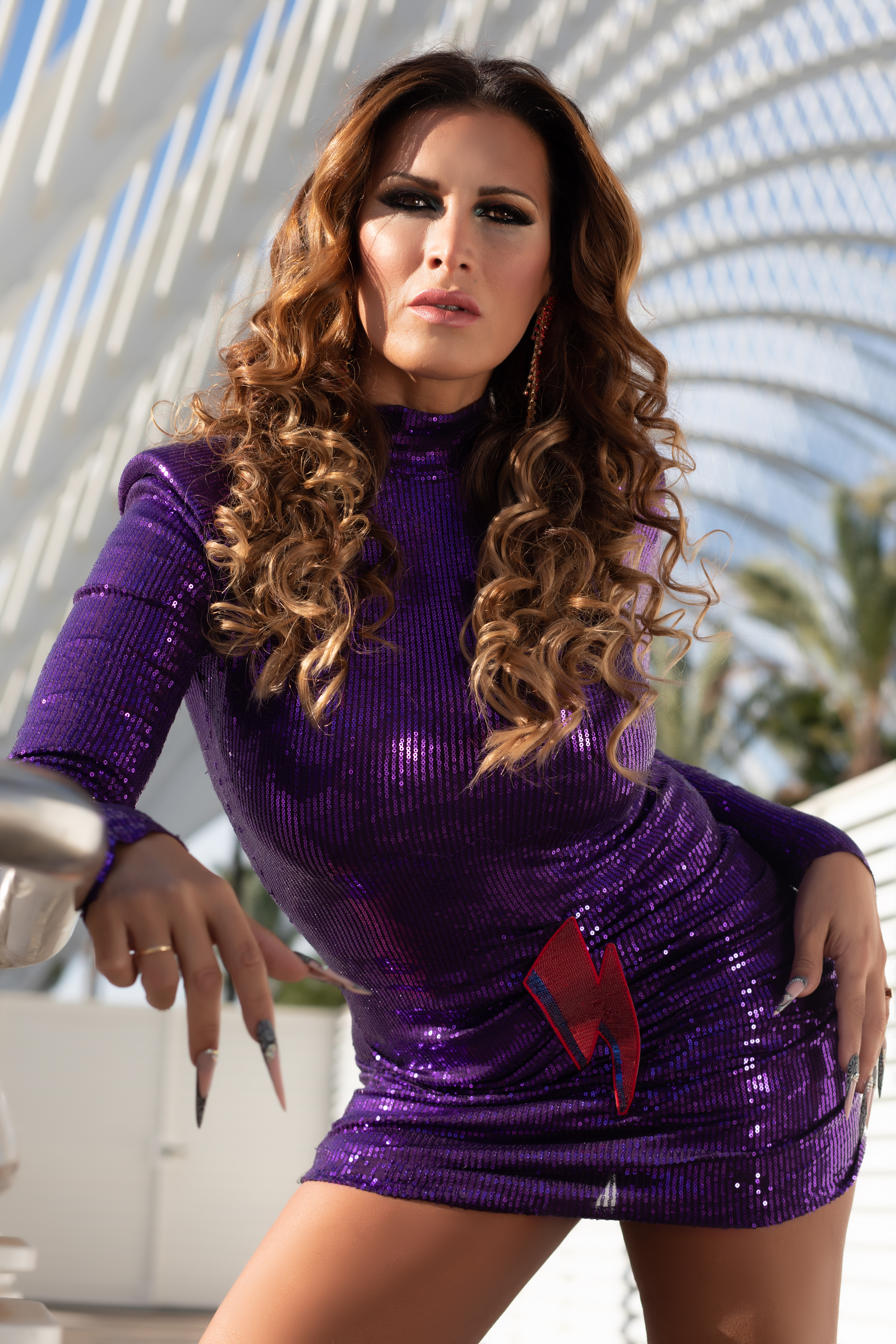
- Lara Sajen in 2020
- Born: 22 September 1977 (age 48); Campana, Argentina
- Occupations: Singer and dancer

Lara Sajén Fleitas, known as Lara Sajen, (Campana, 22 September 1977), is an Argentinian dancer, singer, and reality show contestant.

== Biography ==
She was born Campana, Buenos Aires 22 September 1977. After working as a dancer in Argentina, she migrated to Spain in May 2004. She established herself in Madrid, to perform in dance shows. She performed on stages in the neighborhood Chueca.

She was a dancer with the music group Fangoria for 10 years.

After participating in some film and television productions, standing out as an advisor in 2014 in Mujeres y Hombres y Viceversa, she rose to fame in 2019 as a contestant on the fashion design reality show on La1 from RTVE, where she was in fourth place.

IN 2021 she participated in Supervivientes in Honduras.

== Discography ==
=== EP ===
- Y tú de qué vas? (2014)

=== Singles ===
- Escandalosa (2014)
- Peligrosa (2015)
- Furiosa
- Poderosa
- Pomposa
- Ojos de fuego
- Me rindo sin combatir

== Filmography ==
=== Films ===
Year	TItle	Character	Notes
2015	A cambio de nada	Sex worker	

=== Television ===
Year	Title	Character	Notes
2014	Fantasmagórica	Cuqui	
2018	Me cambio de apellido	Herself	
2019	Maestros de la costura	Contestant	9th expelled
2021	Supervivientes	Contestant	10th expelled
2023	Solos/Solas	Contestant	7 days
