= Reinas al Rescate =

Spanish documentary series

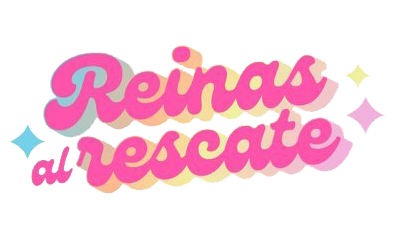
- Also known as: Queens to the Rescue
- Genre: Documentary series
- Inspired by: We're Here; Queer Eye
- Starring: Supremme de Luxe; Pupi Poisson; Sharonne; Estrella Xtravaganza
- Opening theme: "Eres tan travesti" by La Prohibida
- Country of origin: Spain
- Original language: Spanish
- No. of seasons: 1
- No. of episodes: 6

Original release
- Network: ATRESplayer Premium
- Release: 10 July – 12 November 2022

Reinas al Rescate (English: Queens to the Rescue) is a reality documentary series featuring the host and judge of Drag Race España: Supremme de Luxe, with its former contestants: Sharonne, Pupi Poisson, and Estrella Xtravaganza. The series is available through Atresplayer Premium and started to premiere on 10 July 2022.

In the series, the four drag queens travel across Spain meeting members of the LGBT community, based in rural areas and bringing visibility to the experiences of LGBTQ people who live outside large cities. It is a loose adaptation of the Americans shows We're Here and Queer Eye.

== Background ==
Each episode focuses on the story of an individual who has called on the queens for support with an LGBTQ-related issue. The queens speak to the protagonist and the people around them about their experiences and offer help and guidance. Each episode ends with a local drag event featuring the protagonist and two of their friends or family members to raise awareness of LGBTQ issues among rural communities.

== Episodes ==
| No. in season | Title | Original release date |
|---|---|---|
| 1 | "Hugo, en Roda de Barà" | 10 July 2022 |
Hugo has identified as a boy for as long as he can remember. As a child, his family encouraged him to express himself freely, but this stopped when he reached puberty. Coming out as trans to his parents was difficult, and put a strain on his relationship with his father, Germán. Hugo was made fun of by others in his hometown, and could not leave the house for long periods. Hugo has asked the queens to help him reconnect with Germán and to regain his self-confidence. He is accompanied on stage by his father and his trans friend Lucía.
| 2 | "Jordi, en Benilloba" | 21 August 2022 |
Jordi is openly gay and lives happily in the town where his environment has always accepted him. However, he is not happy since he has not dared to confess something that only his mother knows for years: he is a carrier of undetectable HIV. This situation makes him feel in the closet again and makes it difficult for him to find a partner. He would like the queens to help him communicate his illness without it implying the rejection of the whole world.
| 3 | "Claudia y Virginia, en Linares" | 18 September 2022 |
Claudia and Virginia are two homosexual sisters who are fed up with living in Linares, an unwelcoming town where their initiatives are boycotted, where they cannot leave the environment and find safe spaces for the LGTBIQ+ collective. They want the queens to help them make the population aware of the importance of living in an inclusive society. With them will be their friend Bianca, a transgender girl who was forced to leave the town to avoid being attacked; as well as David, a bar owner who has also been harassed for hosting an LGBT+ Pride party.
| 4 | "Llorenç, en Cálig" | 23 October 2022 |
The years of bullying he suffered at school and high school, along with the lack of support at home, led Llorenç to make the decision to leave their hometown. Now, he returns to Calig with the intention of being able to openly express their non-binary identity, even though this may further jeopardise the relationship with their parents. They hopes that the queens will help them reconcile with both their past and the place where they grew up. He is accompanied on stage by his father, Lorenzo, and Salva, who was the first member of the gay community to go public with his sexual orientation in the town.
| 5 | "Kande, en Landete" | 20 November 2022 |
Kande, despite having recognised his identity as a non-binary trans person and having communicated his preference for male pronouns some time ago, in his village and to his mother, Josefa, is still known as Candela. Overwhelmed by the feeling that no one truly recognises him, he seeks the help of the queens to free himself from the identity of "Candela" and begin to live authentically and respectfully in his environment. On stage, he will be accompanied by his mother, if she is willing to accept that she no longer has a daughter, and his great friend Angelita, who, despite having always been present in his life, would never imagine what he is about to reveal to her.
| 6 | "José Antonio, en Campaspero" | 12 November 2022 |
José Antonio is gay and living with HIV, yet he has never been able to fully accept himself due to a lack of support both in his local community and at home. His family is present in his life, but his sexual orientation and medical condition are sensitive issues that no one dares to mention. In fact, his communication with his father and brother is practically non-existent. He feels alone and full of insecurities, unable to face the judgements and gossip of his neighbours. The only time he experiences happiness is when he performs as a drag queen in Valladolid. His wish is that the queens will help him re-establish his relationship with his family, regain his confidence and live in Campaspero with the freedom he longs for. In an unexpected twist, his brother Rubén will join him on stage, and he will also be accompanied by his cousin Alicia, a transgender woman who lives in the same town and enjoys the acceptance and freedom he seeks.
