= Killer Queen (drag queen) =

Spanish drag performer and doctor

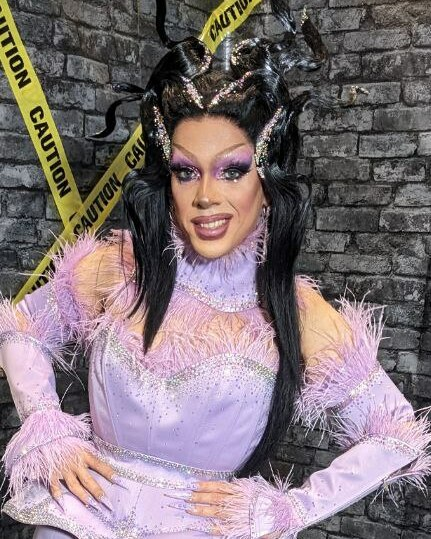
- Killer Queen at RuPaul's DragCon UK, 2023
- Born: Iván Solar Gil; 2 February 1989 (age 37); Madrid, Spain
- Occupations: Drag queen; Doctor
- Television: Drag Race España (season 1)
- Website: iamthekillerqueen.com

Killer Queen is the stage name of Iván Solar Gil (born 2 February 1989), a Spanish retired drag performer and doctor most known for competing on the first season of Drag Race España, where she finished as runner-up to Carmen Farala and alongside Sagittaria.

== Biography ==
Iván Solar Gil was born on 2 February 1989, in Madrid, Spain. From a young age, he was very involved in his neighborhood church, and even taught catechism until his expulsion. He is a doctor specializing in family and community medicine, and works as an emergency room doctor in the Community of Madrid.

=== Artistic career ===
In 2019, Killer Queen released the singles "No eres como yo" (You're not like me) and "Karma" with fellow Drag Race España contestant Ariel Rec. The next year, she represented Spain as a participant in the drag contest Latin Drag Race International.

In 2021, she was announced as a contestant in the first season of Drag Race España, premiering in May 2021. Killer obtained her first win on the show in the season's fourth episode, and was up for elimination in the next episode, for which she had to compete in a lip sync to the song "Espectacular" by Fangoria against castmate Hugáceo Crujiente, who was eliminated. Killer made it to the season finale, competing in a lip sync for the crown to the song "La gata bajo la lluvia" by Rocío Dúrcal against Sagittaria and Carmen Farala.

On 26 October of the same year, she appeared in the music video "My Pussy Is Like a Peach" by Choriza May, together with national and international drag artists like Kika Lorace and The Macarena.

In July 2024, Killer Queen announced her intent to retire from drag after performing for 10 years. Her final in-drag appearance occurred in Madrid on December 7 of that year.

=== Activism ===
Killer Queen has claimed that "drag is political". She has also denounced the fact that many other drag queens have received offers of work in exchange for not taking a political stance.

In 2021, the Transgender Association of Andalucía-Sylvia Rivera (la Asociación Trans de Andalucía-Sylvia Rivera) awarded Killer the T Prize for her medical work and commitment to the LGBTI community.

In July 2022, for Pride Month, the Parliamentary Socialist Group invited Killer Queen to a round table about media in Spain's lower house of congress, the Congreso de los Diputados.

== Filmography ==
=== Television ===
Year	Title	Role	Notes
2021	Drag Race España	Finalist	11 episodes
2022	La Roca	Guest	1 episode
2022	Maestros de la costura	Guest	1 episode
2022	Drag Race España	Guest	2 episodes

== Theater ==
- Gran Hotel de las Reinas

== Discography ==
=== Singles ===
Year	Title	Feat.
2019	"No eres como yo"	Ariel Rec
2019	"Karma"	Ariel Rec
2021	"DRAG POWER"	Ariel Rec

=== Featured Singles ===
Year	Title	Album	Writer(s)	Producer(s)
2021	Divas (Las Metal Donnas Version)	Non-Album/ Single	N/A	Jeancy Auz
