= Kika Lorace =

Spanish singer, actress and drag queen

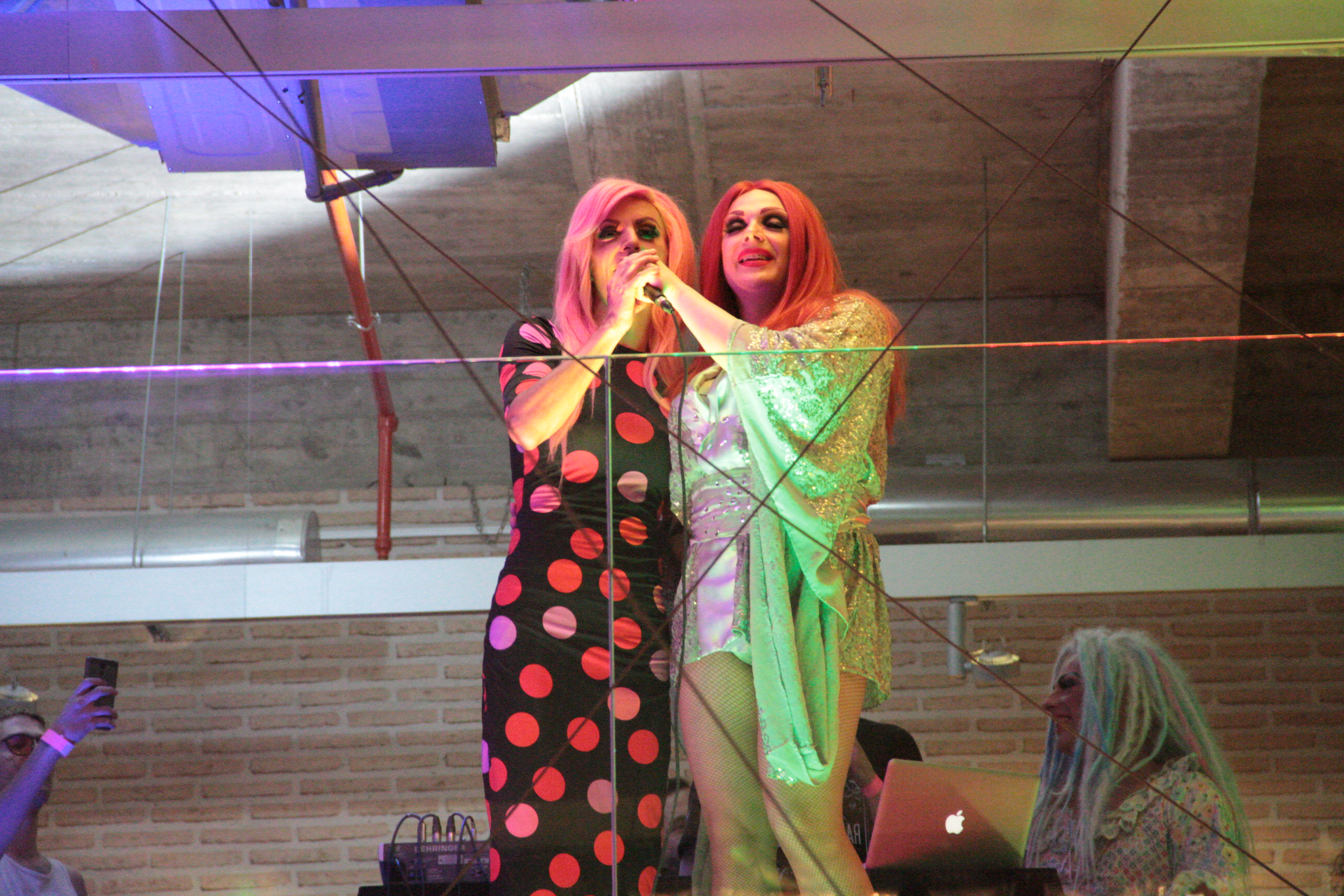
Kika Lorace (left) performing with Supremme de Luxe (right) at Madrid Pride in 2017

Kika Lorace (born 17 June 1983) is a Spanish singer, DJ, drag queen, and actress.

== Biography ==
Kika Lorace began her career as a drag queen in 2009, performing in nightclubs in Chueca. One of her most recognized hits is "Chueca es genial", released in 2015 via YouTube. She later released "Adiós Botella", a song dedicated to the end of Ana Botella’s term as Mayor of Madrid, which reached nearly 500,000 views in three days.

In 2017, she received the Triángulo Award from COGAM for her career and activism for the LGTBI community. That same year she released "La Reina del Grindr", which garnered more than 2.7 million views on YouTube.

For WorldPride Madrid 2017, Kika Lorace launched her music video "Chica, welcome to Madrid".

In 2018 she performed in the Drag Queen Gala of Las Palmas de Gran Canaria.

In 2020, she performed alongside various artists in the official LGTBI pride anthem, "Piensa en positivo".

As an actress, Kika Lorace has appeared in series such as La que se avecina, appearing in most episodes of the ninth season in the role of Superlativa, and in the web series Looser. She also starred in the 10-episode web series Dulces Pesadillas.

For several years, she has directed and hosted in the Chueca district in Madrid the contest Mamá quiero ser travesti, where young drag art hopefuls compete to become the Drag Queen of the Year.

In 2021 she appeared as a guest on the Snatch Game of Drag Race España, the Spanish version of RuPaul's Drag Race, broadcast on Atresplayer.

== Discography ==
Singles

- Colgando en tus manos Trailer - 2009
- Super Disco Chino - 2012 with Orion Bow
- Roar (Mashup Que me coma el tigre) - 2014
- Chueca es genial - 2015
- Adiós Botella - 2015
- El partido de la amistad - 2015
- Arriba, Maricón - 2016
- Chica, Welcome to Madrid - 2017
- La Reina del Grindr - 2018
- Toro - 2018 with Allen King
- Resaca - 2018
- ¿Un novio? Yo paso - 2019
- Orgullos perdidos - 2020 with Keunam
- La nochebuena - 2021
- ¡Qué pesá! - 2022
