= Carmen Farala =

Spanish drag performer

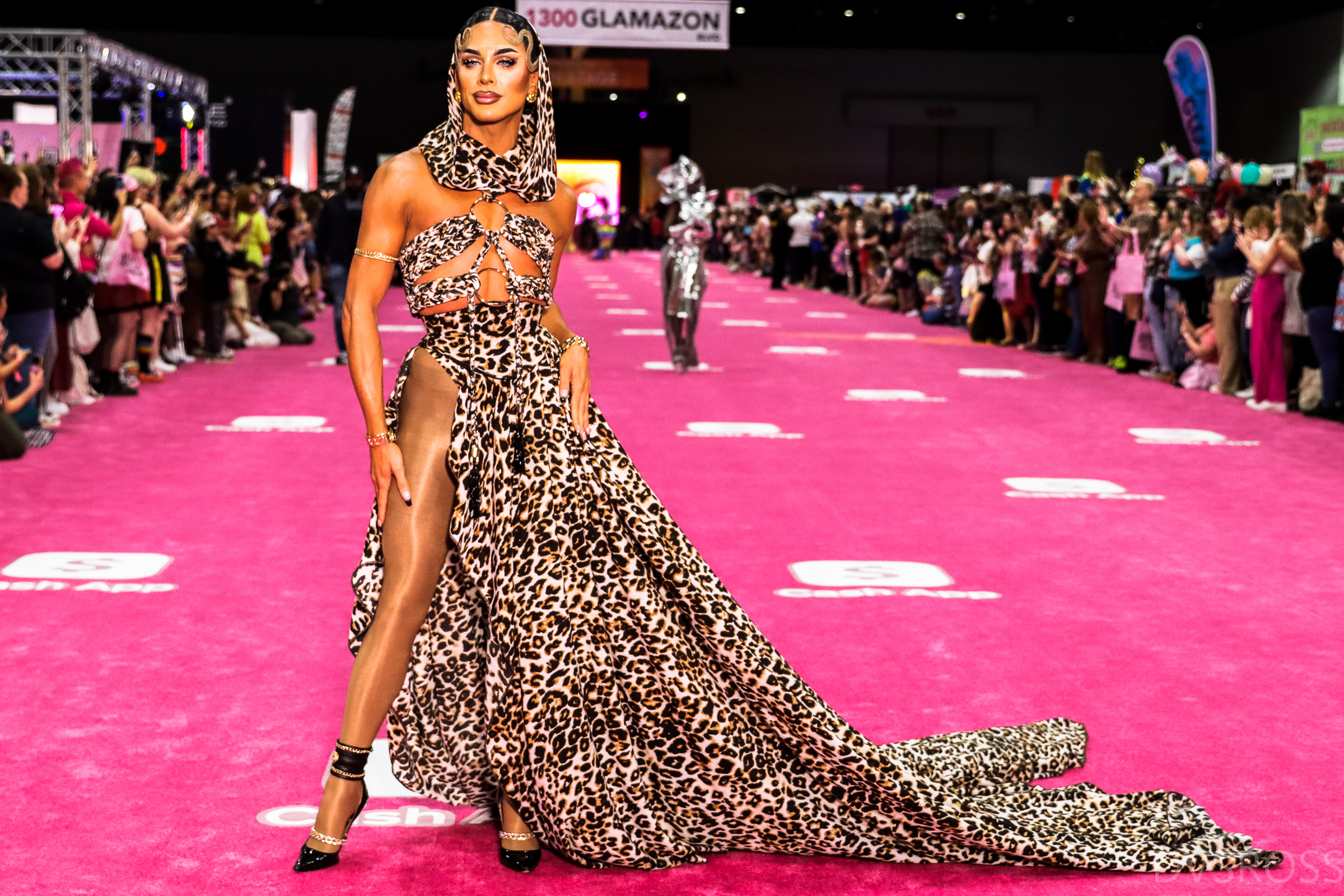
- Carmen Farala at RuPaul's DragCon LA, 2023
- Born: Daniel Mora Rojas; November 4, 1989 (age 36); Seville, Andalusia, Spain
- Occupation: Drag queen
- Television: Drag Race España
- Website: carmenfarala.com

Carmen Farala is the stage name of Daniel Mora Rojas (born November 4, 1989), a Spanish drag performer best known for winning the first season of Drag Race España.

== Early life ==
Mora was born in Seville, Spain.

== Career ==
Carmen Farala competed on and won the first season of Drag Race España. She is a part of the drag singing-dancing girl group "Hermanas Farala".

== Personal life ==
Mora lives in Madrid, as of 2021.

== Filmography ==
=== Television ===
Year	Title	Role	Notes
2021	Drag Race España (season 1)	Herself	Winner
2022	Maestros de la costura	Herself	Guest; 1 episode
2022	Drag Race España (season 2)	Herself	Special guest; 2 episodes

=== Web series ===
Year	Title	Role	Notes	Ref
2021	CoverGirl by XMAG	Herself	Guest	
2021	Secretos de Belleza by Vogue España	Herself	Guest	
2022	Los Replicantes	Herself	Guest	
2022	17 tips by Glamour México y Latinoamérica	Herself	Guest	
2022	10 Esenciales by GQ España	Herself	Guest with Sharonne	

== Discography ==
=== As Featured Artist ===
Year	Title	Album	Writer(s)	Producer(s)
2021	Divas (Las Metal Donnas Version)	Non-Album/ Single	N/A	Jeancy Auz
