= Pupi Poisson =

Spanish drag performer

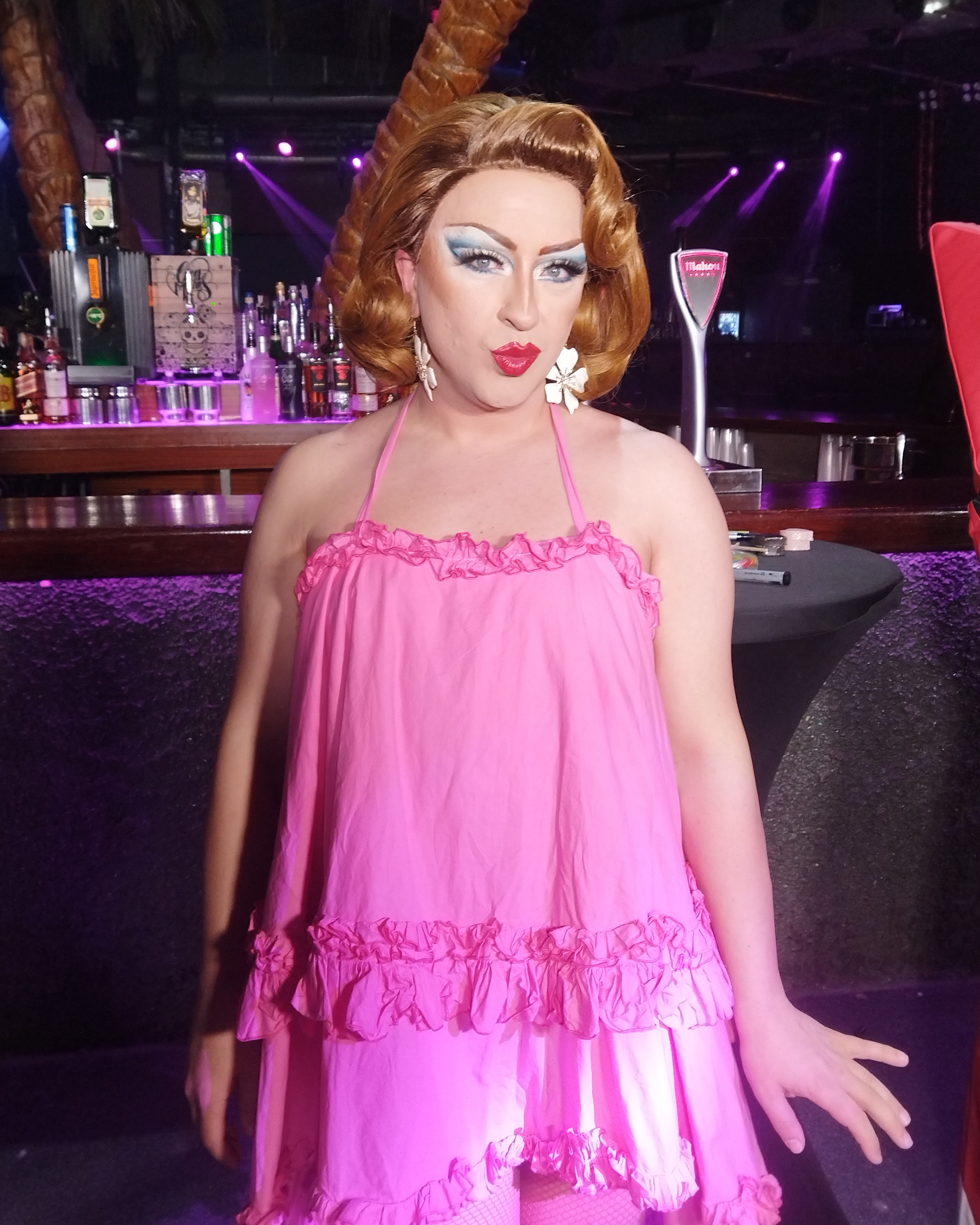
- Pupi Poisson in 2024
- Born: Alberto Cifuentes Gomez Zimmer; 2 April 1982 (age 44)
- Occupation: Drag performer
- Television: Got Talent España; Drag Race España
- Website: pupipoisson.com

Pupi Poisson is the stage name of Alberto Cifuentes Gomez Zimmer (born 2 April 1982), a Spanish drag performer most known for competing on the first seasons of reality television series' Drag Race España and Drag Race España All Stars. They began as a drag performer in 2006.

== Career ==
Zimmer began performing in drag in 2006 following a stint at a theme park which helped him create the role of Pupi Poisson. In 2008 Poisson began to perform with other drag queens, and television appearances followed in 2010. Hes competed on Got Talent España as well as Drag Race España. In an interview with one of the judges on the show, Javier Calvo, he called her "very talented," and noted that he had been "working for a while."

From July to December 2021, Poisson was part of the show Gran Hotel de las Reinas, which toured Spain as the official tour of Drag Race España.

In 2022, Pupi began co-hosting Reinas al Rescate alongside Drag Race España host Supremme de Luxe and fellow contestants Estrella Xtravaganza and Sharonne. In the series, the four drag queens travel across Spain to recruit small-town residents to participate in one-night-only drag shows.

== Personal life ==
Zimmer lives in Madrid. He is gay, noting in a July 2021 interview that he hid it because he believed it would not be "well received" by his mother.

== Discography ==
=== Albums ===
- Pupi Poisson (2019)

=== Singles ===
- "Sex Dance Love" (2013)
- "Armas De Mujer" (2014)
- "Armas De Mujer" [Dmoreno Remix] (2014)
- "Tienes Tó La Cara (Bso) Umpp" (2017)
- "Inesperado" (2020)
- "Prima'S Song" (2020)
- "Ya Es Navidad 2020" (2020)

As featured artist

- "Kobritzska", Conchita Pelayo feat. Pupi Poisson (2019)
- "Inesperat", Jean Val feat. Pupi Poisson (2020)

== Filmography ==
=== Television ===
- ¿Quién quiere casarse con mi madre? (2013)
- Got Talent España (2017)
- Drag Race España (season 1) (2021) (4th Place and Miss Congeniality)
- Maestros de la costura (2022) (guest appearance)
- Drag Race España (2022-2025) (guest appearances)
- Reinas al Rescate (2022)
