= Supremme de Luxe =

Spanish actor, singer, television personality, drag performer (born 1979)

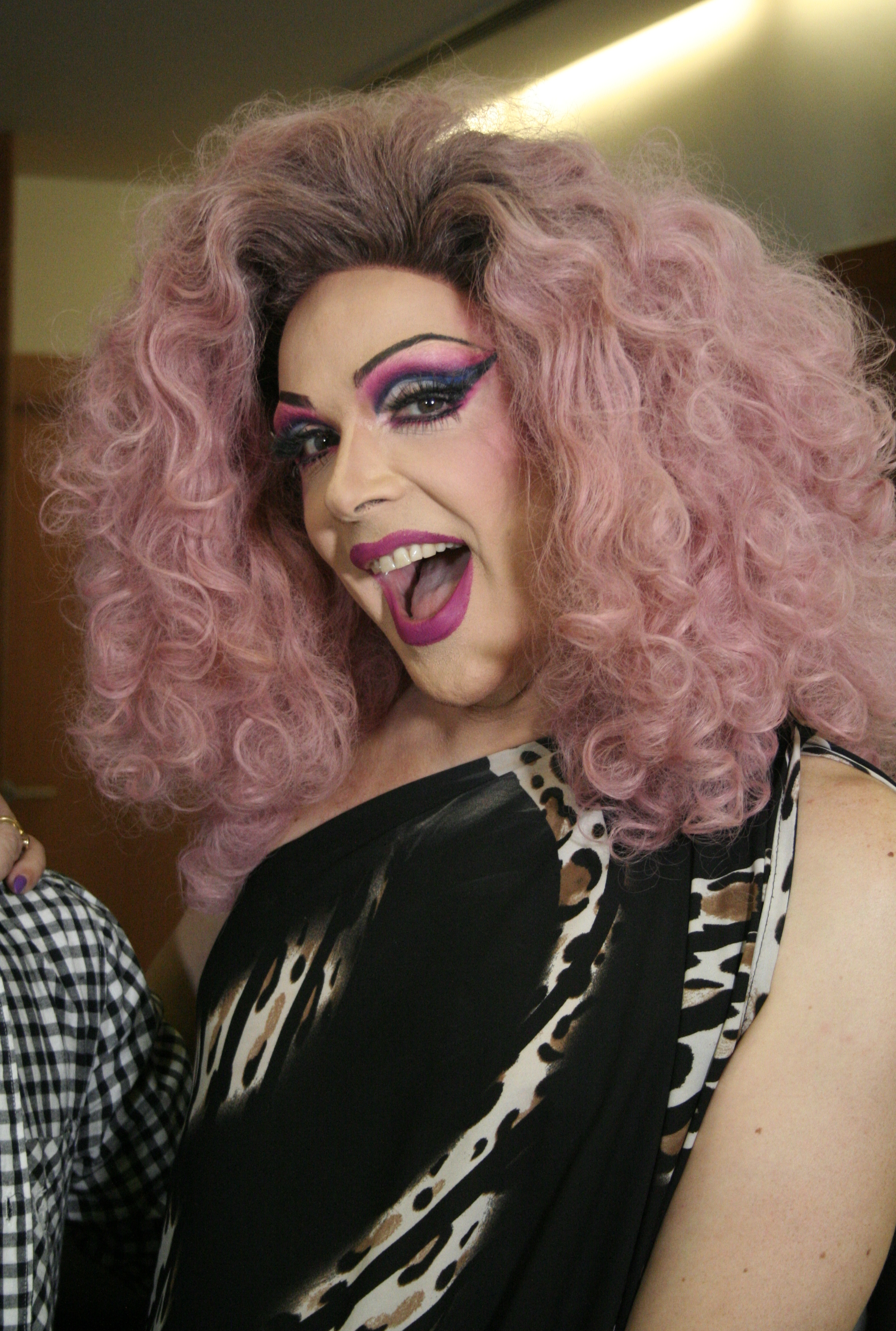
- Supremme De Luxe in 2022
- Born: Daniel Blesa; January 6, 1979 (age 47); Fuenlabrada, Spain
- Occupations: actor; singer; cabaret artist; drag queen; television personality
- Years active: 1997–present
- Known for: Drag Race España; Gran Hotel de las Reinas; Reinas al Rescate; ¡Que trabaje Rita!

YouTube information
- Channel: supremmedeluxe
- Subscribers: 8,830
- Views: 2.86 million
- Last updated: September 27, 2026
- Website: www.supremme.com

Daniel Blesa (born January 6, 1979), better known by the stage name Supremme de Luxe, is a Spanish actor, singer, cabaret artist, drag queen and television personality based in Madrid.

De Luxe was known across Spain for her theatrical, musical and cabaret performances before rising to international attention as the host and head judge of Drag Race España, the Spanish adaptation of RuPaul's Drag Race. She has subsequently appeared as the presenter of the Drag Race España stage show Gran Hotel de las Reinas and as co-host of Reinas al Rescate, an Atresmedia reality docuseries in which four drag queens support and bring visibility to members of the LGBTQ community living in rural parts of Spain.

== Early life ==
Blesa was born and raised in Fuenlabrada in the Community of Madrid. He started acting in local theatre at age 13.

As a child, Blesa wanted to be either an actor or a language and literature teacher. He started a degree in Spanish Language and Literature which he is currently finishing at the National University of Distance Education following a suspension of studies to focus on his acting career.

== Career ==
Blesa began acting professionally in 1994, specialising in theatrical performance. He has also been involved in a number of acting and writing projects in film, television and radio, and has taught youth theatre and cabaret performance.

Blesa's drag persona Supremme de Luxe was born on 20 December 1997 in Madrid, where she made a name for herself with almost daily performances in the bars and clubs of the Chueca district. Her club night ¡Que trabaje Rita! has helped shape the Madrid drag scene over the last decade, and has experienced wider success in Barcelona, Mexico and Paris. De Luxe has participated in all Madrid Pride parades since 2000, as well as in EuroPride 2007 and WorldPride 2017. She has hosted numerous events such as the Alcorcón Drag Queen Gala, Bakala.org's anniversary celebrations, the Bésametonto Awards, Mr. Bear Madrid/Mr. Bear España, and the International Gay and Lesbian Film Festival, as well as corporate events for brands like Red Bull and Ballantines. De Luxe's work references that of Spanish and international film actresses, and draws particular inspiration from Concha Velasco, Lola Herrera, Nacha Guevara, Liza Minnelli and Bette Midler. The name Supremme is a tribute to the American singer Diana Ross and her girl-group The Supremes. Years later, she was referred to as de Luxe by an acquaintance. The name stuck and she has grown to like it after being unsure of it initially.

De Luxe began releasing music in 2012. Her style is primarily 80s electropop, inspired by Blesa's favourite musical era. Her 2013 single "Miénteme" featured as part of the official soundtrack for WorldPride 2017.

De Luxe has appeared in two films directed by Luis Navarrete, a short film Daddy Dearest (2018) and a feature film The Phantom of the Sauna (2021). She has featured as a celebrity guest on Pasapalabra, and appears alongside Venedita von Dash and Lara Sajen on a special Pride edition of First Dates.

In 2021, it was announced that de Luxe would serve as the host and main judge of Drag Race España, with Ana Locking, Javier Ambrossi and Javier Calvo also on the judging panel. At the time of casting, de Luxe was receiving financial aid from the Spanish government scheme that supported self-employed workers during the coronavirus pandemic. Now hailed as the best-rated international version of RuPaul's Drag Race on IMDb, Drag Race España and its sister stage show Gran Hotel de las Reinas are in their second season. The show has been renewed for a third season due to air in 2023, and an All Stars edition has been also announced.

2022 saw the launch of Reinas al Rescate, an Atresmedia series co-hosted by de Luxe and Drag Race España contestants Estrella Xtravaganza, Pupi Poisson, and Sharonne. In the series, the four drag queens travel across rural parts of Spain to hear the experiences of LGBTQ community members who live outside big cities, share their stories, and organise local drag events to raise awareness of LGBTQ issues.

== Personal life ==
De Luxe declared herself a conscientious objector from military service in the Spanish Army at age 18.

== Discography ==
=== Albums ===
- Ahora Yo (2012)

=== Singles ===
- ¡Que Trabaje Rita! (2013, with La Prohibida, Rita Team & Asanza)
- Miénteme (2013)
- Perdiste Ya el Control (2014)
- Basta Ya (2015)
- Candy Shop (2015)
- Ener-G (2016)
- Gettin' High (2016)
- Fiebre 2017 (2017)
- No Sabe a Nada 2018 (2018)
- Poco Hombre para Mí (2018)
- Resurgiré (2019)
- Llévame al Cielo (2021)
- Inevitable (2022)

== Filmography ==
=== Film ===
Year	Title	Role	Notes	Ref.
2018	Queridísimo Papá (Daddy Dearest)	Oli	Short Film	
2021	El fantasma de la sauna (The Phantom of the Sauna)	Lujuria		

=== Television ===
Year	Title	Network	Notes	Ref.
2016	First Dates	Cuatro	Guest	
2021–present	Drag Race España	Atresplayer Premium (Spain); WOW Presents Plus (international)	Presenter and judge	
2022	Tu cara me suena	Antena 3	Guest	
2022	Pasapalabra	Antena 3	Guest	
2022	Reinas al Rescate	Atresplayer Premium	Presenter	
2022	Drag Race Italia (season 2)	Discovery+ (Italy); WOW Presents Plus (international)	Guest Judge	
2024-present	Drag Race España All Stars	Atresplayer Premium (Spain); WOW Presents Plus (international)	Presenter and judge	

=== Theatre ===
Year	Title	Role	Notes	Ref.
2012	Encerradas en un Pryconsa	Self	Theatre: DT Espacio Escénico	
2012	Ellas Cantan, ellas Cuentan	Self	Theatre: Artspacio Plotpoint	
2012	Transxformers	Self	Theatre: Navalmoral de la Mata (and Spanish/Argentinian tour)	
2013	¡Que Trabaje Rita!	Self	Theatre: Bodevil (and Spanish tour)	
2013	DK-Dence Cabaret	Self	Theatre: Sala Tarambana	
2013 - 2015	Oh! Strass – El Musical de Revista	Self	Theatres: Café Teatro Arenal de Madrid, Arlequín Gran Vía (and Spanish tour)	
2014 - 2016	Creep	Self	Theatre: El Burdel an Escena	
2018	Revístase Caballero	Self	Theatre: Centro Cultural Mario Monreal de Sagunto	
2019	A-Cuplé-jada	Self	Theatre: El Cinco de Velarde	
2020	Retromanía, el Espectáculo	Self	Theatre: DT Espacio Escénico	
2015 - 2021	Intimísimo	Self	Theatre: Sojo Laboratorio Teatral	
2021–present	Gran Hotel de las Reinas	Self	Drag Race España tour	
2022	La Llamada (Holy Camp!)	Dios	Special collaboration	
