= List of Industry characters =

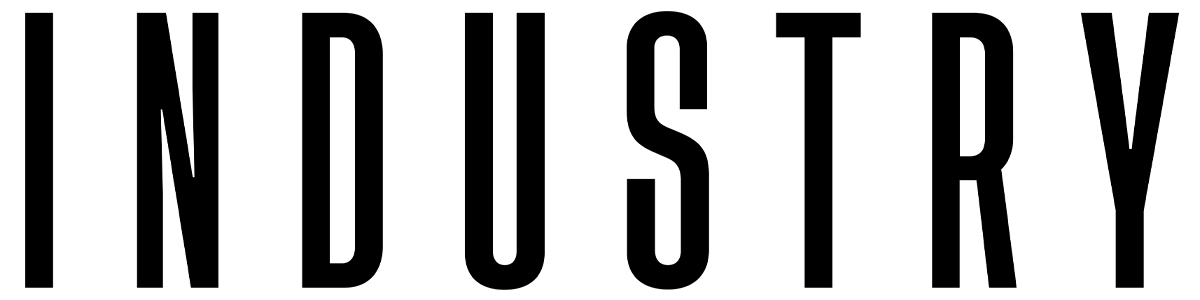

Industry is a British-American financial thriller drama series created by Mickey Down and Konrad Kay, which initially follows a group of young graduates competing for permanent positions at Pierpoint & Co, a prestigious investment bank in London. The show premiered on November 9, 2020 on HBO. It features an ensemble cast led by Myha'la, Marisa Abela, Ken Leung and Sagar Radia across all four seasons; Harry Lawtey and David Jonsson play leading roles in earlier seasons.

== Cast timeline ==
Key
Main cast (receives star billing) (Note: Credited when they appear.)
Recurring cast (guest appearances in two or more episodes)
Guest cast (appearing in one episode or credited as co-starring)

Actor	Character	Seasons			
Actor	Character	1	2	3	4
Main characters
Marisa Abela	Yasmin Kara-Hanani	Main	Main	Main	Main
Priyanga Burford	Sara Dhadwal	Main			
Mark Dexter	Hilary Wyndham	Main	Main		Main
Myha'la	Harper Stern	Main	Main	Main	Main
David Jonsson	Gus Sackey	Main	Main		
Harry Lawtey	Robert Spearing	Main	Main	Main	
Ben Lloyd-Hughes	Greg Grayson	Main		Main	
Conor MacNeill	Kenny Kilbane	Main	Main	Main	Main
Freya Mavor	Daria Greenock	Main	Guest	Guest	
Derek Riddell	Clement Cowan	Main			
Nabhaan Rizwan	Hari Dhar	Main (Note: Pilot only.)			
Will Tudor	Theo Tuck	Main			
Ken Leung	Eric Tao	Main	Main	Main	Main
Sarah Parish	Nicole Craig	Main	Main	Main	
Andrew Buchan	Felim Bichan	Main	Main		
Amir El-Masry	Usman Abboud	Main			
Sagar Radia	Rishi Ramdani	Recurring	Main	Main	Main
Caoilfhionn Dunne	Jackie Walsh	Recurring	Main	Guest	
Nicholas Bishop	Maxim Alonso	Recurring	Main	Main	
Trevor White	Bill Adler	Guest	Main	Main	
Indy Lewis	Venetia Berens	Guest	Main	Main	
Alex Akpobome	Daniel Van Deventer		Main		
Katrine De Candole	Celeste Pacquet		Main		
Jay Duplass	Jesse Bloom		Main		
Adam Levy	Charles Hanani		Main	Main	Guest
Sonny Poon Tip	Leo Bloom		Main		
Faith Alabi	Aurore Adekunle		Main	Main	
Elena Saurel	Anna Gearing		Main	Recurring	
Irfan Shamji	Anraj Chabra		Recurring	Main	Guest
Kit Harington	Henry Muck			Main	Main
Sarah Goldberg	Petra Koenig			Main	
Miriam Petche	Sweetpea Golightly			Main	Main
Andrew Havill	Alexander Norton			Main	Main
Roger Barclay	Otto Mostyn			Main	Main
Fiona Button	Denise Oldroyd			Main	
Eliot Salt	Caedi McFarlane			Main	
Georgina Rich	Wilhelmina Fassbinder			Main	Main
Tom Stourton	James Ashford			Main	Main
Fady Elsayed	Ali El Mansour			Main	
Gustav Lindh	Xander Lindt			Main	
Joel Kim Booster	Frank Wade			Main	
Asim Chaudhry	Vinay Sarkar			Main	
Harry Hadden-Paton	Tom Wolsey			Main	
Max Minghella	Whitney Halberstram				Main
Kiernan Shipka	Hayley Clay				Main
Charlie Heaton	Jim Dycker				Main
Toheeb Jimoh	Kwabena Bannerman				Main
Kal Penn	Jonah Atterbury				Main
Amy James-Kelly	Jennifer Bevan				Main
Edward Holcroft	Sebastian Stefanowicz				Main
Claire Forlani	Cordelia Hanani-Spyrka				Main
Jack Farthing	The Commander				Main
Susanne Wuest	Johanna Bauer				Main
Stephen Campbell Moore	Tony Day				Main
Pip Torrens	Kevin Rawle				Main
Recurring characters
Joshua James	Justin Klineman	Guest	Guest	Guest	
Ruby Bentall	Lucinda Young	Recurring	Guest		
Branden Cook	Todd Barber	Recurring			
Jonathan Barnwell	Seb Oldroyd	Recurring			
Helene Maksoud	Azar Kara	Recurring			
Alexandra Moen	Candice Allbright	Guest	Guest		Guest
Kåre Conradi	Kaspar Zenden	Recurring			
Brittany Ashworth	Diana Ramdani		Guest		
Emily Barber	Diana Ramdani			Recurring	
Anna Wilson-Jones	Holly Newman		Guest		
Neve Bonner	Lily Tao		Guest	Guest	
Serrana Su-Ling Bliss	Lily Tao				Recurring
Adain Bradley	John-Daniel Stern		Guest		Guest
Rick Warden	Robert Spearing Sr.		Guest		
James Nelson-Joyce	Jamie Henson		Recurring		
Naana Agyei-Ampadu	Sadie Sackey		Recurring		
Melissa Knatchbull	Mary Smith			Guest	Guest
Olivia Grant	Naomi Anderson			Guest	
Chloe Pirrie	Lisa Dearn			Guest	Recurring
Nico Rogner	Ferdinand Schwarzwald				Recurring
Jonjo O'Neill	Robin Williamson				Recurring
Skye Degruttola	Dolly Bird				Recurring
David Wilmot	Edward Burgess				Recurring
Sid Phoenix	Moritz-Hunter Bauer				Recurring
Martin Hancock	Dez Watkins				Recurring

== Pierpoint & Co. ==
=== Yasmin Kara-Hanani ===
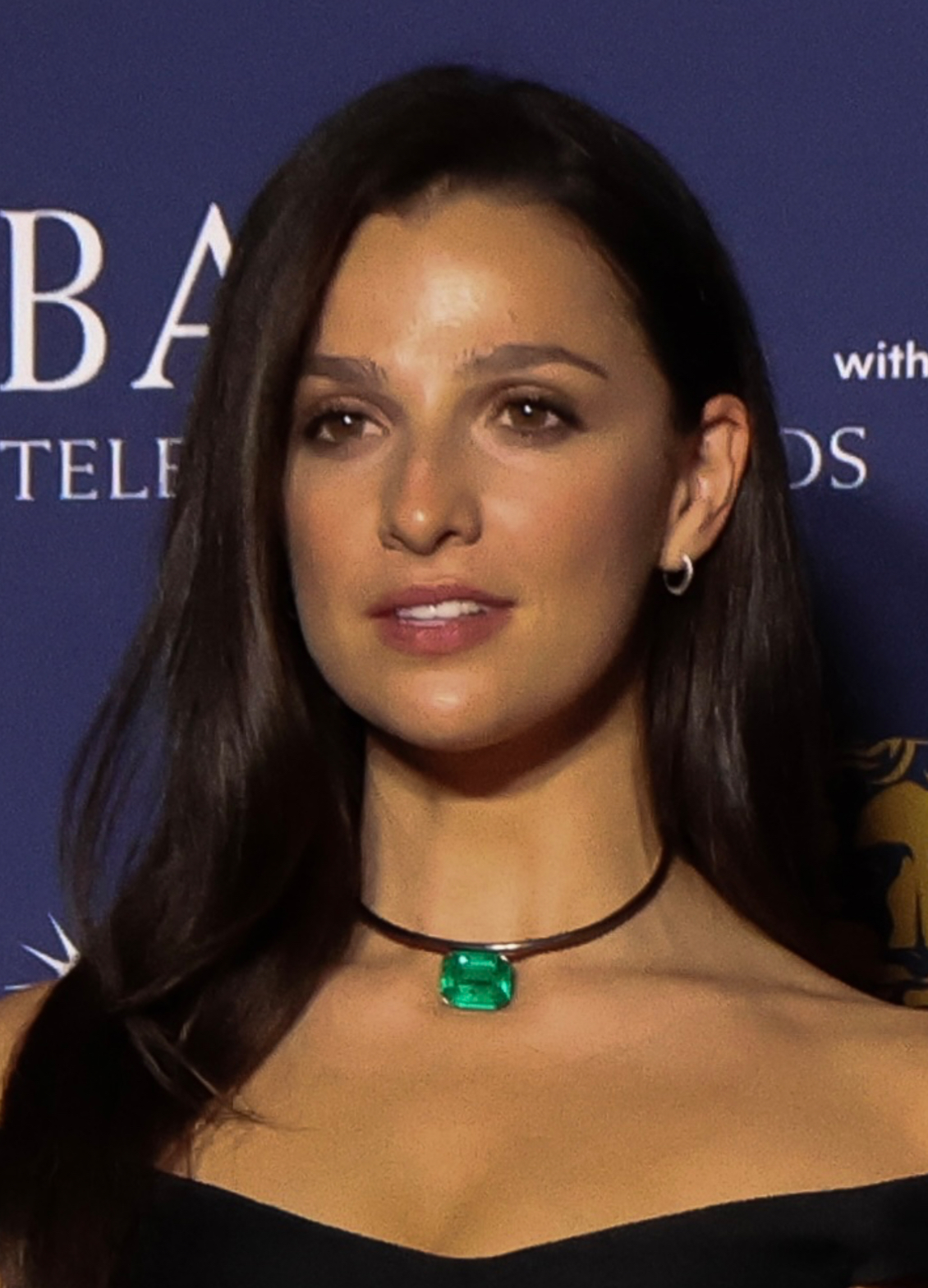
Marisa Abela

Yasmin Kara-Hanani (Marisa Abela) is a graduate recruit on Pierpoint’s Foreign Exchange (FX) Sales desk and one of the series’ protagonists. A wealthy heiress to the Hanani Publishing empire and fluent in multiple languages, she is materially privileged but emotionally unstable, with deeply strained relationships to her divorced parents—particularly her manipulative, philandering father Charles.

In series 1, Yasmin works under Vice President (VP) Kenny Kilbane, who repeatedly subjects her to bullying and verbal abuse. She lives alone in her father’s Notting Hill apartment, ends an unsatisfying relationship with her boyfriend Seb, and begins aggressively flirting with Robert Spearing, enjoying her emotional leverage over him despite his growing attachment. She befriends Harper Stern, who becomes her flatmate, though their friendship is complicated by Harper’s unreciprocated feelings for Robert and workplace rivalries. Despite Kenny’s conduct, Hilary Wyndham, Managing Director (MD) at the FX desk and Kenny's superior, advises Yasmin to remain silent during her Reduction in Force (RIF) day interview to appear a “team player.” Yasmin complies and is hired full-time, but Harper’s decision to reinstate Eric Tao and sacrifice Daria Greenock damages their friendship.

In series 2, Yasmin grows more competent and assertive on the desk while remaining hostile toward Harper. Kenny returns from rehab seeking absolution, which Yasmin refuses. She begins a sexual relationship with private wealth manager Celeste Pacquet and angles for a move into PWM. When Charles arrives in London as a prospective client, Yasmin uncovers that his finances are collapsing due to NDA settlements with former mistresses, including her childhood nanny. Yasmin confronts him over his predatory behavior, leading to Charles cutting her off financially.

In series 3, Yasmin confronts Charles aboard his yacht in Mallorca after catching him having sex with an employee; after a vicious argument, he jumps overboard and drowns while she makes no attempt to save him, with Harper helping cover up her involvement. Back in London, Yasmin is hounded by press amid revelations of Charles’ embezzlement and subsequent disappearance. Working on the merged CPS/FX desk, she helps rescue the spiraling Lumi IPO and begins a relationship with CEO Henry Muck, which she ends after learning of his harassment of employees. After rejecting Eric’s advances and being betrayed by Harper in a short against Pierpoint, Yasmin is fired following the leak of images of her father’s corpse. During a visit to Henry’s estate, Yasmin and Robert finally have sex and confess their love, but Yasmin ultimately agrees to marry Henry for protection and security. Months on, Yasmin’s public image has recovered, and she and Harper have reconciled.

In series 4, Yasmin reinvents herself as a socialite and political power broker as her marriage to Henry deteriorates following his loss of his parliamentary seat. She secures Henry the CEO role at fintech firm Tender and builds ties with Labour MP Jennifer Bevan to aid the company’s regulatory ambitions. In Vienna, she arranges a threesome with Henry and Tender assistant Hayley Clay, and after helping discredit journalist James Dycker, who is investigating Tender’s payment laundering, CFO Whitney Halberstram promotes her to chief communications officer; she promotes Hayley in turn, but learns Hayley holds leverage from their recorded encounter. Yasmin dismisses Harper’s warnings that Tender is fraudulent but later relays concerns to Henry. After Whitney gives Henry a letter acknowledging their criminal exposure, Yasmin works with Lord Norton to shift political blame toward the Labour government while allowing Henry to front the company’s collapse, then resigns and later divorces him following his arrest and plea deal. She reconciles with Harper and transitions into political public relations with Norton's backing, cultivating Reform MP Sebastian Stefanowicz and throwing him a Paris fundraiser backed by foreign donors using UK shell companies; when Harper objects to the event’s guests and Yasmin’s use of escorts, including Hayley and her cousin Dolly, Yasmin defends her actions as pragmatic and transactional, and shows Harper a compromising recording of Eric with Dolly. The next morning, she repeatedly listens to her father’s final voicemail inviting her on the yacht.

=== Sara Dhadwal ===
Sara Dhadwal (Priyanga Burford) is the president of Pierpoint London in series 1, and oversees its new hire program. Firm and principled, she initially clashes with Gus Sackey when he castigates her for promoting Pierpoint's cutthroat culture, which he blames for the death of his colleague Hari Dhar. However, Sara gradually becomes more in favor of culture change at the company; she views Eric as the primary embodiment of Pierpoint's toxicity, and fires him after Harper reports Eric locking her in a conference room to berate her. She also tries to become a more supportive figure to Gus, but he grows increasingly disillusioned with the firm, and purposely sabotages his interview on reduction-in-force (RIF) day. The same day, Pierpoint's global head of FICC, Bill Adler, offers Harper a chance to retract her complaint against Eric to bring him back to the firm; Sara takes her aside and tries talking her out of it, telling her she has the power to fundamentally change the culture of Pierpoint. Harper, however, rebuffs Sara for seeing her as a victim, and agrees to have Eric rehired.

=== Hilary Wyndham ===
Hilary Wyndham (Mark Dexter) is a MD of the FX desk at Pierpoint. Throughout the first season, he is shown to be a more measured leader than his subordinate Kenny, an alcoholic and a bully who repeatedly subjects Yasmin to verbal abuse. However, nearing reduction-in-force (RIF) day, Hilary advises Yasmin not to report Kenny's behavior, telling her that being a "team player" would benefit her career prospects. Yasmin caves to Hilary's advice during her RIF interview when she denies having any negative experiences at Pierpoint, and Hilary vouches for her, ensuring that she is hired.

In series 2, Hilary becomes paranoid about contracting COVID-19 at the office, wearing a mask to work and exhibiting germaphobe tendencies. Ironically, it is he who ends up falling ill and having to take time off from the office. Yasmin tells Hilary that she will be spending less time on the FX desk as she explores a move to the Private Wealth Management (PWM) division; Hilary, feeling numb and burnt out from the job, grants her his blessing.

Hilary briefly reappears in series 4, now working for the Railways Pension Scheme (RPS); Eric calls him to invest in his and Harper's new short-only fund, SternTao, but Hilary kindly declines, stating that the RPS doesn't share their appetite for risk.

=== Harper Stern ===
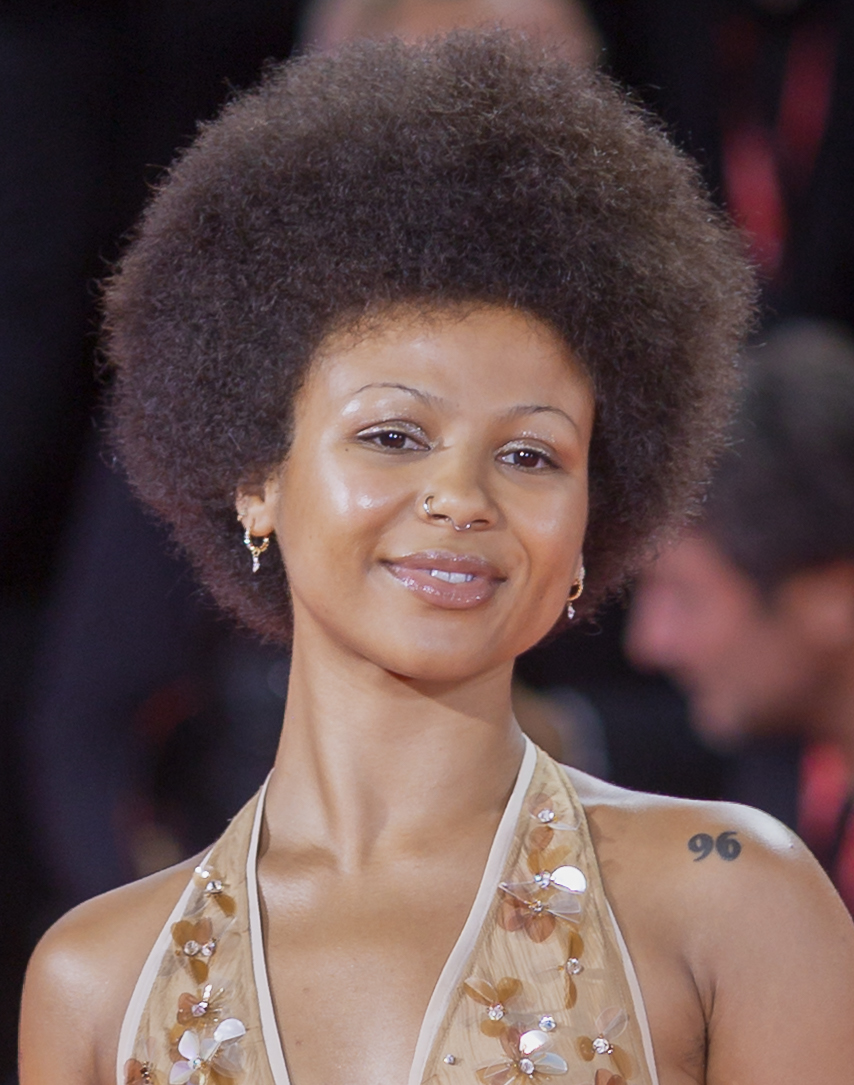
Myha'la

Harper Stern (Myha'la) is a new graduate on Pierpoint’s Cross-Product Sales (CPS) desk and one of the series’ protagonists. Brilliant, ruthless, and intensely ambitious, Harper routinely lies and manipulates to get ahead. Raised in Binghamton, New York by an abusive, domineering mother alongside her twin brother John-Daniel, she never graduated from college after suffering a panic attack during her final exams and conceals this to keep her job. She moves to London to escape her past and gravitates toward Eric Tao as a mentor who validates her drive.

In series 1, Harper forges college transcripts for HR, moves into Yasmin’s flat, and forms a close but fragile friendship with her. At work, she is torn between Daria, who insists on professionalism and limits, and Eric, whose aggression mirrors her own ambition; Eric admits he knows she never graduated but protects her. Harper’s early client experiences are damaging: hedge fund manager Nicole Craig sexually assaults her, and she fails to win back major client Felim Bichan, prompting Eric to trap and berate her in a conference room. Daria urges Harper to report Eric, leading to his firing. On RIF day, Harper retracts the complaint in exchange for Eric’s reinstatement and Daria’s dismissal, believing only Eric nurtures her potential. The decision isolates her and fractures her friendship with Yasmin.

In series 2, Harper remains estranged from Yasmin, and has had a casual sexual relationship with Robert. She befriends investor Jesse Bloom and secures him as a client by helping him seize control of healthcare startup Rican, undercutting Felim and contributing to Eric’s removal from the trading floor. Harper begins a relationship with new MD Daniel Van Deventer (DVD) and travels to Berlin to confront her estranged brother, who rebuffs her. When Pierpoint plans to fold London into New York, Harper engineers a survival bid with Eric to preserve a London office, getting DVD fired. After Jesse manipulates her into committing insider trading, Eric shields her by exposing her forged transcripts instead, getting her fired.

In series 3, six weeks prior to the main events, Harper accompanies Yasmin on a cruise in Mallorca and helps cover up Charles Hanani’s drowning. In the present, Harper works at ethical fund FutureDawn, where she earns Petra Koenig’s trust during the tumultuous Lumi IPO by helping hedge her exposure; the two co-found their own firm, LeviathanAlpha, with backing from Otto Mostyn. Harper enlists Pierpoint as their broker to humiliate Eric and illegally plans a short of Pierpoint’s ESG-backed debt, using an unwitting Yasmin to obtain information. The betrayal damages their friendship. Harper ultimately abandons the short but partners with Otto months later to launch a new hedge fund focused on shorting corrupt firms they can control. She and Yasmin also reconcile.

In series 4, Harper runs a short-only fund within Otto's asset management firm but grows frustrated with his tight oversight, later learning it is tied to his political interests. She cuts ties with Otto and brings Eric out of retirement to launch SternTao, targeting fintech company Tender. After a one-night stand with Tender CFO Whitney Halberstram, Harper is tipped off by journalist James Dycker that Tender is concealing misconduct. She hires Sweetpea and Kwabena Bannerman—her former colleague and casual partner—and sends them to Accra to investigate Tender’s acquisitions, where they uncover falsified profits and recycled revenue. Harper presents the findings at an investment conference, causing Tender’s stock to fall 28%. During this period, she learns her estranged mother has died and struggles to grieve amid her work. Eric later transfers his ownership stake in SternTao to her and withdraws from the partnership without explanation, having been blackmailed, leaving Harper devastated. She reconciles with Yasmin after helping circulate claims that the Labour government suppressed concerns about Tender, prompting investigations and a new audit. The Tender short ultimately earns SternTao £110 million, and Harper, Sweetpea, and Kwabena scout a new office. In Paris, Harper attends a fundraiser hosted by Yasmin for Reform MP Sebastian Stefanowicz and is disturbed by the guests (including the Nazi-sympathizing Bauer family) and Yasmin's use of escorts; Yasmin shows her a compromising recording of Eric with an underage prostitute, leaving Harper shaken. She later reflects on the Tender short in an interview with journalist Patrick Radden Keefe and ponders her future.

=== Gus Sackey ===
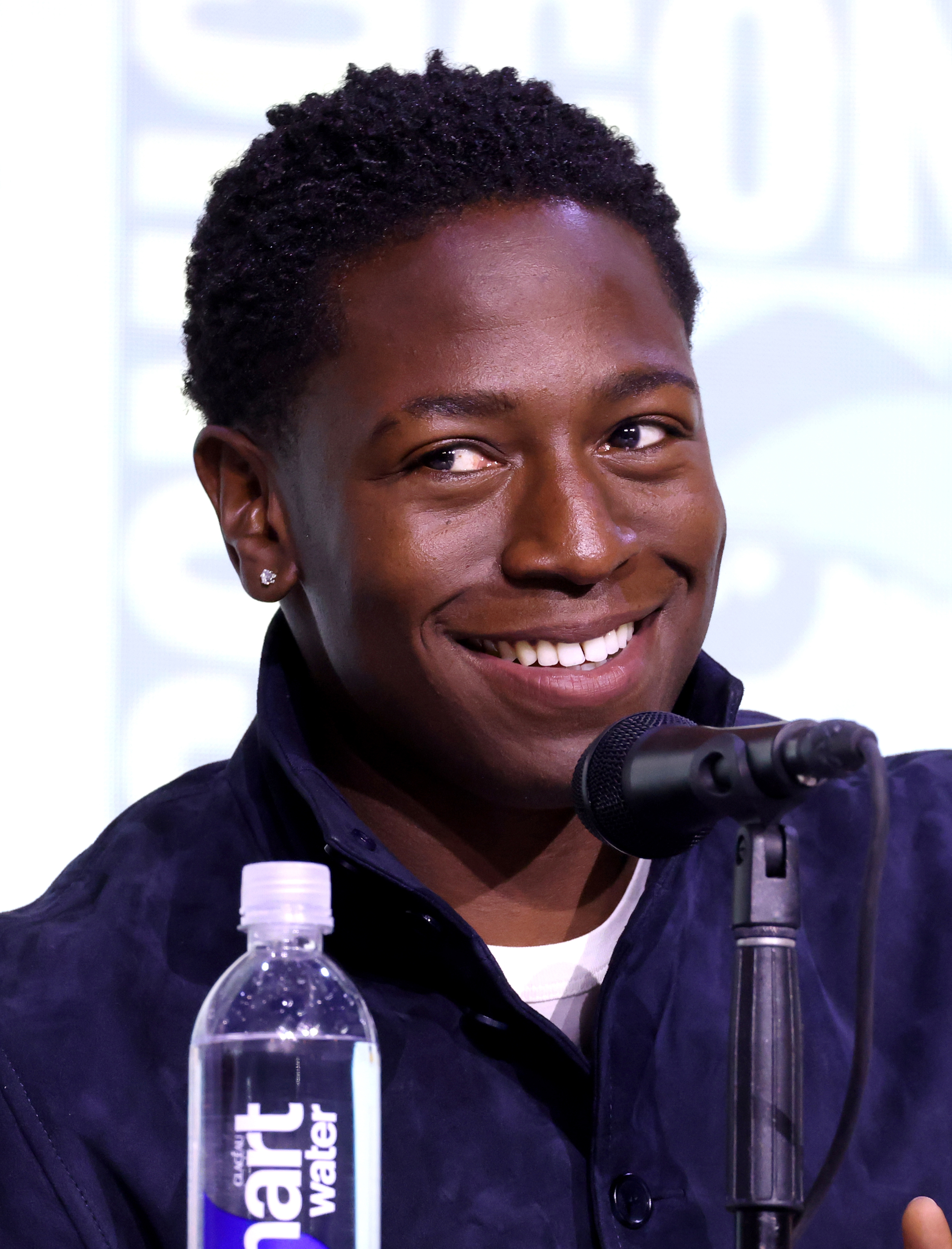
David Jonsson

Gus Sackey (David Jonsson) is a new grad at Pierpoint, and one of the series' protagonists during the first two series. He is initially assigned to the Investment Banking Division (IBD) and transferred to the CPS desk after the death of his colleague Hari Dhar. Gus is openly gay and hails from an elite background, having graduated literae humaniores from both Eton College and the University of Oxford. Despite his upper-class upbringing, Gus is shown to be humble and morally principled, and feels undervalued within Pierpoint's cutthroat work culture.

In series 1, Gus struggles to find a clear role after his team is dissolved and repeatedly alienates senior staff through his bluntness and frustration, including London office head Sara Dhadwal and his manager Clement Cowan. He also rekindles an affair with his former classmate Theo Tuck. On RIF day, Gus delivers a deliberately unserious presentation—beginning by reading from a note written as part of a bet—before walking out, and is not offered a permanent position.

In series 2, Gus re-emerges working in politics after striking up a connection with MP Aurore Adekunle, who hires him as an aide. Gus feels fulfilled by the work—which largely involves speaking with everyday constituents about their struggles—despite his sister Sadie's objections. While working for Aurore, Gus begins a relationship with Leo Bloom, the son of hedge fund manager Jesse Bloom, and later leaks confidential government information about the approval of Amazon’s acquisition of pharmaceutical company FastAide to Harper. The leak benefits both Jesse financially and Aurore politically, but Gus is fired by Aurore when he lets slip that he was responsible. Jesse subsequently hires Gus as his assistant.

In series 3, Rob mentions that Gus is working for a VC fund out of Palo Alto, California.

=== Robert Spearing ===
Robert Spearing (Harry Lawtey) is a new grad on Pierpoint's CPS desk, and one of the series' protagonists during series 1-3. Robert is an Oxford graduate born to a working-class family, and is determined to prove his worth at Pierpoint. Throughout the series, Robert is shown to be humble, personable, and good with clients, but frequently gets carried away indulging in alcohol and hard drugs. He also had a toxic relationship with his late mother, who was controlling and possessive, and is estranged from his father Robert Sr.

In series 1, Robert struggles to distinguish himself on a marginal desk under Clement Cowan, who has only one client and little interest in mentoring. He is drawn into a flirtatious triangle with Yasmin and Harper, enjoying Yasmin’s attention. Clement takes Robert to Amsterdam to meet their sole client, where the meeting succeeds and Clement gifts Robert a tailored suit, bonding with him over shared lower-class origins and revealing his own heroin addiction. Robert grows closer to Yasmin, parties heavily, and sleeps with Harper, culminating in an aborted threesome. On RIF day, Robert impresses Bill Adler with a presentation centered on client relationships and secures a full-time role.

In series 2, newly sober, Robert struggles with confidence and cold-calling but begins a sexual relationship with hedge fund manager Nicole Craig, who exerts control over him while masking her predatory behavior. He later intervenes—too late—when Nicole assaults Venetia, a grad he was recruiting with, and becomes complicit in Pierpoint’s decision to bury the incident. Robert’s mentor Clement dies and leaves him his apartment as inheritance. Robert also reconciles with his estranged father during a recruiting trip to Oxford.

In series 3, Robert has spent months working with Lumi founder Henry Muck as Pierpoint underwrites their IPO. He wakes up after a tryst with Nicole to find her dead beside him, leaving him shaken and guilt-ridden. Eric pushes him through the Lumi IPO. He later embarks on an ayahuasca trip with Henry which helps him come to terms with both his mother and Nicole's deaths, as well as giving him a renewed outlook on life. He grows closer to Yasmin and later brings her on a road trip tied to his efforts to raise venture capital for Little Labs, a psilocybin startup. Despite declaring mutual love with Yasmin, Robert accepts her decision to marry Henry for security and influence. Henry agrees to give Robert the money he needs to raise for Little Labs. By the series’ end, Robert thrives in California, confidently pitching Little Labs to venture capitalists.

=== Greg Grayson ===
Greg Grayson (Ben Lloyd-Hughes) is a VP on Pierpoint's CPS desk. He is initially romantically interested in Harper; she rejects his advances, but the two remain friends afterwards. Greg copes with Pierpoint's ruthless culture using drugs, and also explores writing in his spare time, which Eric publicly mocks him for. During an office Christmas party, Harper tells Robert to look after Greg and make sure he stays sober, but Robert and Greg end up indulging in heavy drug use with a client, culminating in Greg running headfirst into a window and injuring himself. Greg leaves Pierpoint after the incident.

In series 2 it is revealed that Greg has had a book published.

Greg briefly reappears at the end of series 3, now working as a venture capital investor in California. He listens to a sales pitch from Robert for Little Labs, a startup producing medicinal psilocybin.

=== Kenny Kilbane ===
Kenny Kilbane (Conor MacNeill) is a VP on Pierpoint's FX desk, and Yasmin's line manager. Throughout the first season, Kenny subjects Yasmin to repeated bullying and verbal abuse in the workplace, which he often blames on his alcoholism. In one case, Yasmin brings Kenny to a client dinner she arranged with her family friend Maxim Alonso, but Kenny embarrasses her when he orders a stripper to perform a lap dance on Yasmin in front of her disgusted clients. On RIF day, however, Kenny's boss Hilary Wyndham advises that Yasmin not report his behavior during her interview, suggesting that being a "team player" would help her career prospects.

In series 2, Kenny returns to work following a long stint in rehab during the COVID-19 pandemic, noticeably kinder to his colleagues and vocal about his commitment to self-improvement and repentance. Yasmin, though still uncomfortable around Kenny, invites him to another client dinner, which ends up going well after Kenny and the client bond over both attending AA. When Yasmin announces her departure from the FX desk for a role in private wealth management (PWM), Kenny takes her aside and offers a sincere, tearful apology for his past behavior. Later, however, new FX hire Venetia Berens reports to Kenny that CPS client Nicole Craig sexually assaulted her, and that Yasmin dismissed her concerns. Kenny confronts Yasmin about her response, but Yasmin berates him for his hypocrisy given his own history of abusive conduct towards her, and brands him a narcissist lording his sobriety over others.

In series 3, Kenny is said to have helped Eric through a drinking problem following Eric's marital separation. Kenny also reveals he recently got married himself. Eric admits to Yasmin that he regrets showing Kenny a vulnerable side of himself. Eric, recently promoted to partner, is told by Adler that he needs to fire someone on the trading floor to prove his worth. Instead of firing Yasmin or Robert like he initially considered, Eric fires Kenny, threatening to expose his past treatment of Yasmin if he does not go quietly. Kenny is later shown to have joined Goldman Sachs alongside fellow ex-Pierpoint employees Daria Greenock and Jackie Walsh, and the three agree to help Harper short Pierpoint.

In series 4, Kenny now works at Deutsche Bank, and Harper and Eric, now running their own hedge fund, enlist him to broker their short of payment processing startup Tender. Eric apologizes to Kenny for firing him. Kenny later tells Harper and Eric that they have breached their risk limits due to Tender's share price continuing to rise, forcing Deutsche to issue a margin call on their firm. Harper liquidates several of her firm's other positions to post more collateral, and sends Sweetpea and Kwabena to Accra in a last-ditch effort to uncover evidence against Tender. The Tender short is ultimately successful, and Harper calls Kenny to close the position after Tender's stock plummets, netting SternTao £110 million.

=== Daria Greenock ===
Daria Greenock (Freya Mavor) is a VP at Pierpoint's CPS desk, and Harper's line manager during her internship. Daria works to foster a poised, professional relationship with Harper, who nonetheless finds herself drawn more to Eric's fiery, cutthroat management style, frequently undercutting Daria in the process. When Harper confides to Daria that Eric locked her in a conference room to berate her for a mistake, Daria tells Sara and the two push Harper to file a formal complaint, getting Eric fired and positioning Daria to become CPS' managing director in his place. Harper is initially allowed to keep the outsize bonus that Eric paid her as long as she keeps it quiet, but Daria later has Harper pay it back after Harper talks about it during a party. On RIF day, Harper accepts a deal to retract her complaint against Eric and get him rehired, leading to Daria's firing.

In series 2, Daria is revealed to have joined Goldman Sachs; though she is on maternity leave, she visits the office during a sham interview with Harper, Eric, and Rishi to revel in their humiliation.

In series 3, however, Daria agrees to help Harper short Pierpoint alongside Kenny and Jackie, who have also joined Goldman Sachs, out of spite towards their ex-employer.

=== Clement Cowan ===
Clement Cowan (Derek Riddell) is a VP at Pierpoint's CPS desk, and Robert's manager during his internship. Clement covers only one account: Kaspar Zenden, a Dutch investor he has known for 20 years. Though initially distant and aloof, Clement forms a kinship with Robert over their shared working-class origins. He reveals to him that he is actually Scottish, but hides his background and accent to fit in with Pierpoint's elite. Robert also learns that Clement is heroin addict. Clement is eventually fired at the end of series 1 during a Pierpoint reorg. In series 2, Robert learns that Clement died and left him half a million pounds in his will, which Robert uses to buy himself a house in series 3.

=== Hari Dhar ===
Hari Dhar (Nabhaan Rizwan) is a new grad assigned to Pierpoint's IBD desk alongside Gus. Having come from a family of Indian immigrants and graduated from a state school, Hari feels out of place among Pierpoint's new grads, and overcompensates by working through the night at the office, sleeping in the bathrooms, skipping nights out with his colleagues, and abusing energy drinks and stimulant pills to stay awake. Within days, Hari dies of a heart attack in Pierpoint's bathroom stalls. Pierpoint does brief damage control before going back to business as usual. However, Hari's death causes many Pierpoint employees to reflect on the cutthroat culture of investment banking, and plays a role in Gus' eventual decision to leave the firm.

=== Theo Tuck ===
Theo Tuck (Will Tudor) is a second-year research analyst at Pierpoint. He and Gus were classmates at Eton College, where they were romantically involved till Gus moved to Oxford. The two rekindle their affair once Gus joins Pierpoint, but Theo remains closeted and lives with his girlfriend, Alice. During an office Christmas party, Alice catches Theo and Gus being intimate, and Theo breaks off his relationship with Gus shortly thereafter. Theo does not reappear after series 1, presumably having left Pierpoint.

=== Eric Tao ===
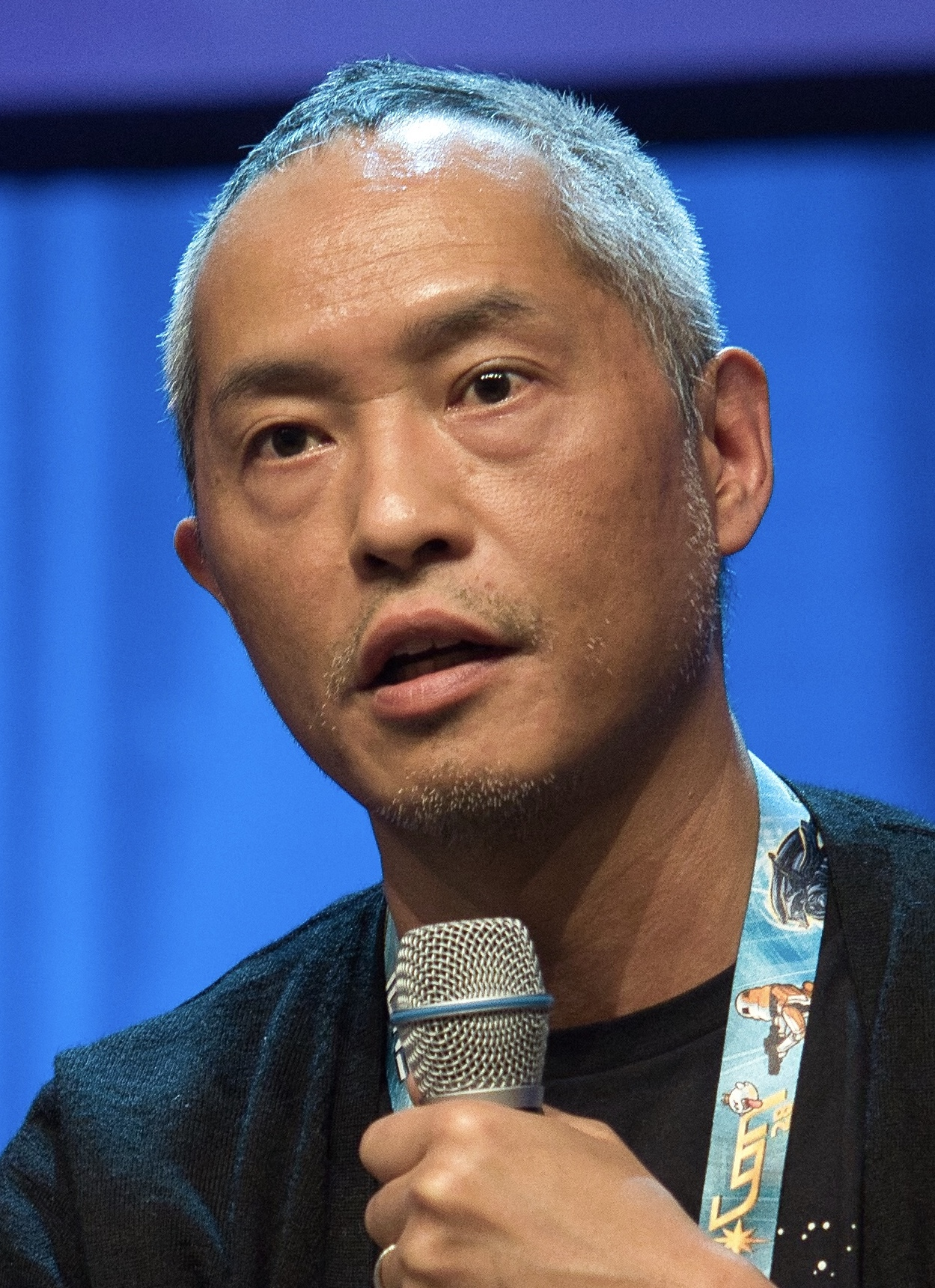
Ken Leung

Alvin America "Eric" Tao (Ken Leung) is a MD on Pierpoint’s CPS desk and one of the series’ protagonists. A longtime Pierpoint executive, Eric is brilliant, volatile, and ruthlessly pragmatic, frequently crossing ethical lines in pursuit of power. He takes Harper Stern on as a protégé, recognizing her ambition as a reflection of his own. Eric rose through the firm’s New York headquarters under the late MD Newman, remaining conflicted between admiration for Newman and the racism Newman directed at him. Eric is longtime friends with global head of FICC Bill Adler, whom he once hired and who later surpassed him in rank. He is married to Candice Allbright with two daughters, Lily and Lara.

In series 1, Eric salvages a disastrous trade Harper executes and admits he knows she never graduated from college but does not care. His relationship with key client Felim Bichan collapses after Eric makes offensive remarks in front of Felim’s wife. When Harper fails to recover the account, Eric traps and berates her in a conference room, prompting Daria Greenock to push Harper to report him, leading to Eric’s firing. On reduction-in-force day, Adler convinces Harper to retract her complaint to reinstate Eric, resulting in Daria’s dismissal.

In series 2, Eric briefly regains Felim as client, only to lose him permanently after Harper goes behind Eric's back to sell a controlling stake in healthcare startup Rican to Jesse Bloom, which Eric had promised to Felim. Adler confronts Eric over sustained underperformance, sidelines him from the trading floor, and relegates him to a marginal role. While in New York, Eric cheats on his wife with Newman’s widow Holly. When Pierpoint plans to merge its London and New York desks, Eric and Harper engineer a survival pitch that preserves London by sacrificing Rishi and DVD. After Harper becomes implicated in insider trading, Eric protects her by exposing her forged transcripts instead, getting her fired.

In series 3, Eric leads the merged CPS/FX desk. Separated from Candice and newly sober with Kenny’s help, he is promoted to partner but ordered by Adler to fire a senior colleague, leading him to impulsively fire Kenny. Eric uncovers that the debt Pierpoint issued to fund its pivot to ESG is nearing maturity amid failed IPOs and realizes the firm is close to collapse. Adler later reveals to Eric he is dying of a brain tumor. The night before the IPO, Eric does coke with Yasmin and her lawyer, asking Yasmin to leave so he can have sex with the lawyer. Learning that Harper is shorting Pierpoint using ESG data obtained from Yasmin, Eric fires Yasmin after images of her father’s drowned body leak. As Pierpoint’s debt crisis becomes public and its stock collapses, Eric ultimately exploits Adler's illness to sabotage him during acquisition talks and engineers Pierpoint’s sale to Egyptian sovereign wealth fund Al-Mi’raj via internal connections. Though the acquisition costs Eric his job due to the closure of the London trading floor, he leaves with a substantial severance, personally informing his team and calling Harper to wish her well.

In series 4, Eric is retired, wealthy but professionally adrift and estranged from his children, when Harper recruits him to co-found SternTao, a fund dedicated to shorting corrupt companies, with fintech firm Tender as their first major target. Eric liquidates his family office to finance the venture, and he and Harper clash over boundaries, with Harper accusing him of losing his edge and using the partnership to compensate for his failures as a father. Eric identifies Tender’s “satellite office” in Sunderland, prompting Harper’s investigation into the company’s laundering of African revenues. He later receives a secretly recorded video of himself with a prostitute named Dolly—planted by Tender—alongside a passport indicating she is 15 years old. Despite the blackmail, Eric appears on CNN opposite Whitney Halberstram to call for a new audit. He then abruptly dissolves SternTao and ends his partnership with Harper without explanation; Harper brands him a coward. The Tender short ultimately nets £110 million, but Eric does not answer when Harper calls to share the news. Yasmin later shows Harper the incriminating video, falsely claiming Dolly misrepresented her age and that Eric was attracted to the idea of sleeping with a teenager, further devastating Harper.

=== Rishi Ramdani ===
Rishi Ramdani (Sagar Radia) is an associate trader and market maker on Pierpoint’s CPS desk, known for his obscene humor, aggressive risk-taking, and constant background commentary on the trading floor. Initially a peripheral figure in series 1, he becomes central from series 2 onward.

In series 2, Rishi becomes openly hostile toward Harper, resenting her extended remote work after the COVID-19 pandemic. She earns back his respect by narrowly placing Rican shares with Jesse Bloom after Felim Bichan exits the deal, and later by secretly selling Anna Gearing’s stake to Jesse behind Eric’s back. Their alliance collapses when Harper manipulates Rishi into helping unload Jesse’s FastAide position against Pierpoint’s interests. Despite this, Rishi joins Harper, Eric, and DVD in a bid away from Pierpoint when Bill Adler plans to merge London and New York. Harper and Eric ultimately preserve London by offering Rishi and DVD up as expendable. On the day of Rishi’s wedding to Diana, he has cocaine-fueled sex with Harper, unaware of her impending betrayal. After Harper is fired for falsifying her college transcripts, Rishi keeps his job.

In series 3, Rishi and Diana have a baby and move to the countryside, where Rishi clashes with her wealthy, white family. He repeatedly cheats, including with Sweetpea Golightly, bullies junior trader Anraj Chabra, and hides a severe gambling addiction, owing over £200,000 to loan shark and former friend Vinay. He also places a massive £300 million long position on pound sterling, gambling that a rumored UK tax cut will raise the value of the pound. When the tax cut is realised, it has the opposite effect, putting Rishi at risk of booking millions in losses. After a disastrous casino binge, Diana agrees to cover his debts—only for Rishi’s long position to suddenly net £18 million when the tax cut is reversed alongside a significant increase in the pound interest rate. this success, however, prompts him to immediately take out another gambling loan. When Pierpoint’s stock collapses on its 150th anniversary, Rishi correctly deduces an acquisition after spotting the Barclays CEO enter the building. He interviews with Harper for a hedge fund role, only find that the job offer is a sham designed to humiliate him in front of Sweetpea and Anraj, who she has hired. On Rishi's birthday, Vinay tells Diana about Rishi’s debts and murders her in front of him, leaving Rishi traumatized.

In series 4, Rishi is without a job, as he is unable to clear even basic background checks due to his wife's murder, and is revealed to have attempted suicide while living in a motel and abusing prescription drugs. Harper, who paid for his stay in rehab, gives him cash payments to surreptitiously obtain information that would aid her in shorting companies. Harper later cuts ties with Rishi after hiring Sweetpea, who is repulsed by him and refuses to work with Harper if he is involved. Rishi subsequently meets with his mother-in-law, Mary, who has custody of his son, Hugo, and agrees to change Hugo's surname to Smith in exchange for continued visitation. Rishi later meets financial journalist Jim Dycker in a bar, telling him that Vinay's charges were reduced to manslaughter after an insanity plea. He and Jim go to Rishi's apartment along with Dez Watkins, a man they met at the bar (who, unbeknownst to them, is a fixer for the Russian government), and do cocaine together. Watkins raises the volume on Rishi's stereo before leaving, inciting a noise complaint that draws police to the apartment right as Jim overdoses and dies from poisoned drugs given to them by Watkins. Rishi attempts to escape by jumping off the balcony, but breaks both ankles in the fall and gets arrested, and later charged with manslaughter.

=== Jackie Walsh ===
Jackie Walsh (Caoilfhionn Dunne) is a VP on Pierpoint's FX desk, working alongside Kenny. She is shown to have a kind nature despite her crass sense of humor and seemingly blasé attitude about Pierpoint's work culture. Throughout the first season, she appears to play along with Kenny's workplace bullying, but chastises Yasmin for emulating it in series 2 during Kenny's absence, telling her she is above such behavior. Jackie joins Yasmin and Harper on a trip to Berlin to take over for Yasmin as Anna Gearing's FX contact, after Yasmin announces her departure from FX to private wealth management. Anna takes an immediate liking to Jackie for her acerbic wit.

In series 3, Jackie is shown to have left Pierpoint for Goldman Sachs, joining Daria and Kenny in helping Harper short Pierpoint.

=== Bill Adler ===
Bill Adler (Trevor White) is the global head of FICC (Fixed Income, Currencies and Commodities) at Pierpoint, and is based out of the New York headquarters. Adler is a ruthless pragmatist fiercely devoted to the firm; he is also a longtime friend of Eric, who initially hired him, but as his senior, he is shown to feel entitled to Eric's loyalty and support.

Adler first appears in the series 1 finale to vet new grads on the RIF day. He makes Harper a deal to reinstate Eric after she got him fired for his verbal abuse in the workplace.

In series 2, Eric visits Adler in New York following the loss of Felim Bichan as a client and confronts him over reduced compensation for his team and the rumored consolidation of the London and New York desks. Adler rebuffs Eric, citing his underperformance, and sidelines him in a non-trading role. DVD later goes to Adler to report client Nicole Craig's sexual assault of new hire Venetia Berens, but Adler tells him to bury the case. When Harper and Eric go to Adler proposing a leaner London office and threaten to publicize Pierpoint's culture of suppression, Adler accepts their terms, consolidating CPS and FX and allowing DVD to be dismissed.

In series 3, Adler supports Eric’s promotion to partner but orders him to fire a trader to demonstrate authority, leading Eric to dismiss Kenny Kilbane. Adler intervenes directly on the trading floor during the Lumi IPO to reassure investors. Afterwards, Adler takes extended time away from work, eventually revealing to Eric that he has a malignant brain tumor, and may not live longer than a year. As Pierpoint faces a debt crisis stemming from its ESG pivot, Adler clashes with senior leadership, particularly CFO Wilhelmina Fassbinder, over a potential sale of the firm, and brokers a meeting with Mitsubishi executives. Eric, realizing he needs to break free from Adler's influence, exploits Adler's illness during the meeting by gaslighting him into believing he overlooked a major error in the deal sheet. Adler has a breakdown and reveals his prognosis to the room; Eric escorts him out, and Adler realizes Eric betrayed him. Six months later, Adler has died, with Pierpoint organizing his memorial.

=== Venetia Berens ===
Venetia Berens (Indy Lewis) is a new grad who joins Pierpoint's FX desk in the second series. She is first seen in series 1 at a Pierpoint recruiting event, pressing Robert and Yasmin on the firm's toxic culture. Ambitious and idealistic, Venetia is determined to prove herself within Pierpoint's cutthroat work environment, provoking resentment from Yasmin over not having to face the same mistreatment she suffered in her first year. In series 2, While scouting new recruits, Venetia grows closer to Robert, to whom she is attracted, but Robert humiliates her when he makes an aggressive pitch to a student while on cocaine, wherein he suggests that Venetia is merely using achievement to seek external validation. Venetia later barges into a client dinner between Robert and Nicole Craig, unaware that they are in a sexual relationship; after Robert leaves the two alone, Nicole sexually assaults Venetia. Venetia confides this to Yasmin, but she dismisses her concerns. Venetia then goes to Kenny, who attempts to report the assault up the chain of command, but to no avail.

In series 3, Venetia and Robert have begun dating. Venetia, growing increasingly tired of Pierpoint's abusive work environment, eventually quits the firm. While leaving, she reveals to Rishi that she was the one who anonymously posted to a Reddit page called "Overheard At Pierpoint", which contained many of Rishi's lewd and inappropriate comments on the trading floor.

=== Daniel Van Deventer ===
Daniel Van Deventer (Alex Akpobome), nicknamed “DVD,” is a Pierpoint trader transferred from New York to London during plans to consolidate the two offices. A former protégé of Eric Tao, DVD’s rapid rise places him in direct competition with Eric, ultimately contributing to Eric’s demotion after the loss of Felim Bichan as a client. DVD assumes Eric’s responsibilities as CPS MD and begins a sexual relationship with Harper, encouraging her to consider relocating to New York as the London office faces closure. He later suspends Harper after secretly listening in on a call in which she helps Jesse Bloom unload positions at Pierpoint’s expense. DVD grows disillusioned with Pierpoint after being instructed by Adler to ignore Nicole Craig’s sexual assault of Venetia Berens, and sympathizes with Harper upon learning she was also assaulted by Nicole. He agrees to leave the firm with Harper, Eric, and Rishi, but is ultimately betrayed when Harper and Eric strike a deal with Adler to preserve a reduced London operation by branding DVD and Rishi as disloyal. DVD is fired along with much of the London office, discovering his dismissal only when his security badge stops working.

=== Celeste Pacquet ===
Celeste Pacquet (Katrine De Candole) is a private wealth manager at Pierpoint. Yasmin meets her at a party hosted by her family friend Maxim Alonso, and Celeste plays along with Yasmin's assumption that she is a sex worker before eventually revealing her actual job. Yasmin, growing disgruntled with the FX desk, becomes increasingly drawn to working for PWM, in part due to her escalating flirtation with Celeste. Yasmin and Celeste eventually have sex, but Celeste reveals she is already in an open marriage with her wife and resents the power imbalance in their relationship, making Yasmin realize their affair is not as significant as she imagined. Yasmin brings in her father, Charles Hanani, as a PWM client, but soon regrets it after learning about his various affairs and subsequent NDA settlements, realizing he is a sexual predator. Celeste refuses to cut ties with Charles despite knowing about his inappropriate behavior firsthand, telling Yasmin that it is "better to work within a system and succeed than to wish for it to change and be left behind." A disillusioned Yasmin cuts ties with Celeste shortly thereafter.

=== Anraj Chabra ===
Anraj Chabra (Irfan Shamji) is a mild-mannered junior trader at Pierpoint working under Rishi, who frequently takes his anger out on him. Rishi uses Anraj's account to run a £300 million long on pound sterling against the US dollar, raising major flags at Pierpoint's risk management division (and jeopardizing Anraj's job and FCA license) until Rishi miraculously nets £18 million from the investment due to a last-minute tax cut by the UK government. Rishi also steals some of Anraj's money (claiming he is using it to bet on horse races) to gamble away at a casino. Anraj later admits that he is afraid to come to work because of Rishi's volatile behavior. Anraj and Sweetpea become friends over the course of their time at Pierpoint, in part due to their mutual frustration with Rishi. Anraj is briefly seen in series 4 attending the ALPHA conference, where Harper publicizes her findings on the fraudulent profits of fintech company Tender; he and Eric exchange a friendly glance.

=== Sweetpea Golightly ===
Sweetpea Golightly (Miriam Petche) is a new Pierpoint hire with TikTok and OnlyFans businesses on the side. She is revealed to have had an affair with Rishi, who subscribes to her OnlyFans page. Sweetpea is shown to be a shrewd and competent trader despite her seemingly carefree and social media-obsessed personality. She eventually discovers that a hefty debt Pierpoint issued five years ago to fund their pivot to ESG is reaching maturity, but cannot be paid off since the firm's ESG investments are not making any returns. She reports this to Eric, who tells her to keep it quiet; Harper later overhears Sweetpea telling Yasmin in the bathroom, and uses this information to plan a short of Pierpoint. After Pierpoint is sold to Al-Mi'raj Holdings, Sweetpea leaves the firm to go work for Harper.

In series 4, Sweetpea works under Harper at Mostyn Asset Management, but is opposed to Harper's impulsive trading strategy. Sweetpea's explicit photos have leaked online, hurting her job prospects and straining her relationship with her mother. After Harper exits Mostyn's firm and starts her own fund with Eric called SternTao, she brings an apprehensive Sweetpea on board, and the two investigate the shady dealings of payment processing startup Tender, which Harper seeks to short. Sweetpea's investigation leads her on a trip to Accra alongside SternTao trader Kwabena Bannerman to uncover the truth behind Tender's business. Sweetpea is assaulted during the trip by a man possibly sent by Tender, and she and Kwabena have sex. The two discover that Tender has been running a round-tripping scheme, falsifying profits by overstating the costs of its acquisitions of third-party payment processors in Ghana and bribing officials to help stage publicity photos. Her findings enable Harper to make a public case against Tender at an investor conference, causing its stock to fall 28%. The Tender short is ultimately successful, netting the fund £110 million, with Sweetpea, Harper and Kwabena distributing £2 million amongst themselves. The three later explore an office for their fund.

=== Wilhelmina Fassbinder ===
Wilhelmina Fassbinder (Georgina Rich) is the ambitious new CFO of Pierpoint, and an early champion of the firm's pivot to ESG. She is frequently at odds with Adler, whose influence she warns Eric not to succumb to. Wilhelmina helps new Pierpoint CEO Tom Wolsey salvage the company's future amid a debt crisis, advocating for an ultimately unsuccessful acquisition by Barclays. After Eric brokers a sale to Al-Mi'raj, a holding company of the Egyptian sovereign wealth fund, at Adler's expense, Wilhelmina retains her title while both Eric and Tom lose their jobs.

In series 4, Wilhelmina is now CEO of Al-Mi'raj Pierpoint. The firm has invested in payment processor Tender, which is using Pierpoint's wealth management division as a use case for their new banking app. Wilhelmina agrees to invest a further $1 billion in Tender in the form of a contingent convertible bond after negotiations with CFO Whitney Halberstram. After Tender's stock plummets following rumors of fraud and calls for a new audit, Whitney makes a bid for a hostile takeover of Pierpoint in hopes of complicating regulatory scrutiny, and uses his knowledge that Al-Mi'raj is divesting their ownership of Pierpoint to strong-arm Wilhelmina into allowing him to make an offer at Pierpoint's annual general meeting in New York. However, Wilhelmina later calls Henry and reveals that Whitney never bought a stake in Pierpoint as he previously claimed to Henry, and that she merely used his takeover offer as leverage to sell Pierpoint to Temasek Holdings for a higher price. She also asserts that Pierpoint will seek full recovery of their investment in Tender if its stock continues to crater.

=== Ali El Mansour ===
Ali El Mansour (Fady Elsayed) is a new trader Adler hired due to his family ties to the Egyptian sovereign wealth fund. To rescue Pierpoint from a fatal debt crisis, Eric reaches out to Ali to have him bring in his family as the firm's buyers. Pierpoint is thereby absorbed into Al-Mi'raj, a holding company for the Egyptian sovereign wealth, who decide to consolidate the firm's trading to the New York headquarters and thereby shut down the London office.

=== Frank Wade ===
Frank Wade (Joel Kim Booster) is a research analyst at Pierpoint covering the energy sector. After the tumultuous IPO of green-energy startup Lumi, Wade publishes a research report with a "hold" recommendation on Lumi stock, which is tantamount to a "sell" given that Pierpoint underwrote the IPO.

=== Tom Wolsey ===
Tom Wolsey (Harry Hadden-Paton) is the newly-appointed CEO of Pierpoint, brought on to help steer the firm through its debt crisis. Tom assembles an emergency committee of senior executives to help salvage Pierpoint when its stock plummets the day of its 150th anniversary. After several failed attempts to find a buyer for the firm, Eric finally brokers a sale with Al-Mi'raj, a firm representing the Egyptian sovereign wealth fund. Tom is fired as CEO because the Egyptian government would not approve of his homosexuality.

== Other main cast members ==
=== Nicole Craig ===
Nicole Craig (Sarah Parish) is the CEO of investment fund Mallon Mercer, and a major Pierpoint client. Despite being an outspoken feminist in public, she repeatedly engages in predatory sexual behavior toward junior bankers. In series 1, Nicole makes a drunken sexual advance on graduate Harper Stern following a client dinner. Harper initially maintains the relationship to protect her job but later deliberately antagonizes Nicole into severing ties with Pierpoint.

In series 2, Robert, looking to make more outgoing calls, wins Nicole back as a Pierpoint client by being endearingly honest about feeling out of his depth at the job. The two connect over dinner, and Nicole masturbates him in the car on the way home. The two continue an illicit sexual relationship for months onward, with Robert projecting many of his unresolved issues with his late mother onto the domineering Nicole. Robert later learns from Harper that Nicole made an advance on her the previous year. Nicole later sexually assaults new hire Venetia Berens, who Robert left alone with Nicole during a client dinner that went sideways. Venetia’s attempt to report the incident is suppressed by Pierpoint management. Robert tries to cut ties with Nicole afterwards, but she reestablishes her control over him after bailing him out when he is arrested for cocaine possession.

In series 3, Robert and Nicole are still involved; Robert spends a night with her, only to suddenly find her dead the next morning. He later returns to her house to retrieve a necklace Venetia gave him, and discovers that she has an estranged 15-year-old daughter who is well aware of her numerous affairs. Nicole's exact cause of death is not specified, but is said to be of natural causes.

=== Felim Bichan ===
Felim Bichan (Andrew Buchan) is a Scottish hedge fund manager and initially Pierpoint's biggest client with a decades-long client relationship with Eric. A firm, principled man who ascended from humble beginnings, Felim initially cuts ties with Eric and Pierpoint after Eric drunkenly makes offensive comments in front of Felim's wife. On Eric's orders, Harper attempts to coax Felim back to the firm, but Felim gently warns Harper not to fall prey to Eric's malign influence.

In series 2, Felim returns as Pierpoint's client so long as Harper act the intermediary between him and Eric. Harper, however, blows off a client meeting with Eric and Felim to meet with notorious independent investor Jesse Bloom, who she is courting as a client. Felim is initially the anchor on a $3.3 billion block trade for shares of healthcare startup Rican, with Eric promising him pre-buy stock options. Felim, however, pulls out of the trade after Harper misses the client meeting, as it reaffirms his distrust of Eric, and Harper sells the shares to Bloom at the last minute instead.

Felim, Jesse, Harper and Eric attend a duck shoot in Wales for Rican investors, which Pierpoint initially organized to celebrate Felim's planned purchase of Rican stock. Felim and Jesse remain at odds since Felim rejects his modest beginnings while Jesse embraces his, and Felim chastises Harper for gravitating towards bullies. Jesse later injures Felim's face with shrapnel while trying to shoot a rare pheasant. Eric plans to have Jesse to sell his shares to Felim at the shoot, but Harper instead covertly helps Jesse buy a controlling stake in Rican from FutureDawn Partners, a socially conscious investment fund, seeing as Rican is underperforming and hiding it from Felim to ensure his investment. Felim, realizing Eric has yet again failed to deliver on his promises, cuts ties with him for good.

=== Usman Abboud ===
Usman Abboud (Amir El-Masry) is the assistant to Kaspar Zenden, Clement's sole client. Usman puts on a professional facade for Kaspar, pretending to be conservative and abstinent from alcohol and drugs, but reveals himself as a hard-partying, homosexual playboy to Robert and later Greg. After Clement is fired from Pierpoint, Usman tells Robert that Kaspar no longer wishes to continue his relationship with Pierpoint.

=== Maxim Alonso ===
Maxim Alonso (Nicholas Bishop) is a hedge fund manager and old family friend of Yasmin's, placed in charge of overseeing her father Charles' assets. Maxim has a tense, quasi-brotherly relationship with Yasmin throughout series 1, especially after a client meeting with him is derailed by the misbehavior of Yasmin's abusive boss Kenny. In series 2, Maxim's fund goes bankrupt, prompting him to throw an excessive, drug-fueled party where and Yasmin end up having sex. While initially continuing their tryst, Yasmin grows distant from Maxim after becoming privy to Charles' numerous extramarital affairs and subsequent NDA settlements, which she is angry at Maxim for not telling her about. Maxim later drunkenly tries to force himself on Yasmin in bed, causing her to cut ties with him.

In series 3, Maxim reaches out to Yasmin while camping in Northern California to tell her that Hanani Publishing was complicit in Charles' sexual misconduct, providing several of his victims with sham jobs in exchange for their silence. He explains that the company wants to make Yasmin the face of the scandal to hide their own involvement.

=== Jesse Bloom ===
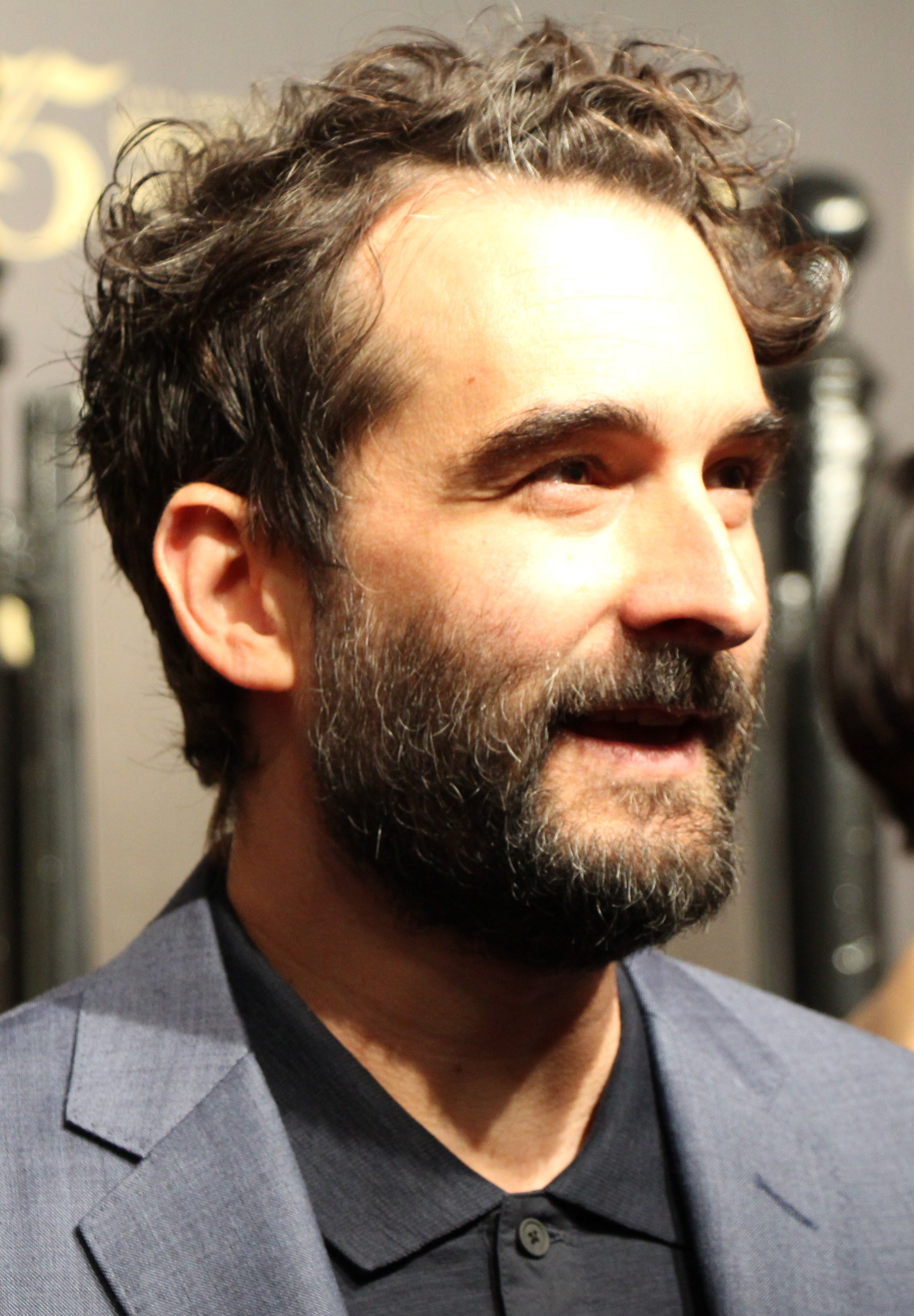
Jay Duplass

Jesse Bloom (Jay Duplass) is an independent billionaire investor who profited heavily from the COVID-19 pandemic. He owns the hedge fund Crotona Capital and becomes a mentor and tenuous ally to Harper, who admires his maverick investment philosophy.

In series 2, Harper meets Jesse while living in a hotel and working remotely, and begins courting him as a Pierpoint client. Jesse first becomes central to Pierpoint’s business through a $3.3 billion block trade in healthcare startup Rican: when anchor investor Felim Bichan withdraws after Harper misses a client meeting, Harper sells the shares to Jesse at the last moment. Acting on Harper’s advice and against Eric’s instructions, Jesse later buys out FutureDawn Partners’ stake in Rican, securing a controlling interest that Eric had promised to Felim. Jesse employs Gus Sackey to tutor his estranged son Leo, and Gus and Leo begin a relationship. Later, on Harper’s recommendation, Jesse enters a short position in brick-and-mortar pharmacy chain FastAide, routed through another bank rather than Pierpoint; when the trade turns against him, he visits Pierpoint to confront Harper, and later abandons a scheduled public speaking appearance after receiving a call from Leo. When Gus leaks to Harper that the government is allowing Amazon to acquire FastAide, Harper alerts Jesse. Jesse then goes on television to publicly criticize the acquisition, reviving regulatory scrutiny and protecting his short position. Gus is fired for the leak but later hired by Jesse as an assistant. Meanwhile, Eric preemptively gets Harper fired from Pierpoint for forging her college transcripts, thereby protecting her from insider trading charges tied to her helping Jesse.

Jesse does not appear in series 3, but is mentioned to be serving a 24-month prison sentence for tax evasion. At the end of series 3, Harper reads a news story reporting that Jesse has been released.

=== Charles Hanani ===
Charles Hanani (Adam Levy) is Yasmin's father, and the wealthy CEO of the Hanani Publishing company. Charles is a serial philanderer, long divorced from Yasmin's mother Azar. He has a strained relationship with Yasmin, whom he treats like a child, and who carries trauma from growing up around her father's sexually inappropriate behavior.

Charles reenters Yasmin’s life in series 2 when he arrives in London on business. Hoping to transition into Pierpoint’s private wealth management division, Yasmin brings him on as a client, only to learn that much of his fortune has been drained by nondisclosure settlements with women he had affairs with—including her former nanny, leading Yasmin to realize he likely groomed her. When confronted, Charles attacks Yasmin for condemning him while benefiting from his wealth and cuts her off financially.

In series 3, Yasmin joins Charles on his yacht in Mallorca and catches him performing oral sex on a pregnant employee. Amid revelations that he is being sued by his own company for historic embezzlement, the two engage in a vicious confrontation in which Yasmin accuses him of sexualizing her throughout her life. A drunken Charles jumps overboard after Yasmin wishes him dead, and she makes no attempt to save him; Harper helps cover up her involvement. After Charles’ body is recovered, Hanani Publishing scapegoats Yasmin to deflect from its own complicity in silencing his victims, prompting her to sue the company. Lord Norton, a former Oxford classmate of Charles’, tells Yasmin he always knew Charles to be a sexual predator going back to his Oxford days. Later, Yasmin hires Alondra—the woman from the yacht—who implies Charles abused girls as young as twelve and gently suggests Yasmin may have been a victim as well, causing Yasmin to break down.

At the end of series 4, Yasmin, who has herself become a predatory figure by trafficking escorts to powerful men, repeatedly listens to Charles' final voicemail inviting her on the boat trip.

=== Leo Bloom ===
Leo Bloom (Sonny Poon Tip) is Jesse's wayward, estranged 19-year-old son. Jesse hires Gus to tutor Leo on his college admissions essays to Oxford and Cambridge despite Leo's disinterest in school, and Leo and Gus soon begin a sexual relationship. Over time, Gus helps Leo discover his academic ambitions, and Leo is grateful for the experience despite not being admitted to either of his choice schools. Gus later utilizes his connections at Oxford to land Leo an admission, and Jesse hires Gus as his assistant in return after Gus loses his government job.

=== Anna Gearing ===
Anna Gearing (Elena Saurel) is the head of FutureDawn Partners, a socially conscious investment fund. Despite her ethical business philosophy, Anna is shown to have expensive personal tastes, and micromanages employees at her fund. She has two daughters, with her longtime portfolio manager Petra Koenig as their godmother.

Anna first appears as a client of Pierpoint, with Yasmin Kara-Hanani hedging her FX exposure. Harper meets Anna at a Pierpoint-organized duck shoot in Wales tied to healthcare startup Rican, where Anna bluntly assesses Rican as fundamentally underperforming and incapable of delivering on its social mission. Harper uses this insight to convince Jesse Bloom to buy out Anna’s stake—after already selling him $3.3 billion in shares—securing his controlling interest and long-term profit. After Harper is fired from Pierpoint, she joins FutureDawn as Anna’s executive assistant, but quickly aligns herself with Petra, who grows disillusioned with Anna’s leadership. Tensions peak when Harper helps Petra hedge Lumi IPO exposure by buying credit default swaps on fossil-fuel assets, directly contradicting FutureDawn’s ethical stance. Harper and Petra ultimately break away to form their own hedge fund, publicly announcing the move at a Swiss climate conference attended by Anna.

=== Aurore Adekunle ===
Aurore Adekunle (Faith Alabi) is a Tory MP. She is introduced in series 2 as an ally of Anna Gearing, joining her on a duck shoot in Wales hosted by Pierpoint for investors in healthcare startup Rican. Gus strikes up a friendship with Aurore at the shoot, and she hires him to work at her government office to help handle her mounting meetings with constituents. Gus later leaks to Harper that the government is allowing Amazon to acquire drugstore chain FastAide, jeopardizing Jesse's planned short of the company; Harper tells Jesse, who criticizes the acquisition on live TV, thereby reviving the government inquiry—boosting Aurore's reputation—while saving his own short. Aurore, however, is forced to fire Gus after he lets slip that he was the source of the leak, even though the information ended up helping her.

Aurore reappears in series 3, having been promoted to Energy Secretary; she publicly champions Henry Muck's green-energy startup Lumi, while privately scheming with Henry's uncle Lord Norton and godfather Otto Mostyn to elevate her own position in government. Aurore publicly takes responsibility for Lumi's collapse during a government inquest, thereby positioning her for a future bid for Prime Minister. She and Norton later capitalize on the news of Barclays' failed acquisition of Pierpoint, framing it in the news as an antitrust win for Aurore.

Aurore does not appear in series 4, with Lord Norton describing her as "hated" by the Conservative Party and was targeted by the 1922 Committee.

=== Henry Muck ===
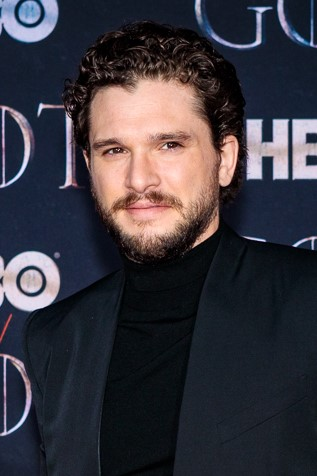
Kit Harington

Sir Henry Muck (Kit Harington), born Henry de Chartley Norton, is a wealthy aristocrat and entrepreneur, introduced as the CEO of Lumi, a green energy startup. He has a history of clinical depression following his father's suicide, and is an erratic, mercurial business leader.

In series 3, Lumi prepares for a high-profile IPO underwritten by Pierpoint, with Robert having worked closely with Henry in the months leading up to the listing. On the day of the IPO, Henry behaves recklessly: he returns a major investor’s shares after being confronted over inflated earnings, takes psychedelics, and speaks to the press against advice, culminating in a physical confrontation with Robert. The listing is salvaged only after Yasmin orchestrates publicity around a meeting between Henry, his godfather Otto Mostyn, and a power-company investor, producing a last-minute boost to Lumi’s stock. In gratitude—and amid his sexual interest in Yasmin—Henry has his uncle Lord Norton suppress negative press related to her father’s disappearance. As Lumi collapses and becomes subject to a government inquest, Henry admits to Yasmin that the company largely existed to stave off his depression. Their relationship ends after sexual harassment complaints against Henry surface and he dismisses Yasmin’s concerns. After Yasmin is fired from Pierpoint and faces continued scrutiny over her father's legal scandals and death, Henry’s family reaches out to propose marriage as a means of protection and stability; she ultimately accepts, and her public image is rehabilitated through their union.

In series 4, Henry enters politics as a Conservative MP but loses his seat to Jennifer Bevan in a Labour landslide, after which he falls into severe depression that strains his marriage to Yasmin. On his 40th birthday—mirroring the age at which his father committed suicide—he nearly takes his own life but stops himself and accepts an offer from Whitney Halberstram to become CEO of fintech startup Tender. His early tenure includes overseeing Tender’s merger with Austrian bank IBN Bauer and the launch of its banking app. While in Austria, Yasmin arranges a threesome involving Henry and assistant Hayley Clay, which Hayley later reveals was secretly recorded. Henry grows closer to Whitney, who develops a sexual fixation on him and takes him on a bender at a gay club, threatening his sobriety. After Harper exposes Tender’s fraudulent practices, the company’s stock drops 28%. Henry fires the firm’s auditor and confronts Whitney, who gives him a handwritten letter confirming his criminal exposure. Rather than go to authorities, Henry supports Whitney’s attempted takeover of Pierpoint to delay scrutiny, unaware that Yasmin is working with Norton to shift public blame onto Henry and the Labour government. He later learns the takeover was a sham and that he never held a stake in Pierpoint. After Yasmin tells him she no longer loves him and asks for a divorce, Whitney urges Henry to flee to Lithuania, revealing Russian state intelligence is involved in Tender. Henry initially boards the plane but refuses to abandon his identity after seeing a forged passport, rebukes Whitney, and returns home, where he is arrested. He later accepts a plea deal for breach of fiduciary duty and attempts to relay his concerns to Bevan and Otto about Russian involvement, but is warned away by Otto, who cites the risk of assassination. Henry reconciles with Norton and serves house arrest at the family estate, where he is last seen fishing with Norton and Otto.

=== Petra Koenig ===
Petra Koenig (Sarah Goldberg) is a senior portfolio manager at FutureDawn Partners and one of Anna Gearing’s closest associates. Despite their long professional proximity, Petra’s relationship with Anna has grown strained over time. Although Petra is godmother to Anna’s children, she later reflects that the role was imposed by Anna’s seniority rather than freely chosen, and that Anna pushed for a personal closeness Petra did not seek. Petra’s pragmatic, results-driven approach to investing increasingly clashes with Anna’s rigid commitment to FutureDawn’s socially conscious ethos, which Petra regards as performative and strategically naïve.

In series 3, Petra becomes disillusioned with Anna’s leadership after Harper—then working at FutureDawn—helps her hedge exposure during the chaotic Lumi IPO by arranging credit default swaps on oil and gas assets through data she obtains from Yasmin. Impressed by Harper and frustrated by Anna’s constraints, Petra leaves FutureDawn to cofound a hedge fund with Harper, which they name LeviathanAlpha. The pair secure seed funding from Otto Mostyn and retain Pierpoint as their broker, before deciding to short Pierpoint after learning the firm’s ESG-backed debt is nearing maturity and effectively unsellable. Their plan unravels when Harper admits she first learned of the debt crisis through an improper disclosure, rendering the trade illegal. Petra alerts Otto, then reconciles with Harper to unwind the short and sever ties with him. Unbeknownst to Petra, Harper later secretly partners with Otto to launch a separate short-only fund, ending their collaboration.

=== Alexander Norton ===
Viscount Alexander Norton (Andrew Havill) is Henry Muck’s uncle and a powerful newspaper proprietor who owns several British tabloids. A wealthy aristocrat with a large country estate, he is a former Oxford classmate of Charles Hanani and a close ally of Otto Mostyn. In series 3, Norton works with Otto and Conservative MP Aurore Adekunle to exploit the collapse of Lumi and the failed Barclays acquisition of Pierpoint for political advantage. As Yasmin faces mounting negative press following her father’s embezzlement scandal and death, Norton offers to suppress damaging coverage and urges her to marry Henry, assuring her of his family’s protection and financial security. He also tells Yasmin he had long known of Charles’s predatory behavior and that she bears no responsibility.

In series 4, Norton remains involved in Henry’s life after his brief parliamentary career ends. Aware that Henry’s father died by suicide on his 40th birthday, Norton unsuccessfully tries to lift him from a depressive spiral during the same milestone. He meets with Labour MP Jennifer Bevan, Henry’s successor, who confronts him about his alarmist headlines about the economy, which she fears could contribute to a recession. Norton tells her that her superior, far-left business secretary Lisa Dearn, is "anti-business". After Henry becomes CEO of fintech company Tender, Yasmin enlists Norton to run headlines smearing financial journalist James Dycker (who is investigating Tender) as colluding with short sellers, which helps contribute to Dycker's firing. Later, once news of Tender's fraud breaks, Yasmin enlists Norton and one of his right-wing tabloids to circulate a lie that the Labour government suppressed internal concerns about Tender. Norton is aware Henry will bear the brunt of the fallout and will be unable to survive it, but reluctantly agrees to Yasmin's plan, reasoning that Henry is beyond saving. Months later, after Tender's downfall and Henry's arrest and divorce from Yasmin, Norton and Yasmin continue working together, taking on Reform MP Sebastian Stefanowicz as a PR client to cultivate his profile ahead of a possible PM bid. Norton and Henry reconcile after Henry accepts a plea deal, and he, Henry, and Otto are last seen fishing together.

=== Otto Mostyn ===
Otto Mostyn (Roger Barclay) is Henry's godfather, and a fellow classmate of Charles Hanani from Oxford alongside Norton. A sinister, calculating businessman, Otto takes interest in Harper due to her cunning and ruthlessness, and agrees to provide seed funding to LeviathanAlpha, the hedge fund she is starting with Petra Koenig. Otto, Norton, and Aurore are also in a secret cabal to advance their interests via the government. Petra calls Otto after learning that Harper committed insider trading by acting on confidential information she overheard to short Pierpoint. Otto summons Harper to a meeting, where instead of reprimanding her, he tells her he wants her to succeed him in running his investment fund. Harper and Petra ultimately decide to call off the short and end their partnership with Otto to keep their fund above-board, but Harper later teams up with Otto to start her own fund dedicated to shorting corrupt companies over whom she and Otto would have leverage.

In series 4, Otto becomes a member of the House of Lords and hopes to obtain a peerage. He puts increasingly strict constraints on Harper's trades at his fund, not wanting her to jeopardize his political connections; she eventually cuts ties with Otto. At Henry's 40th birthday party, Otto receives oral sex from Cordelia, Yasmin's aunt and Charles' sister; it is revealed he also received sexual favors from Charles. Otto later meets with Henry, who is being prosecuted for his role as CEO of the fraudulent fintech firm Tender, and asks Otto to make an official inquiry regarding the Russian government's involvement in the firm. Otto, however, talks Henry out of implicating Russia, citing the risk of assassination. Otto is later seen fishing with Norton and Henry, who serves house arrest at the Norton estate.

=== Denise Oldroyd ===
Denise Oldroyd (Fiona Button) is Yasmin's lawyer, and sister of her ex-boyfriend Seb. Denise represents Yasmin following the publication of her father's historic embezzlement from the family publishing company. She also has a brief affair with Eric that begins after he joins her and Yasmin on a cocaine bender. When Hanani Publishing decides to pay off Charles' various legal settlements in exchange for making Yasmin the face of the scandal, Denise encourages Yasmin to go along with the deal to protect the victims of Charles' sexual abuse, but Yasmin decides to fight her father's company in court.

=== Caedi McFarlane ===
Caedi McFarlane (Eliot Salt) is Henry Muck's personal assistant at Lumi, whose presence often calms him during his erratic outbursts. Caedi later files an anonymous complaint against Henry for repeated sexual harassment, which is mentioned in the government inquest against Lumi following its collapse.

=== James Ashford ===
James Ashford (Tom Stourton) is the CEO of Ashford Asset Management, and one of Lumi's primary investors. The day of the company's IPO, he confronts Henry about Lumi's inflated quarterly earnings reports and asks whether Pierpoint overvalued the company; Henry dismisses Ashford's concerns and returns his shares, forcing Pierpoint to scramble to find new investors. Harper later runs into Ashford in the park and learns from him that most banks are backtracking on their ESG investments, corroborating what she overheard Sweetpea telling Yasmin about Pierpoint's impending debt crisis. Harper uses what Ashford told her as legal cover for shorting Pierpoint.

In series 4, Ashford, who invested in Harper's short-only fund at Otto Mostyn's asset management firm, angrily confronts her about denying investors' redemption requests following her controversial short of porn aggregator Siren. He is revealed to have been in a sexual relationship with Harper, and tips her off that Otto is restricting her from jeopardizing his political connections in hopes of obtaining a peerage. Ashford suddenly collapses from a minor stroke and is removed from the office by paramedics.

=== Xander Lindt ===
Xander Lindt (Gustav Lindh) is a cocky young heir of the Lindt chocolate empire, and a member of Henry's entourage. He repeatedly demeans Yasmin after she rejects his sexual advances at a Swiss climate conference.

=== Vinay Sarkar ===
Vinay Sarkar (Asim Chaudhry) is Rishi's loan shark, and primary source of his gambling money. Rishi initially owes Vinay £200,000, which he is able to pay off after netting £18 million from his long on cable following a federal tax cut. Rishi, however, takes out another £50,000 loan to gamble away, and in the following months, his debt to Vinay inflates beyond £500,000. Vinay shows up unannounced to Rishi's apartment on the latter's birthday to tell Rishi and Diana how much he is owed; when Diana begins to berate Vinay for his predatory behavior and for enabling Rishi's gambling addiction, Vinay shoots her in the head and leaves.

In series 4, Rishi states that Vinay's charges were reduced to manslaughter after he pleaded insanity, claiming to have been mentally impaired after years of drug abuse, but that Diana's family is fighting the charges in court.

=== Whitney Halberstram ===
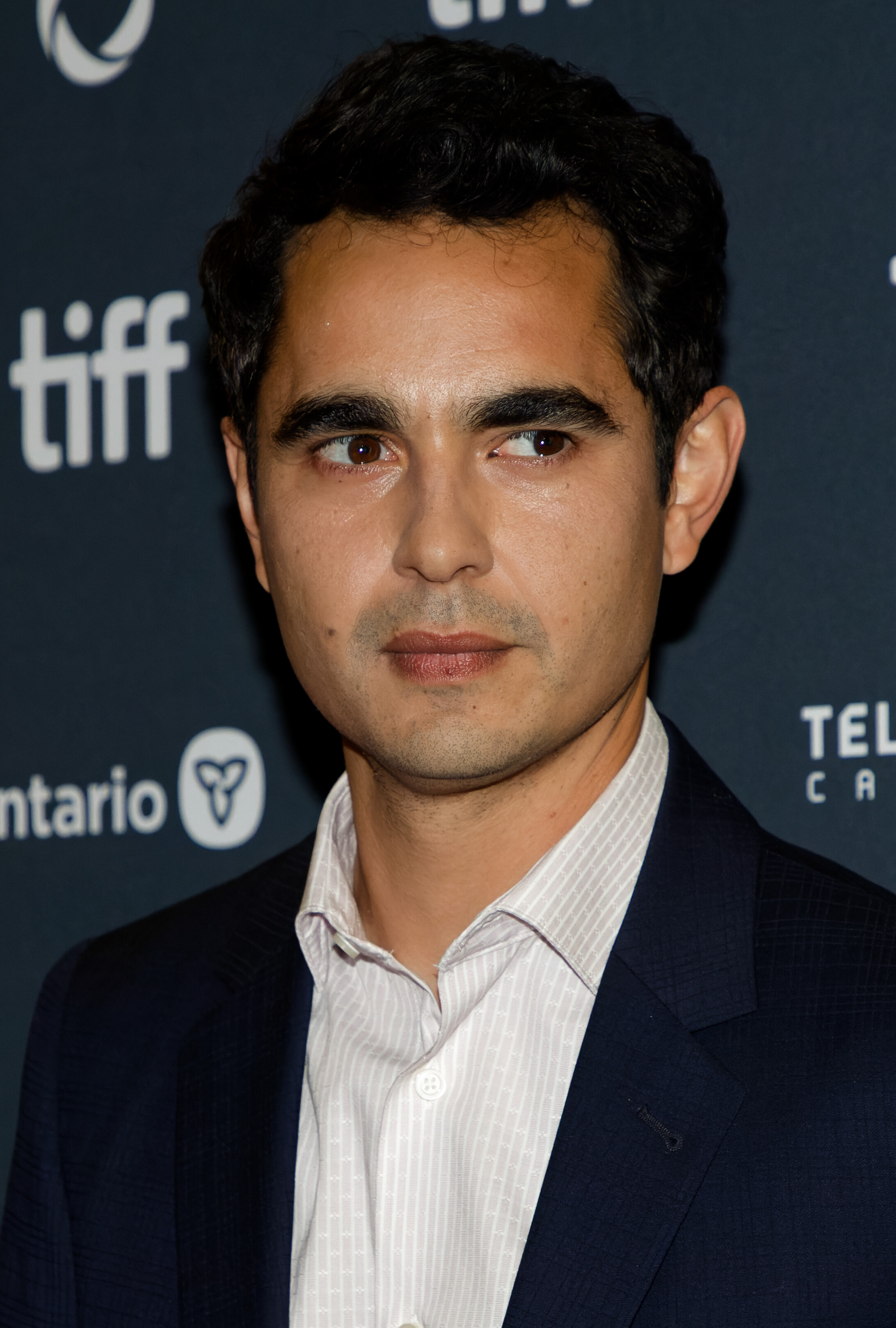
Max Minghella

Whitney Halberstram (Max Minghella) is the enigmatic co-founder and CFO of payment processing startup Tender, which he launches with college friend Jonah Atterbury. An American who claims to have grown up in poverty, Whitney frequently alters details about his background depending on his audience. He pivots Tender away from pornography and gambling clients toward banking, forcing Jonah out and installing himself as interim CEO. Whitney has a one-night stand with Harper and befriends Yasmin, who introduces him to Labour MP Jennifer Bevan for regulatory leverage in exchange for securing her husband Henry Muck a role at Tender. Whitney appoints Henry CEO to leverage his aristocratic connections and develops a sexual fixation on him. After learning Harper is shorting Tender and working with journalist James Dycker to investigate its African operations, Whitney and Yasmin move to discredit Dycker in print; Whitney then promotes Yasmin to head of communications.

After Harper publicly reveals that Tender falsified profits in Africa, the company’s stock drops sharply. Whitney is shown to be under pressure from Russian intelligence interests using Tender to collect UK consumer data. He persuades EMEA CFO Tony Day not to act as a whistleblower and proposes a hostile takeover of Pierpoint to delay scrutiny from auditors, falsely claiming he already owns a stake. He travels to New York with Henry for Pierpoint’s AGM but later attempts to flee, having secured a fake Lithuanian passport and hired a Japanese jōhatsu firm to facilitate his disappearance. His Russian handlers intercept him after tracing his burner phone and force him to proceed with the takeover attempt. As investigations mount, Whitney contacts Henry and urges him to flee with him to Lithuania, revealing the Russians' involvement in Tender; Henry refuses and leaves him. Some time later, news reports state that Interpol is still looking for Whitney.

A single frame of Whitney flashes onscreen right before the end credits of the series 4 finale; series creators Mickey Down and Konrad Kay revealed in an interview that the shot was from a deleted scene of Whitney at a club in Lithuania, looking through a glory hole, in a scene similar to his night out with Henry.

=== Jonah Atterbury ===
Jonah Atterbury (Kal Penn) is the co-founder and CEO of Tender, which he started with his college friend Whitney Halberstram. Once an ambitious business school graduate, Jonah has since devolved into an irresponsible and inattentive CEO, addicted to partying, drugs, and pornography, and frequently showing up intoxicated to the office. He clashes with Whitney over the latter's desire to pivot Tender away from lucrative "alternative merchants" like porn and gambling and towards banking. Whitney and the Tender board soon use behavioral clauses in Jonah's contract to remove him as CEO, citing his inappropriate behavior, poor hygiene, and misuse of company funds; Whitney takes over in the interim. Jonah is later contacted by Sweetpea Golightly, who is investigating Tender's shady finances as part of a short; a vengeful Jonah, who is suing Whitney for defamation, emails Sweetpea a trove of subpoenaed internal Tender emails that she uses to uncover a connection to Accra. After Tender's stock plummets following revelations of its fraud, Whitney attempts to contact Jonah, who rebuffs him.

=== Hayley Clay ===
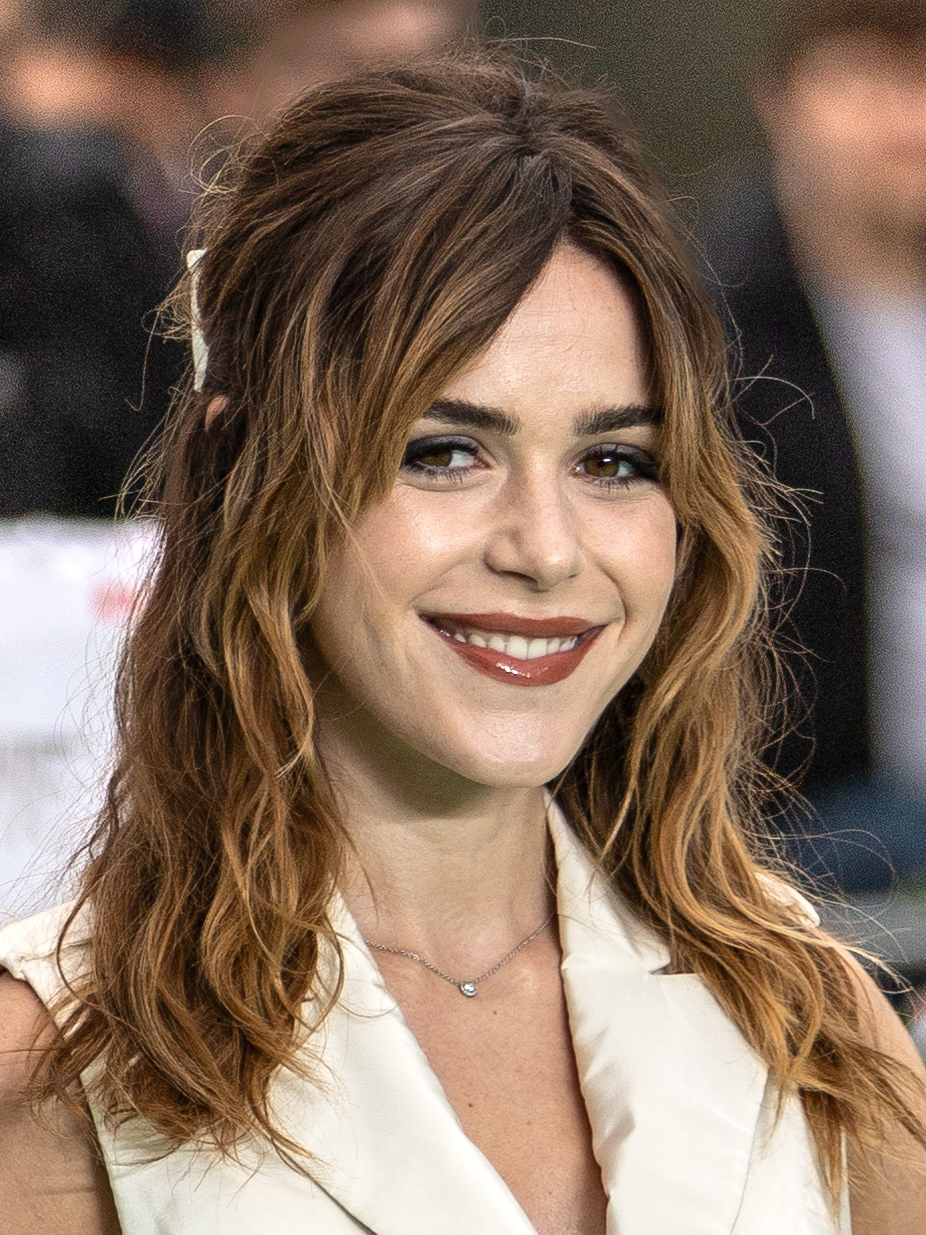
Kiernan Shipka

Hayley Clay (Kiernan Shipka) is Whitney Halberstram’s executive assistant at Tender. Recruited from an escort agency, she previously serviced wealthy clients to obtain compromising material, including an emir connected to Al-Mi’raj, Pierpoint's new owner. While at Tender, she spends a night with James Dycker, a financial journalist investigating the company, and later learns his identity. Before leaving her apartment, Dycker urges her to question the circumstances of her predecessor’s departure. Hayley asks Whitney directly; he claims the former assistant suffered from Crohn’s disease and that he privately funded her treatment. After Henry Muck becomes CEO, Hayley also serves as his assistant, and during a business trip to Vienna, Yasmin arranges a threesome involving Henry and Hayley.

As Dycker continues probing Tender’s laundering of illegal payments, Hayley files a sexual assault complaint against him. Combined with an article arranged by Yasmin alleging Dycker colluded with short sellers, the accusation leads to his dismissal. Whitney promotes Yasmin to head of communications, and Yasmin elevates Hayley to a senior communications role. Following reports exposing Tender’s fraudulent African profits, Hayley reviews Whitney’s emails and discovers her predecessor also came from the same escort agency. She resigns, confronting Whitney over employing her underage cousin Dolly to seduce Eric Tao. Hayley then approaches Yasmin, revealing that their threesome was recorded and that she is an escort, seeking leverage within British high society. Yasmin subsequently hires Hayley (along with Dolly) as an escort to entertain and extort powerful men around the world.

=== Jim Dycker ===
James "Jim" Dycker (Charlie Heaton) is an intrepid financial journalist at FinDigest who is investigating Tender. A former trader who suffered major losses in the collapse of FTX, Jim is now determined to revive his career by being the one to break the story on Tender's misconduct. He shares custody of an infant son with his colleague Elaine, who he impregnated during a one-night stand.

At the start of series 4, Jim follows Tender executive assistant Hayley Clay to a club, and the two spend the night in her apartment while she is intoxicated; she is enraged when he reveals his identity to her the following morning. Before Hayley kicks him out, Jim encourages her to look into the mysterious circumstances surrounding her predecessor's exit from the company. Jim later gets in touch with Harper, who is running a short-only fund, and tips her off that Tender is a strong target, having discovered that they are continuing to illegally process porn and gambling payments out of Africa despite publicly distancing themselves from those sectors to pivot to banking. Jim's tip leads Harper on her own investigation, but Jim himself is forced to publish a heavily edited version of the story. Tender leadership conspires to silence Jim after his discoveries, with Yasmin enlisting Lord Norton to defame Jim in the press as colluding with short sellers, using photos of him meeting Harper. Furthermore, Hayley files a sexual assault complaint against Jim. The allegation along with the article forces Jim's editor Edward Burgess to fire him; Jim subsequently meets Rishi at a bar, and the two go on a cocaine bender at the latter's apartment along with Dez Watkins, a man they met at the bar. Watkins gives them drugs and turns up the volume on Rishi's stereo before leaving, inciting a noise complaint that draws police to the apartment right as Jim overdoses and dies. Jim's death is later confirmed to be a murder, with Watkins revealed as an agent of Russian foreign intelligence who gave Jim cocaine laced with fentanyl.

=== Kwabena Bannerman ===
Kwabena Bannerman (Toheeb Jimoh) is an associate trader of Ghanaian descent working for Harper’s short-only fund at Mostyn Asset Management. He and Harper are casually involved, though his laidback temperament contrasts with her intensity and single-minded focus on the business. During her controversial short of porn aggregator Siren, Harper has Kwabena draft a forceful email to investors denying redemption requests. She later recruits him to join her new fund, SternTao, but liquidates his other positions to meet a margin call from Deutsche Bank. Kwabena travels to Accra with Sweetpea to investigate Tender’s operations; using family connections, he secures a meeting that helps them uncover falsified profits and recycled revenue at a local payment processor Tender had acquired. Harper presents their findings at an investment conference, triggering a 28% drop in Tender’s stock.

The Tender short ultimately nets £110 million, with Harper, Sweetpea, and Kwabena distributing £2 million each and scouting a new office for the fund. Kwabena accompanies Harper to Paris for a political fundraiser hosted by Yasmin but skips the dinner and later admits to Harper that he danced intimately with another woman that night and felt no guilt, questioning the emotional detachment in their relationship and her refusal to confront him about sleeping with Sweetpea. Harper acknowledges she avoids intimacy as self-protection, while Kwabena argues that isolating herself from those closest to her comes at too high a cost. He is later seen with Harper aboard a private jet while she is interviewed by Patrick Radden Keefe about the Tender short.

=== Jennifer Bevan ===
Jennifer “Jenni” Bevan (Amy James-Kelly) is a Labour Party politician who defeats Henry Muck in the 2024 general election and is appointed Minister of State for Industry. At the start of series 4, she introduces an online safety bill tightening age-verification rules for porn aggregators such as Siren, triggering a sharp drop in Siren’s stock and prompting Whitney Halberstram, CFO of Siren's payment processor Tender, to pivot away from pornography and gambling clients. Whitney seeks Bevan’s regulatory support through Yasmin, who invites her to Henry’s 40th birthday party, where Bevan meets Lord Alexander Norton, a newspaper proprietor concerned about legacy media’s declining influence under business minister Lisa Dearn. After Henry becomes Tender’s CEO, Yasmin lobbies Bevan to support Tender’s merger with an Austrian bank and its application for a UK banking license. At a regulatory meeting, the Prime Minister’s chief of staff pressures the Prudential Regulation Authority to approve the deal, citing press positioning Bevan as Labour’s new public face, and Bevan begins advocating for Tender.

When Tender’s fraud is exposed, Yasmin attempts to shift blame onto the Labour government by persuading Bevan to confirm that Dearn suppressed an internal memo raising concerns about Tender; Bevan refuses. Yasmin circumvents her and runs the headline regardless, leading to Dearn’s resignation and prompting Bevan to rebuke Yasmin for lying and allowing Henry to take the fall. Bevan later appears on television defending the government while acknowledging her own role in supporting Tender. After Henry is arrested and agrees to testify, he contacts Bevan about possible Russian intelligence involvement in Tender’s operations; she attempts to escalate the matter to the prime minister but is warned by the chief of staff against pursuing it further, due to the potential diplomatic ramifications and the credibility of Bevan's sources.

=== Sebastian Stefanowicz ===
Sebastian Stefanowicz (Edward Holcroft) is a Reform MP representing South Thanet. He is a former entrepreneur whose views align with the Dark Enlightenment movement, and counts Peter Thiel and Marc Andreessen as allies. Stefanowicz is first seen challenging Labour MP Jennifer Bevan's online safety bill on free-speech grounds. He later debates business secretary Lisa Dearn on a radio show about the Labour Party's complicity in Tender's fraud, accusing her of being in league with the company's senior management to expedite their banking license and regulatory approvals. Listening to the debate gives Yasmin the idea to enlist Norton's aid in pinning Tender's failure on the Labour government. After Tender's downfall, Yasmin and Lord Norton cultivate Stefanowicz's PR campaign ahead of a possible PM bid, with Norton suggesting they downplay Stefanowicz's antidemocratic and racially inflammatory rhetoric to broaden his voter appeal. Yasmin hosts a fundraiser dinner for Stefanowicz in Paris, attended by foreign donors illegally contributing to his campaign via UK shell companies.

=== Cordelia Hanani-Spyrka ===
Cordelia Hanani-Spyrka (Claire Forlani) is Yasmin's aunt and the sister of her late father Charles, working as a public relations executive. Yasmin invites her to Henry's 40th birthday, where Cordelia gushes about her relationship with a younger man, and advises Yasmin not to tie her future to Henry, warning that men invariably weaponize women's unconditional love. Yasmin later catches Cordelia performing oral sex on Otto Mostyn and confronts her afterwards, asking why she never came to Charles' funeral and whether she knew about his serial sexual predation; Cordelia dismisses her brother's behavior, arguing that both she and Charles came from a "bohemian childhood", and it is implied the two had an incestuous relationship in their youth. Before leaving, Cordelia spitefully tells Yasmin that Charles planned to terminate her before learning she would be born a girl.

=== The Commander ===
"The Commander" (Jack Farthing) is ostensibly an old friend of Henry's who shows up at his 40th birthday while an intoxicated Henry makes a scene before dinner guests. The Commander takes Henry to a pub where Henry spots his housekeeper Molly and her friend George; after George makes insulting comments about Yasmin, Henry viciously beats him at the Commander's provocation. The Commander is revealed to be Henry's hallucination of his late father, whose suicide on his own 40th birthday was witnessed by Henry as a child. Henry himself nearly attempts suicide the following morning in his father's vintage Jaguar E-Type via carbon monoxide poisoning, but relents at the last moment.

=== Johanna Bauer ===
Princess Johanna Bauer (Susanne Wuest) is the mother of Moritz Hunter-Bauer, heir to the family-owned Austrian bank IBN Bauer, with whom Tender is pursuing a merger. Yasmin, Henry and Whitney visit the Bauers' castle in Vienna to sway Moritz, who opposes the merger due to both data privacy concerns and his fascist political and economic beliefs. While on a walk with Johanna, Yasmin makes a deal to allow Moritz to publish his views in one of Lord Norton's columns in exchange for his backing the merger. Yasmin later finds one of Adolf Hitler's paintings in the room Johanna gave her to stay, confirming earlier rumors of the Bauers' ties to the Third Reich. Johanna and Moritz later attend Yasmin's fundraiser dinner in Paris for far-right MP Sebastian Stefanowicz. She and Moritz are seated beside Harper, to whom they make several racist innuendos.

=== Tony Day ===
Tony Day (Stephen Campbell Moore) is Tender’s EMEA CFO, based in Accra and described by Jonah as Whitney’s “lieutenant.” Sweetpea grows suspicious after seeing his name repeatedly in internal emails and learning he was promoted to CFO despite prior career failures, overseeing Tender’s acquisition of an African third-party payment processor. She travels to Accra with Kwabena to investigate. Day is initially evasive but later reveals that recently deceased FinDigest reporter Jim Dycker had discussed potential whistleblowing “pathways” with him. After Sweetpea uncovers evidence that Tender falsified profits in Africa by recycling fake revenue, Day agrees to be interviewed and travels to London to meet her and FinDigest editor Edward Burgess. Whitney intervenes and convinces him to stay loyal, having been warned that the Russian government (for whom Tender is a front) will assassinate Day if he speaks out; Day then appears on a live CNN debate to defend Tender’s African operations, reneging on his agreement with Sweetpea and Burgess. Day is ultimately arrested after Tender's downfall.

=== Kevin Rawle ===
Kevin Rawle (Pip Torrens) is the brash, conniving editor-in-chief of The Patriot, a right-leaning tabloid owned by Lord Norton. Yasmin enlists Kevin to circulate a fictitious claim that the Labour government suppressed an internal memo voicing concerns about Tender's fraudulent practices, thereby pinning the company's failure on the government and protecting her from legal and reputational fallout. She, Kevin and Norton attempt to persuade Labour MP Jennifer Bevan to be their source, but she refuses on principle. Yasmin later has Harper pass on the claim to FinDigest editor Edward Burgess, who publishes it; The Patriot then amplifies the claim, leading to the resignation of business secretary Lisa Dearn and opening Tender to fraud investigations and a new audit.

== Recurring characters and guest stars ==
=== Justin Klineman ===
Justin Klineman (Joshua James) is Pierpoint's head of HR. He is first seen pressing Harper to send over her college transcripts, unaware she never graduated; Harper sends forged documents. Eric, aware of Harper's past, reports her deceit to HR at the end of series 2, and Justin fires her. In series 3, Justin and another HR rep confront Rishi over his lewd and inappropriate comments on the trading floor, which he angrily dismisses. After Pierpoint is acquired by Al-Mi'raj, a holding company for the Egyptian sovereign wealth, the London trading firm is shut down, and Justin presides over a slew of employee terminations including Eric's.

=== Lucinda Young ===
Lucinda Young (Ruby Bentall) is a VP on Pierpoint's Investment Banking Division (IBD), overseeing Gus and Hari. She tacitly encourages Hari to overwork during his first week on the job; after Hari dies of a heart attack, Lucinda feels guilty, and worries whether she will be held culpable for Hari's death, telling Gus to vouch for her with HR. Lucinda is briefly seen in series 2 meeting with executives from healthcare startup Rican, for whom Pierpoint is helping engineer a major trade.

=== Seb Oldroyd ===
Sebastian Oldroyd (Jonathan Barnwell) is Yasmin's deadbeat, underachieving boyfriend. He lives in her expensive Notting Hill apartment, and spends most of his time getting high with his childhood friends. The lack of sexual passion in their relationship leads Yasmin to flirt with Robert. Seb attempts to make homemade sushi at a party thrown by Yasmin, but he accidentally cuts his hand with a knife, and the party is overall a failure. Yasmin decides to finally break up with Seb that night. Seb later visits Yasmin at work on reduction-in-force (RIF) day trying to make amends, but Yasmin rejects him for good, telling him he nearly killed her sex life.

=== Todd Barber ===
Todd Barber (Branden Cook) is Harper's ex-boyfriend from New York. The two remain sexually involved after their breakup, and he helps her forge her university transcripts when she is hired to Pierpoint. Todd later visits Harper in London; the two have a fight after Harper discovers he stole an expensive jacket from a patron at the nightclub they went to, where Todd calls Harper a coward and a hypocrite. Harper cuts ties with him for good.

=== Azar Kara ===
Azar Kara (Helene Maksoud) is Yasmin's mother, long divorced from her philandering husband and Yasmin's father Charles Hanani. She and Yasmin also have a strained relationship.

=== Candice Allbright ===
Candice Allbright (Alexandra Moen) is Eric's wife, with whom he has two daughters. She and Eric share a profane sense of humor. She later divorces Eric between series 2 and 3. In series 4, Candice and Eric learn that their daughter Lily has been expelled from school for catfishing another student; Candice blames Lily's behavioral issues on Eric's absence as a father. Eric lets Candice and Lily stay at the hotel suite serving as the office of SternTao, his hedge fund with Harper. Candice tells Eric not to "confuse regret with love."

=== Kaspar Zenden ===
Kaspar Zenden (Kåre Conradi) is a Dutch hedge fund manager, and the sole client of Pierpoint VP Clement Cowan. He cuts ties with Pierpoint after Clement is fired.

=== Diana Ramdani ===
Diana Ramdani, née Smith (Brittany Ashworth, series 2; Emily Barber, series 3) is Rishi's fiancée and later wife. Though she and Rishi have similar personalities, Rishi struggles to get along with Diana's wealthy white family due to racial and class disparities. In series 3, Diana is a housewife raising she and Rishi's newborn on a country estate the two purchased; their marriage is strained due to mutual infidelity and Rishi's gambling addiction, which has put him in severe financial debt. The two are separated by the end of series 3, with Diana living in an apartment in the city; Rishi comes to visit her for his birthday, but his loan shark Vinay is waiting for him, revealing to Diana that Rishi owes him over half a million pounds. When Diana begins to berate Vinay for his predatory behavior, Vinay shoots her dead and escapes.

=== Holly Newman ===
Holly Newman (Anna Wilson-Jones) is the widow of Eric's first boss and mentor, Newman. She and Eric were in a relationship while working as junior associates in New York, but Holly began an affair with Newman and later married him. She and Eric reconnect after Newman's death when Eric visits the New York office, and Eric secretly cheats on his wife with Holly before flying back to London.

=== Lily Tao ===
Lily Tao (played by an uncredited child actress in series 1, Neve Bonner in series 2-3, and Serrana Su-Ling Bliss in series 4) is one of Eric and Candice's daughters, alongside her twin sister Lara. In series 1, Harper spots Eric playing with his daughters in a grocery store after being suspended from Pierpoint. In series 2, Eric returns home from a trip to New York to kiss his children goodnight, having secretly cheated on their mother with his ex-girlfriend Holly during the trip. In series 3, Eric, divorced from Candice, brings his daughters to Pierpoint on the day of the tumultuous IPO of green-energy company Lumi.

In series 4, Lily is older and attending private school in England, while Eric is retired and living in the United States, estranged from his family. His family office, LilyLara, is named after his daughters. Eric returns to London to partner with Harper on a short-only hedge fund, SternTao, and allows Lily to visit the hotel serving as their office, blurring the work-life boundary Harper strives to maintain with Eric. Eric later learns Lily has been expelled from school for running a catfishing scheme on another student, and reflects on how his daughter has inherited his own cruelty, while lamenting his own inability to properly love his children. He comforts Lily and allows her and Candice to stay in his suite, but visits a prostitute that same night. Lily later attempts to bond with her father and tells him she loves him, but Eric is distracted when he receives blackmail revealing that the prostitute is underage and that their encounter was recorded. Eric subsequently dissolves his partnership with Harper to protect her from the potential scandal and leaves London.

Ken Leung, who plays Eric, revealed in an interview that the crew filmed a since-deleted scene between Eric and his family for the episode "Dear Henry", where he lashes out at Lily for wearing a nose ring (as it reminds him of Harper) before regretting his outburst and leaving to buy cigarettes. Leung noted that the scene immediately preceded the episode's closing shot depicting Eric walking down an empty street as the credits roll.

=== John-Daniel Stern ===
John-Daniel "JD" Stern (Adain Bradley) is Harper's estranged twin brother, who disappeared from her life when the two were teenagers. In series 2, Harper tracks down her brother to Berlin, where he works as a line cook. The two spend the night at a club, and the next morning, JD relapses on his meth addiction. The two have a vicious argument over their childhood growing up with an abusive mother; JD reveals he ran away in part due to Harper exacerbating the pressure their mother put on him to be a star tennis player, but Harper maintains that she too escaped a traumatic upbringing. Harper begs JD to come home with her, but rebuffs her, branding his sister a selfish narcissist who was complicit in the abuse he suffered. Harper is left deeply shaken by the encounter.

In series 4, JD calls Harper to tell her that their mother died in a freak accident, having fallen down the stairs while collecting an Amazon delivery. Harper struggles to grieve her mother's death given her traumatic childhood, as well as her preoccupation with her work.

=== Robert Spearing Sr. ===
Robert Spearing Sr. (Rick Warden) is Robert's working-class father, who works as a bartender. Robert Sr. was largely absent throughout his son's upbringing, which he left to Robert's domineering mother who died prior to the events of the series. Robert Sr. since remarried and had two children with his new wife, while remaining estranged from Robert. Robert visits his father in series 2, and breaks his sobriety after an argument with him. Robert Sr. finds his son drunk and passed out outside his apartment, and lets him stay the night; the two reconcile the morning after, with Robert Sr. assuring his son he has nothing to apologize for.

=== Jamie Henson ===
Jamie Henson (James Nelson-Joyce) is a constituent of Aurore Adekunle. He suffers from mental illness and repeatedly visits her office demanding to speak with her, claiming that unspecified people are harassing him and defecating on his street. Gus, working for Aurore, takes time to listen to Jamie's concerns, and refers him to a therapist. The two form a friendship that makes Gus realize he enjoys helping everyday people more than working in finance, until Aurore is forced to fire Gus.

=== Sadie Sackey ===
Sadie Sackey (Naana Agyei-Ampadu) is Gus' older sister, who works as a doctor for the National Health Service. Gus is closer to her than the rest of his overbearing family, but she too admonishes him to leave his low-paying but emotionally fulfilling job at Aurore Adekunle's public office in favor of something more lucrative and high-profile.

=== Mary Smith ===
Mary Smith (Melissa Knatchbull) is Diana's mother and Rishi's mother-in-law. After Diana's murder, Mary takes custody of Rishi and Diana's baby son, Hugo, granting Rishi limited visitation under her supervision. She later meets Rishi to sign her petition to change Hugo's last name to Smith, making it easier for the family to travel with him, in exchange for allowing Rishi continued visitation. She remains outwardly cordial with Rishi, asserting that her Christian faith supersedes her anger towards him.

=== Naomi Anderson ===
Naomi Anderson (Olivia Grant) is a Pierpoint attorney who helps the company through a government inquest against Lumi following its collapse. She and Eric decide to make Robert the scapegoat, which she reluctantly reveals to him following his tense testimony.

=== Lisa Dearn ===
Lisa Dearn (Chloe Pirrie) is the deputy energy secretary leading the government inquest against Lumi following its collapse. She presses Robert and Henry with pointed questions about Pierpoint's overvaluation of Lumi, as well as Henry's sexual harassment of his employees.

In series 4, Lisa is now Secretary of State for Business and Trade. Her far-left views trouble Lord Norton, who is concerned about the waning influence of legacy media under the new Labour government, and perceives her stance as anti-business. She and Minister for Industry Jennifer Bevan meet with Henry, now CEO of payment processing startup Tender, and CFO Whitney Halberstram, when the two seek regulatory approval for a merger with IBN Bauer Bank. Lisa is skeptical of the merger, deeming it monopolistic and self-serving on Henry's part, but the Prime Minister's chief of staff Ricky Martyn arrives to pressure the regulator into approving the merger lest Labour appear anti-business, with Bevan implied to have engineered the intervention. Government support for Tender forces Lisa to publicly back the company as beneficial to the UK consumer during the launch of its banking app, despite her personal skepticism and disgust for Henry. After news breaks of Tender's fraud, Yasmin plots to pin the company's failure on the Labour government, and circulates a lie in the press that Dearn suppressed an internal memo voicing concerns about Tender while expediting Tender's banking license and regulatory approvals. Dearn is subsequently forced to resign by Martyn, despite Bevan being Tender's real Labour champion.

=== Ferdinand Schwarzwald ===
Ferdinand Schwarzwald (Nico Rogner) is the CFO of family-owned Austrian bank IBN Bauer, and a director on the board of Tender, in which his bank has a 6% stake. He backs Whitney's vision for pivoting the company away from pornography and gambling clients and into banking, and cautions Whitney that his co-founder and CEO Jonah Atterbury is "not a serious person", contributing to Jonah's eventual removal from the company. Ferdinand later helps Whitney and new Tender CEO Henry Muck execute a merger with IBN Bauer, traveling with them to Vienna to assuage the concerns of family heir Moritz-Hunter Bauer. He and Whitney also procure a billion-dollar investment from Al-Mi'raj Pierpoint during the release of Tender's banking app.

Ferdinand is later revealed to be Whitney's handler on behalf of Russian foreign intelligence, having been recruited years ago by Cozy Bear (the hacker group affiliated with the FSB and SVR) and installed as IBN Bauer's CFO after stealing client lists that Russia could use as leverage. Amid public revelations of Tender's fraudulent profits out of Africa, Ferdinand warns Whitney that their narrative must remain intact, and implies that the Russians can assassinate anyone who goes "off-message". Ferdinand and fixer Dez Watkins later catch Whitney trying to disappear via New York and intercept him, forcing him to proceed with a hostile takeover bid for Pierpoint as it would represent a valuable "data set" for Russia. However, Tender is ultimately subject to a Serious Fraud Office investigation, and Ferdinand is last seen watching the police raid Tender's London office.

=== Robin Williamson ===
Robin Williamson (Jonjo O'Neill) is the chief communications officer at Tender, assisting Whitney in pivoting the company into banking. During the launch of Tender's banking app, Robin clashes with Yasmin over their dueling PR strategies, with Robin preferring a more traditional rollout via tech publications and podcasts, while Yasmin seeks to capitalize on Henry Muck's profile as CEO by booking him a keynote speech. Yasmin's approach wins over Whitney, who promotes Yasmin to head of communications and fires Robin, deeming him too traditional and risk-averse.

=== Edward Burgess ===
Edward Burgess (David Wilmot) is the crusading editor-in-chief of FinDigest, the financial publication Jim Dycker writes for. Burgess tells Jim that his investigation into Tender's payment laundering does not have enough verifiable evidence, forcing him to run a heavily edited-down version of the piece. Burgess is later forced to fire Jim after an article reveals his collusion with short sellers at SternTao, as well as a sexual assault allegation from Tender assistant Hayley Clay, who Jim had followed to a club and spent the night with. After Jim dies of a drug overdose, Burgess is contacted by Sweetpea Golightly, who tells him that Jim was "more right than he realized" about Tender being fraudulent, and sets up a whistleblower deal for Tony Day, Tender's EMEA CFO who is the face of the company's suspicious acquisitions in the region. However, Burgess and Sweetpea's interview with Day is sabotaged by Whitney, who persuades Day mere minutes before to remain loyal to Tender. Harper later goes to Burgess and has him publish a claim (concocted by Yasmin) that the Labour government suppressed internal concerns about Tender. Burgess reluctantly agrees, and his article is subsequently amplified by Norton's tabloids, opening Tender to a new audit and a fraud investigation.

=== Moritz-Hunter Bauer ===
Moritz-Hunter Bauer (Sid Phoenix) is the heir to the Austrian banking family behind IBN Bauer, with which Tender pursues a merger. He raises objections to the deal on data privacy and regulatory grounds, prompting Henry Muck and Whitney Halberstram, Tender's CEO and CFO respectively, to visit his family's castle in Vienna along with Yasmin to negotiate with him. Although Moritz presents his concerns as principled scrutiny, his views increasingly take on fascist overtones: he articulates a critique of liberal democracy and free-market capitalism and instead expresses admiration for authoritarian models of governance, citing Louis XIV as a political inspiration. He also makes an antisemitic insinuation at Whitney during dinner. Henry and Whitney decide not to continue engaging with him, but Yasmin makes a deal with Princess Johanna Bauer, Moritz's mother, to publish Moritz's views in one of Lord Norton's papers in exchange for his backing the merger. The next day, Moritz's article outlining his views, "The Case for a Benevolent Dictatorship", is published in a national column. Moritz and Johanna later attend Yasmin's fundraiser dinner in Paris for far-right MP Sebastian Stefanowicz. The two are seated beside Harper, to whom they make several racist innuendos.

=== Dolly Bird ===
Dolly Bird (Skye Degruttola) is an escort who Eric hires. She is later revealed to be from the same agency as Hayley Clay, her cousin. Dolly's sexual encounter with Eric was secretly recorded, and the video is sent to him alongside Dolly's passport showing her to be only 15 years old. The blackmail compels Eric to dissolve his partnership with Harper to protect her and the firm. Yasmin subsequently hires Hayley and Dolly to seduce and extort powerful men around the world, bringing them with her to a political fundraiser in Paris attended by illegal foreign donors. Harper is horrified at Dolly's presence after Yasmin shows her the video of Dolly with Eric, and attempts to convince Dolly to leave with her, but Dolly and Hayley rebuff her.

=== Dez Watkins ===
Dez Watkins (Martin Hancock) is a fixer working on behalf of Russian foreign intelligence to protect the interests of Tender. He is first seen approaching Rishi Ramdani and financial journalist Jim Dycker at a bar, warding off an apparent scammer. Rishi and Dycker invite Watkins for drinks and go back to Rishi's apartment to do drugs, where Dycker declares his plan to continue investigating Tender despite being fired by his publication. Watkins supplies them cocaine laced with fentanyl and raises the volume on Rishi's stereo before leaving, inciting a noise complaint that draws police to the apartment right as Dycker overdoses and dies from the poisoned drugs; Rishi is arrested while attempting to flee and is subsequently charged with manslaughter. Watkins later stops Whitney from attempting to disappear amidst escalating public scrutiny of Tender's fraud, having tracked him down to New York after Whitney's burner phone connected to airport WiFi. Watkins and Tender board member Ferdinand Schwarzwald (also a Russian asset) force Whitney to proceed with a takeover bid for Pierpoint, and warn Whitney that escape is not an option, with Watkins confirming that he murdered Dycker.
