= Myha'la =

American actress (born 1996)

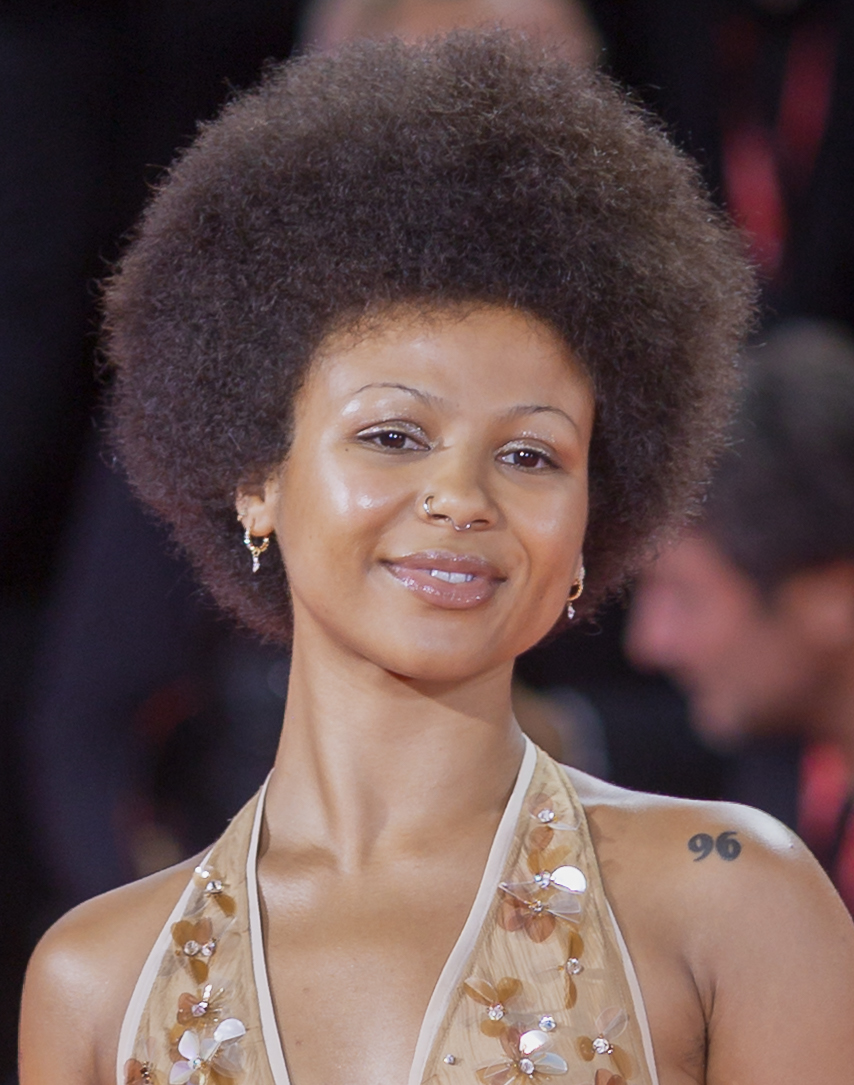
- Myha'la in 2025
- Born: Myha'la Herrold; April 6, 1996 (age 30); San Jose, California, U.S.
- Education: Carnegie Mellon University (BFA)
- Occupation: Actress
- Years active: 2017–present
- Spouse: Armando Rivera (m. 2025)

Myha'la Herrold (/maɪˈhɑːlə/; born April 6, 1996), known mononymously as Myha'la, is an American actress. She portrays Harper Stern in the British television drama Industry and had roles in the films Bodies Bodies Bodies (2022) and Leave the World Behind (2023).

== Early life and education ==
Myha'la was born and grew up in San Jose, California. Her mother, Susan (of English, French and German descent) ran a salon. Her father is Jamaican. She graduated from Archbishop Mitty High School in 2014, then attended Carnegie Mellon School of Drama, graduating in 2018.

== Career ==
Myha'la started her career acting primarily in theater roles, including a touring production of The Book of Mormon in 2017, playing Nabulungi. She played a small role in the indie film Premature (2019) and appeared in a 2019 episode of the television series Modern Love. In 2020, she began playing Harper Stern in the financial drama series Industry. In 2023, she starred in the Black Mirror episode "Loch Henry". She began to be known mononymously as Myha'la by 2023. Myha'la appeared on the second series of The Celebrity Traitors in October 2026, she became the third contestant to leave the competition after a wink towards fellow player Richard Grant drew suspicion.

== Personal life ==
She met Armando Rivera after he messaged her on Instagram, being a fan of her work on Industry. They married in 2025.

== Filmography ==
=== Film ===
Year	Title	Role	Notes	Ref.
2018	Rehabilitation of the Hill	Background		
2019	Premature	Dymond		
2019	The Tattooed Heart	Lulu	Short film	
2021	Plan B	Logan		
2022	Bodies Bodies Bodies	Jordan		
2022	The Honeymoon	Herself	Cameo; last film credit as Myha'la Herrold	
2023	Dumb Money	Riri	First mononymous credit as Myha'la	
2023	Leave the World Behind	Ruth Scott		
2025	Swiped	Tisha		
2025	Dead Man's Wire	Linda Page		
2026	They Will Kill You	Maria Reaves		

=== Television ===
Year	Title	Role	Notes	Ref.
2019	Modern Love	Tami	Episode: "So He Looked Like Dad. It Was Just Dinner, Right?"	
2020–present	Industry	Harper Stern	Main role	
2023	Black Mirror	Pia	Episode: "Loch Henry"	
2024	Moon Girl and Devil Dinosaur	Jurnee (voice)	3 episodes	
2026	The Celebrity Traitors	Contestant	Series 2	
