= They Will Kill You =

2026 film by Kirill Sokolov

- Theatrical release poster
- Directed by: Kirill Sokolov
- Written by: Kirill Sokolov; Alex Litvak
- Produced by: Andy Muschietti; Barbara Muschietti; Dan Kagan
- Starring: Zazie Beetz; Myha'la; Paterson Joseph; Tom Felton; Heather Graham; Patricia Arquette
- Cinematography: Isaac Bauman
- Edited by: Luke Doolan
- Music by: Carlos Rafael Rivera
- Production companies: New Line Cinema; Nocturna
- Distributed by: Warner Bros. Pictures (worldwide); Sun Africa Group (South Africa)
- Release dates: March 17, 2026 (SXSW); March 27, 2026 (United States)
- Running time: 94 minutes
- Countries: South Africa; United States; Canada
- Language: English
- Budget: $20 million
- Box office: $19.4 million

They Will Kill You is a 2026 action comedy horror film directed by Kirill Sokolov, from a script co-written with Alex Litvak. The film stars Zazie Beetz, Myha'la, Paterson Joseph, Tom Felton, Heather Graham, and Patricia Arquette. The film follows an ex-convict who answers an ad to be a housekeeper at a mysterious New York City high-rise that has seen a number of disappearances over the years. It is an international co-production film between South Africa, the United States and Canada.

They Will Kill You was released in the United States by Warner Bros. Pictures on March 27, 2026. The film received mixed reviews from critics and grossed $19 million worldwide.

== Plot ==
Asia Reaves and her younger sister, Maria, attempt to flee from their abusive father, but are cornered at a convenience store. Asia shoots him and is arrested after attempting to flee, while Maria remains in his custody.

Ten years later, Asia arrives at the Virgil, an exclusive high-rise building in New York City, posing as the new maid. She is greeted by Irish building manager Lily Woodhouse, who explains that the Virgil is 100 years old and occupied by the wealthy and elite. While Asia is sleeping, several masked intruders, including residents Kevin and Sharon, break in and attack her. They are shocked to discover Asia is armed and highly skilled at defending herself, managing to kill all of the assailants. Asia confronts Lily and demands the location of Maria, who works as a maid at the Virgil. Asia's attackers resurrect, forcing her to seek refuge in the building's vents.

Kevin and Sharon give chase, but Asia manages to dispatch Sharon with a shotgun blast to the head. Asia is saved by Lily's husband, Ray, who explains that the Virgil is a temple to Satan, and the residents have been made immortal by performing human sacrifices. The two travel up a floor, unaware they are being followed by Sharon's sentient eyeball. The two meet with Maria, who reveals she is aware of what is happening at the Virgil and does not want to leave. Asia knocks her unconscious, but she and Ray are attacked by the cultists. Asia and Maria escape up a floor via a dumbwaiter, while Ray is captured and tied up by Lily and Sharon, whose head has started to regrow.

In the kitchen, Asia and Maria confront one another. Maria explains she fled their father shortly before he died from cancer, working at sleazy motels until she was hired at the Virgil. Although she was initially due to be a sacrifice, she was spared and now enjoys the relative comfort of the building. Lily demands that all residents and staff track down the sisters. Maria saves Asia from a cultist before being captured. Asia pursues the cultists and slaughters most of them with a burning axe. The two try to climb to a fire escape via the elevator shaft, but are ambushed and captured by Lily and the cultists. Lily reveals that, to gain immortality, Maria must make a sacrifice: the maid Asia was posing as. However, failure to make the sacrifice would result in Maria's death.

The sisters and Ray are taken to the top floor, where the cultists summon Satan, who possesses the severed head of a pig to communicate, the names of the immortal cultists written on its skin. The pig removes Ray's name from its skin and forces Lily to murder him, permanently killing Ray. It then instructs Maria to write her name and kill Asia. Instead, Maria writes Asia's name and kills herself. Now immortal, Asia repeatedly kills Kevin, Sharon, and the cultists. Lily allows the severed pig head to take over her body and duels with Asia, who eventually overpowers her and removes the head. She then douses the pig's head in bleach and sets it on fire, removing the names, which results in the cultists all dying from their injuries. After the pig's head is sent hurtling down an elevator shaft and exploding in the process, Asia leaves carrying Maria's body.

Reuniting with an associate, Asia places Maria's body in the backseat, where she resurrects. Asia shows her that she has cut off her name from the pig's head and changed it to Maria. Now reunited, the sisters drive off as the top floor of the Virgil explodes.

== Cast ==
- Zazie Beetz as Asia Reaves, Maria's older sister and an ex-convict looking for a new job
- Myha'la as Maria Reaves, Asia's estranged younger sister who is one of the maids that works at the Virgil
  - Orefile Moloi as young Maria
- Paterson Joseph as Ray Woodhouse, Lily's husband
- Tom Felton as Kevin Sullivan, a member of the Satanic cult that inhabits the Virgil
- Heather Graham as Sharon Vanderbilt, a friend of Kevin and one of the members of the Satanic Cult in the Virgil
- Patricia Arquette as Lily Woodhouse, Ray's wife, the Irish superintendent at the Virgil and the leader of the Satanic Cult
- Gabe Gabriel as Short Steve
- James Remar as the voice of the Pig's Head
- Angus Sampson as Asia's private investigator and lawyer

== Production ==
In June 2024, it was announced that Zazie Beetz would lead They Will Kill You, an original film that would be the first under Andy and Barbara Muschietti's new production company, Nocturna. In July, New Line Cinema picked up the rights. In August, Myha'la, Tom Felton, Heather Graham, and Patricia Arquette joined the cast. Paterson Joseph also features in the cast.

The film was shot in Cape Town at the end of 2024, finishing in December of that year.

== Release ==
=== Theatrical ===
They Will Kill You premiered at the SXSW on March 17, 2026, and was also released on March 27, 2026, by Warner Bros. Pictures.

=== Home media ===
They Will Kill You was released on digital streaming on April 28, 2026, and on 4K Ultra HD Blu-ray, Blu-ray, and DVD on June 30, 2026.

== Reception ==
=== Box office ===
They Will Kill You grossed $11 million in the United States and Canada, and $8 million in other territories, for a worldwide total of $19 million.

=== Critical response ===
On the review aggregator website Rotten Tomatoes, 64% of 169 critics' reviews are positive, with an average rating of 6.2/10. The website's consensus reads: "A hyper-stylized battle royale with a vivid gothic setting, They Will Kill You's cyclical structure can grow repetitive but a fierce Zazie Beetz keeps the bloodletting infectiously fun." Metacritic, which uses a weighted average, assigned the film a score of 50 out of 100, based on 28 critics, indicating "mixed or average" reviews. Audiences polled by CinemaScore gave the film an average grade of "B−" on an A+ to F scale.
