= Aasiya Shah =

English actress

- Education: West London College
- Occupation: Actress
- Years active: 2015-present

Aasiya Shah is a British television and theatre actress, who has featured in both dramatic and comedic roles. Her television appearances include Raised by Wolves (2020-2022) and Bloods (2021-2022).

== Early and personal life ==
Shah is from Chingford, East London, and attended Rushcroft Sports College before completing a BTEC in acting at West London College in Hammersmith. Shah later participated in acting classes and workshops at the Lyric Hammersmith in London. She is of Pakistani descent.

== Career ==
Shah made her professional debut on stage in a production of Tipping the Velvet in 2015, directed by Lyndsey Turner at the Lyric Theatre Hammersmith. In 2017, she had her first lead role on stage appearing in a nationwide tour of Anita and Me, adapted by Tanika Gupta from the Meera Syal novel of the same name.

On television, Shah had early roles in The Level (2016) and Call the Midwife (2018), as well as Gemma Khan in two series of ITV1 police drama series Unforgotten (2017), and an appearance in BritBox thriller The Beast Must Die (2020-2021).

Shah played Holly in HBO Max science-fiction drama series Raised by Wolves (2020-2022), executive produced by Ridley Scott, who also directed episodes. On Sky Comedy, Shah had a main role as paramedic Kareshma in medical comedy series Bloods (2021-2022).

Shah has a recurring role in BBC One comedy series We Might Regret This (2024-present), which was commissioned for a second series shortly after debut. In 2025, Shah was cast alongside Daniel Mays, Miriam Petche, and Aimee-Ffion Edwards in British true crime drama series Believe Me. In 2026 Shah starred in Riz Ahmed comedy series Bait, for Amazon Prime Video.

== Filmography ==
Key
†	Denotes works that have not yet been released

Year	Title	Role	Notes
2016	The Level	Sun	1 episode
2017-2018	Unforgotten	Gemma Khan	6 episodes
2018	Call the Midwife	Parveen	1 episode
2020-2021	The Beast Must Die	Asha James	5 episodes
2020-2022	Raised by Wolves	Holly	17 episodes
2021-2022	Bloods	Kareshma	16 episodes
2024-present	We Might Regret This	Ty	7 episodes
2026	Bait	Q	6 episodes
2026	Believe Me	Laila	
