= Bloods (TV series) =

British television sitcom (2021–22)

- Opening title card
- Genre: Comedy; Medical drama
- Created by: Samson Kayo; Nathan Bryon
- Written by: Nathan Bryon; Paul Doolan; Samson Kayo
- Starring: Samson Kayo; Jane Horrocks; Lucy Punch; Julian Barratt; Aasiya Shah; Sam Campbell; Kevin 'KG' Garry; Adrian Scarborough; Katherine Kelly
- Opening theme: "Final Form" by Sampa the Great
- Country of origin: United Kingdom
- Original language: English
- No. of series: 2
- No. of episodes: 16

Production
- Producers: Seb Barwell (series 1); Debs Pisani (series 2)
- Production company: Roughcut Television

Original release
- Network: Sky Comedy
- Release: 5 May 2021 – 29 September 2022

Bloods is a British comedy television series created by Samson Kayo and Nathan Bryon. It stars Kayo and Jane Horrocks in the lead roles as paramedics based at the fictional South Hill ambulance station, as they deal with emergency medical calls. The first series premiered on 5 May 2021 on Sky Comedy. In August 2021, it was renewed for a second series, which was released in two parts, with the first part premiering on 16 March 2022, while the second premiered on 1 September. In October 2022, it was renewed for a third series, but the decision was ultimately reversed the following week.

== Cast and characters ==
=== Main ===
- Samson Kayo as Maleek
- Jane Horrocks as Wendy
- Lucy Punch as Jo
- Julian Barratt as Lawrence
- Aasiya Shah as Kareshma
- Sam Campbell as Darrell
- Kevin 'KG' Garry as Darryl
- Adrian Scarborough as Gary
- Katherine Kelly as George

=== Supporting ===
- Nathan Foad as Spencer
- Ellie White voices the Radio

== Episodes ==
Series	Episodes		Originally released	
Series	Episodes		First released	Last released
1	6		5 May 2021	9 June 2021
2	10	5	16 March 2022	13 April 2022
2	10	5	1 September 2022	29 September 2022

=== Series 1 (2021) ===
No. overall	No. in season	Title	Original release date
1	1	"Partners"	5 May 2021 (Note: All episodes of series 1 were available on demand 5 May 2021.)
Maleek is not impressed by new partner Wendy. Meanwhile, team leader Jo tries to flirt with grieving widower Lawrence, but is caught out by a major pile-up.
2	2	"Air Ambulance"	12 May 2021
Maleek reveals his dream of a job in the helicopter service after meeting a new paramedic. Elsewhere, Wendy makes an unwanted connection.
3	3	"Daycare"	19 May 2021
When Maleek bumps into old flame and single mum Nicole, Wendy sees the chance to get them together, by looking after her son.
4	4	"Bike Patrol"	26 May 2021
After their mishaps, the pair are split up as Maleek is punished with pushbike duty, while Wendy must work under Jo's observation.
5	5	"Siren Song"	2 June 2021
After discovering Maleek is a talented but reluctant singer, Wendy tries to encourage him. Kareshma resorts to desperate measures to get rid of Gary.
6	6	"Childbirth"	9 June 2021
With their partnership in tatters, Maleek and Wendy are forced to deliver a baby together on the underground.

=== Series 2 (2022) ===
No. overall	No. in season	Title	Original release date
Part 1
7	1	"Episode 1"	16 March 2022 (Note: Episodes 1–5 of series 2 were available on demand 16 March 2022.)
Jo is dismayed that her bosses have sent a counsellor, George, to South Hill to help improve the mental wellbeing of the paramedic team.
8	2	"Episode 2"	23 March 2022
George struggles to make a difference at South Hill, much to Jo's delight. Spencer gets a job at the depot and Darrell faces deportation back to Australia.
9	3	"Episode 3"	30 March 2022
Maleek and Wendy are sent out to a school to teach a knife crime awareness workshop - things do not go according to plan. Jo flirts with Lawrence and stonewalls George. Gary and Kareshma are reunited with Tasha.
10	4	"Episode 4"	6 April 2022
Wendy realises she has to address Spencer's poor behaviour when he spends the day on the road with her and Maleek. Jo makes an allegation against George.
11	5	"Episode 5"	13 April 2022
Jo hopes for a New Year's Eve kiss from Lawrence. Wendy and Maleek misdiagnose a reluctant patient and Darrell and Darryl decide to emigrate.
Part 2
12	6	"Episode 6"	1 September 2022 (Note: Episodes 6–10 of series 2 were available on demand 1 September 2022.)
Wendy and Maleek work a shift at a football match to take their minds off the upcoming Serious Incident Investigation.
13	7	"Episode 7"	8 September 2022
Wendy and Maleek face the Serious Incident Investigation panel - will their friendship survive intact? Kareshma finally admits she's struggling to deal with her concern for Tasha.
14	8	"Episode 8"	15 September 2022
Maleek struggles in the aftermath of the Serious Incident Investigation. While Jo debates whether to attend the HART training course, there's devastating news for Kareshma and Gary.
15	9	"Episode 9"	22 September 2022
With Jo away at HART training, Gary finds himself in charge or the depot. Lawrence decides it's time to make his feelings know. Wendy helps Maleek get his confidence back.
16	10	"Episode 10"	29 September 2022
Darryl and Darrell decide to host a leaving party - despite the fact that Darrell has now been granted Right to Remain in the UK. The South Hill Gang are anxious for a chance to let their hair down, but will the evening end in tears?

== Production ==
Samson Kayo initially created a comedy short for Sky titled New Bloods in 2018. Following its success, the six-episode first series of Bloods was commissioned. The series was filmed on location across South London, primarily in Lewisham. Research for the series involved meeting with medical professionals including two of Kayo's friends who are paramedics to try and set the right tone, to reflect the detached 'gallows humour' but also the unusual personal lives of responders.

In August 2021, it was renewed for a second series. In October 2022, it was renewed for a third series but the decision was ultimately reversed the following week.

== Broadcast ==
The first series premiered on 5 May 2021 on Sky Comedy. The first half of the second series premiered on 16 March 2022 and the second half premiered on 1 September 2022.

== Reception ==
Sean O'Grady of The Independent gave the show five stars, calling it "a magnificent paramedic comedy full of gallows humour". The series received a 100% fresh rating on Rotten Tomatoes based on 7 reviews.

Lucy Mangan for The Guardian gave the series three out of five stars, arguing that "the charm of Kayo and Horrocks make the otherwise laugh-free show worth watching"

Bloods was nominated for two Royal Television Society scripted comedy awards, and three BAFTA awards. Series 2 was nominated for the Rose d'Or award in 2022.
