= Octonauts: Above & Beyond =

Television show

- Promotional poster
- Based on: Characters by Meomi: Vicki Wong and Michael C. Murphy
- Directed by: Patrice Bérubé
- Voices of: Simon Greenall (speaking); Simon Foster (singing); Rob Rackstraw; Paul Panting; Keith Wickham; Jo Wyatt; Teresa Gallagher; Helen Walsh; Antonio Aakeel; Kate Harbour; William Vanderpuye; Chipo Chung; Elena Saurel; Alan Marriott
- Theme music composer: Darren Hendley
- Composer: Darren Hendley
- Countries of origin: United Kingdom; Canada
- Original language: English
- No. of seasons: 6
- No. of episodes: 78 (148 segments)

Production
- Executive producer: Andrew Hymas
- Producers: Michael Hefferon; Steve Jacobson; Rachel Simon; Kim Dent Wilder
- Editor: Tanner Adams
- Running time: 25 minutes
- Production companies: Mainframe Studios; Sony Pictures Television Kids

Original release
- Network: Netflix (Worldwide); CBeebies (UK)
- Release: 7 September 2021 – present

Related
- Octonauts; Octonauts: Journey to China

Octonauts: Above & Beyond is an animated children's television series that is the successor and spin-off of Octonauts. Produced by Sony Pictures Television Kids (formerly Silvergate Media) and animated by Mainframe Studios for Netflix, the spin-off series premiered on 7 September 2021 on Netflix. The series follows a similar structure to the original Octonauts series, but is primarily focused on terrestrial creatures and habitats. In addition, to cover this global range of missions, more characters join the crew as main characters in the series.

A second series debuted on 2 May 2022 on Netflix. A third season debuted in China on 26 May 2023 and 16 October 2023 on CBeebies and the BBC iPlayer, with an unspecified release date on Netflix. A fourth season debuted on February 19, 2024, on CBeebies and the BBC iPlayer. In May 2025, a fifth season was released in China in both English and Chinese. On May 29, 2026, a sixth and final season was released in China in both English and Chinese.

== Characters ==
The Octonauts, consisting of the Octopod crew and captain, are the recurring main characters.

=== Original main characters ===
These are the Octonauts that were in the original series, including the captain. They are unchanged in Above & Beyond, with the exception of the Vegimals, who are voiced by Kate Harbour. Everyone's previous actors from the original series reprise their roles here.

- Barnacles (voiced by Simon Greenall; singing voice provided by Simon Foster) is a polar bear who is the captain of the Octonauts. He is skilled in piloting many vehicle and is strong enough to lift a giant clam. In the episode "The Caves of Sac Actun", it is revealed that Barnacles is claustrophobic.
- Kwazii (voiced by Rob Rackstraw) is a cat lieutenant and cryptozoologist who speaks in a Cockney accent. Kwazii is a daredevil cat with a mysterious pirate past. He believes in many sea monsters such as the Nackerwhack, Tri-Toothed-Terror, Giant Shrimp Monster and Monster of Creepy Cove.
- Peso (voiced by Paul Panting in the British version, Wayne Grayson in the American version) is a penguin with a British accent (Spanish accent in the US version) and the medic of the Octonauts. He is not fond of scary situations, but steps up if someone is hurt or in trouble.
- Professor Inkling (voiced by Keith Wickham) is a dumbo octopus who speaks in a posh accent. Inkling is an oceanographer and assembled the Octonauts to study the oceans.
- Dr. Shellington (voiced by Keith Wickham) is a sea otter who speaks with a Scottish accent. Dr. Shellington is a biologist who assists the Octonauts on missions. He is not a very good driver and once crashed the GUP-D.
- Tweak (voiced by Jo Wyatt) is a rabbit who speaks with a Southern-US accent. Tweak works as an engineer and is based in the launch bay, where she created the GUP-X and GUP-S.
- Dashi (voiced by Teresa Gallagher in the UK version, Jenny Yokobori in the US version) is a Dachshund who is the photographer for the Octonauts and takes care of all the computers aboard the Octopod. She is also a professional surfer.
- Tunip (voiced by Kate Harbour) is a Vegimal who is half-tuna, half-turnip, but has the outward appearance of a harbour seal mixed with a turnip. He loves to make kelp cakes and work in the greenhouse as the Octonauts' head cook and gardener.

=== New main characters ===
These are the characters that were added to the Octonauts crew in the series Above & Beyond. They are known as Octo-Agents, friends of the Octonauts who are stationed all over the world. They are experts and adventurers that assist the Octonauts on their new land missions. All Octonauts and Octo-Agents are able to sound the Octo-Alert via new pieces of equipment called Octo-Watches (except Barnacles, who still has his Octo-Compass, and Tunip).

- Paani (voiced by Antonio Aakeel) is a macaque who joins the Octonauts as an Octo-agent in the first episode of Above and Beyond. He is a hydrologist who studies how water affects all kinds of beings. He is brave and daring, and also impulsive, similar to Kwazii. He gets off on the wrong foot with Kwazii, though, because Kwazii catches him trying to steal supplies from the team to assist animals affected by a drought.
- Calico Jack (voiced by Rob Rackstraw) is a pirate who is Kwazii's grandfather. He travels the sea with Pete, his parrot sidekick.
- Ranger Marsh (voiced by Keith Wickham) is a rabbit and Tweak's father. He works as a park ranger in the Everglades and loves to explore swamps.
- Pearl (voiced by Kate Harbour) is a sea otter and Shellington's older sister. She works as a marine biologist.
- Ryla (voiced by Helen Walsh) is a wombat and old friend of Dashi who specializes in cave diving.
- Tracker (voiced by Paul Panting) is a polar bear and Barnacles's former protégé. He is the radio operator for the Polar Scout Emergency Post in the Arctic. Starting from Season 3, Tracker is frequently shown engaging in birdwatching.
- Professor Natquik (voiced by Simon Greenall) is an Arctic fox and Barnacles's former mentor who specializes in field research.
- Min (voiced by Chipo Chung) is a red panda who is an old friend of Professor Inkling. She resides in the Yangtze and specializes in mapmaking.
- Koshi (voiced by Teresa Gallagher) is a young Dachshund and Dashi's younger sister who is interested in mysteries. She works as a junior Octo-Agent.
- Pinto (voiced by Teresa Gallagher in the UK version, Jamie Kelton in the US version) is a penguin and Peso's little brother who is a quick thinker. He works as a junior Octo-Agent.
- Periwinkle (voiced by Teresa Gallagher) is the son of Pearl and Shellington’s nephew. Unlike Koshi or Pinto, he is not a junior Octo-Agent.
- Orson
- Ursa
- Selva (voiced by Elena Saurel) is an iguana who debuted in the third season. Originally living in the Amazon rainforest, she joined the Octonauts as a botanist and junior Octo-Agent after encountering Shellington and the Vegimals.
- Bud (voiced by Alan Marriott) is a beaver whose family taught Tweak everything she knew as an engineer during her youth. He later joined as Tweak's protege and spent much of his time traveling the world to study engineering in nature.
- Haraka is a cheetah who specializes in keeping creatures healthy and studies their capabilities. She was introduced in the fifth season.

== Vehicles ==
These are the new vehicles that appear in Above & Beyond, in addition to the vehicles from the original series. These new vehicles specialize in terrestrial missions, and are thus referred to as "Terra-GUPs" (abbreviated as "TG"). All vehicles are equipped with an Octo-Alert.

- The Octoray is the Octonauts' ship and remote base. It is modeled after a manta ray.
- The TG-1 is a small all-purpose vehicle modeled after a beetle. It is equipped with expandable legs, a horn similar to that of a rhinoceros beetle, "super-gripper" feet, and wings.
- The TG-2 is a strong vehicle modeled after a giant pangolin. It can move by rolling like a ball, is equipped with a drill, and can use its front legs like shovels.
- The TG-3 is an excavator and mobile crane modeled after a giraffe weevil.
- The TG-4 is a large, lightweight utility vehicle modeled after a sea turtle that can operate in the water.
- The TG-5 is a utility vehicle modeled after a centipede. It consists of five cockpits attached to each other, with each being able to hold one person. The TG-5 has powerful treads that allow it to climb, as well as pincer claws.
- The TG-6 is a two-seat high-speed flying vehicle modeled after a hummingbird.
- The TG-7 is a hoverbike modeled after a snowshoe hare. It is equipped with four propellers that can erase animal tracks.
- The TG-8 is a mobile greenhouse modeled after an elephant. It possesses two solar panels shaped like elephant ears for power and is equipped with a watering hose.
- The TG-9 is an armored vehicle modeled after a rhinoceros that can navigate rough terrain. It has two 'rhino ears' that can pick up delicate noises, as well as speakers that can broadcast recorded audio.
- The TG-10 is a medical hovercraft modeled after a bumblebee that was created for Peso's use. It has two propellers that allow it to fly and access hard to reach places.
- The TG-11 is a medical vehicle modeled after a lizard which can split into three vehicles.
- The TG-12 is a vehicle created by Bud and modeled after an ostrich. It features two expandable legs that allow it to run fast, and it also features a motion detector patterned after an ostrich's neck and face.

== Episodes ==
=== Series overview ===
Series overview
Series	Segments	Episodes	Originally released
1	25	13	7 September 2021
2	25	13	2 May 2022
3	25	13	9 October 2023
4	25	13	19 February 2024
5	25	13	29 May 2025
6	24	13	29 May 2026

=== Season 1 (2021) ===
No. overall	No. in season	Title	Octo-Alert sounded by	Original release date
1	1	"The Octonauts and the Skeleton Coast Adventure"	Barnacles	7 September 2021
After being beached on the Skeleton Coast following a storm, the crew encounters Paani, a macaque working as a hydrologist, and soon find themselves working to help a herd of elephants find water. Note: This is the only episode of Above & Beyond to use the Octo-Alert sequence from the original series. A new sequence would be used from the next episode onwards.
2	2	"The Octonauts and the Land of Fire and Ice"	Paani (offscreen)	7 September 2021
2	2	"The Octonauts and the Beetle Invasion"	Calico Jack (offscreen)	7 September 2021
During a volcanic eruption in Iceland, a volcano begins melting the ice of the glacier sitting on top of it, threatening to flood a valley below and take out two reindeer herds unless Dashi, Peso and Paani can evacuate them. Kwazii sets off to assist Calico Jack in taking a group of bombardier beetles to a new island home, but they have to find the group's scout first, and he is proving difficult to catch. Note: These episodes are the first in the series to use the redesigned Octo-Alert sequence, which would become a permanent fixture for the rest of the series' run.
3	3	"The Octonauts and the Wild Windstorms"	Kwazii (offscreen)	7 September 2021
3	3	"The Octonauts and the Siberian Salamander"	Paani	7 September 2021
After a delivery run to ferry supplies to Professor Natquik in Antarctica, Dashi must fly to a tropical island with Peso and Tweak in tow to help Kwazii and Pete rescue Calico Jack from a pile of trees. However, Dashi has to fly through a fierce windstorm first. Paani loses his soil sampling pole while doing research in Siberia with Professor Inkling. When Dashi and Peso arrive, the group discovers a Siberian salamander frozen in ice, and after she wakes up, all present are in danger, with underground methane deposits beginning to blow.
4	4	"The Octonauts and the Hot Spring Snake"	Paani (offscreen)	7 September 2021
4	4	"The Octonauts and the Devil's Hole Pupfish"	Pearl (offscreen)	7 September 2021
Paani rescues a Bailey's snake from a mudflow in the Himalayas and calls for backup, which arrives in the form of Dashi, Tweak and Tunip in the new Terra-Gup 1. The group now has to find the snake a new hot spring to call home. After the Great Basin Desert gets hit by an earthquake from Alaska, Pearl calls for backup to help clear rocks off an algae patch in Devils Hole so that the pupfish can access their food. Peso, Dashi, and Shellington arrive to help, but the severity of the situation very quickly rises.
5	5	"The Octonauts and the Australian Outback Mystery"	Barnacles (offscreen)	7 September 2021
5	5	"The Octonauts and the Antarctica Rescue"	Professor Natquik	7 September 2021
Towards the end of their Australian vacation, Dashi and Koshi receive a weather warning and begin evacuating the local area before a flash flood hits. But after helping two kangaroos and a bearded dragon, the duo have to find a pregnant desert crab. Dashi and Paani head off for Antarctica to help Professor Natquik investigate the possibility of running water in Antarctica. However, when a lost skua comes into the picture, Paani and the misplaced seabird have to rely on Natquik and Dashi for a rescue.
6	6	"The Octonauts and the Caterpillar Caravan"	Min	7 September 2021
6	6	"The Octonauts and the Curious Penguin"	Shellington (offscreen)	7 September 2021
Dashi and Min discover a group of Quino checkerspot caterpillars while mapping a valley, but while the bugs nap until more plantains grow, the two must move them and keep them safe with the help of Shellington and Tunip. Peso's little brother Pinto must return home from his stay with the Octonauts, but while attempting to help Dashi, he becomes distracted, which becomes problematic when both she and Paani get stuck in a boiling sulfur pool in Yellowstone National Park.
7	7	"The Octonauts and the Rocky Mountain Rockslide"	Paani	7 September 2021
7	7	"The Octonauts and the Bamboo Rescue"	Min (offscreen)	7 September 2021
Paani calls in for backup when a rockslide begins in the Rocky Mountains, which arrives in the form of Barnacles, Tweak, and a few Vegimals in the new Terra-Gup 2. Unfortunately, they have to evacuate some stubborn mountain goats who are not keen on leaving. Barnacles, Dashi, and the Vegimals set off to help Min relocate a giant panda who just ate up an entire bamboo grove in China. Unfortunately, things get complicated when a second one shows up halfway to the bamboo.
8	8	"The Octonauts and the Hurricane Hunter Adventure"	Tweak	7 September 2021
8	8	"The Octonauts and the Little Goby"	Tominnow	7 September 2021
Dashi, Paani, and Tweak follow a developing hurricane to track its direction. When they reveal that the storm is heading for the Everglades, however, the Octo-Ray gets caught in the fierce winds, preventing them from assisting Ranger Marsh. While the Octonauts are clearing up an island after a tropical storm, the Vegimals attempt to help a misplaced goby return to his home pond. Kwazii soon shows up to help, especially when a hungry bird comes after the goby.
9	9	"The Octonauts and the Golden Mole"	Dashi	7 September 2021
9	9	"The Octonauts and the Giant Weta"	Paani	7 September 2021
Kwazii joins Tracker in a survival test in the Sahara Desert. However, a young golden mole and Kwazii's misplacement of their supplies mean that they quickly encounter problems when a sandstorm hits. Paani, Shellington, and Kwazii search New Zealand for a wētā in trouble, but after three duds discover that the endangered wētā is a giant wētā, one who is in danger of being eaten by hungry rats.
10	10	"The Octonauts and the Sleepwalking Dormice"	Paani	7 September 2021
10	10	"The Octonauts and the Harlequin Duck"	Pete the Parrot	7 September 2021
Paani discovers a nest of dormice that have prematurely woken from their hibernation, but when Shellington and Tweak arrive to help, all three have to hurry before the dormice get caught by a hungry weasel. While examining the results of coastal erosion on an island's shoreline, Kwazii, Tracker, and Calico Jack have to reunite a harlequin duck mother with her wayward nest. Unfortunately, a clever and hungry raven manages to fool Calico Jack and steal an egg.
11	11	"The Octonauts and the Mountain River Cave"	Ryla	7 September 2021
11	11	"The Octonauts and the Nine-Banded Armadillo"	Ranger Marsh	7 September 2021
While on a spelunking expedition in the Hang Son Doong caves, Kwazii, Shellington, and Ryla get trapped when an unexpected rainstorm hits and are trapped with an Indochinese tiger. Tweak, and Dashi set off to help Ranger Marsh track down a turtle egg that vanished after a swamp fire, narrowing the suspect down to a misplaced nine-banded armadillo.
12	12	"The Octonauts and the Fire Ants"	Paani	7 September 2021
12	12	"The Octonauts and the Flying Foxes"	Dashi	7 September 2021
After Paani gets swept up by a river flood in a rainforest downpour, Dashi and Tweak arrive to check on him and discover a colony of fire ants doing so. Unfortunately, the insects climb onto the Octo-Ray while a bigger storm is approaching. Peso and Dashi get stranded in the Australian wilderness after the Octo-Ray overheats while cooling off some flying foxes. However, they must hurry to help a flying fox mother and her baby, who is overheating.
13	13	"The Octonauts and the Puffin Colony"	Peso	7 September 2021
13	13	"The Octonauts and the Monster Digger"	Tweak	7 September 2021
Peso and Tunip are helping to feed a puffin colony's new pufflings while Kwazii tries to fend off a seagull until Barnacles returns with some missing puffins. While responding to Paani after losing contact with him, Peso, Tweak, and Tunip have to stay with him until a lightning storm passes so Dashi can pick them up. Unfortunately, Tunip gets stuck in a landslide, but the others receive help in the form of a neighboring giant pangolin.

=== Season 2 (2022) ===
No. overall	No. in season	Title	Octo-Alert sounded by	Original release date
14	1	"The Octonauts and the Snag Hotel"	Min	2 May 2022
14	1	"The Octonauts and the Stubborn Albatross"	Pearl	2 May 2022
While working with the Octonauts to clear fallen trees in Thailand, Min finds a snag tree home to numerous creatures. Unfortunately, a stubborn sun bear sees it as nothing but a back scratcher, and not willing to give it up causes many problems when the snag is to be moved to avoid him. While doing research in the Pacific Ocean, Pearl discovers that an atoll is on the verge of sinking. Unfortunately, the atoll is an albatross nesting ground, and the resilient birds refuse to move until it's too late.
15	2	"The Octonauts and the Honey Badger"	Paani	2 May 2022
15	2	"The Octonauts and the Pink Glacier"	Pearl	2 May 2022
Paani finds a honey badger is hogging a watering hole during the dry season in the African savanna. When they look deeper, though, they find the badger has an injury but is too prideful to accept treatment. Pearl discovers a river in the Yukon has flooded due to a fast-melting glacier, and while Tweak deals with some pikas, she, Kwazii, and Dashi set out to reverse to the problem that caused the flooding: red algae turning the glacier snow pink.
16	3	"The Octonauts and the Cold Snap"	Ranger Marsh	2 May 2022
16	3	"The Octonauts and the Mystery of the Longfin Eels"	Koshi	2 May 2022
Ranger Marsh wakes up to discover the Everglades in the middle of a cold snap, and the Octonauts are dispatched to check on any animals that may be affected by the cold. Koshi recounts the time that she, Dashi, and Shellington uncovered the mystery of the missing baby longfin eels.
17	4	"The Octonauts and the Lonely Frog"	Paani	2 May 2022
17	4	"The Octonauts and the Jungle Ghost"	Tweak	2 May 2022
Paani finds a long-thought extinct Sehuencas water frog and calls for backup in searching for some more in Bolivia. Unfortunately, the chances are slim with the given natural hazards. While camping near the African jungle, Kwazii and Tweak find their campsite raided and their supplies stolen, leading them and Tracker to discover some nearby okapis.
18	5	"The Octonauts and the Red Fox"	Professor Natquik	2 May 2022
18	5	"The Octonauts and the Pygmy Sloths"	Kwazii	2 May 2022
Professor Natquik returns to his family burrow in Siberia for a long-deserved break, but he discovers a red fox and his kits have made themselves home in it. Now, they're stuck together when the snow falls and buries them. Kwazii, Calico Jack, and the Vegimals are planting mangrove trees when they discover a number of sloths swimming on the coast. However, things get dicey when a baby sloth is lost at sea.
19	6	"The Octonauts and the Secret Beneath the Snow"	Paani	2 May 2022
19	6	"The Octonauts and the Salt-Mining Elephants"	Dashi	2 May 2022
While studying in winter near the Great Lakes, Paani encounters a ruffed grouse and an ice storm traps him with the bird under the snow. Now, Peso and Tweak have to save him using the subnivean zone before hungry wolves reach the pair. Ryla invites Dashi to some caves in Africa, and both discover elephants scraping salt off the walls. However, an encounter with hungry hyenas traps them all in a rockslide, and the team must keep the hungry predators away until the rescue is complete.
20	7	"The Octonauts and the Barnacle Geese"	Paani	2 May 2022
20	7	"The Octonauts and the Missing Lake"	Tracker	2 May 2022
While doing research in the mountains, Paani encounters a barnacle goose gosling that keeps jumping off a high cliff. This encounter quickly spirals into a dramatic adventure for birds. Tracker searches for a lake in Ireland for a campsite check and ends up in a sinkhole with a red deer and a natterjack toad, requiring Ryla to rescue them before the tunnels they're trapped in floods.
21	8	"The Octonauts and the Monitor Lizards"	Ranger Marsh	2 May 2022
21	8	"The Octonauts and the European Bison"	Shellington	2 May 2022
Ranger Marsh recalls his time checking on the invasive Nile monitor lizards in the Nile River. Tweak, Shellington, Pearl, and Periwinkle find an injured wisent in the Białowieża Forest far from his herd and attempt to help him regain his lost mobility. Unfortunately, a nearby brown bear has other ideas.
22	9	"The Octonauts and the Rainforest Rescue"	Min	2 May 2022
The entire crew is deployed to the rainforest when the area begins to suffer a severe drought, but the dry weather and a notoriously territorial troop of howler monkeys complicate the mission.
23	10	"The Octonauts and the Alligator-Shark Showdown"	Kwazii	2 May 2022
23	10	"The Octonauts and the Quest for Cocoa"	Tominnow	2 May 2022
Kwazii joins Paani on a research expedition in the Withlacoochee River, but when they find a group of stubborn alligators harassed by sharks in a ghost forest, Ranger Marsh is required to step in. The Vegimals set off for the Amazon rainforest when the Octopod runs out of hot chocolate. However, the cocoa trees have been suffering in the heat, and their attempts to give it shade are less than successful.
24	11	"The Octonauts and the Arabian Camels"	Dashi	2 May 2022
24	11	"The Octonauts and the Giant Carp"	Pearl	2 May 2022
While taking shelter from a sandstorm, Paani gets distracted by a mirage and ends up lost in the Arabian Desert. He must follow a group of camels for survival while the other Octonauts search for him. Pearl and Periwinkle encounter a wild and greedy grass carp in Lake Erie, and despite their best efforts, the group has trouble trying to catch the giant and hungry fish.
25	12	"The Octonauts and the Mountain Parrots"	Dashi	2 May 2022
25	12	"The Octonauts and the Mystery Island"	Pete	2 May 2022
While working with Paani to set up a weather station in New Zealand, the Octonauts run afoul of numerous keas, which becomes problematic when the birds accidentally sabotage the Octo-Ray. Kwazii and Calico Jack strand themselves on a mysterious island, and they must attempt to survive while Pete calls out for help.
26	13	"The Octonauts and the Monarch Butterflies"	Tweak	2 May 2022
26	13	"The Octonauts and the Sand Cat"	Calico Jack	2 May 2022
Dashi, Tweak, and Peso help a lone monarch butterfly rejoin his swarm, but a tornado threatens to derail the migration to Mexico. Kwazii is tasked with helping Calico Jack rebury his treasure, but when they end up in the desert, the duo find that a sand cat has snuck around their campsite and stolen the goods, hiding the treasure far better than they expected.

=== Season 3 (2023) ===
1. The Pininga Turtle

2. The Portuguese Man o' War

3. The Pink Fairy Armadillo

4. The Flooded Forest

5. The Twelve-Year Bloom

6. The Penguin Adventure

7. The Atmospheric River

8. The Red Tide

9. The Rival Ravens

10. The Orangutans

11. The Termite Mound

12. The Tsunami

13. The Very Salty Lake

14. The Mimics

15. The Snowshoe Hares

16. The Gila Monster

17. The Weaver Bird

18. The Malabar Giant Squirrel

19. The Spectral Tarsier

20. The Missing Shell

21. The Kauri Forest

22. The Sea Turtle's Shell

23. The Yellowstone Wolves

24. The Bald Ibises

25. The Kilimanjaro Climb

=== Season 4 (2024) ===
1. The Solar Storm

2. The Frigatebird

3. The Madagascar Tsingy

4. The Permafrost Problem

5. The Mudslide

6. The Honey Bees

7. The Boiling River

8. The Kalahari Copycat

9. The Ringed Seals

10. The Alpine Swift

11. The Elephant Swim Lesson

12. The Hazardous Habitats

13. The Iguazu Falls

14. The Arctic Blizzard

15. The Gobi Desert

16. The Caddisfly Silk

17. The Mudflat Mission

18. The Lost Bottlenose Dolphins

19. The Desert Creatures

20. The Hawaiian Monk Seal

21. The Great Pacific Clean-Up

22. The Volcano Sharks

23. The Billabong Mystery

24. The Spider Crab Surprise

25. The Mysterious Webs

=== Season 5 (2025) ===
1. The Wildebeest Migration

2. The Australian Wildfire

3. The Mangrove Mission

4. The Indian Rhinos

5. The Bar-headed Goose

6. Operation Inspiration

7. The Long-nosed Bats

8. The Snake-infested Sea foam

9. The Jellyfish Lake

10. The Micronesian Mystery

11. The Caribbean King Crabs

12. The Fig Fiasco

13. The Creature Coach Upgrade

14. The Strange Sickness

15. The Building Beavers

16. The Swimming Moose

17. The Nano-Chameleon

18. The Quokkas

19. The Spring Awakening

20. The Valley of Flowers

21. The Nubian Ibex

22. The Cuckoo

23. The Galápagos Tortoise

24. The Hippo Hydration

25. The African Forest Elephants

=== Season 6 (2026) ===
1. The Arctic Lightning

2. The Elegant Tern Return

3. The Prairie Dogs

4. The Bamboo Bonanza

5. The Sea Snot

6. The Sword-billed hummingbird

7. The Cassowary

8. The Nerpa Pup

9. The Fennec Fox

10. The Cicadas

11. The Red Crab Migration

12. The Aqua Caves

13. The Hoopoes

14. The Golden Snub-nosed Monkeys

15. The Scarlet Macaws

16. The Burrowing Tortoise

17. The Frozen Forest

18. Go Bananas

19. The Missing Octo-Mite

20. The Tilting Trees

21. The Pumpkin Toadlet

22. The River Otter

23. The Everlasting Storm

24. The Flying Spiders

== Release ==
Octonauts: Above & Beyond debuted on 7 September 2021, on Netflix. A trailer was released on 10 August 2021.

A second season was released 2 May 2022 on Netflix. The special double episode in this season is "Octonauts & the Rainforest Rescue", which focused on a rescuing a baby eagle. Fisher-Price released an Above & Beyond toy line to sell alongside the existing main series toys.

According to the producers at Silvergate Media, attempts are being made to have Above & Beyond return to public television airings in the USA.

Unlike the original that originally aired on Disney Junior in America, Above & Beyond does not air on that channel, due to Disney not purchasing the show with a US dub. The show premiered on television on CBeebies in 2023, respectively like the original series.

A fifth series premiered 29 May 2025 in China, with 24 episodes, with a sixth and final series releasing the same day the following year. It is unclear whether both will come to CBeebies yet.
