= Elena Saurel =

British-Swiss actress and filmmaker

- Born: 1987/1988
- Education: SOAS, University of London
- Years active: 2010–present

Elena Saurel is an actress and writer based in London. She is known for her roles in the ITV2 sitcom Buffering (2021–2023), and the BBC Two series Industry (2022–) and We Might Regret This (2024–).

== Early life ==
Saurel grew up in Geneva, Switzerland and moved to England at the age of 14, where she attended Bedales School. She is of Salvadoran-American heritage, and holds Spanish and American citizenship. Her parents enrolled her in afternoon acting classes to help with her anxiety and dyslexia. She took a one-year course at the Lee Strasberg Institute in New York before going on to graduate with a Bachelor of Arts in History and Archaeology from SOAS, University of London. During her time at university, she signed up for a number of short films and fringe plays.

== Career ==
Saurel portrayed Janis Joplin in Paul Desveaux's Pearl at the Abrons Arts Center in December 2015 and made her London stage debut in Labyrinth at the Hampstead Theatre in 2016. In 2018, Saurel had a recurring role as Stacey in the ITV comedy-drama Girlfriend. She also appeared in series such as Lovesick on Netflix, Living the Dream and Breeders on Sky One, Killing Eve on BBC America, and Gold Digger on BBC One.

The majority of her film roles have been in short films, two of which she also wrote: Eject (2019) and Behind the Mask (2021).

In 2021, Saurel began starring as Olivia in the ITV2 sitcom Buffering. In 2022, she joined the cast of the HBO and BBC investment banking drama Industry for its second season as Anna Gearing. In 2024, she appeared in the BBC comedy-drama We Might Regret This and has an upcoming role in the Amazon Freevee series Open Book.

== Personal life ==
Saurel is a supporter of the Cervantes Theatre in Southwark.

== Filmography ==
=== Film ===
Year	Title	Role	Notes
2010	Anaphylaxis	Morgue Woman	Uncredited role
2013	Allegra	Allegra	Short films
2013	A Party in London	Cassandra	Short films
2014	Popcorn	Brooke Daniels	Short films
2014	Due	Karen	Short films
2014	An Open Letter to Dominic	Ellis	Short films
2014	Toilets	Fee	Short films
2015	Charlie and Wendy	Wendy	
2015	Menagerie	May	Short films
2015	Fellow Travellers	Colin's Wife	Short films
2015	Anchor	Joni	Short films
2016	A Message from Tar Creek	Julia (voice)	Short films
2016	Witch	Alice	Short films
2017	The Last Lighthouse Keeper	Older Danny	Short films
2019	The Meeting	Elaine	Short films
2019	How We Met - Based on a True Story	Mary	Short films
2019	You Know Why - Based on a True Story	Elena	Short films
2019	I Want to Make You Happy	Laura	Video
2019	Eject	Kate	Short film. Also writer
2020	Eurovision Song Contest: The Story of Fire Saga	Stage Manager	
2021	Gloria	Gloria	Short film
2021	Behind the Mask	Actor 2 / Disguised Woman 1	Short film. Also writer
2022	The Batman	Detective on Phone	
2022	Tad, the Lost Explorer and the Emerald Tablet	Ramirez (voice)	English version
2023	Indiana Jones and the Dial of Destiny	Drunk Airline Stewardess	

=== Television ===
Year	Title	Role	Notes
2014	Benidorm	Spa Receptionist	Episode #6.6
2014	50 Ways to Kill Your Lover	Kristen Rossum	Episode #1.4
2015	Catastrophe	Blaire	Episode #1.1
2015	The Last Hours of Laura K	Sabrina Bahadir	Television film
2015	Not Safe for Work	Receptionist	Mini-series; Episode #1.5
2017	Silent Witness	Luisa Herreraz	2 episodes: "Awakening: Parts 1 & 2"
2017	Kiss of Death	Gina	Episode: "Blood Never Lies"
2017	Josh	Lauren	Episode: "The Old Lady & The Swan"
2018	Lovesick	Bianca	Episode: "Evie (Part Two)"
2018	Girlfriends	Stacey	3 episodes
2018	Midsomer Murders	Zennia Lounds	Episode: "Drawing Dead"
2019	Living the Dream	Connie	2 episodes: "Steak Out" and "Visa Tambien"
2019	Killing Eve	Woman at Train Station	Episode: "Do You Know How to Dispose of a Body?"
2019	Gold Digger	Bianca	Mini-series; 2 episodes: "Her Daughter" and "Her Love"
2019	Sticks and Stones	Tonya Baxter	Original title: The Man. Mini-series; Episode #1.2
2020	Kate & Koji	Rosa	Episode #1.5
2021	Breeders	Martina	2 episodes: "No Connection" and "No Friends"
2021	Around the World in 80 Days	Sally	Episode #1.7
2021–2023	Buffering	Olivia	Main role; 11 episodes
2022–present	Industry	Anna Gearing	Main role (season 2–)
2023	The B@it		Episode: "Urine Love"
2023	Octonauts: Above & Beyond	Selva (voice)	Episode: "The Octonauts and the Kilimanjaro Climb"
2024	The Mallorca Files	Reyna Alvarez	Episode: "All That Glisters"
2024–present	We Might Regret This	Jo	10 episodes
TBA	Open Book	Kat	Pre-production

=== Video games ===
Year	Title	Role	Notes
2014	Fatal Frame: Maiden of Black Water	Hisoka Kurosawa	
2014	The Crew		
2015	Victor Vran	Irene	English versions
2016	Star Ocean: Anamnesis	Anne	English versions
2017	Horizon Zero Dawn	Vala	
2017	Lego Marvel Super Heroes 2	America Chavez	
2018	Leisure Suit Larry: Wet Dreams Don't Dry	Diana	English version
2018	Hitman 2	Announcer	
2019	Control	Additional cast	
2019	Tom Clancy's Ghost Recon Breakpoint	Dr. Rosamund Fletcher / Deep State DLC	
2019	Tropico 6		
2022	Dragon Quest Treasures	Additional voices	English versions
2023	Atomic Heart		English versions

== Stage ==
Year	Title	Role	Notes
2015	Pearl	Janis Joplin	Abrons Arts Center, New York
2016	Labyrinth	Grace	Hampstead Theatre, London
2017	The House of Bernarda Alba	Marti	Cervantes Theatre / Southwark Playhouse, London
