= Buffering (TV series) =

Television series

- Genre: Sitcom
- Created by: Steve Bugeja; Iain Stirling
- Directed by: Martin Stirling
- Starring: Iain Stirling; Elena Saurel; Phil Fletcher; Jessie Cave
- Country of origin: United Kingdom
- Original language: English
- No. of series: 2
- No. of episodes: 12

Production
- Executive producers: Richard Allen-Turner; Jon Thoday
- Producers: Jane Bell; Serena Cullen

Original release
- Network: ITV2
- Release: 5 August 2021 – 6 March 2023

Buffering is a British sitcom broadcast on ITV2. The series was created and is co-written by comedian Iain Stirling and Steve Bugeja, and began airing on 5 August 2021 with all episodes available on the ITV Hub on the same day. After a year hiatus, a second series aired in January 2023, but after 12 episodes "Buffering" was axed.

== Cast ==
- Iain Stirling as Iain; A children's TV presenter.
- Elena Saurel as Olivia
- Jessie Cave as Rosie
- Janine Harouni as Thalia
- Rosa Robson as Ashley
- Paul G Raymond as Greg
- Sean Sagar as Robbie
- Steve Bugeja as Finn
- Phil Fletcher as Larry the Lizard

== Plot ==
"Buffering follows the lives of kids’ TV presenter Iain (Iain Stirling) and his housemates...as they attempt to navigate the choppy waters of their late twenties, with every wrong decision, failed relationship and wasted hungover day intensifying the feeling that time is running out for them to get their 'adult' lives in order."

== Episodes ==
=== Series 1 ===
No.	Title	Directed by	Written by	ITV2 air date	ITV Hub air date	UK viewers (millions) (Note: 28-day consolidated ratings with device viewership. From episode 3, figures include viewership on ITV Hub prior to linear broadcast.)
1	"Episode 1"	Martin Stirling	Iain Stirling & Steve Bugeja	5 August 2021	5 August 2021	3.57
2	"Episode 2"	Martin Stirling	Iain Stirling & Steve Bugeja	5 August 2021	5 August 2021	4.02
3	"Episode 3"	Martin Stirling	Iain Stirling & Steve Bugeja	12 August 2021	5 August 2021	2.89
4	"Episode 4"	Martin Stirling	Iain Stirling, Steve Bugeja & Eleanor Tiernan	19 August 2021	5 August 2021	3.35
5	"Episode 5"	Martin Stirling	Iain Stirling, Steve Bugeja & Eleanor Tiernan	26 August 2021	5 August 2021	1.51
6	"Episode 6"	Martin Stirling	Iain Stirling, Steve Bugeja & Christine Robertson	2 September 2021	5 August 2021	2.30

=== Series 2 ===
No.	Title	Directed by	Written by	ITV2 air date	ITV Hub air date	UK viewers (millions) (Note: 28-day consolidated ratings with device viewership. From episode 3, figures include viewership on ITV Hub prior to linear broadcast.)
1	"Episode 1"	Sophie King	Iain Stirling, Steve Bugeja & Christine Robertson	30 January 2023	30 January 2023	3.89
2	"Episode 2"	Sophie King	Iain Stirling, Steve Bugeja & Janine Harouni	6 February 2023	30 January 2023	3.04
3	"Episode 3"	Sophie King	Iain Stirling, Steve Bugeja & Jessie Cave	13 February 2023	30 January 2023	3.39
4	"Episode 4"	Sophie King	Iain Stirling, Steve Bugeja & Sally O'Leary	20 February 2023	30 January 2023	4.26
5	"Episode 5"	Sophie King	Iain Stirling, Steve Bugeja & Sally O'Leary	27 February 2023	30 January 2023	2.10
6	"Episode 6"	Sophie King	Iain Stirling, Steve Bugeja & Christine Robertson	6 March 2023	30 January 2023	1.78
