= Bait (TV series) =

British limited television series

- Promotional poster
- Genre: Comedy-drama
- Created by: Riz Ahmed
- Directed by: Bassam Tariq; Tom George
- Starring: Riz Ahmed; Guz Khan; Aasiya Shah; Sheeba Chaddha; Sajid Hasan; Ritu Arya; Weruche Opia
- Music by: Shruti Kumar
- Countries of origin: United Kingdom; United States
- Original language: English
- No. of series: 1
- No. of episodes: 6

Production
- Executive producers: Riz Ahmed; Allie Moore; Ben Karlin; Jake Fuller
- Producers: Chris Sheriff; Karen Joseph Adcock; Dipika Guha; Prashanth Venkataramanujam; Azam Mahmood
- Cinematography: Frank Lamm
- Editors: Ant Boys; Gary Dollner
- Camera setup: Multi-camera
- Running time: 23–27 minutes
- Production companies: Jax Media; Left Handed Films; Amazon MGM Studios

Original release
- Network: Amazon Prime Video
- Release: 25 March 2026

Bait is a 2026 comedy-drama television series created by Riz Ahmed. It was developed at Jax Media in association with Left Handed Films for Amazon MGM Studios. The series stars Ahmed, Guz Khan, Ritu Arya, and Sheeba Chaddha. It had its world premiere at the 2026 Sundance Film Festival, and was released on 25 March 2026 on Amazon Prime Video. The drama follows a British Pakistani actor as he auditions for the role of James Bond amid public backlash and family relationships.

The series has been described as blend of industry satire, dark comedy, semi-autobiography, and family psychodrama. It received critical acclaim from critics, with praise for the performances and writing.

== Premise ==
After Shah Latif, a struggling actor from a west London Pakistani Muslim family, auditions for the role of James Bond, he must navigate public backlash and family relationships while suffering an existential crisis. The series sardonically examines his life over four days through the intersection of fame, publicity, and the British Asian immigrant experience as viewed through Shah's interpersonal relationships.

== Cast ==
- Riz Ahmed as Shah Latif
  - Muhammad Abdur-Rahman Toheed plays a 12 year old Shah in flashbacks.
- Guz Khan as Zulfikar "Zulfi", Shah's entrepreneurial cousin and friend
  - Ashwin Chandrasekaran plays a 13 year Zulfi in flashbacks.
- Aasiya Shah as Q, Shah's cousin.
- Sheeba Chaddha as Tahira Latif, Shah's mother; Q and Zulfi's aunt
- Sajid Hasan as Parvez Latif, Shah's father; Q and Zulfi's uncle
- Ritu Arya as Yasmin Khan, Shah's ex-girlfriend
- Weruche Opia as Felicia, Shah's agent and friend
- Nabhaan Rizwan as Salim, a family friend of the Latifs
- Maxine Peake as Helen, the director of the new Bond film
- Rafe Spall as Nigel, a security consultant
- Soni Razdan as Naila, a family friend of the Latifs
- Himesh Patel as Raj Thakkar, a rival actor auditioning for the Bond role
- Sian Clifford as Vivian, the director of the King's Museum
- Patrick Stewart as the voice of "Pigtrick", a severed pig's head who verbalises Shah's self-doubt
- Gina Bramhill as the actress playing "Severine", a role in the Bond film
- Gassan Abdulrazek as Sid, a young activist that Shah unwittingly assaults

== Production ==
=== Development ===
The idea for Bait was conceived when Ahmed was told by a friend, "the distance between your public and private self is the amount of shame you carry" and he realised that "either I need to get therapy or I need to make a TV show about it." Ahmed has stated that he has been thinking about the show since the mid-2010s, and that it was inspired in part by several specific incidents he experienced during his rise to fame. Scenes that Ahmed said were inspired by personal experiences included Shah's panic attack at a music venue, the racially-motivated beating he received in his childhood, and attempted recruitment by MI5.

However, Ahmed has downplayed the similarities of Shah Latif's character and himself, saying that while some scenes in the show are based on incidents he experienced, Bait is not autofiction. He stated that while Shah views Bond as a symbol of success, acceptance, "cinematic achievement, [and] alpha masculinity", Shah's pursuit of the role "is actually about wishing he was someone else".

The series was developed at Jax Media in association with Left Handed Films for Amazon MGM Studios and their streaming platform Amazon Prime Video. It is executive produced by Ahmed and Allie Moore for Left Handed, and Jake Fuller on behalf of Jax Media. Ben Karlin is an executive producer, writer and is showrunning with Ahmed. The series writers include Dipika Guha, Prashanth Venkataramanujam, Karen Joseph Adcock and Azam Mahmood. Roopesh Parekh is also an executive producer. Nikesh Shukla, editor of the 2016 essay collection The Good Immigrant which Ahmed contributed to, is a consulting producer. The credits also thank Jesse Armstrong and Chris Morris, who had previously worked with Ahmed on the 2010 satirical black comedy Four Lions.

While reviewers have noted that the premise of Bait is "itself kind of bait", Ahmed says that the show is not really about James Bond, nor is it completely about the conversation regarding whether a non-white character should play the role, and emphasises that the use of Bond as a framing element "brings in a spy thriller aspect to the show—it allows drama and action and suspense to live alongside the comedy".

After Ahmed began writing the script, he met Barbara Broccoli, the producer who held creative control of the James Bond film franchise, to request her consent regarding use of the Bond name. She granted her permission with the sole request that she not be referenced in the series. He explained that the show was not really about Bond but about self-love, "about trying to be something you’re not...And really what it’s about—taking it away from questions of identity—is how life feels like one big audition."

=== Casting ===
Guz Khan, Sheeba Chaddha, Aasiya Shah, Ritu Arya, Weruche Opia and Sajid Hasan joined the cast in August 2024.

Ahmed wrote Pigtrick with Patrick Stewart in mind and sent him a letter asking him to play the role. Stewart accepted and reportedly stated that "he'd never read anything quite like this." Due to his death in October of 2026, Patrick playing Pigtrick was his last television role.

=== Filming ===
Principal photography took place in London during September 2024 under the working title Quarter Life. Filming locations included Wembley, the Central Mosque of Brent, and the O2 Forum Kentish Town.

== Episodes ==
No.	Title	Directed by	Written by	Original release date
1	"Blatant, Not Subtle"	Bassam Tariq	Riz Ahmed	March 25, 2026
Shah Latif auditions for the role of James Bond, however he forgets his lines during the screen test and is reprimanded by Helen, the film's director who had put her hopes in him. He is dismissed from the audition, and deliberately leaves the studio via the front door so that he is photographed by paparazzi as a contender for the role. His friend and cousin Zulfi, an Uber driver, takes him to Shah’s family home to visit his parents despite Shah’s reluctance. The news about his audition and potential role as Bond trends on social media, and his friends and family are excited for him. He goes to a music event organised by his rapper friends and runs into his ex-girlfriend Yasmin. After reading online backlash regarding the news, he has a panic attack outside the music venue. A vandal throws a severed pig’s head through his Muslim parents' window with a hateful note attached to it. Shah receives a text from his agent that he has another chance at the audition.
2	"To Troll, to Provoke"	Bassam Tariq	Prashanth Venkataramanujam	March 25, 2026
The episode opens with Shah being interviewed by what seems like Patrick Stewart, but is in fact the pig’s head which Shah has stored in his basement freezer, nicknamed Pigtrick. He meets with security consultant Nigel in order to secure his house for Eid al-Fitr. Nigel suggests that the celebrations be held at another location. To Shah’s mother Tahira’s dismay, family friend Naila’s house is chosen. Shah attends a museum gala with Zulfi as his "security". Activists outside protest for the repatriation of cultural property, and Shah declines a photo request from a young activist named Sid, leading to Sid calling him a sellout. At the gala, Zulfi promotes his rideshare company while Shah attempts to find a way to speak to the gala guests to increase his chances of getting the Bond role. Museum director Vivian declines his request as Raj Thakkar, a rival actor, is already slated to give a speech. Shah finds Thakkar and tells him about the pig's head, convincing him to let Shah speak. During Thakkar's speech, he recounts Shah's pig's head incident as his own, eliciting the audience's sympathy. Zulfi is escorted out by museum security for "racially profiling" guests, but Shah does not intervene. When it is his turn to speak on stage, a man (whom Shah first perceives as white) runs into the gala, and Shah stops him by reflexively flipping him and breaking his arm. The man is revealed to be Sid. Throughout the episode, Pigtrick mocks and accuses Shah of being unable to embody Bond due to his cowardice, and there are flashbacks to Shah's experience of being attacked by white peers as a child. He speaks to Pigtrick after the gala, but lies to Q that he is practicing lines when she asks what he is doing.
3	"House or Home"	Bassam Tariq	Azam Mahmood	March 25, 2026
Shah meets with his agent Felicia, who assures him that the incident can be resolved by posting an apology video to Sid. He also learns of a news article where Yasmin critiques his audition for Bond, saying that Shah is exchanging political art for approval of the white establishment. Throughout the Eid al-Fitr celebrations, Shah navigates his worsening relationship with Zulfi, his attempts to sooth Tahira’s jealousy of Naila, and his own jealousy of Naila’s successful son Salim. Naila talks to Tahira about Shah, noting the high societal pressure and that he reminds her of Tahira's sister, Ruqaya, who is implied to have mental health issues. Despite Naila's assurance that it is fine to talk about these topics now, Tahira brushes off her concern. Shah learns that Q and Salim are romantically involved and promises not to tell anyone. After multiple failed attempts at a sincere apology video, Shah calls Sid directly. While his apology is accepted, Sid requests an apology video to increase his follower count. Shah breaks his phone in frustration. During salah, his father faints, and Zulfi blames Shah for giving him sweets while knowing he is a diabetic. Shah’s frustrations come to a head and he lashes out at his family, accusing them of judging him. He reveals that Q and Salim are together, calls Zulfi a ‘Paki’, and says that Tahira blames him for what happened to Zulfi’s mother Ruqaya. Tahira slaps Shah, and he leaves the gathering in anger and regret.
4	"Loyalty, Allegiance"	Tom George	Dipika Guha	March 25, 2026
Shah finds his ex-girlfriend Yasmin in a Brick Lane restaurant that she goes to every Eid al-Fitr and confronts her over her column. Their argument escalates and Yasmin leaves the restaurant while Shah pursues her. Yasmin realises her bag containing her passport has been taken, and they take a rickshaw ride to track the bag through her AirPods which lead them to a blacklight dance club. During the journey, they reconnect with each other. Shah continues to see hallucinations of Pigtrick, and when he goes to the bathroom to calm himself, he finds her bag. He lies to Yasmin, who realises the truth immediately and demands the bag from him. He confronts her about the multiple passports, and Yasmin tells him she is planning to leave for Argentina with her new boyfriend. She admits that she has reservations, and Shah tries to express himself while using the lines from his script. Yasmin calls him insane and they hug. Shah asks her not to go. Yasmin tells him to take care and leaves.
5	"Lure, Part of a Trap"	Tom George	Karen Joseph Adcock	March 25, 2026
Shah returns home in the early morning and finds his house empty with blood on the carpet and Pigtrick on the sofa. He puts Pigtrick in a bag and goes to the police station to file a missing persons report for his family. Frustrated with the detectives’ ambivalence, he leaves the station and seeks out Nigel’s help. However, he is disillusioned with Nigel’s request for him to advocate for Nigel’s security company in return for his services. Throughout his journey, Shah hallucinates conversations between himself and Pigtrick. Shah seeks out a mosque for help in finding Zulfi, but leaves after worshippers panic upon finding the pig’s head that Shah had left at the mosque entrance, taking Pigtrick with him. Shah hallucinates his critics confronting him, who are then killed by a version of himself as Bond, who then pursues Shah himself. During the pursuit, Shah is hit by a car and begins monologuing to the mangled remains of Pigtrick.
6	"The Subtle One"	Tom George	Ben Karlin	March 25, 2026
The episode begins with Q, Tahira and Parvez in the Latif home after the events of Episode 3. Q finds Pigtrick and confronts Tahira and Parvez about ignoring Shah’s mental issues, and Parvez faints. An injured Shah awakens in a car driven by Felicia, who assures him that despite the previous events, the audition is still on. However, she takes him to his home first as she wants him to resolve his family issues. Shah arrives to find Q, Zulfi, Tahira and Parvez held captive around the dinner table. At gunpoint, Felicia tells him the reasons that he is creatively blocked is because he is fixated on their approval, and that in order to succeed in his audition, he must eliminate them. Shah resists, before he takes the gun and shoots them, killing his mother last. He wakes in a hospital after his car accident, and finds Parvez, Tahira, and Q in the neighbouring ward. Q tells him that Zulfi is flying to Dubai with Salim, and they rush to the airport. They find Salim and Zulfi before they pass the security gate, and Shah reconciles with Zulfi while Q reconciles with Salim. Q tells Shah that he still has time to make it to the audition. On the train there, he sees his younger self sitting opposite him. Shah nails his audition and is congratulated by the director on getting the role of James Bond. In the final scene, Shah is prompted to say Bond’s name in the iconic introductory line. (Note: "The name’s Bond, James Bond.") Shah thinks of his family and says “The name’s …Shahjehan” instead.

== Music ==
Bait features a score by Shruti Kumar and a soundtrack containing a mix of orchestral music, psychedelic 1970s Pakistani film music, and songs from British and South Asian artists. The music also draws from Qawwali, '80s synth pop, U.K. drum and bass, and Bhangra. Bait (Music from the Original Series) was released on 25 March 2026, with an extended edition of the soundtrack set for release on 16 April. It includes "Price of It All" by Jorja Smith, an Urdu cover of "Sweet Dreams (Are Made of This)" by Anish Kumar featuring Arooj Aftab, and "Pulling Me Back" by Jay Sean featuring Véyah, along with a track by Casisdead. Soundtrack also features music from a famous Tamil song “Aasaya Kaathula” composed by Ilayaraja from the 1980 movie Johnny and “Darling Darling I love you” from the 1978 Tamil movie Priya.

== Title ==
In British slang, the meaning of "bait" means to be blatant, "in your face", and attention seeking, and it can also mean online trolling. "Bayt" and "bayit/beit" means "home" in Arabic and Hebrew, and "loyalty" or "allegiance" in Urdu. In its literal meaning, bait is a component of a trap, alluding to the spy thriller aspect of the series.

In The Guardian, Jones notes the double meaning of the series title, that Shah is "afraid of becoming “bait”, both in the London slang sense of “obvious”, “naff”, a “sell-out”, and also in the closer-to-OED sense of a lure, used – in this case – by the British state to co-opt legitimate dissent".

== Release ==
The series had its world premiere at the 2026 Sundance Film Festival under the title Bait. Bait was released exclusively on Amazon Prime Video on 25 March 2026.

== Reception ==
On the review aggregator website Rotten Tomatoes, 94% of 49 critics' reviews are positive, with an average rating of 8.0/10. The website's consensus reads: "Riz Ahmed creates and stars in this compassionate, humor-filled meta-satire that dazzlingly lures in its audience like delicious BAIT." On Metacritic, it has a weighted average score of 85 out of 100 based on 18 critics, indicating "universal acclaim".

Metacritic review
breakdown (unweighted)

Positive
17 (94%)
Mixed
1 (6%)
Negative
0 (0%)

Reviews for Bait in the Collider, The Cut, The Telegraph and Men's Journal were overwhelmingly positive. Jack King's review on GQ described Bait as "a darkly funny, sometimes sad, whip-smart urban odyssey that asks questions of cultural identity, assimilation, identity politics, masculinity, class, and all of the intersections therein." King additionally noted that "much of the brilliance of Bait lies in its richly-written specificity", as well as Shah's "complex inner turmoil, which manifests in ways both devastatingly blunt and thrillingly abstract". The Los Angeles Times was similarly effusive in its praise, highlighting how the series " plays with the language of film — gritty procedural, a burst of Bollywood, romantic comedy — though not necessarily to the usual ends. Frame-filling titles identify the London neighborhoods where the action takes place — Wembley, Kentish Town, Brick Lane, Ladbroke Grove — as Paris, Moscow and Mexico City might appear in an international thriller."

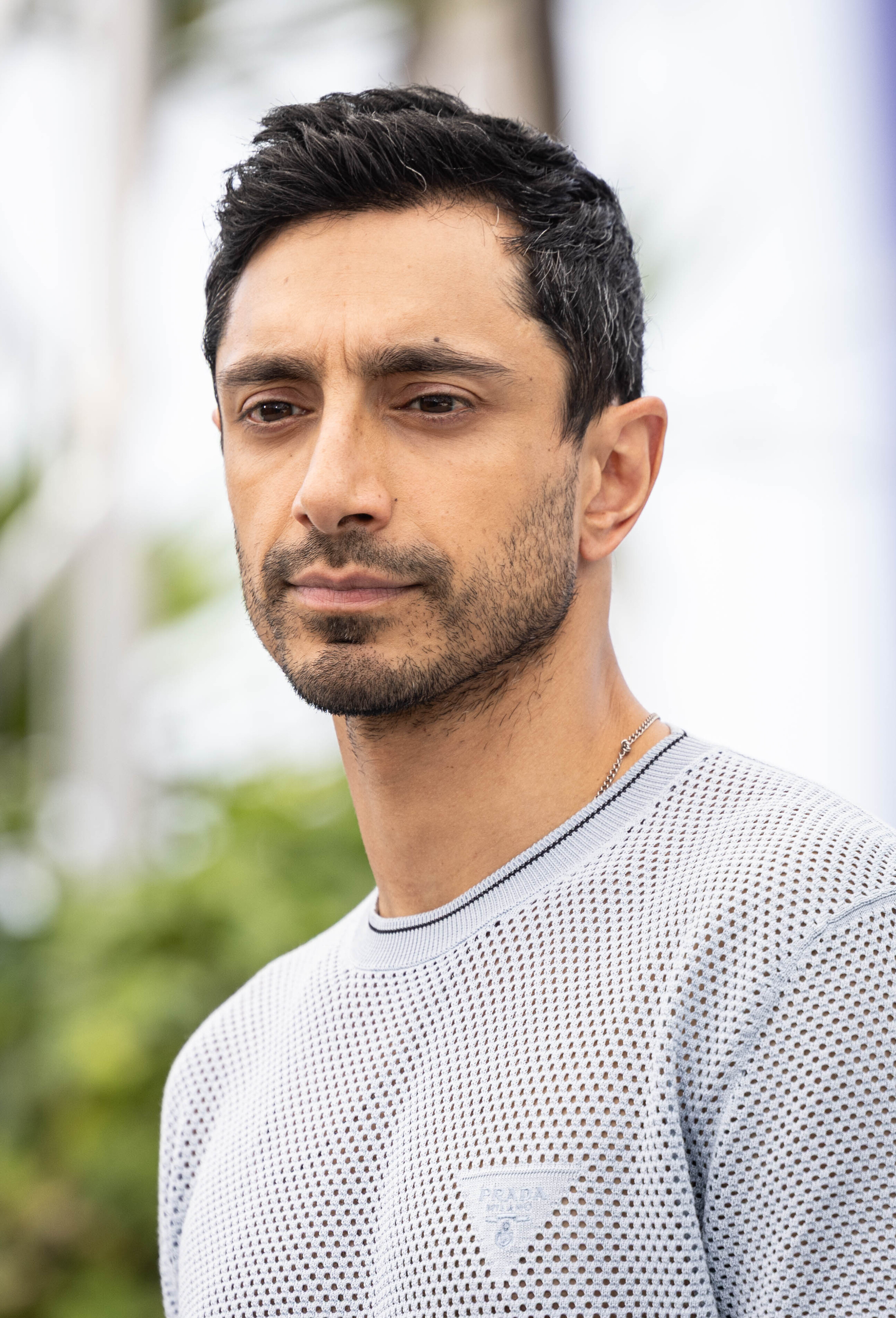
Riz Ahmed received critical acclaim for his performance, and received an Emmy nomination for Outstanding Lead Actor in a Limited or Anthology Series or Movie.

In The Guardian, Ellen E. Jones described the series as "part semi-autobiographical sitcom...part surrealist industry satire" and praised the humour and dialogue as " a dazzling display of second-gen immigrant linguistic dexterity, which slips between Urdu, Arabic, MLE (Multicultural London English) and RP". Jones also praised the casting and performance, concluding that the series was best when "Ahmed-the-writer is exposing his most petty, narcissistic and self-absorbed instincts" with a note that some scenes felt overly self-congratulatory.

In a review for The A.V. Club, Saloni Gajjar praised the show for offering "an incisive, wry analysis of the treatment of Brown actors, the value of being seen on the screen, and, crucially, the burden of carrying that torch of representation", calling it a counterpart to We Are Lady Parts. He wrote: "The show offers a stylishly filmed, bleakly funny journey into [Shah's] psyche, with Ahmed giving a profoundly open, committed, and comedic performance." The RogerEbert.com review was similarly positive, describing the show as "an engaging mix of “Uncut Gems” and “Fleabag”".

Mike Hale from The New York Times praised the casting but was more critical of the series, stating the script did not make the audience care about Shah or his redemption, and called the use of the severed pig's head "an objectively bad idea". While the Radio Times noted that it was a surreal and outlandish choice that could divide some viewers, it also labelled it a bold move that was demonstrative of the show's reluctance to take itself too seriously.

While some reviewers praised the "snappy" conciseness of the series' 30-minute episodes, Variety reviewer Alison Herman was more critical, writing "with less than three hours of screen time, the show doesn’t have time to deepen [Shah] beyond the capital-i Issues his plight is meant to represent". Herman also found Shah's character to be "more textbook than informative" and his family's characterisations were "drawn in equally broad strokes", commenting that the family's most intriguing shared trauma, the loss of Q and Zulfi's mother, was not explored, and she concluded that the series "[poked] at the Bond legend while ultimately, respectfully propping it up."

The Hollywood Reporter also noted that six half-hour episodes were likely not enough to explore the topics presented in the series, "especially when it becomes clear that the Latifs have a family history of mental illness that dovetails uncomfortably with Shah’s newfound determination to believe that the implausible might be possible". In the review, Fienberg wrote: "Some of the psychological complexities are audacious, and I kept wondering how much the show would follow through with certain decisions, with the answer always being “very little.” It says the things it wants to say, but says them quickly, especially in a finale that ties several thematic elements together a little too neatly."

Writing for IndieWire, Ben Travers echoed the criticism of the show's length, writing: "Bait should either be a movie that’s 30 minutes shorter or a proper series with eight episodes in the first season and a proper set-up for the second. As is, it’s satisfying, slick, and thinner than it could be." He graded the show as a B−, concluding that while well-made and visually distinct, the show was formulaic in its narrative.

For the Financial Times, reviewer Rebecca Nicholson writes: "There is no hiding Ahmed’s intellectual streak. The comedic anarchy is tempered by a thoughtful, contemplative angst about culture, who owns it and who gets to be part of it. As a result, episodes follow a similar pattern of chaos followed by a handbrake turn into a moment of deep seriousness. Yet the chaos is more engaging than the sincerity, and eventually the backdrop of the entertainment industry starts to feel a little myopic. Bait’s half-hour episodes are bursting with ideas, but there isn’t quite enough room for all of them to blossom. This makes for a skittish, uneven series, but it remains a fresh, intriguing and auspicious start."

=== Awards and nominations ===
Year	Award	Category	Nominee	Result	Ref.
2026	Astra TV Awards	Best Actor in a Limited Series or TV Movie	Riz Ahmed	Nominated	
2026	Astra TV Awards	Best Writing in a Limited Series or TV Movie	Azam Mahmood (for "House or Home")	Won	
2026	Gotham TV Awards	Outstanding Lead Performance in a Limited or Anthology Series	Riz Ahmed	Nominated	
2026	Primetime Emmy Awards	Outstanding Lead Actor in a Limited or Anthology Series or Movie	Riz Ahmed	Nominated	
