= We Might Regret This =

British Television series

- Genre: Comedy drama
- Created by: Kyla Harris; Lee Getty
- Written by: Kyla Harris; Lee Getty
- Directed by: Nick Collett
- Starring: Kyla Harris; Darren Boyd; Elena Saurel; Edward Bluemel; Sally Phillips; Aasiya Shah
- Theme music composer: Andrew Yee
- Countries of origin: United Kingdom; United States
- Original language: English
- No. of series: 2
- No. of episodes: 10

Production
- Executive producers: Ash Atalla; Alex Smith; Rebecca Murrell
- Producer: Inez Gordon
- Cinematography: Will Hanke
- Editor: Hettie Griffiths
- Production companies: Roughcut Television; Village Roadshow Television

Original release
- Network: BBC Two
- Release: 19 August 2024 – present

We Might Regret This is a British comedy drama television series created by and starring Kyla Harris about a thirty-something Canadian tetraplegic woman who moves to London. It premiered on 19 August 2024 on BBC Two. The second series began production in June 2025, and was released on 25 February 2026.

== Premise ==
Freya is a Canadian tetraplegic woman in her thirties when she moves to London to live with Abe. She requires constant personal assistance to provide her care, but after not being able to find an appropriate personal assistant, invites her best friend Jo to take the job.

== Cast and characters ==
- Kyla Harris as Freya
- Darren Boyd as Abe
- Elena Saurel as Jo
- Edward Bluemel as Levi
- Sally Phillips as Jane
- Aasiya Shah as Ty
- Emma Sidi as Olivia
- Hanako Footman as Olyvya
- Jessie Mei Li as Haruka

== Production ==
We Might Regret This was initially reported in November 2022 to be in development as a Channel 4 pilot. The series was greenlit by the BBC in June 2023 to be a joint British and American production between Village Roadshow and Roughcut. The director is Nick Collett. It is produced by Inez Gordon and executive produced by Ash Atalla, Alex Smith and Rebecca Murrell. The story is inspired by the lived experience of co-writers Harris and Getty. Executive producer Atalla, a wheelchair user himself, has spoken of his wish to produce a high-end quality show on the subject matter. Filming got underway in October 2023.

In October 2024, We Might Regret This was renewed for two more six-part series. Production on the second series commenced in June 2025.

== Broadcast ==
The series was broadcast in the UK on BBC Two on 19 August 2024.

== Reception ==
In December 2024, the series was included in the best of the year list by Emily Baker in the i (newspaper) who described it as "genuinely groundbreaking in its approach to disability, not shying away from the difficulties of being a wheelchair user but also not reducing a person to just their disability. Most importantly, though, it was very, very funny".
