= Believe Me (TV series) =

British television series

- Genre: Crime drama
- Written by: Jeff Pope
- Directed by: Julia Ford
- Starring: Aimee-Ffion Edwards; Jordan Bolger; Laurie Kynaston; Daniel Mays; Miriam Petche; Aasiya Shah; David Fynn; Owain Arthur; Philippa Dunne; Alexa Davies; Rachael Stirling
- Country of origin: United Kingdom
- Original language: English
- No. of series: 1
- No. of episodes: 4

Production
- Executive producers: Saurabh Kakkar; Jeff Pope
- Producer: Catrin Lewis Defis
- Production companies: Etta Pictures; ITV Studios

Original release
- Network: ITVX
- Release: 10 May – 18 May 2026

Believe Me is a 2026 British four-part true-crime television series for ITVX written by Jeff Pope, starring Aimee-Ffion Edwards, Miriam Petche and Aasiya Shah, with Daniel Mays as John Worboys.

== Premise ==
Victims of London taxi driver and sex attacker John Worboys fight for justice.

== Cast ==
- Aimee-Ffion Edwards as Sarah Adams
- Miriam Petche as Carrie Symonds
- Aasiya Shah as Laila Mahmood
- Daniel Mays as John Worboys
- Laurie Kynaston as Frankie Peacock
- Philippa Dunne as Harriet Wistrich
- Rachael Stirling as Phillippa Kaufmann QC
- Jordan Bolger as Connor O'Carroll

== Production ==
The series was announced in August 2025, to be written by Jeff Pope. Pope is also an executive producer alongside Saurabh Kakkar on behalf of Etta Pictures with ITV Studios. Julia Ford directed the series, with Catrin Lewis Defis as producer.

The cast is led by Aimee-Ffion Edwards, Miriam Petche, Aasiya Shah and Daniel Mays.

Filming used Newport, Gwent, Wales, as a location depicting London. Filming took place in Port Talbot in September 2025.

== Broadcast ==
The series was broadcast on ITV and on ITVX from 10 May 2026. It aired on ABC Television and ABC iview from 19 July 2026 in Australia.

== Reception ==
The series has a score of 100% based on 9 reviews on the review aggregator website Rotten Tomatoes.

Lucy Mangan in The Guardian described the series as "a compelling as well as nonexploitative drama that others would do well to learn from" and praised Pope's "punchy, intelligent script".

Barbara Ellen wrote in The Observer that the series is "a rare thing: true crime drama that puts women first".

Kylie Northover of The Age, giving the series 4 out of 5 stars, wrote "the storytelling is taut, smartly written and superbly acted".

The series was nominated in the New Drama category at the 31st National Television Awards.
