= Industry (TV series) =

British television drama series

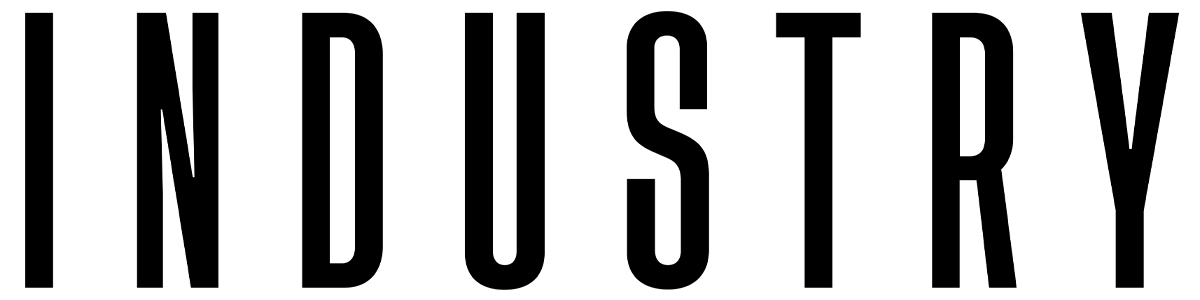
- Genre: Drama; Financial thriller; Erotic thriller
- Created by: Mickey Down; Konrad Kay
- Starring: see Main cast
- Music by: Nathan Micay
- Countries of origin: United Kingdom; United States
- Original language: English
- No. of seasons: 4
- No. of episodes: 32

Production
- Executive producers: Jane Tranter; Lachlan MacKinnon; David P. Davis; Ryan Rasmussen; Mickey Down; Konrad Kay; Joel Collins; Jami O'Brien; Kate Crowther; Kathleen McCaffrey
- Producers: Lee Thomas; Edoardo Ferretti; Dan Kay; Stephen Haren; Flynn MacDonell
- Cinematography: Daniel Stafford-Clark; Milos Moore; Catherine Derry; Erik Molberg Hansen; Federico Cesca; Martin V. Rush; Fede Cesca; Michael Paleodimos; Arthur Mulhern; Adam Lyons
- Editors: Maya Maffioli; Sam Williams; Dan Robinson; Christopher Watson; Mary Finlay; Peter Christelis; Sarah Louise Bates; Richard Ketteridge; Carly Brown; Kyle Ogden; Kyle Traynor; Chris Hunter; Richard Smither; Ben Mudge; Simon Smith
- Running time: 49–71 minutes
- Production company: Bad Wolf

Original release
- Network: BBC (UK); HBO (US)
- Release: 9 November 2020 – present

Opening title card for Industry

Industry is a financial thriller drama television series created by former investment bankers Mickey Down and Konrad Kay, and co-produced by BBC Two in the United Kingdom and HBO in the United States. The show follows the personal and professional lives of a group of young graduates who join Pierpoint & Co, a prestigious investment bank in London; later series expand the scope of the narrative to encompass the wider UK financial sector and its governing bodies. It features an ensemble cast led by Myha'la, Marisa Abela and Ken Leung. Additional leading roles are played by Harry Lawtey and David Jonsson in earlier series and Sagar Radia and Kit Harington in later installments.

Industry premiered on 9 November 2020 on HBO in the United States, and on the next day on BBC Two in the United Kingdom. Three further eight-episode series have been released in 2022, 2024, and 2026. It has been renewed for a fifth and final series. Industry has been praised throughout its run for its writing, performances, direction, and its accurate portrayal of the banking sector, with the third and fourth series in particular receiving widespread acclaim.

== Cast and characters ==
- Marisa Abela as Yasmin Kara-Hanani, an ambitious graduate from a wealthy background, initially assigned to the Foreign Exchange Sales (FX) desk at Pierpoint
- Priyanga Burford as Sara Dhadwal (series 1), the President of Pierpoint London
- Mark Dexter as Hilary Wyndham (series 1–2, 4), managing director (MD) of FX at Pierpoint
- Myha'la (Note: Credited as Myha'la Herrold in series 1–2) as Harper Stern, an underestimated, intelligent, and talented young woman from Binghamton, New York, initially assigned to the Cross Product Sales (CPS) desk at Pierpoint
- David Jonsson as Augustus "Gus" Sackey (series 1–2), an openly gay graduate of literae humaniores at Eton and Oxford, initially assigned to the Investment Banking Division (IBD) desk at Pierpoint, then the CPS desk
- Harry Lawtey as Robert Spearing (series 1–3), a graduate of Oxford from a working-class Welsh background, assigned to the CPS desk at Pierpoint
- Ben Lloyd-Hughes as Greg Grayson (series 1 and 3), (Note: Ben Lloyd-Hughes only appears in "Infinite Largesse" in series 3, although credited amongst the main cast.) a Vice President (VP) at the CPS desk
- Conor MacNeill as Kenny Kilbane, a VP at the FX desk at Pierpoint and Yasmin's line manager
- Freya Mavor as Daria Greenock (series 1; guest series 2–3), a VP at the CPS desk at Pierpoint and Harper's line manager
- Derek Riddell as Clement Cowan (series 1), CPS VP and Robert's manager, who struggles with heroin addiction
- Nabhaan Rizwan as Hari Dhar (series 1), (Note: Nabheen Rizwan only appears in "Induction" in series 1, although credited amongst the main cast.) a graduate of a state school from an Hindi-speaking immigrant family, assigned to the IBD desk at Pierpoint
- Will Tudor as Theo Tuck (series 1), a closeted Eton graduate and second-year research analyst for Pierpoint
- Ken Leung as Eric Tao, the fiery CPS MD at Pierpoint who takes Harper under his wing
- Sarah Parish as Nicole Craig (series 1–3), a Pierpoint client who is sexually inappropriate with Harper and Robert
- Andrew Buchan as Felim Bichan (series 1–2), a fund manager and Pierpoint's biggest client
- Amir El-Masry as Usman Abboud (series 1), assistant to Kaspar Zenden, Clement's main client
- Sagar Radia as Rishi Ramdani (series 2–present; recurring series 1), an associate and market maker on the CPS desk, known for his colorful commentary on the trading floor
- Caoilfhionn Dunne as Jackie Walsh (series 2; recurring series 1; guest series 3), a VP on the FX desk
- Nicholas Bishop as Maxim Alonso (series 2–3; (Note: Nicholas Bishop only appears in "Useful Idiot" in series 3, although credited amongst the main cast.) recurring series 1), Yasmin's family friend and one of Pierpoint's potential clients
- Alex Alomar Akpobome as Daniel Van Deventer, aka "DVD" (series 2), the executive director from Pierpoint New York who becomes involved with Harper
- Katrine De Candole as Celeste Pacquet (series 2), one of Pierpoint's Private Wealth Managers who begins an affair with Yasmin
- Indy Lewis as Venetia Berens (series 2–3; guest series 1), Yasmin's newest recruit on the FX desk
- Trevor White as Bill Adler (series 2–3; guest series 1), the global head of fixed income instruments, currencies, and commodities (FICC) at Pierpoint, based out of their New York headquarters
- Jay Duplass as Jesse Bloom (series 2), Harper's primary client, a hedge fund manager who capitalized greatly off the pandemic
- Adam Levy as Charles Hanani (series 2–4), Yasmin's father
- Sonny Poon Tip as Leo Bloom (series 2), Jesse's son who becomes involved with Gus
- Faith Alabi as Aurore Adekunle (series 2–3), a Tory MP and member of the Health and Social Care Select Committee
- Elena Saurel as Anna Gearing (series 2; recurring series 3), the head of FutureDawn Partners and Harper's new boss
- Irfan Shamji as Anraj Chabra (series 3; recurring series 2, guest series 4), graduate trader on the CPS desk
- Kit Harington as Sir Henry Muck (series 3–present), CEO of green-energy startup Lumi, and a spoiled aristocrat who struggles with depression and addiction
- Sarah Goldberg as Petra Koenig (series 3), a portfolio manager at FutureDawn who begins working with Harper
- Miriam Petche as Sweetpea Golightly (series 3–present), a new hire at Pierpoint with TikTok and OnlyFans businesses on the side
- Andrew Havill as Viscount Alexander Norton (series 3–present), Henry's uncle and a powerful newspaper proprietor
- Roger Barclay as Otto Mostyn (series 3–present), Henry's godfather and a ruthless asset manager
- Fiona Button as Denise Oldroyd (series 3), Yasmin's lawyer and Seb's sister
- Eliot Salt as Caedi McFarlane (series 3), Henry's executive assistant at Lumi
- Georgina Rich as Wilhelmina Fassbinder (series 3–present), the CFO of Pierpoint who champions their pivot to ESG
- Tom Stourton as James Ashford (series 3–present), CEO of Ashford Asset Management and prominent investor in Lumi
- Fady Elsayed as Ali El Mansour (series 3), a new Pierpoint hire who hails from a wealthy Egyptian family
- Gustav Lindh as Xander Lindt (series 3), the cocky heir to the Lindt empire and a member of Henry's entourage
- Joel Kim Booster as Frank Wade (series 3), (Note: Joel Kim Booster only appears in "It" in series 3, although credited amongst the main cast.) an energy analyst at Pierpoint
- Asim Chaudhry as Vinay Sarkar (series 3), Rishi's loan shark
- Harry Hadden-Paton as Tom Wolsey (series 3), the new CEO of Pierpoint
- Charlie Heaton as James Dycker (series 4), a financial journalist investigating Tender, a payment processing startup
- Toheeb Jimoh as Kwabena Bannerman (series 4), a trader at Mostyn Asset Management who is casually involved with Harper
- Kal Penn as Jonah Atterbury (series 4), the irresponsible CEO and co-founder of Tender
- Kiernan Shipka as Hayley Clay (series 4), executive assistant at Tender
- Max Minghella as Whitney Halberstram (series 4), the enigmatic CFO and co-founder of Tender
- Edward Holcroft as Sebastian Stefanowicz (series 4), a Reform MP for South Thanet, aligned with the Dark Enlightenment movement
- Amy James-Kelly as Jennifer Bevan (series 4), a newly promoted Labour Party Minister of State for Industry
- Claire Forlani as Cordelia Hanani-Spyrka (series 4), (Note: Claire Forlani only appears in "The Commander and the Grey Lady" in series 4, although credited amongst the main cast.) Yasmin's aunt and Charles' sister
- Jack Farthing as "The Commander" (series 4), (Note: Jack Farthing only appears in "The Commander and the Grey Lady" in series 4, although credited amongst the main cast.) Henry's deceased father
- Susanne Wuest as Princess Johanna Bauer (series 4), an Austrian noblewoman whose family owns IBN Bauer Bank and has historical links to Nazi Germany
- Stephen Campbell Moore as Tony Day (series 4), Tender's CFO in the EMEA region, based in Accra
- Pip Torrens as Kevin Rawle (season 4), (Note: Pip Torrens only appears in "Points of Emphasis" in series 4, although credited amongst the main cast.) the editor of The Patriot, a right-leaning tabloid owned by Norton

== Episodes ==
=== Series overview ===
Series	Episodes	Originally released	
Series	Episodes	First released	Last released
1	8	9 November 2020	21 December 2020
2	8	1 August 2022	19 September 2022
3	8	11 August 2024	29 September 2024
4	8	11 January 2026	1 March 2026

=== Series 1 (2020) ===
No. overall	No. in series	Title	Directed by	Written by	Original release date (Note: Episodes 4–8 of Industry were released on HBO Max on November 27, 2020, ahead of its weekly HBO premieres.)	U.S. viewers (millions)
1	1	"Induction"	Lena Dunham	Mickey Down and Konrad Kay	9 November 2020	0.089
Graduate applicants Harper Stern, Yasmin Kara-Hanani, Gus Sackey, Hari Dhar and Robert Spearing are hired to entry-level placements on the trading floor of Pierpoint & Co, a prestigious London investment bank. The grads are told that on Reduction in Force (RIF) day in six months, they will be given full-time jobs or let go. American Harper is driven, which appeals to fiery managing director Eric Tao, but has to ask her boyfriend at home to forge a transcript for her. Harper's line manager Daria Greenock invites her to a dinner with a client, Nicole Craig. Harper's investment proposition to Nicole makes a positive impression. After dinner, Nicole sexually touches Harper, making her reluctant to close the deal. Gus and Hari work on an upcoming pitch; Hari continually works overnight at the office while abusing energy drinks and stimulant pills, aiming to impress with his dedication, while Gus is more relaxed. Hari completes the pitch document but spirals after noticing a minor error, before collapsing dead in a Pierpoint bathroom stall. Shaken by Hari's death and spurred on by overhearing some colleagues' racist comments against her, Harper calls Nicole, secures the deal, and sends her forged transcript to Pierpoint's HR.
2	2	"Quiet and Nice"	Tinge Krishnan	Mickey Down and Konrad Kay	16 November 2020	0.127
Harper struggles with life in London, continuing to live in a hotel. She unsuccessfully looks for an apartment to share but her personality is never a good fit. She later makes a sale to Nicole. Yasmin quickly falls prey to the sexist culture of the FX desk, facing repeated bullying from her line manager Kenny Kilbane. At a Pierpoint-sponsored dinner for the grads, Kenny verbally abuses Yasmin but Harper steps in, angering a drunken Kenny as Eric advises him to leave. Yasmin begins to manipulatively flirt with Robert. Robert's manager Clement Cowan has a single client and is indifferent to Robert's need to impress management for a permanent job. After Hari's death, Pierpoint disbands Gus' team, leaving his future uncertain, and he ends up alienating Sara Dhadwal, the London office manager, when talking to her. Yasmin invites Harper to stay at her house and a friendship forms.
3	3	"Notting Hill"	Tinge Krishnan	Sam H. Freeman	23 November 2020	0.124
Eric loses a major client, Felim Bichan, after offending his wife, forcing grads to drum up new business. Gus is assigned to Clement, working with Robert. Harper has now moved into Yasmin's house, but they both struggle to keep their friendship and professional lives separate. Harper finds herself increasingly pulled between Eric, her boss, and Daria, her line manager. Work stress manifests outside of work when Harper purposely hooks up with a man who looks like Sebastian, Yasmin's boyfriend. Yasmin and Harper agree to a formal rental agreement.
4	4	"Sesh"	Ed Lilly	Mickey Down and Konrad Kay	30 November 2020	0.111
Harper has a wild birthday celebration with Robert, Yasmin, and Greg. Her lack of focus the next day causes problems as she trades on the wrong currency, putting her team at risk for major losses. Given a chance to break even, Harper instead pushes her luck and makes her losses worse, and she appeals to Nicole to make a purchase and save her, which Nicole is hesitant to do. Harper later confesses her misconduct to Eric, who reveals that Nicole made the purchase to cover her losses, and that he knows she never graduated from college. The two bond over being upstarts hungry for success among colleagues of privilege. Yasmin and Robert represent Pierpoint at a college recruitment event, but are attacked with dye by a protester, bringing them closer. At home, Yasmin is becoming distant from Sebastian, and continues flirting with Robert. Frustrated by his position, Gus further alienates his coworkers and insults Clement.
5	5	"Learned Behaviour"	Ed Lilly	Mickey Down and Konrad Kay	7 December 2020	0.116
A former Pierpoint VP writes an exposé on the bank's toxic culture and management goes into damage control. Eric goes offsite, leaving his grads unsupervised. Although unauthorized, Gus covers trades at his desk, while Harper unsuccessfully tries to convince Felim to return to Pierpoint. Both go too far and get in hot water. A furious Eric locks Harper in a conference room and berates her for failing to court Felim back to Pierpoint, noting that he gave her a bonus double that of the other grads. Clement brings Robert to Amsterdam to meet their only client. The meeting goes well and Clement buys Robert a fitted suit as a gift. Clement reveals that he is actually Scottish, and like Robert, was born of lower class and strives to fit in with those born of privilege. Robert also discovers Clement is a heroin addict. Yasmin attempts to get a family friend, Maxim Alonso, who runs a large fund, to bring his business to Pierpoint. She brings Kenny, who humiliates Yasmin after getting drunk and ordering a stripper to their table.
6	6	"Nutcracker"	Tinge Krishnan	Kate Verghese; Mickey Down and Konrad Kay	14 December 2020	0.086
Pierpoint holds its annual holiday party. Sara makes clear to Gus that she has plans to change the culture at Pierpoint to be less toxic and more inclusive. Maxim's unexpected arrival aggravates tensions between Yasmin and Kenny; Yasmin snaps at Maxim after he criticizes her for not speaking up against Kenny's behavior at the strip club, and later confronts an indignant Kenny about his behavior. Greg parties a little too hard with Robert and Usman, hurting himself by running into a glass door and having to go to hospital. Yasmin pleasures Robert in the bathroom. Theo's fiancee catches him being intimate with Gus. Harper confides in Daria about what happened with Eric and being locked in the conference room; Daria tells Sara, and they push Harper to file a complaint against Eric. Harper realises she is a pawn in a battle of cultures but signs the documents. Eric is placed on leave.
7	7	"Pre-Crisis Activity"	Mary Nighy	Mickey Down and Konrad Kay	21 December 2020	0.113
RIF day looms. Sara and Daria let Harper keep the unauthorized, outsize bonus that Eric gave her, as long as she stays quiet about it. Yasmin considers leaving the FX desk. Sebastian decides to throw a fancy catered meal for the grads at Yasmin's house, but charges the guests, much to Yasmin's embarrassment. The dinner proves a failure when food arrives late and the grads become too intoxicated; Harper lets slip that she was paid double the bonus as everyone else. Yasmin breaks up with Sebastian, and later walks in on a cocaine-addled Robert and Harper having sex; she initiates a threesome between them, but a jealous Harper becomes uncomfortable and backs out. Daria tells Harper she is required to pay back her surplus bonus after breaking her vow of confidentiality. Harper antagonizes Nicole into cutting ties with Pierpoint. Yasmin's boss Hilary Wyndham learns how Kenny had harassed her because of monitored communication with Maxim, but encourages her to be a "team player" and not say anything.
8	8	"Reduction in Force"	Ed Lilly	Mickey Down and Konrad Kay	21 December 2020	0.103
On RIF day, grads present to the managers but their presentations are also broadcast on the trading floor. Bill Adler, Pierpoint's global head of FICC, flies in from New York for the presentations. In his, Robert talks about client relationships, getting Adler's positive attention and a job offer. Yasmin gives an uninspiring presentation, but her boss vouches for her being a "team player" and she is hired. Gus reads a note to begin his presentation, a line of which was part of a bet, and then leaves the room. He is not hired. Harper has an anxiety attack and leaves the presentation room without saying a word. Among the managers, Daria supports Harper. Adler invites Harper to a private meeting with Eric and encourages her to recant, as Eric is too valuable to the firm. Sara pulls Harper aside and tells her that they can create a new culture at Pierpoint. Seeing how Daria expects her to know her place while Eric encouraged her hunger to succeed, Harper recants and is hired, Eric returns, and Daria is let go. Yasmin, who was going to leave FX to work for Daria, is angry at Harper for reinforcing the worst parts of Pierpoint's culture.

=== Series 2 (2022) ===
No. overall	No. in series	Title	Directed by	Written by	Original release date	U.S. viewers (millions)
9	1	"Daddy"	Birgitte Stærmose	Mickey Down and Konrad Kay	1 August 2022	0.082
As Pierpoint traders return to work after COVID-19, Harper continues to work remotely from the hotel where she is living. There, she meets notorious hedge fund manager Jesse Bloom, who profited heavily from the pandemic. Eric tells Harper she needs to return to the office, frustrated that she has lost her edge. Yasmin and Harper continue their feud in and outside the office. Amid talks of closing either the New York or London office, Daniel Van Deventer (nicknamed "DVD") arrives from the New York office. Robert is sober but is struggling with confidence, and struggles to make enough outgoing calls. While Kenny is away in rehab, Yasmin essentially leads the desk, castigating a female grad and using personal contacts to bring in business. At a party, Maxim tells Yasmin that his fund is closing, and Yasmin meets Celeste Pacquet, a Pierpoint Private Wealth Manager. Harper stands up Eric at a client meeting with Felim, instead going to see Bloom speak.
10	2	"The Giant Squid"	Birgitte Stærmose	Mickey Down and Konrad Kay	8 August 2022	0.076
Rishi has pre-buy stock options that Eric guarantees he can sell to Felim. Worried about his position, Eric pushes Robert to call inactive clients. Robert cold calls Nicole Craig, winning her over by admitting he is out of his depth. At dinner, the two connect on both being of modest beginnings trying to find their identity among the elite. She makes a successful advance on the drive home. Yasmin begins a relationship with Maxim, which is complicated when her father Charles shows up unexpectedly. Celeste invites Yasmin to a client dinner, but Yasmin misinterprets her role as being sexual. Feeling lost at the FX desk, she tries to get her father to move his assets to Pierpoint and away from Maxim. Harper begins to court Bloom as a client. Eric feels threatened seeing DVD, his former protegé, in a position of authority. Harper is stuck in the middle. When DVD insists Harper answer a call from Felim against Eric's orders, she blows the deal. To cover, she gets Bloom to buy the stock at the last moment, leaving Eric feeling even less in control.
11	3	"The Fool"	Isabella Eklöf	Matthew Barry	15 August 2022	0.075
Pierpoint hosts a shooting holiday to celebrate the stock purchases, but had assumed Felim, not Bloom, would be the major buyer. Felim and Bloom are antagonistic, as Felim rejects his modest beginnings while Bloom embraces his. Gus is hired by Bloom to tutor his wayward son, Leo, on a university essay. After trying to help, Gus tells Leo that success is true rebellion. At a meeting with Celeste, Yasmin's father treats her like a child and not a professional, embarrassing her. When Yasmin reluctantly brings Kenny to a client meeting, he winds up connecting more than she does. Eric pushes Harper to get in line and have Bloom to sell his shares to Felim. Harper bristles at this and senses Bloom and another investor are being lied to and has to decide who she supports: Pierpoint or her client. She confronts Eric who reminds her that he is the boss. Yasmin drops by Harper's apartment looking for advice. Harper is still away, but she and Robert chat. Robert acknowledges the control she had over him and advises using her manipulative power on her father. Against Eric's orders, Harper advises Bloom to keep his shares and buy those of FutureDawn Partners, a socially conscious investment fund, for a controlling interest.
12	4	"There Are Some Women..."	Isabella Eklöf	Zara Meerza	22 August 2022	0.094
Eric has taken two weeks off and DVD takes over his duties. This includes handing out bonus checks, which causes Eric to feel displaced and pushes him to visit the New York office. Harper receives the maximum compensation after a great year. In trying to get her family's money to Pierpoint, Yasmin discovers their finances are in disarray thanks to her father's nondisclosure settlements with women he had affairs with. At a party, Celeste flirts with Yasmin but later mentions she has a wife. Now having an affair with Nicole, Robert learns she made advances on Harper their first year at Pierpoint. Gus is now working for an MP connected to Anna, while engaged in a relationship with Leo Bloom. Yasmin visits Harper at her home, late, worried about a life without family money. The next day, Harper and DVD share their family backgrounds and later sleep together. That same night she advises Bloom to go against advice DVD gave him. In New York, Eric tries to have DVD fired but DVD has already maneuvered to take Eric's place. Defeated, Eric is assigned a meaningless position and given a corner office.
13	5	"Kitchen Season"	Caleb Femi	Mickey Down and Konrad Kay	29 August 2022	0.067
DVD and Harper continue their sexual relationship. Yasmin travels to Berlin to transition a client to Jackie. Harper talks her way on to the trip, hoping to find her estranged brother, John. She does. The two bring Yasmin to a nightclub and take drugs, breaking John's six months of sobriety. Later, John shares the pressure he was under from their mother and why he disappeared. As Harper tries to take care of John, he rejects her and calls her selfish. Robert finds out Clement has died. He is sent to Oxford with Venetia, a grad on the FX desk, to recruit a much sought-after graduate. There, he struggles to reconnect with his father, a local publican, and breaks his sobriety. At dinner with the recruit, drunk, he successfully sells Pierpoint as the goal of all of her work. The next day, sober, he makes peace with his father. Gus is invited to do more important work for the MP he is working for. Yasmin connects with her former nanny, Theresa, but confronts her on whether she had an affair with Yasmin's father; she reveals she did and turns Yasmin away. Back in London, Harper is cold towards DVD. When he asks her if she had an affair while in Berlin, Harper rebuffs and insults him.
14	6	"Short to the Point of Pain"	Caleb Femi	Joseph Charlton	5 September 2022	0.145
Yasmin flirts with Celeste, who declines. Harper, having convinced Bloom to go short on a brick-and-mortar drugstore chain, finds the market moving against them. Bloom visits Pierpoint, furious with Harper for going AWOL in Berlin. Hoping to help, DVD tells Harper that Adler is shutting down the London office but that she alone has been invited to New York. Yasmin tries to reconnect with a distracted Harper on her last day; she later meets Celeste and they have sex. Kenny tearfully apologizes to Yasmin for the way he treated her as an intern. Gus turns down his promotion, disappointing his family. Eric warns Harper not to trust DVD. Bloom tries to reconnect with his son Leo, who is dating Gus. Harper convinces Bloom of a plan to unload their holdings against Pierpoint's interest. Rishi realizes he was played, and DVD admits he listened to Harper's call with Bloom; he suspends Harper from the desk. Trying to salvage her career, Harper goes to Bloom, urging him to push their position at his speaking engagement. Gus' sister tells him to "stop dancing"; he urges Leo to reconcile with Bloom. Leo calls just before Bloom takes the stage, leading Bloom to cancel the speech and scuttling Harper's play. Feeling finished at Pierpoint, Harper goes to Eric with a plan.
15	7	"Lone Wolf and Cub"	Isabella Eklöf	Mickey Down and Konrad Kay	12 September 2022	0.053
Harper, Eric, and Rishi form an uneasy alliance to position themselves as a team and leave Pierpoint for another bank. Harper tries to sell herself as Bloom's manager, but he is not returning her calls, and what Eric believed was a secured deal to join another firm proves to be a ploy by that firm to pressure a different team. Gus reconnects with a tutor at Oxford and arranges a deal for Leo to get in, leveraging his ministry work. At a party at Yasmin's house, Maxim attempts to sexually assault her; furious, she throws everyone out. Venetia later invites herself to a tense dinner between Robert and Nicole to gain client exposure. Feeling scorned, Nicole fights with Robert, who leaves—then, recalling her history of assaulting grads, he returns to intervene but arrives too late. Nicole assaults Venetia, who seeks support from Yasmin, only to be brushed off. Venetia then accuses Robert of knowing what would happen. After denying it, Robert tells the truth to DVD, who brings it to Adler; Adler instructs him to bury it since the London office is being shut down. Kenny confronts Yasmin about dismissing Venetia, but she responds angrily, citing his past harassment. Disgusted by Adler and made aware of Harper, Eric, and Rishi's plans, DVD decides to join their exit.
16	8	"Jerusalem"	Isabella Eklöf	Mickey Down and Konrad Kay	19 September 2022	0.127
A frustrated Gus gives Harper insider information, which she passes to Bloom. Bloom goes on television and changes the political agenda whilst texting Harper to execute trades, sending his holdings into profit. Gus' MP Aurore is promoted to health secretary, but Gus is fired for the leak; Bloom later hires him as an assistant. Harper, Eric, Rishi, and DVD receive an offer from another bank but would have to relocate to New York. Unwilling to leave London, Harper and Eric go to Adler and pitch a leaner London office, labeling Rishi and DVD as disloyal, and threaten to expose Nicole's assaults and Pierpoint's neglect. Adler accepts. Before Rishi's wedding, Harper learns he will be fired but keeps it to herself. After Yasmin confronts her father over his sexual affairs—accusing him of grooming their childhood babysitter—he cuts her off financially and changes the locks on her apartment. At the wedding, Harper and an anxious Rishi have sex in a bathroom. Robert leaves to get cocaine for Yasmin but is arrested; Nicole bails him out the next morning and reasserts control over him. The following week, DVD is fired along with much of the London office. Harper is shocked to find Rishi still at his desk. Eric brings her to HR, where she realizes he reported her—not for insider trading but for lying about graduating from college. He tells her he has no choice but to fire her.

=== Series 3 (2024) ===
No. overall	No. in series	Title	Directed by	Written by	Original release date	U.S. viewers (millions)
17	1	"Il Mattino ha L'Oro in Bocca"	Isabella Eklöf	Mickey Down and Konrad Kay	11 August 2024	N/A
Yasmin vacations in Italy on her father's yacht, catching him performing oral sex on a pregnant employee. Six weeks later, he is missing and has been exposed for embezzling from Hanani Publishing. Yasmin evades paparazzi amidst leaked photos of her on the boat and potential lawsuits. Pierpoint is now focused on ESG investments. Eric, separated from his wife, is promoted to partner, but Adler demands that Eric fire a member of the trading desk. As the firm gears up to take Lumi, a green energy company, public, investor James Ashford voices concerns about Lumi's inflated quarterly earnings reports. Sir Henry Muck, Lumi's CEO, returns Ashford's shares, while Yasmin scrambles to find last-minute investors. At Henry's behest, Yasmin visits his club, where his uncle and godfather make it clear she must pay for her father's debts. After staying the night at Nicole's, Robert wakes up to her dead next to him, and enters work the morning of the IPO traumatized, but Eric motivates him to return to Lumi's offices for the IPO. Instead of firing Yasmin or Robert as he initially contemplated, Eric fires Kenny. The power goes out across London the exact moment Lumi goes public.
18	2	"Smoke and Mirrors"	Isabella Eklöf	Mickey Down and Konrad Kay	18 August 2024	N/A
The power outage sends Lumi's stock into a tailspin, with both Pierpoint and FutureDawn (where Harper is now working as an assistant to Anna Gearing) scrambling to sell shares. Amid Henry's erratic behavior, Robert snaps at him over his flippancy and entitlement, leading to a fight. Robert goes to Nicole's house to pick up a necklace given to him by Venetia (who he is now dating). He discovers that Nicole has a 15-year-old daughter, and leaves when she tries to make a sexual advance. Yasmin arranges a meeting at an exclusive club between Henry, his godfather Otto Mostyn, and a potential investor from a major electricity company, while alerting the paparazzi to her own presence there; the resulting photographs of the meeting spark rumors of Lumi's possible acquisition, boosting Lumi's stock enough to carry it through the IPO. Henry invites Yasmin to dinner to thank her, and the two begin flirting. At FutureDawn, Harper helps portfolio manager Petra Koenig hedge her exposure from the Lumi IPO by having her go through Yasmin to buy credit default swaps on oil and natural gas shares, despite it contradicting FutureDawn's ESG commitments; as a result, she wins Petra's respect while antagonizing Anna.
19	3	"It"	Zoé Wittock	Mickey Down and Konrad Kay	25 August 2024	0.133
Pierpoint joins Lumi for a climate conference in Switzerland, hoping to retain the rest of their ESG pipeline amidst rumors of their overvaluing Lumi pre-IPO. Henry insists on bringing Yasmin along. Petra, disillusioned with Anna, decides to start her own hedge fund with Harper; the two discreetly attend the conference to court potential investors. Pierpoint analyst Frank Wade publishes a research report making a damning "hold" recommendation on Lumi stock in the middle of Eric's panel discussion with Henry and Anna, which Harper announces during a Q&A session along with the fact that she and Petra are starting their own fund. They get the attention of Otto Mostyn, who agrees to provide them with seed capital. Harper and Petra decide to enlist Pierpoint as their broker, further humiliating Eric. Accepting Lumi's downfall, Henry confides to Yasmin that he chose to start his own company to stave off the depression he faced after his father's suicide, and that he brought her on the trip in hopes of courting her. The two have sex on his private jet on the flight back, in view of Eric and Robert.
20	4	"White Mischief"	Zoé Wittock	Mickey Down and Konrad Kay	1 September 2024	N/A
Rishi is revealed to be deep in debt: not only does he owe £200,000 in gambling debts to loan sharks, but took a £300 million long position on pound sterling against the US dollar during the 12-hour risk limit increase that Adler granted him the day of Lumi's IPO, betting that a rumored tax cut will raise the value of the pound. It has the opposite effect, putting Rishi at risk of booking millions in losses. During an office Christmas party, Rishi collects £8,000 from colleagues for an office betting pool, but instead gambles it at a casino. He initially wins big, parties (getting into a fight with a patron), then gambles his newly earned cash, only to lose it all. The next morning, Pierpoint learns that the UK chancellor is reversing the tax cut while the Bank of England raises interest rates, increasing the value of the pound and netting Rishi £18 million. Rishi goes home and has an argument with his wife Diana over his infidelity and gambling addiction, during which she admits to an affair with a family friend whose cricket pavilion Rishi is renovating. Diana agrees to cover Rishi's loan debts. Rishi cathartically ransacks the pavilion the next day and calls his loan shark to report that he has recovered his money, only to take out another loan to gamble away.
21	5	"Company Man"	Isabella Eklöf	Mickey Down and Konrad Kay	8 September 2024	N/A
Lumi is subject to a select committee inquiry by MP Lisa Dearn following its collapse and subsequent taxpayer-funded government bailout, which left millions of low-income households using Lumi with mounting energy bills. Robert is sent as Pierpoint's representative, realizing he is their scapegoat. Aurore, however, takes responsibility for Lumi's failure and resigns from her cabinet position. Afterwards, Henry takes Robert to his club, where Aurore reveals her performance was a ploy to win over the public in preparation to run for prime minister. Meanwhile, new Pierpoint hire Sweetpea Golightly tells Eric she discovered that Pierpoint cannot pay off the outsize debt it issued to fund its ESG pivot due to the string of failed ESG IPOs post-Lumi. Eric tells Sweetpea to keep it quiet, but Harper overhears Sweetpea telling Yasmin in the bathroom. Adler later confirms to Eric that Pierpoint is on the brink of collapse, and reveals that he is dying of a malignant brain tumor. Robert joins Henry on an ayahuasca trip and hallucinates Nicole and his mother, and returns home the next morning at peace. Yasmin joins him in bed, and tells him she killed her father; Robert laughs it off as a joke.
22	6	"Nikki Beach, or: So Many Ways to Lose"	Isabella Eklöf	Joseph Charlton	15 September 2024	N/A
A flashback to Yasmin's summer vacation reveals that her father jumped off the deck of the yacht while drunk, as a spiteful response to Yasmin wishing him dead; Yasmin made no attempt to save him from drowning, and Harper - who was also on the boat - helped cover up her involvement. In the present, Charles' body is discovered, and Yasmin identifies it for the autopsy. Eric later takes Yasmin out to lunch and drunkenly attempts to proposition her, which she angrily rebuffs. Harper informs Petra of Pierpoint's looming debt crisis. Petra gets an unwitting Yasmin to provide them with a list of Pierpoint's ESG positions, despite Harper's hesitation to exploit her grieving friend. Upon learning of this, a furious Eric storms into Harper's office to berate her. Harper and Petra enlist Kenny, Daria and Jackie - now all working for Goldman Sachs - to aid them in shorting their ex-employer. Eric fires Yasmin after photos of Charles' corpse leak on the Internet, and reveals Harper's betrayal to her in the process. Yasmin has a vicious argument with Harper at home, destroying their friendship.
23	7	"Useful Idiot"	Mickey Down and Konrad Kay	Mickey Down and Konrad Kay	22 September 2024	N/A
Yasmin learns that Hanani Publishing intends to pay off the settlements to her father's victims while making her the scapegoat. She joins Robert on a road trip to Wales to interview for a venture capital position at Little Labs, a psilocybin startup. That night, Yasmin takes a heavy dose of the drug and breaks down; the next morning, she decides to fight her father's company in court. On Pierpoint's 150th anniversary, its stock plummets, and new CEO Tom Wolsey and his executives — including Adler and Eric — scramble for emergency funding. The US Treasury Department refuses to bailout the firm, while a planned Barclays acquisition collapses over regulatory concerns. Harper learns of the Barclays CEO's arrival from Rishi and realizes an acquisition would jeopardize the short; Petra refuses to call it off, forcing Harper to admit she illegally acted on confidential information. Petra reports this to Otto. Adler brokers a meeting with Mitsubishi, but Eric exploits Adler's illness to gaslight him into believing he overlooked a major dealbook error, forcing Adler to reveal his illness to the room. As he leaves, Adler realizes Eric's betrayal. Eric reveals he reached out to trader Ali El Mansour — heir to the Egyptian sovereign wealth fund Al-Mi'raj — to bring his family in as Pierpoint's buyers.
24	8	"Infinite Largesse"	Mickey Down and Konrad Kay	Mickey Down and Konrad Kay	29 September 2024	N/A
Yasmin and Robert visit Henry's family estate after she asks Henry to provide seed funding to Little Labs. Henry's uncle, Lord Norton, a newspaper proprietor, suggests Yasmin's PR issues would vanish if she married Henry. After wandering the estate, Yasmin and Robert finally have sex and confess their love, but she chooses to marry Henry for the security offered by his family empire, and Robert accepts her decision. Otto, impressed by Harper's ruthlessness, tells her he wants her as his successor. Still, Harper and Petra call off the Pierpoint short to keep their operation legal, ending their partnership with Otto. Rishi quits Pierpoint to work for Harper, only to discover her offer was a setup to humiliate him on behalf of Sweetpea and Anraj. Six months later, Eric learns Adler has died and that Al-Mi'raj is closing the London trading floor; he calls Harper to wish her well. Harper partners with Otto to start a short-only fund. Rishi's loan shark Vinay confronts him and Diana, then shoots Diana dead. Yasmin rebuilds her public image and reconciles with Harper. Robert thrives pitching Little Labs to VCs in California.

=== Series 4 (2026) ===
No. overall	No. in series	Title	Directed by	Written by	Original release date	U.S. viewers (millions)
25	1	"PayPal of Bukkake"	Mickey Down and Konrad Kay	Mickey Down and Konrad Kay	11 January 2026	N/A
Harper runs a short-only fund at Mostyn Asset Management with Sweetpea and new trader Kwabena Bannerman, but chafes under Otto's increasing oversight. After Labour's landslide victory in the UK general election, Minister for Industry Jennifer Bevan proposes a sweeping online safety bill threatening porn aggregators like Siren, which Harper plans to short using insider information from Rishi. Anticipating the regulations, Whitney Halberstram, CFO of payment processing startup Tender, cuts their contracts with Siren and other pornography and gambling clients to pivot toward banking, over CEO Jonah Atterbury's objections. When Eric's family office pulls its investment after the unpopular Siren short, Harper gates the fund to prevent withdrawals. This infuriates Otto, now a Lord, who doesn't want Harper jeopardizing his peerage. Harper realizes that Otto hired her as a "face" to appear inclusive. At a party hosted by Yasmin, Harper meets Whitney, whom Yasmin connects to Bevan for regulatory leverage in exchange for a Tender role for Henry. Harper and Whitney sleep together; later, FinDigest reporter Jim Dycker calls Harper and hints that Tender is covering up misconduct. Whitney ousts Jonah and becomes interim CEO. Disillusioned with Otto, Harper summons Eric out of retirement to partner on a new firm.
26	2	"The Commander and the Grey Lady"	Mickey Down and Konrad Kay	Mickey Down and Konrad Kay	18 January 2026	N/A
Henry, who became a Conservative MP, loses his seat to Bevan in the general election and, six months later, spirals into suicidal depression, straining his marriage with Yasmin, who attempts to broker him a role at Tender. Yasmin throws Henry an extravagant 40th birthday party, which he largely spends taking drugs and avoiding guests. Whitney offers Henry the CEO position at Tender, hoping to leverage his aristocratic connections. Meanwhile, Yasmin's aunt Cordelia warns her against tying her future to Henry; Yasmin later discovers Cordelia performing oral sex on Otto and confronts her afterwards. An intoxicated Henry causes a scene at his birthday dinner before leaving with an old friend, "the Commander," later revealed to be a hallucination of Henry's father, whose suicide on his own 40th birthday Henry witnessed. After violently assaulting a man at a pub who insults Yasmin, Henry attempts suicide via carbon monoxide poisoning in his father's vintage Jaguar E-Type but relents at the last moment. He instead has passionate sex with Yasmin atop the car, suddenly invigorated by outliving his father, and accepts Whitney's CEO offer. He then takes Yasmin on a joyride in the Jaguar and suggests they try for a child, unsettling her.
27	3	"Habseligkeiten"	Michelle Savill	Joseph Charlton	25 January 2026	N/A
Harper and Eric launch their short-only fund, SternTao, but face investor skepticism. Harper names Tender their target after Dycker tips her off that the company is laundering illegal porn and gambling payments out of Africa. Eric traces a listed Tender satellite office to an apartment in Sunderland, where Harper and Sweetpea discover a contractor manually re-entering African transactions into spreadsheets obscuring the underlying services. Harper gives the evidence to Dycker, who is forced to publish a heavily edited investigation. Tender, meanwhile, pursues a merger with family-owned Austrian bank IBN Bauer, requiring approval from the UK's Prudential Regulation Authority, while also facing objections from heir Moritz-Hunter Bauer over data privacy and ideological opposition rooted in his fascist worldview. At the Bauers' estate, Yasmin engineers a threesome with Henry and Tender executive assistant Hayley Clay, and agrees to publish Moritz's views in Norton's paper in exchange for his backing the merger. Henry and Whitney meet Bevan, Lisa Dearn (now business secretary), and the PRA, where the PM's chief of staff pressures regulators to approve the deal. Eric liquidates his family office to fund SternTao. Harper, Eric, Sweetpea, and Kwabena meet Kenny at Deutsche Bank to execute the Tender short.
28	4	"1000 Yoots, 1 Marilyn"	Michelle Savill	Mickey Down and Konrad Kay	1 February 2026	N/A
Tender prepares to launch its banking app, securing a billion-dollar investment from Pierpoint; Yasmin arranges to have Henry present the app at the WebHorizon conference. Whitney obtains photos of Harper meeting Dycker, deduces SternTao is shorting Tender, and alerts Yasmin. Despite misgivings, Henry delivers a strong WebHorizon speech. At a Q&A afterwards, Dycker presses Whitney about Sunderland, which Whitney dismisses. Yasmin enlists Norton to defame Dycker for colluding with SternTao. Additionally, Dycker is accused by Hayley—whom he had spent the night with while seeking information on Tender—of sexual assault, leading to his firing. Whitney names Yasmin head of communications. Sweetpea contacts Jonah, who sends her internal Tender emails identifying Tony Day, Tender's Africa CFO, who she learns oversaw suspicious regional acquisitions; Harper urges Sweetpea to investigate further in Accra, where Day is based and which Whitney frequents. Rishi lets his mother-in-law change his son Hugo's surname to Smith in exchange for continued visitation. Dycker later meets Rishi and goes on a cocaine binge with him and a stranger they meet at a bar, who gives them drugs that cause Dycker to overdose. Police arrive; Rishi attempts to flee by jumping off the balcony, but breaks both ankles and is arrested.
29	5	"Eyes Without a Face"	Luke Snellin	Joseph Charlton	8 February 2026 (Note: The fifth episode was released early on HBO Max on February 6, 2026, due to Super Bowl LX.)	N/A
SternTao faces an imminent margin call after Tender's stock continues to rise; with Dycker dead, Harper sends Sweetpea and Kwabena to Accra to find further evidence against Tender. Eric learns his daughter Lily was expelled from school for catfishing, while Harper discovers her mother has died suddenly; Eric consoles her. In Accra, Sweetpea investigates SwiftGC, a local payment processor acquired by Tender, but finds its listed address is a PO box and its calls route to Tender's Dublin call centre. Meetings with Swift's lawyer and with Tony Day yield little, though Day appears evasive. After Day contacts Sweetpea again, a man assaults her in a bar bathroom. Sweetpea and Kwabena have sex afterwards. The next morning, Kwabena leverages family connections to meet Mrs. Mensah, daughter of Swift's late ex-CEO, who reveals Tender paid only a fraction of the $50 million claimed for Swift. Sweetpea and Kwabena locate Swift's real office, an empty call-forwarding site, and realize Tender is not laundering money but fabricating profits by overstating acquisition costs (while bribing Ghanaian officials for publicity), then recycling fake revenue to appear successful. They report their findings to Harper. Day considers whistleblowing. Harper prepares to present SternTao's findings publicly.
30	6	"Dear Henry"	Luke Snellin	Mickey Down and Konrad Kay	15 February 2026	N/A
Harper warns Yasmin that Tender is fraudulent; Yasmin rebuffs her, but later shares her doubts with Henry, who initially dismisses them but grows suspicious during dinner with Whitney and Tender's auditor. Whitney takes Henry on a bender at a gay club, jeopardizing Henry's sobriety. Harper presents SternTao's findings at a conference, causing Tender's stock to fall 28%. It is revealed that Russian foreign intelligence agencies hold a controlling interest in Tender. Whitney intercepts Day's meeting with Sweetpea and FinDigest editor Edward Burgess, knowing the Russians will kill Day for whistleblowing, and persuades him to remain loyal. Eric receives a secretly recorded video of himself with a prostitute, Dolly, along with photos of her passport revealing her to be underage. He nevertheless debates Whitney on CNN; during the broadcast, Day calls in to defend Tender, but Eric counters by calling for a new audit. Afterwards, to protect Harper, Eric exits SternTao, refusing to say why. Hayley confesses to Yasmin that she was hired by Whitney from an escort agency to gather compromising material on powerful people, admitting to secretly recording their threesome with Henry. Henry fires Tender's auditor and confronts Whitney, who gives him a letter explaining he is criminally implicated.
31	7	"Points of Emphasis"	Mickey Down and Konrad Kay	Mickey Down and Konrad Kay	22 February 2026	N/A
Henry and Yasmin panic after reading Whitney's letter, but Henry refuses to go to the authorities. To complicate regulatory scrutiny of Tender, Whitney proposes a hostile takeover of Pierpoint, claiming he has quietly built a stake; he and Henry travel to New York to make the bid at Pierpoint's annual general meeting. Whitney attempts to disappear, but his Russian handlers intercept him and force him to proceed with the takeover, threatening him by revealing they murdered Dycker. At the AGM, Whitney offers 1.9 times book value in a bid largely composed of volatile Tender stock. Meanwhile, Yasmin persuades Harper to circulate allegations that Dearn suppressed a memo voicing concerns about Tender. Harper brings the claim to Burgess, who publishes it while Norton's tabloids amplify it, forcing Dearn's resignation and exposing Tender to a Serious Fraud Office investigation and new audit. Wilhelmina admits to Henry that Whitney never in fact bought a stake in Pierpoint, while she herself merely used his takeover bid to leverage another offer. A distressed Henry tries calling Whitney but finds his phone abandoned at his desk. Harper and Yasmin meet at a bar, where they admit their mutual jealousy and resentments, then dance together at a club.
32	8	"Both, And"	Mickey Down and Konrad Kay	Mickey Down and Konrad Kay	1 March 2026	N/A
Bevan defends the government on television after the Tender scandal; Day is arrested while police search Tender's London headquarters. Yasmin divorces Henry. Whitney urges Henry to flee with him to Vilnius, revealing Russia's involvement in Tender and offering him a forged Lithuanian passport. Henry initially boards the plane but refuses to abandon his identity, harshly rebuking Whitney, and returns home, where police arrest him. Harper, Sweetpea, and Kwabena earn £110 million from Tender's collapse and distribute £2 million each, later exploring a new office. Henry accepts a plea deal for breach of fiduciary duty and testifies against Whitney; Otto warns him not to implicate Russia, citing the risk of assassination. Yasmin cultivates Reform politician Sebastian Stefanowicz and hosts a fundraiser for him in Paris. Harper confronts Yasmin over the extremist views of the guests and the presence of Hayley and other young escorts brought in to entertain them. Yasmin defends her actions, arguing she is creating opportunity rather than exploitation, and shows Harper the compromising video of Eric. A shaken Harper later tells Kwabena she no longer recognizes those closest to her. Henry serves house arrest at Norton's estate. Harper is interviewed about the Tender short and ponders her future. An image of Whitney flashes on the screen.

== Production ==
In November 2017, it was announced that HBO had put the series into development, with Mickey Down and Konrad Kay set to write the series with Jane Tranter set to serve as an executive producer, under the banner of her Bad Wolf British production company. Tranter, having taken interest in exploring why young graduates continued "flocking in their hordes" towards finance professions in the City of London after the 2008 financial crisis, secured funding from HBO for a "young and sexy" series set in the world of investment banking. A colleague introduced her to Down and Kay, themselves former investment bankers whom Tranter eventually hired to write the pilot.

In June 2019, it was announced that HBO had greenlit the series, with Lena Dunham set to direct the pilot. Principal photography began in June 2019, in Cardiff, Wales. In December 2019, it was announced that Myha'la Herrold, Marisa Abela, Harry Lawtey, David Jonsson, Nabhaan Rizwan, Freya Mavor, Will Tudor, Conor MacNeill and Ken Leung had joined the cast of the series, with Tinge Krishnan, Ed Lilly and Mary Nighy set to serve as directors, and Sam H. Freeman and Kate Verghese to serve as writers alongside Down and Kay.

In December 2020, HBO renewed the series for a second series. In July 2021, Alex Alomar Akpobome and Adam Levy were cast as new series regulars, while Indy Lewis, who guest starred in the first series, was promoted to a series regular for the second series. The second series filming wrapped on December 8, 2021. In March 2022, Jay Duplass, Sonny Poon Tip, and Katrine De Candole were cast as new series regulars for the second series.

In October 2022, HBO renewed the series for a third series. Production was not suspended amidst the WGA and SAG strikes due to the series' talent working under the UK-based union Equity. In April 2023, Kit Harington and Sarah Goldberg were cast for the third series. In May 2024, Miriam Petche, Andrew Havill, Roger Barclay, Fady Elsayed, and Fiona Button were added to the third series. Joseph Charlton, Azam Mahmood, Ally Israelson and Ava Wong Davies were added to the writer's room and served as consulting producers on the season.

In September 2024, HBO renewed the series for a fourth series. In February 2025, it was announced that Lawtey exited after the third series due to scheduling conflicts. In the same month, Max Minghella joined the fourth series. In March 2025, Kiernan Shipka, Jack Farthing, Toheeb Jimoh, Amy James-Kelly, Claire Forlani, Kal Penn and Charlie Heaton were cast for the fourth series. The fourth season began filming on March 24, 2025, and wrapped on August 1, 2025.

In February 2026, HBO renewed the series for a fifth and final season. In July 2026, Zosia Mamet was cast for the fifth and final series. On 17 August, it was announced that Cary Elwes, Dianna Agron, Sam Riley, Jessica Brown Findlay, Luke Manley, Bally Gill and Eduard Poliakov had been added as guest stars for the fifth season. On 14 September 2026, Russell Tovey and Ben Platt were cast for the fifth season. The fifth season began filming on 3 August 2026.

== Release ==
The series premiered on 9 November 2020 on HBO and HBO Max in the United States. In the United Kingdom, it premiered 10 November 2020 on BBC. The second series premiered on 1 August 2022 on HBO and premiered on BBC One on 27 September 2022. The third series premiered on 11 August 2024 on HBO. The fourth series premiered on 11 January 2026 on HBO.

== Reception ==
=== Critical response ===
Critical response of Industry
Season	Rotten Tomatoes	Metacritic
1	76% (38 reviews)	69 (17 reviews)
2	96% (25 reviews)	82 (9 reviews)
3	98% (44 reviews)	86 (19 reviews)
4	96% (51 reviews)	87 (18 reviews)

On Rotten Tomatoes, the first series holds an approval rating of 76% with an average rating of 7.7/10, based on 38 reviews. The website's critics consensus states, "Though Industry's social critiques tend toward the superficial, sharp writing and an excellent ensemble make it easy to enjoy its soapy workplace drama anyway." On Metacritic, it has a weighted average score of 69 out of 100 based on 17 reviews, indicating "generally favorable reviews".

The second series has a 96% approval rating on Rotten Tomatoes, based on 25 reviews, with an average rating of 8.1/10. The website's critics consensus reads, "Finessing complicated financial jargon into scathing repartee, Industry's stock is way up in this superlative sophomore series full of frustrated ambitions and tested loyalties." On Metacritic, it has a weighted average score of 82 out of 100 based on nine reviews, indicating "universal acclaim". Vanity Fair described the series as the "missing link" between Succession and Euphoria.

The third series holds a 98% approval rating on Rotten Tomatoes, based on 44 reviews, with an average rating of 8.8/10. The website's critics consensus states, "Finding cunning and surprising new angles to play in the Faustian rat race, Industry's ruthless third season is its best yet." On Metacritic, it has a weighted average score of 86 out of 100 based on 19 reviews, indicating "universal acclaim".

The fourth series has a 96% approval rating on Rotten Tomatoes, based on 51 reviews. The website's critics consensus reads, "Betting on its own adaptability after resetting the board and analyzing new market forces, Industry yields a handsome payout with this sterling fourth season." Metacritic, which uses a weighted average, assigned a score of 88 out of 100 based on 17 critics, indicating "universal acclaim". The Guardian described the fourth season as "truly twisted, top-tier television", highlighting it as a strong example of the series further expanding its narrative ambition and thematic scope.

=== Accolades ===
The third season of Industry was named as part of various publications' year end list of best television series of 2024. Despite acclaim from critics and audiences, many have noted the show's omission from nominations in acting (particularly of Myha'la, Abela, Leung and Harington), writing and series at the Primetime Emmy Awards. CT Jones of Rolling Stone described Industry receiving zero nominations for their fourth season at the Emmys in 2026 as "a snub we'll look back on for years to come", whilst Chris O'Falt of IndieWire likened the exclusion as a result of the series unfitting what is considered to a traditional awards season model program and criticised HBO's inability to campaign the series as "prestige TV" despite the network's reputation for high quality productions.

Year	Award	Category	Nominee(s)	Result	Ref.
2021	RTS Craft & Design Awards	Casting Award	Julie Harkin and Rae Hendrie	Won	
2021	RTS Craft & Design Awards	Photography – Drama & Comedy	Milos Moore	Won	
2023	Guild of Music Supervisors Awards	Best Music Supervision in a Television Drama	Ollie White	Nominated	
2023	British Academy Cymru Awards	Best Director: Fiction	Isabella Eklöf	Nominated	
2023	British Academy Cymru Awards	Best Sound	Industry Sound Team	Nominated	
2024	Celebration of AAPI Cinema & Television	Supporting Actor in Television	Ken Leung	Honored	
2025	Critics' Choice Awards	Best Drama Series	Industry	Nominated	
2025	RTS Programme Awards	Drama Series	Industry	Won	
2025	British Academy Television Craft Awards	Best Writer: Drama	Mickey Down and Konrad Kay	Nominated	
2025	British Academy Television Awards	Best Actress	Marisa Abela	Won	
2025	Astra TV Awards	Best Cast Ensemble in a Cable Drama Series	Industry	Nominated	
2025	TCA Awards	Outstanding Achievement in Drama	Industry	Nominated	
2026	Astra TV Awards	Best Writing in a Drama Series	Mickey Down and Konrad Kay (for "Dear Henry")	Nominated	
2026	Astra TV Awards	Best Guest Actress in a Drama Series	Kiernan Shipka	Nominated	
2026	Dorian Awards	Best TV Drama	Industry	Nominated	
2026	Dorian Awards	Best TV Performance — Drama	Marisa Abela	Nominated	
2026	Dorian Awards	Best TV Performance — Drama	Myha'la	Nominated	
2026	Dorian Awards	Best Supporting TV Performance — Drama	Ken Leung	Nominated	
2026	Black Reel Awards	Outstanding Drama Series	Industry	Nominated	
2026	Black Reel Awards	Outstanding Lead Performance in a Drama Series	Myha'la	Nominated	
2026	TCA Awards	Program of the Year	Industry	Nominated	
2026	TCA Awards	Outstanding Achievement in Drama	Industry	Nominated	
2026	TCA Awards	Individual Achievement in Drama	Marisa Abela	Nominated	
2026	TCA Awards	Individual Achievement in Drama	Myha'la	Nominated	
2026	TCA Awards	Individual Achievement in Drama	Ken Leung	Nominated	
