= Miriam Petche =

English actress

- Born: 25 May 2001 (age 25); Brighton, England
- Education: Guildhall School of Music & Drama
- Occupation: Actress
- Years active: 2012–present
- Television: Industry

Miriam Petche (/ˈpɛtʃiː/ PETCH-ee; born 25 May 2001) is a British actress. She began her career as a child actress. On television, she is known for her roles in the CBBC series The Worst Witch (2017–2018), the BBC One and HBO Max series Industry (2024–present) and the ITVX crime drama Believe Me (2026). She was named a 2026 Brit to Watch by Variety.

== Early life ==
Petche was born and raised in Brighton, East Sussex. Her father works as an editor and her mother works in education. She has a sister, who is an NHS doctor in Scotland. She studied acting at the Guildhall School of Music & Drama in London.

== Career ==
A child actress, Petche had her first acting role at the age of ten years-old in the BBC Two show Vexed. She went on to appear in children's television series The Worst Witch. She had a role in the stage play Runts in London in 2016, in which she appeared alongside Marisa Abela.

She was still studying at drama school in London when she was cast in the role of Sweetpea Golightly, a trading and sales trainee at financial institution Pierpoint & Co, in the third series of critically-acclaimed HBO Max and BBC One drama series Industry in which she appeared alongside Abela and Harry Lawtey, amongst others. She left drama school before officially graduating in order to film her scenes on location in Cardiff, Wales. Her character is ambitious with a strong work ethic and was in-part inspired by British influencer Molly-Mae Hague. She was described by Collider as the "stealth MVP" of the third series. In May 2025, she was confirmed as returning as Sweetpea for the fourth series.

In August 2025, she was cast alongside Daniel Mays and Aimee-Ffion Edwards in British true crime drama Believe Me, written by Jeff Pope for ITVX.

== Filmography ==
Year	Title	Role	Notes
2012	Vexed	Chloe	1 episode
2015	Zombies Next Door	Alys Briar	TV film
2017–2018	The Worst Witch	Esmerelda Hallow	17 episodes
2024–present	Industry	Sweetpea Golightly	8 episodes
2026	Believe Me	Carrie	Lead Role
