= Ay mamá =

2021 song by Rigoberta Bandini

Single by Rigoberta Bandini
- Language: Spanish
- Released: 23 December 2021
- Recorded: September 2021
- Genre: Electropop; dance
- Length: 3:00
- Songwriters: Paula Ribó; Esteban Navarro
- Producer: Stefano Maccarrone

Rigoberta Bandini singles chronology
"Julio Iglesias" (2021)	"Ay mamá" (2021)	"A todos mis amantes" (2022)

Music video
- "Ay mamá" on YouTube

"Ay mamá" (pronounced [aj maˈma]; American English: "Oh, mom", British English: "Oh, mum") is a song by Spanish music act Rigoberta Bandini. The song was independently released on 23 December 2021 and was a candidate to represent Spain in the 66th edition of the Eurovision Song Contest, taking part in its preselection, Benidorm Fest. Among the favourites to win, "Ay mamá" placed as the runner-up behind "SloMo" by Chanel. The song was included on Bandini's first studio album, La Emperatriz, released later in 2022.

It has performed well on the Spanish charts and music streaming services, reaching number one and winning three Song of the Year awards, and entered Spanish pop culture both as a feminist anthem and as a viral phenomenon due to its unusual staging at Benidorm Fest.

== Production and composition ==
Paula Ribó González began performing as singer-songwriter Rigoberta Bandini in 2020 after having been in several girl groups in the 2010s. Ribó performs as Rigoberta Bandini with her band composed of her partner, Esteban Navarro, and younger cousins, Juan Barenys and Memé (Belén Barenys). On "Ay mamá", Ribó and Memé provide vocals, Navarro is the keyboardist, and Barenys is their percussionist. Bandini became one of the most popular singers in Spain over the COVID-19 pandemic, with 2021 song "Perra" becoming a "feminist anthem" for its theme of vindicating femininity and for the wordplay of its title, "perra". Ribó has said that she does not only write songs about women but that femininity is a large inspiration on her work. Wiwibloggs noted that "Ay mamá" has choral verses build into an electropop chorus, which they had previously described as Bandini's particular style and something that is "anything but safe and lame" even within the context of the Eurovision Song Contest (ESC). During composition of the song, the band experimented with different synthesizer sounds, and the line "I don't know why people are so scared of our tits" was originally being recorded with a vocoder.

Ribó wrote "Ay mamá" as a tribute to her own mother, around ten years before releasing it, when she was 23; after becoming a mother herself she decided to put the song out. She composed it on the piano and began developing it for submission to Benidorm Fest, Spain's ESC preselection, eight years after originally writing it; she felt there was something special in the song and decided to develop it for the contest, adding that she "liked the demo, but [was not] in love with it" and "would withdraw if by the deadline [she] wasn't convinced about it" – she said she did love the final version. One of the more significant things she changed was the opening line. In the final version it is "You, who bled for so many months through your life", while originally it had been "You, who pulled my head out of your pussy"; Ribó changed this knowing that such explicit a lyric would not be accepted for the ESC and for wanting to make a song that could resonate with everyone from childhood to old age, later saying that she felt Spain was still a country that generally balked even at the word "tit".

According to Ribó, the song is a "feminist scream" created to "pay tribute to mothers and all women" as well as "transcending maternity", as not all women become mothers, to speak to the inherent power and unity in being a woman. With its theme of feminism, the song also denounces censorship of women's breasts and celebrates motherhood; in an interview with Spanish broadcaster RTVE, Ribó said that as well as the song criticising constant public opinions of women's bodies there is humour in the lyrics, that "[she] really [likes] writing and for [her] the lyrics are important. In this case, in addition to talking about the strength of femininity, in this case of mothers, it is a song that amuses [her]".

Liberty Leading the People, Eugène Delacroix 1830

The lyrics of the song include "Let's stop the city by taking a breast out in the style of Delacroix", referring to French artist Eugène Delacroix, who painted many nude and topless women, and specifically his artwork Liberty Leading the People. The painting depicts Liberty personified as a woman with her breasts out leading liberated people over the bodies of soldiers; the lyrics of "Ay mamá" invoke the same personification, calling for a "breast revolution". Delacroix's painting had also been censored on Facebook in 2018 for depicting female nipples. Originally, the name Delacroix was not in the lyrics, with the song having a different pre-chorus. Interviewed in 2021, Ribó said that the image of Liberty in Delacroix's painting still moves her.

== Reception and impact ==
The Heraldo de Aragón wrote in May 2022 that the song had become "one of the feminist anthems of Spain" and praised its ability to get people both dancing and thinking. In the same month, Cosmopolitan wrote that it had found more success than most songs that do represent Spain at the ESC ever achieve.

The song was chosen for the soundtrack of the Telecinco docuseries Montealto: Regreso a la casa – about Rocío Carrasco visiting the mansion of her late mother, Rocío Jurado – in January 2022. It was also used across Telecinco and other Mediaset España media from its release in 2021, including in news features produced about censorship of female nipples.

"Ay mamá", and Bandini's other music, received a boost in popularity following the Benidorm Fest appearance: in the week after Benidorm Fest, Bandini entered the global top 200 artists by streaming and downloads across major platforms at #179; "Ay mamá" was streamed over 8 million times on Spotify; and Bandini had the top two most-watched music videos and became the most-watched music artist on YouTube Spain, the first woman and third Spanish musician to achieve this. By May 2022, "Ay mamá" had been streamed over 22 million times on Spotify.

Various politicians – including government ministers – expressed their support for the song, while some conservative politicians, including the leaders of the center-right People's Party and far-right Vox, attacked the song. On 8 March 2022, during the International Women's Day marches and protests in Spain, the song was played at many of the demonstrations. The song has been politicised by different people and parties in Spain: Irene Montero, Minister of Equality, used references to the song and its lyrics to support her campaign to introduce more feminist laws for democratic equality; Congresswoman Macarena Olona has turned around the lyrics of the song in order to criticise Montero's campaign; and writer Maria de la Pau Janer published an opinion piece that used the song's title and its lyrics about menstruation to support her argument that while menstruation should be discussed and celebrated more, Spain's 2022 menstrual leave bill would result in women being passed over for jobs.

Describing 2022 as "the year of the boob" in August 2022, El Mundo wrote that Prime Minister Pedro Sánchez had threatened to pull Spain out of the ESC if broadcasters censored Ribó performing topless, should that have happened, with his cabinet supporting the idea of Ribó performing topless at Benidorm Fest.

Catalan parody sketch show Polònia performed a parody of the song in February 2022. Titled "Ay papá", it was performed by Pep Plaza imitating Felipe VI, the King of Spain, as he humorously criticises his father, Juan Carlos I, and the scandals that have landed Juan Carlos in the news in the years following his abdication and relocation to the Middle East. It also featured an imitator as Alaska, a Benidorm Fest presenter, giving frank commentary about the voting system following criticisms of Benidorm Fest's votes. Spanish music comedy duo Los Morancos recorded a parody called "Ay Omá" lampooning the state of health services in Spain, particularly for older women. The viral Benidorm Fest performance of "Ay mamá" was recreated by Susi Caramelo on Tu cara me suena during the week of the Eurovision Song Contest 2023.

== Accolades ==
Accolades
Year	Organisation	Award	Result	Ref(s).
2022	Premios MIN	Radio 3 Song of the Year Award	Won	
2022	Premios MIN	Best Original Lyrics	Nominated	
2022	Premis RAC105	Best Song	Won (Note: La Vanguardia wrote that the jury voted unanimously to award "Ay mamá" Best Song.)	
2022	Premios +Músicas	Best Song	Won	
2022	Premios +Músicas	Best Pop Record	Won	
2022	iCat	Best Song Not in Catalan	Won	
2023	Premios MIN	Best Video	Won	

== Chart performance ==
It reached number one on the Spanish charts on 28 January 2022, becoming the first song that failed to represent Spain at the ESC to top the country's chart since "Lo Malo" by Aitana and Ana Guerra in 2018. The song received a platinum certification by PROMUSICAE on 1 March. After debuting in the top 100 in December 2021, it spent 36 continuous weeks on the chart, leaving in the first week of September 2022. It re-entered the top 100 in the second week of October 2022 upon the release of the album La Emperatriz, on which it features.

== Cover art ==
The single's cover art depicts the tarot card of The Empress from the Major Arcana of the Tarot of Marseilles cards. Ribó explained that the card is a symbol of freedom and feminine power, and a card she has felt a connection to.

== Music video ==
Select images in the music video for "Ay mamá"

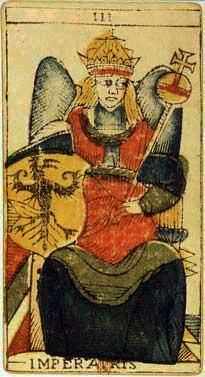
A c.1701–1715 Tarot of Marseilles Empress card; the card appears in the music video and is the basis for the song's cover art.

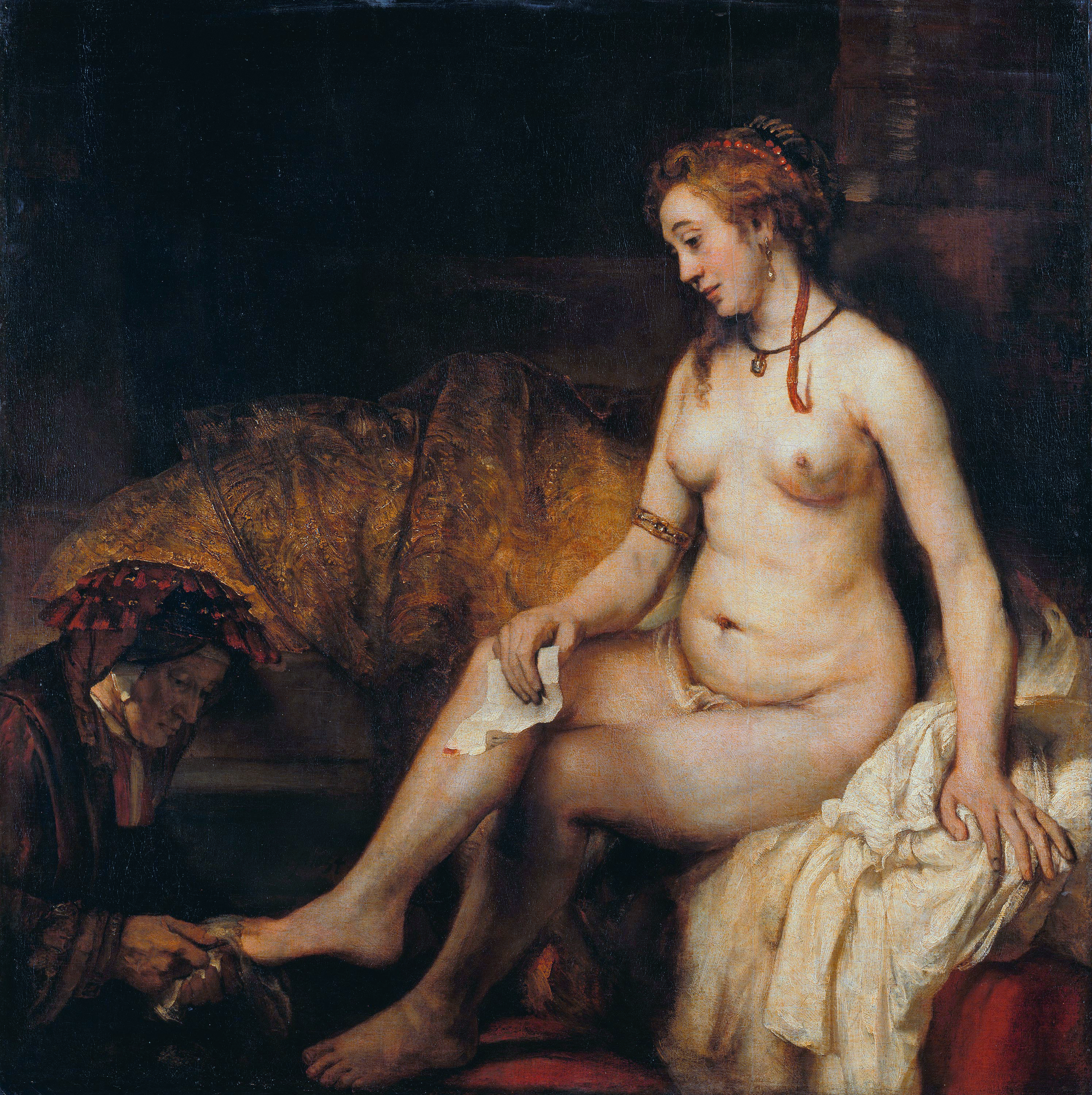
Bathsheba with King David's Letter, Rembrandt 1654, is the first of many instances of classic Western artworks depicting women that are used in the music video.

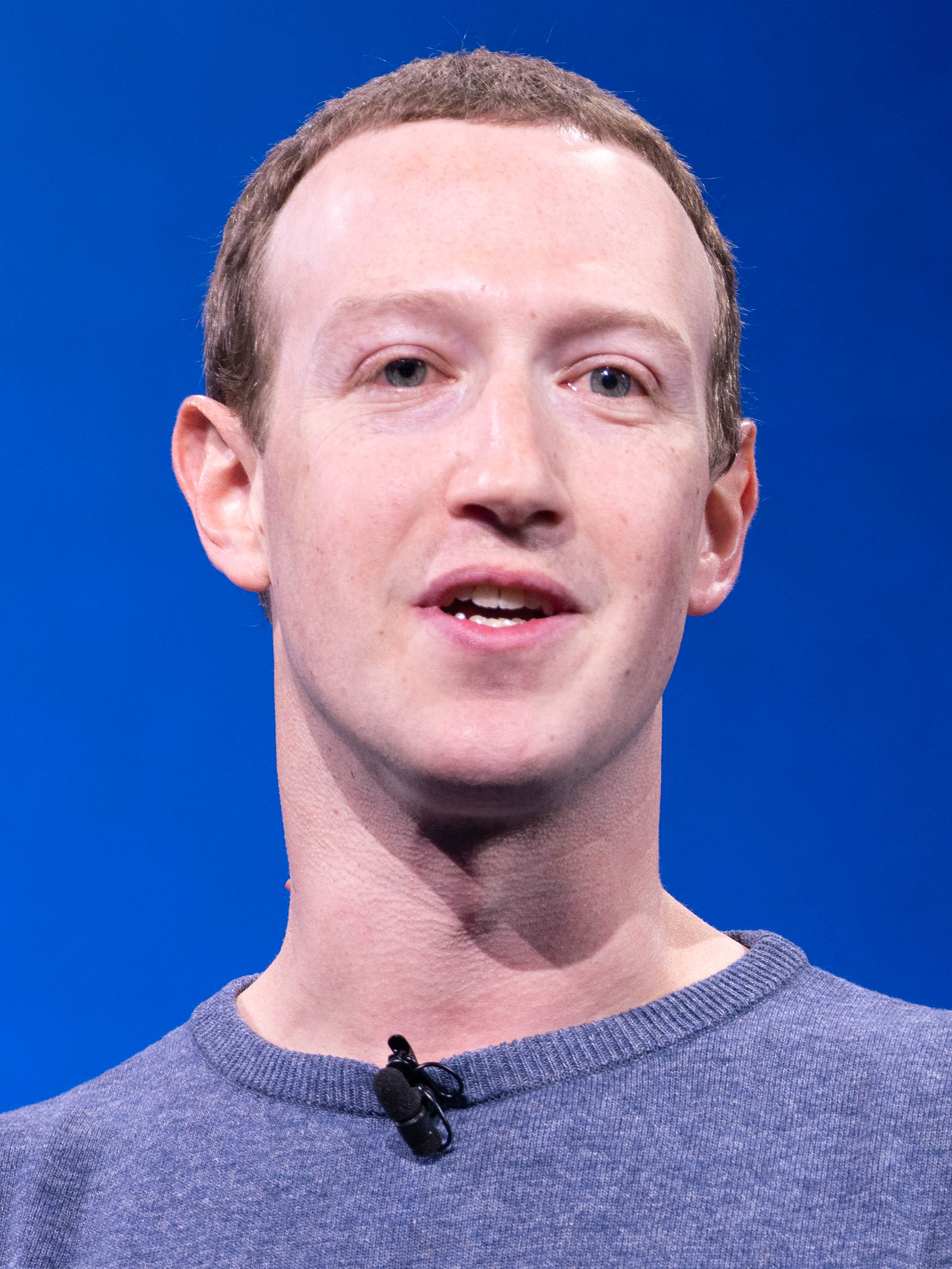
Mark Zuckerberg (photographed in 2019) is depicted as a villainous nipple-scanning spaceship in the music video.

The music video for "Ay mamá" was released on 1 May 2022, coinciding with the celebration of Mother's Day in Spain. Developing the music video began as soon as the group returned from Benidorm Fest; the ideas were very ambitious in terms of production so creating the video would take some time. Ribó felt that taking the time to create a more impressive video was worthwhile, as the song was sustaining its popularity on its own. They did not initially plan to release the music video on Mother's Day but after being in post-production for a month the timing coincided to do so. It was directed by Salvador Sunyer, whom Ribó chose to work with because she knew he could find the right balance of "humour, poetry, beauty and femininity". Sunyer had "carte blanche in artistic terms" control over the video. By the time of the music video's release, the video of the song's performance in the grand final of Benidorm Fest had over 7.5 million views on YouTube. At the premiere of the music video, Ribó said that "it's not a great story, but there are very beautiful images", and that it is funny, which she liked.

It depicts Ribó trying to compose a song without disturbing her young child. While doing so, she notices a photo of her mother and imagines herself embodying all women from prehistory to the far future when women have four arms and fly. In this future, a spaceship shaped like a sphinx with Mark Zuckerberg's head, with a Meta logo on its forehead, approaches a pink planet with a prominent volcano, which looks like a spherical breast and its nipple. The nipple then shoots a laser beam and explodes the Zuckerberg ship. At the end of the video, Ribó's son wakes in the music studio, and she rushes to comfort him.

According to costume designer Pau Aulí, who had three weeks to conceptualise the costumes before shooting, the different eras of women's history in the video are marked by different outfits as well as the settings, with each outfit also being symbolic of an aspect of feminism in some way: in prehistory, Ribó and the dancers are naked and covered in mud to indicate freedom; in recent history, Ribó wears a corset and hoop skirt with a powdered face, showing oppressive women's fashion; and in the far future, the women are metallic to show resilience. Some of the costume choices represent the hymen and vulva.

Other allusions to women's history in the video include some of the images surrounding Ribó before she sees the photo of her mother – including a Tarot of Marseilles Empress card, an image of the Hindu goddess Durga, and an image of Rembrandt's painting Bathsheba with King David's Letter – and a gallery of depictions of breasts, motherhood, and femininity through art history in a creative sequence set in the dome of the Pantheon. The Delacroix painting mentioned in the lyrics, Liberty Leading the People, also appears in the music video, with Ribó's head superimposed on Liberty. The inclusion of the Zuckerberg ship, which also resembles the Imperial Star Destroyer from Star Wars, being destroyed by a giant breast is a condemnation of his company's social networks censoring female nipples.

Seven Free the Nipple campaigners were hired to appear in the music video, topless, showing different appearances of breasts. None of the footage of "real breasts" was included in the final video and the only breasts shown in the video not as part of artworks were those of Ribó and the dancers covered in mud as prehistoric women. Sunyer, who had artistic control of the final cut, said that there was no censorship intended in removing the footage and that he made the decision to cut it for artistic reasons only, saying that the footage did not work with the rest of the video. Another nipple freedom group, Femen, had been approached to participate but did not do so, with the group blaming the video production team; Sunyer says that they had been asked because some of the video ideas resembled Femen's protests, and he did not want to be seen as plagiarising, but he ultimately decided not to involve Femen as the group wanted artistic control of their appearance in it. The Free the Nipple activists were told before the music video was released that they had been cut, and they were still credited. Sunyer also suggested that some of the cut footage, which includes a natural birth, may be used in a music video for "Ay mamá (Génesis)". After the video was released, one of the activists used social media to express her disappointment in the creative direction of the video, which she said they all felt had potential to carry a more powerful message, as well as the fact the decisions were made by men, noting that their complaints were not directed at Bandini.

== Live performances ==
The first live performance of the song was in Logroño at the Riojaforum concert in January 2022, during which Ribó and Memé performed topless during parts of the song. They repeated this at other concerts following Benidorm Fest. At Festival Ítaca in L'Estartit in June 2022, the group was joined by a giant puppet with a breast exposed, also called Rigoberta, from Geganters de la Bisbal d'Empordà, which was dancing in the audience. This also served as part of the giant Rigoberta's 40th anniversary celebrations in the area.

=== Benidorm Fest ===
As Bandini's popularity grew in 2021, Wiwibloggs wrote that she was "one of the hottest names in Spain's music industry" and said she would be the dream artist to represent them at the Eurovision Song Contest 2022; interviewed by EFE, Ribó said she would consider taking part but may wait for a future edition. In December 2021, "Ay mamá" was among the fourteen candidates selected by RTVE to participate in Benidorm Fest in January 2022 for a chance to represent Spain in the Eurovision Song Contest 2022, with the broadcaster saying after the Benidorm Fest semi-finals that the performance had everything needed to succeed at the ESC. Shortly before Benidorm Fest, "Ay mamá" entered Spotify's global top 50 viral songs.

The grand final staging of the last part of the song, with the giant breast globe

It placed first in its semi-final, receiving the top votes from both the jury and the public and receiving the most combined points across both semi-finals with 111 (one point ahead of Chanel and her song "SloMo" with 110), though Ribó had performed with sinusitis. It then competed in the grand final, with its staging "not leaving anyone indifferent"; the performance featured, towards the end of the song, a large spherical breast. Prior to Benidorm Fest, Ribó wrote on Twitter that "the boob will be so big that we won't fit on stage". The giant boob was created by Marina Salazar. Ribó was dressed initially in an outfit reminiscent of a wedding dress with sunglasses before removing these and the veil and, later, stripping down to a nude suit; she had asked the costume designer for outfits with impact, that "go from chastity to animality", and said in other circumstances she would have stripped completely at the end. The sunglasses were a suggestion from Juan Barenys, with Ribó saying it was a detail that took some of the pressure off by adding some lightness to the early staging. RTVE described the staging as "fresh, innocent, and full of symbolism". Ribó also had issues when performing in the grand final, as her in-ear piece stopped working partway through the song. Two additional dancers, María Isabel (Mabel) Olea and Marta Ros, joined the four performers at the competition; among other dancers, both also appeared in the music video. La Vanguardia said that the combination of the song's powerful lyrics and the staging in the grand final made it go viral.

In the grand final, the Galician-language song "Terra" by Tanxugueiras won the public and demoscopic (panel representative of the Spanish demographics) votes, the former by a landslide, with "Ay mamá" and "SloMo" filling out the top three in both; "Terra" performed poorly in the jury vote, however, which was instead dominated by the other two songs. Ultimately, "Ay mamá" placed second overall, ahead of "Terra" in third and behind winner "SloMo", which then came third at the ESC.

Ribó congratulated Chanel after she won, even as the obscure televoting system of the national selection and Chanel's win over Bandini and Tanxugueiras drew criticism in the media and saw four government ministers make official requests for RTVE to release full details of the votes. Both Bandini and Tanxugueiras asked fans to accept the result; Ribó said she knew ESC fans would have preferred her or Tanxugueiras to win but that she felt uncomfortable that the crowds in Benidorm were chanting for her when Chanel was announced the winner. She later told HuffPost that she realised she was not destined to win the competition, adding: "going to Eurovision would be super fun, but I prefer that my song has become a part of society". In April 2022, "Ay mamá" was voted the best non-winning song from a national final by ESC fan website escgo!'s annual SongHunt contest. It was also chosen to represent Spain in the 2022 OGAE Second Chance Contest, in which it came third.

== Credits and personnel ==
=== Song ===
- Paula Ribó González – writer, (Note: As part of Rigoberta Bandini) lead vocals, music publisher
- Esteban Navarro Dordal – writer, background vocals, keyboardist, producer, composition
- Belén Barenys González – lead and background vocals
- Juan Barenys González – background vocals, percussionist
- Stefano Maccarrone – producer, composition

=== Video ===
- Salvador Sunyer – director, original idea
- Josep Prat Sorolla – original idea, creative director
- Paula Ribó González – original idea
- Pepe Gay de Liébana – cinematography
- Martí Blanché – editor
- Susana Ripa – producer
- Mañana – production company
- Limp – post-production
- Dolby Atmos – sound

Credits and personnel adapted from music video and single video.

== Charts and certifications ==
Chart performance for "Ay mamá"
Chart (2022)	Peak position	Certifications
Spain (PROMUSICAE)	1	PROMUSICAE: 2× Platinum

Year-end chart performance for "Ay mamá"
Chart (2022)	Position
Spanish Singles (PROMUSICAE)	34

== Other versions ==
On 27 April 2022, Bandini released "Ay mamá (Génesis)", the version of the song that was originally submitted to Benidorm Fest. Ribó decided to release this version because it "really is nothing like ["Ay mamá"]. They have many parts in common but it's another song with its own identity, so [the band] were excited. It was more than anything the desire to share that kind of draft notebook." The Génesis version includes many more lyrics than the original single.

Bilbao-based musicians Krusak and Xabier Iriarte collaborated to record a Basque cover of the song in April 2022, "Ene ama", which also became popular. In a viral video on YouTube, Instagram and TikTok, Spanish singer Mario Jefferson performed the song while imitating famous Latin music artists' voices, propelling him to fame as one of Spain's new generation of imitators.

On 13 May 2022, the song was performed by contestant Scorpio on the Catalan singing competition show Eufòria, with a mural projection of images of women breastfeeding shown behind.

Ribó is an ambassador for the Levi's Music Project; between March and May 2022, they ran a competition for fans and music producers to download the song elements of "Ay mamá" and remix the song. The Levi's Music Project collaborations intend to inspire creativity, and after the remixes were submitted Ribó chose her favourites and held a live feedback session with the creators on Discord.

A cover version by Azúcar Moreno was released in April 2023; the group had represented Spain in the Eurovision Song Contest 1990 and also competed in Benidorm Fest 2022.

== See also ==
- List of number-one singles of 2022 (Spain)
