= Jotei =

Jotei is rōmaji, a romanization of words in the Japanese language. It may refer to:

- empress (Japanese: 女帝, じょてい, jotei)
- The Empress, a tarot card
- Shangdi or God (上帝, じょうてい, Jōtei)
