= La Emperatriz =

Studio album by Rigoberta Bandini
- Released: 7 October 2022
- Recorded: 2020–2022
- Genre: Electropop; EDM; dance-pop
- Length: 41:38

La Emperatriz (English: The Empress) is the debut studio album by Spanish music act Rigoberta Bandini, released independently in October 2022 during an extended tour.

== Background ==
Early in the summer of 2022, Paula Ribó, frontwoman of Rigoberta Bandini, announced that the act would take a hiatus from their continuous touring after the summer, and would also release an album by the end of the year. The album was released on 7 October 2022, with the last planned date of the tour at the Palau Sant Jordi on 24 November (not including a Christmas concert on 23 December).

Ribó had contented herself with releasing only singles in the first few years of her career as Rigoberta Bandini, but in March 2022, after being thrust into the national spotlight with the popularity of "Ay mamá", she "felt the need to frame all the songs that [she] had created" in a way to help her compartmentalise eras of her career.

The title La Emperatriz (The Empress) refers to the tarot card The Empress, which was used as the cover art for "Ay mamá". Ribó has described her connection to the card on several occasions, and said that the symbols of the card also reflect her journey as an artist since the start of Rigoberta Bandini.

== Music ==
Twelve songs feature on the album, eight of which are previously released popular singles. The four new songs are "Canciones de Amor a Ti", "Tú y Yo", "Que Vivir Sea un Jardín" and "La Emperatriz". The new songs continue Ribó's themes of motherhood and feminism in her music. Ribó said that the connecting thread of the songs is simply what she would like her artistic legacy to be if she were to suddenly disappear. While Rigoberta Bandini's music is typically electronic dance in genre, La Vanguardia wrote that the new songs do not initially seem to make the listener want to get up and dance, with Ribó agreeing that after the dancing she had wanted to create more intimate music.

The song "Tú y yo" was written when Ribó caught COVID-19 over Christmas when her son was six months old, and had to isolate without him.

Most of the songs were produced by Ribó, Esteban Navarro, and Estefano Macarrone. "Too Many Drugs" and "La Emperatriz" were produced by Santos & Fluren.

== Release ==
Though Rigoberta Bandini received several offers to sign with a record label, including some which Ribó described as "economically interesting", they preferred to have creative freedom and control, and released the album independently.

== Track listing ==
No.	Title	Length
1.	"In Spain We Call It Soledad"	2:56
2.	"Ay mamá"	3:01
3.	"Perra"	3:38
4.	"Canciones de Amor a Ti"	3:19
5.	"Julio Iglesias"	3:59
6.	"A Todos Mis Amantes"	2:58
7.	"Así Bailaba" (with Amaia)	3:30
8.	"Que Cristo Baje"	3:54
9.	"Tú y Yo"	3:07
10.	"Too Many Drugs"	5:29
11.	"Que Vivir Sea un Jardín"	1:39
12.	"La Emperatriz"	4:08
Total length:		41:38

== Charts ==
=== Weekly charts ===
Weekly chart performance for La Emperatriz
Chart	Peak position
Spanish Albums (PROMUSICAE)	5
Spanish Vinyl (PROMUSICAE)	4

=== Year-end charts ===
2022 year-end chart performance for La Emperatriz
Chart (2022)	Position
Spanish Albums (PROMUSICAE)	90

2023 year-end chart performance for La Emperatriz
Chart (2023)	Position
Spanish Albums (PROMUSICAE)	64
