= Belén Barenys =

Spanish actress and singer (born 1999)

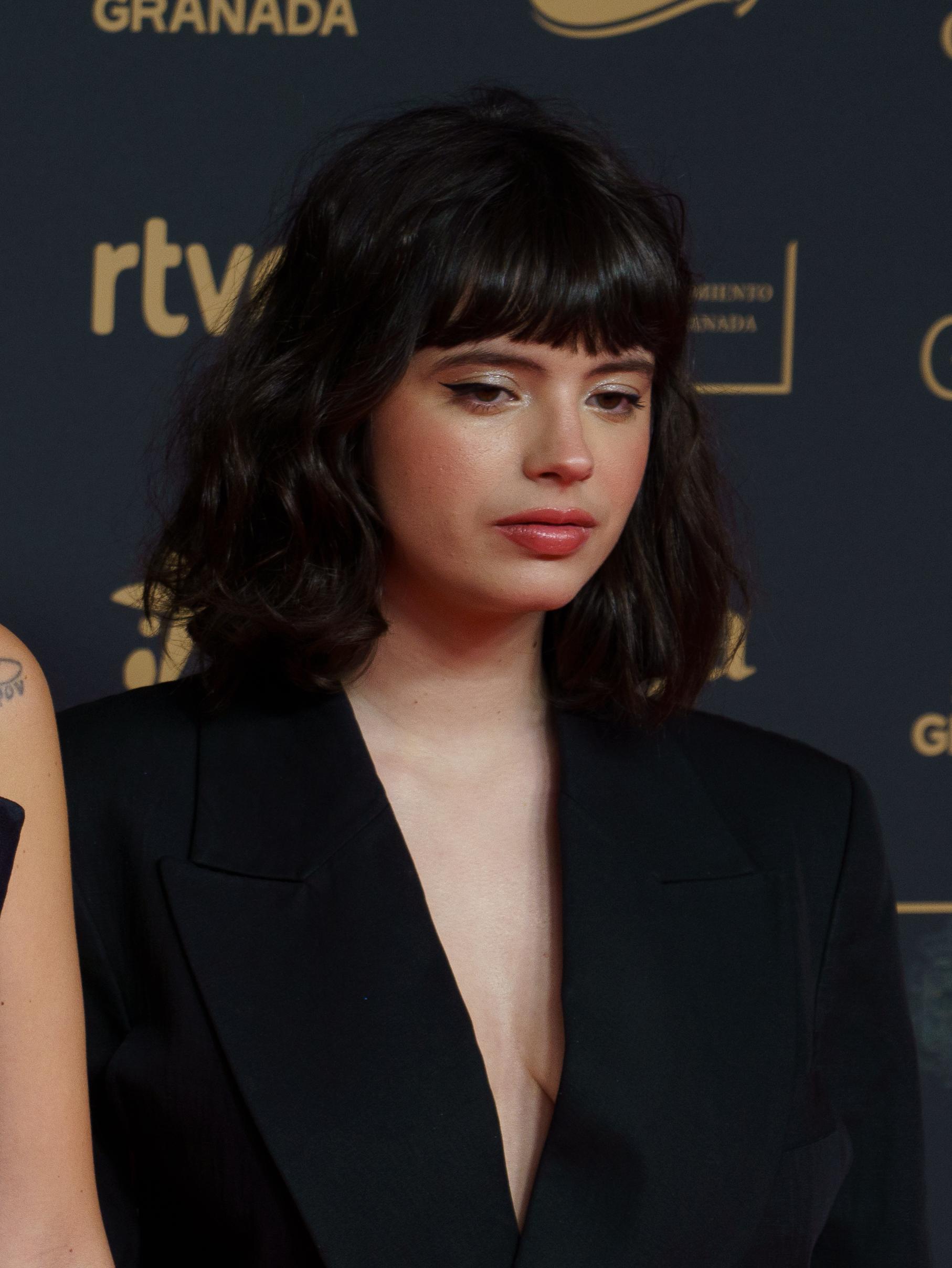
- Barenys in 2025
- Born: Mari Belén Barenys González; 28 November 1999 (age 26); Barcelona, Catalonia, Spain
- Occupations: Singer; actress
- Years active: 2003; 2009–2015; 2019–present
- Children: 1
- Family: Paula Ribó (cousin)
- Musical career
- Genres: Alternative dance; hyperpop; rap
- Instruments: Vocals

Mari Belén Barenys González, known as Belén Barenys (Catalan: [bɛˈlem bəˈɾɛɲs]; born 28 November 1999), is a Spanish actress and singer, sometimes known by her stage name Memé (Catalan: [meˈme]). Having performed as a dubbing actress since childhood, she rose to prominence as part of the group Rigoberta Bandini. She co-created and stars in the Filmin series Autodefensa.

== Career ==
Barenys began dubbing roles in 2003, when she provided additional voices for the Catalan release of Brother Bear. In 2009, she also began voicing films in Spanish, with two roles in the dub of The Imaginarium of Doctor Parnassus. The next year, she dubbed the voice of Princess Elizabeth in The King's Speech into both Spanish and Catalan. She continued dubbing through 2015, providing voices in one or both languages for films including Up, Brave, Frozen, Cloud Atlas, Maleficent, and as Riley in Inside Out. She first acted live in the 2019 series El muerto vivo.

In 2020, Barenys and her brother joined their cousin, Paula Ribó, in the musical project Rigoberta Bandini; they began performing live shows as a group in 2021. The siblings joined Ribó (as did Ribó's partner) when she realised she needed a band, turning to her family as she had composed music with Barenys since they were young. In March 2021, Ribó and Barenys performed their popular single "Perra" at the 13th Gaudí Awards. At the end of this year, they released the single "Ay mamá", with which they competed in Benidorm Fest 2022 for a chance to represent Spain in the Eurovision Song Contest later that year. The single went viral and reached number one in Spain.

In early 2022, Barenys started her own music project, with the stage name Memé. This name was a childhood nickname, from her brother unable to say her name correctly when they were young. ABC noted that the stage name is somewhat reminiscent of the lyrics of "Ay mamá", but that fans of Rigoberta Bandini would recognise her from the performances. She sang and rapped on the song "KSA" (by group Habla de mí en presente) as featured artist, released in January 2022 on Habla de mí en presente's album Vivir más. Mondo Sonoro wrote that KSA had "crazy rhythms" and imagination, showing that "with a good base, you can make any lyrics into a hit". In March 2022, she released her first solo single, a hyperpop song called "La contraseña del Gmail" that was considered likely divisive because of its irreverent lyrics and tone. Barenys explained that the song was about sad things, so she put it to an upbeat track so she could "dance to her own shit".

In November 2022, Filmin premiered their third in-house production, Autodefensa, an irreverent sitcom co-created by and starring Barenys and close friend Berta Prieto. After Barenys and Prieto recorded a video about a trip in Peñíscola while intoxicated and shared it on Instagram, saying it should be a Filmin documentary, director Miguel Ángel Blanca approached them to create the series. It was nominated for two Feroz Awards in 2023, including one for Barenys, Prieto, and Blanca with Best Screenplay for a Series. El Mundo described Autodefensa and Barenys' first two singles as Memé as transgressive and "certainly not suitable for boomers."

== Personal life ==
Barenys studied philosophy at university but dropped out in her second year to pursue acting full-time. She has a daughter.

== Discography ==
=== Singles ===
List of singles (as MEMÉ)
Title	Year	Album
"KSA" (Habla de mí en presente feat. MEMÉ)	2022	Vivir más
"La contraseña del Gmail"	2022	Non-album singles
"Mátame"	2022	Non-album singles

== Filmography ==
=== Television ===
Year	Title	Role	Notes
2019	El muerto vivo		1 episode
2022	Autodefensa	Belén / Cristo	Also co-creator and co-writer
