= Daddy, I'm a Zombie =

Spanish animated movie

- Film poster
- Spanish: Papá, Soy una Zombi
- Directed by: Ricardo Ramón; Joan Espinach
- Written by: Daniel Torres
- Produced by: Alberto Gerrikabeitia
- Starring: Paula Ribó; Núria Trifol; Ivan Labanda; Luis Posada; Roser Batalla; Clara Schwarze
- Cinematography: Ricardo Ramón
- Music by: Manel Gil-Inglada
- Production companies: Abra Producciones; Digital Dreams Films
- Distributed by: Lionsgate Home Entertainment (United Kingdom/Ireland); Phase 4 Films (North America)
- Release date: November 25, 2011 (Gijón International Film Festival)
- Running time: 80 minutes
- Country: Spain
- Languages: Catalan; English; Basque; Spanish; French

Daddy, I'm a Zombie (Spanish: Papá, soy una Zombi) is a 2011 Spanish animated comedy-drama film directed by Joan Espinach and Ricardo Ramón. The film premiered 25 November 2011 at the Gijón Film Festival in Spain. Spanish actress Paula Ribó voiced the main character of Dixie and Kimberly Wharton voiced the character in its English adaptation.

== Plot ==
The film follows Dixie Grim, a thirteen-year-old gothic girl. Her father is a recently divorced mortician who tries to connect with his daughter, but she seems to want nothing to do with him. She has a giant crush on Ray, a boy in school who doesn't seem to know she exists. All goes wrong when she witnesses her former best friend Julia seemingly flirting with Ray. Heartbroken, she runs away from the scene. Shortly after, a tree falls in a forest and seemingly kills her.

Dixie wakes up in a graveyard and discovers that she has become a zombie. She befriends an Egyptian mummy named Isis and finds that she can wield the Azoth, a powerful magic amulet. The two are curious to try out and control its power, as it is capable of returning a zombie to the moment before their death, and decide to find another zombie to use as a test subject. Along the way they meet Gonner, a zombie pirate who charms Dixie, but later steals her necklace, breaking her heart and tearing apart her body in the process. She is also separated from Isis. Unbeknownst to Dixie and Isis, Gonner had only stolen the Azoth to protect her from the evil witch Nebulosa.

Dixie is put back together by a friendly zombie named Vitriol, who reluctantly takes her to Nebulosa. Reaching the witch requires that she go through a carnival funhouse where she must face her pain and fears, which Dixie manages to overcome. She also reconciles with and rescues Gonner from Nebulosa's apprentice Piroska after overhearing him admit that he truly loved her. Dixie also recovers the Azoth and with Gonner, they find Isis with Nebulosa, who is threatening to destroy her. After destroying Piroska, Dixie manages to unintentionally open a portal that allows the three to escape Nebulosa's clutches. Dixie wakes up to find herself alive. She initially believes that everything was a dream, but thinks otherwise after learning that Isis and Gonner did actually exist. Isis managed to live and married King Tut, while Gonner gave up piracy to become a poet. Gonner truly wished to fulfill his dreams with Dixie. Dixie resumes her life with a new positive outlook.

== Voice actors ==
=== Spanish release ===
- Paula Ribó as Dixie Malasombra
- Núria Trifol as Isis, Julia
- Ivan Labanda as Gonner
- Luis Posada as Ricardo Malasombra, Vitriol
- Roser Batalla as Nigreda / Sofía Malasombra
- Clara Schwarze as Brianna, Lilianna
- Elisabeth Bergalló as Piroska
- Albert Mieza as Fizcko
- Manuel Osto as History Professor
- Francesc Belda as Thorko

=== English release ===
- Cristina Vee as Dixie Grim
- Keke Palmer as Isis
- Bryce Papenbrook as Gonner
- Hayden Panettiere as Sophia Grim
- Doug Gochman as Phil Grim, Vitriol
- Karen McCarthy as Nebulosa
- Liz Joseph as Piroska
- Heather Downey as Allyssa
- Tracey Charles as Melissa, Julia
- Danny Katiana as Frizcko, Thorko
- Josh Snyder as History Teacher

== Recognition ==
=== Reception ===
Starburst Magazine panned the film overall, stating that although the film did have good music and cinematography, that overall it "isn't funny, it isn't frightening and every set-piece action scene is a dismal failure." Common Sense Media was somewhat more positive, rating it at three out of five stars.

=== Awards and nominations ===
- 2012, won 'Enfants Terribles Award' at Gijón International Film Festival
- 2012, Goya Awards nomination for 'Best Animated Film'
- 2013, Gaudí Awards nomination for 'Best Animated Feature'
- 2013, El Círculo de Escritores Cinematográficos (Cinema Writers Circle Awards, Spain) nomination for 'Best Animated Film'

== Sequel ==
A sequel entitled Mummy, I'm a Zombie (Spanish: Mamá, soy un zombi) which had a later Spanish re-titling to Dixie y la rebelión zombi (English: Dixie and the Zombie Rebellion), was given a theatrical release on 7 November 2014 in Spain. Kim Wharton returned to voice Dixie for its English release.
