= Paula Ribó dubbing filmography =

Paula Ribó is a Spanish voice actress and musician, who has dubbed over 300 films and television shows into Peninsular Spanish and Catalan. Starting as a child actress, she has continued voicing child characters.

Among her animated roles, she voices two Disney Princesses: Merida in Spanish and Catalan and Anna in Catalan. She also voices Poppy in the Trolls franchise; Margo in the Despicable Me franchise; and voiced Chihiro in the Spanish and Catalan versions of Spirited Away. On television, she voiced the lead role of Caillou in Caillou for most of its Spanish and Catalan run, switching to Caillou's younger sister towards the end. Dubbing live-action, Ribó has voiced three characters from the Harry Potter franchise in Catalan: Ginny Weasley for the first six movies; Hermione Grainger in the seventh movie; and Chastity Barebone in the Fantastic Beasts and Where to Find Them spin-off. She has dubbed into Spanish the young Harriet Vanger in all adaptations of Stieg Larsson's Millennium trilogy. In the Twilight saga she dubbed the voice of Angela Weber.

Ribó is or has been the habitual Peninsular Spanish and/or Catalan dubbing voice of Abigail Breslin, Dakota and Elle Fanning, Rachel Hurd-Wood, Anna Kendrick, Chloë Grace Moretz, Liliana Mumy, Hayden Panettiere, AnnaSophia Robb, Emma Roberts, Hailee Steinfeld, Emma Stone, Emma Watson, and Shailene Woodley.

Roles all sourced to El Doblaje (Spanish) and El Doblatge (Catalan) unless cited inline.

== Animation ==
=== Film ===
Year	Title	Role	Language(s)	Notes
	White Fang	Young White Fang	Peninsular Spanish	Originally released in 1997
1998	A Bug's Life	Princess Dot	Peninsular Spanish	
2000	Dinosaur	Suri	Catalan, Peninsular Spanish	
2000	Toy Story 2	Amy	Peninsular Spanish	
2001	The Emperor's New Groove	Chaca	Catalan	
2001	Momo	Momo	Peninsular Spanish	
2001	Monsters, Inc.		Peninsular Spanish	Additional voices
2002	The Hunchback of Notre Dame II		Peninsular Spanish	Additional voices
2002	Lilo & Stitch	Lilo Pelekai	Catalan	
2002	Spirited Away	Chihiro Ogino	Catalan, Peninsular Spanish	
2003	Robin Hood	Tagalong	Catalan	1973 film dubbed in 2003
2004	Akira	Kiyoko (No. 25)	Peninsular Spanish	1988 film dubbed for 2004 DVD
2004	The Incredibles	Violet Parr	Catalan	
2004	The Polar Express	Hero Girl	Peninsular Spanish	
2005	The Princess and the Pea	Young Prince Rollo	Peninsular Spanish	2002 film dubbed in 2005
2006	Ice Age: The Meltdown	Beaver	Catalan, Peninsular Spanish	Also additional voices; Beaver only in Peninsular Spanish dub
2007	Rayearth	Umi Ryuuzaki	Peninsular Spanish	1997 anime movie dubbed in 2007
2007	Surf's Up	Lani Aliikai	Catalan, Peninsular Spanish	
2008	3×3 Eyes	Yoko Ayanokoji	Peninsular Spanish	1990s anime film dubbed for 2008 DVD
2008	The Matrix Revolutions	Sati	Catalan	2003 film dubbed in 2008
2008	The Sky Crawlers	Mizuki Kusanagi	Peninsular Spanish	
2010	Despicable Me	Margo	Catalan	
2010	Fate/stay night	Rin Tohsaka	Peninsular Spanish	
2010	Legend of the Guardians: The Owls of Ga'Hoole	Pete	Peninsular Spanish	
2011	Barbie: Princess Charm School	Delancy	Peninsular Spanish	
2012	Brave	Merida	Catalan, Peninsular Spanish	
2012	Ice Age: Continental Drift	Steffie	Catalan, Peninsular Spanish	
2013	The Croods	Eep Crood	Catalan, Peninsular Spanish	
2013	Despicable Me 2	Margo	Catalan	
2013	Epic	Mary Katherine "M.K." Bomba	Peninsular Spanish	
2013	Frozen	Anna	Catalan	
2013	Khumba	Tombi	Peninsular Spanish	
2014	Big Hero 6	Honey Lemon	Catalan	
2016	Trolls	Poppy	Catalan, Peninsular Spanish	
2016	Zootopia	Judy Hopps	Catalan, Peninsular Spanish	
2017	Despicable Me 3	Margo	Peninsular Spanish	
2018	Ralph Breaks the Internet	Merida, Anna	Catalan, Peninsular Spanish	Reprised voice roles of Merida and Anna in Catalan, Merida in Peninsular Spanish
2019	Frozen II	Anna	Catalan	
2020	The Croods: A New Age	Eep Crood	Catalan, Peninsular Spanish	
2020	Trolls World Tour	Poppy	Peninsular Spanish	
2021	Sing 2	Porscha Crystal	Catalan, Peninsular Spanish	
2024	Inside Out 2	Envy		As Rigoberta Bandini
2025	Zootopia 2	Judy Hopps	Catalan, Peninsular Spanish	

=== Television ===
Year	Title	Role	Language(s)	Notes
2001	Lloyd in Space	Francine Nebulon	Peninsular Spanish	Main role
1997–2003	Caillou	Caillou, Rosita	Peninsular Spanish	Voiced Caillou until 2002 and Rosita between 2002 and 2003
2003	Kim Possible: A Sitch in Time	Kim Possible (age 6)	Peninsular Spanish	TV movie
2006	One Piece	Soran	Catalan	
2009	Nouky & Friends	Lola	Peninsular Spanish	
2017	Trolls Holiday	Poppy	Peninsular Spanish	Television special
2018	Trolls: The Beat Goes On!	Poppy	Peninsular Spanish	Main role

=== Video games ===
Year	Title	Role	Language(s)	Notes
1999	A Bug's Life	Princess Dot	Peninsular Spanish	
2013	Elsword	Ara	Peninsular Spanish	
2014	Disney Infinity 2.0	Merida	Peninsular Spanish	

== Live-action ==
=== Film ===
Year	Title	Role	Language(s)	Notes
	Summer of '42	Miriam	Catalan	Originally released in 1971, dubbed later
	Free Willy 2: The Adventure Home	Nadine	Catalan	Originally released in 1995
2000	The Watcher	Jessica	Catalan	
2001	102 Dalmatians		Peninsular Spanish	Additional voices
2001	A Beautiful Mind	Marcee	Peninsular Spanish	
2001	A Knight's Tale	Christiana	Catalan	
2001	Donnie Darko	Samantha Darko	Catalan	
2001	Dr. T & the Women	Lacey	Peninsular Spanish	
2001	Halloweentown II: Kalabar's Revenge	Sophie Piper	Peninsular Spanish	
2001	Harry Potter and the Philosopher's Stone	Ginny Weasley	Catalan	
2001	K-PAX	Natalie Powell	Peninsular Spanish	
2001	The Patriot	Susan Martin	Peninsular Spanish	
2001	The Pledge	Chrissy	Peninsular Spanish	
2001	Rat Race	Kimberly Pear	Peninsular Spanish	
2001	Say Nothing	Casey	Peninsular Spanish	
2002	Divine Secrets of the Ya-Ya Sisterhood	Young Vivi Abbott	Catalan	
2002	Far from Heaven	Janice Whitaker	Peninsular Spanish	
2002	Harry Potter and the Chamber of Secrets	Ginny Weasley	Catalan	
2002	The Hours	Young Richard Brown	Peninsular Spanish	
2002	I Am Sam	Lucy Diamond Dawson	Peninsular Spanish	
2002	In America	Ariel Sullivan	Peninsular Spanish	
2002	Evelyn	Maurice Doyle	Peninsular Spanish	
2002	Rabbit-Proof Fence	Daisy Kadibil	Peninsular Spanish	
2002	The Santa Clause 2	Lucy Miller	Peninsular Spanish	
2002	Signs	Bo Hess	Peninsular Spanish	
2002	Spy Kids 2: The Island of Lost Dreams	Gerti Giggles	Peninsular Spanish	
2002	Sweet Home Alabama	Young Melanie	Peninsular Spanish	
2002	Trapped	Abigail "Abbie" Jennings	Peninsular Spanish	
2002	The Tree, the Mayor and the Mediatheque	Zoé Rossignol	Peninsular Spanish	1993 film dubbed for 2002 DVD release
2003	Anger Management	Sara Plowman	Peninsular Spanish	
2003	Cheaper by the Dozen	Jessica Baker	Peninsular Spanish	
2003	The Children of the Marshland	Young Cri Cri	Catalan	1999 film dubbed in 2003
2003	Darkness Falls	Young Caitlin	Peninsular Spanish	
2003	Dark Water	Ikuko Matsubara (age 6)	Peninsular Spanish	
2003	Endangered Species	Kathleen Sullivan	Peninsular Spanish	
2003	The Gathering	Emma Kirkman	Peninsular Spanish	
2003	The Jungle Book 2	Shanti	Catalan, Peninsular Spanish	
2003	The Missing	Dot Gilkeson	Peninsular Spanish	
2003	One Missed Call	Nanako, Young Yumi	Peninsular Spanish	Two roles
2003	Peter Pan	Wendy Darling	Peninsular Spanish	
2003	Pirates of the Caribbean: The Curse of the Black Pearl	Young Elizabeth Swann	Peninsular Spanish	
2003	The Safety of Objects	Emily Train	Peninsular Spanish	2001 film dubbed in 2003
2003	Scary Movie 3	Sue	Peninsular Spanish	
2003	School of Rock	Alicia "Brace Face"	Peninsular Spanish	
2003	Spy Kids 3-D: Game Over	Gerti Giggles	Peninsular Spanish	
2003	Thirteen	Kayla	Peninsular Spanish	
2003	Uptown Girls	Lorraine "Ray" Schleine	Peninsular Spanish	
2003	X2	Girl / Jason's avatar	Peninsular Spanish	
2004	13 Going on 30	Young Jenna Rink	Catalan	
2004	Arsène Lupin	Young Clarisse	Peninsular Spanish	
2004	A Very Long Engagement	Hélène Pire	Peninsular Spanish	
2004	Big Fish	Jenny (age 8)	Peninsular Spanish	
2004	The Butterfly Effect	Kayleigh (age 7)	Peninsular Spanish	
2004	The Chronicles of Riddick	Ziza	Peninsular Spanish	
2004	Ella Enchanted	Young Ella	Peninsular Spanish	
2004	The Final Cut	Isabel Bannister	Peninsular Spanish	
2004	Hard Cash	Megan	Peninsular Spanish	2002 film dubbed in 2004
2004	Harry Potter and the Prisoner of Azkaban	Ginny Weasley	Catalan	
2004	Kill Bill: Volume 1	Nikki Bell	Peninsular Spanish	
2004	Man on Fire	Lupita "Pita" Ramos	Peninsular Spanish	
2004	The Princess Diaries 2: Royal Engagement	Carolina, Lorraine	Peninsular Spanish	Two roles
2004	Saw	Diana Gordon	Peninsular Spanish	
2004	Seed of Chucky	Claudia	Peninsular Spanish	
2004	The Stepford Wives	Kimberly Kresby	Catalan, Peninsular Spanish	
2004	Van Helsing	Vampire girl	Peninsular Spanish	
2004	Vanity Fair	Young Becky Sharp	Peninsular Spanish	
2004	The Village	Marybeth	Peninsular Spanish	
2004	Whale Rider	Paikea Apirana	Peninsular Spanish	2002 film dubbed in 2004
2005	The Adventures of Sharkboy and Lavagirl in 3-D	Lavagirl	Peninsular Spanish	
2005	An American Haunting	Betsy Bell	Catalan, Peninsular Spanish	
2005	An Unfinished Life	Griff Gilkyson	Peninsular Spanish	
2005	Battle of the Brave	Young France Carignan	Peninsular Spanish	
2005	Because of Winn-Dixie	Opal Buloni	Peninsular Spanish	
2005	Be Cool	Deshawn	Peninsular Spanish	
2005	Boogeyman	Franny Roberts	Peninsular Spanish	
2005	Capote	Laura Kinney	Peninsular Spanish	
2005	Charlie and the Chocolate Factory	Violet Beauregarde	Catalan, Peninsular Spanish	
2005	Cheaper by the Dozen 2	Jessica Baker	Peninsular Spanish	
2005	The Dark	Sarah	Peninsular Spanish	
2005	Fever Pitch	Tammy	Peninsular Spanish	
2005	Harry Potter and the Goblet of Fire	Ginny Weasley	Catalan	
2005	Hide and Seek	Emily Callaway	Catalan, Peninsular Spanish	
2005	Marilyn Hotchkiss' Ballroom Dancing and Charm School	Ideal girl, Lori, Lucy	Peninsular Spanish	Three roles, also additional voices
2005	Mary Poppins	Jane Banks	Catalan	1964 film dubbed in 2005
2005	Memoirs of a Geisha	Young Pumpkin	Peninsular Spanish	
2005	Naina	Annie	Peninsular Spanish	
2005	The Secret Life of Words		Peninsular Spanish	Narrator
2005	Strayed	Cathy	Peninsular Spanish	2003 film dubbed in 2005
2005	The White Countess	Katya	Catalan	
2005	Yours, Mine & Ours	Joni North	Peninsular Spanish	
2006	Big Momma's House 2	Carrie	Peninsular Spanish	
2006	Charlotte's Web	Fern Arable	Catalan, Peninsular Spanish	
2006	Dead in 3 Days	Kerstin Wagner	Catalan, Peninsular Spanish	Also additional voices
2006	For the Cause	Deanna	Catalan	2000 film dubbed in 2006
2006	Fur	Grace Arbus	Catalan, Peninsular Spanish	
2006	House of D	Melissa	Peninsular Spanish	2004 film dubbed in 2006
2006	Para que nadie olvide tu nombre	Kima	Catalan	
2006	RV	Cassie Munro	Peninsular Spanish	
2006	The Tiger and the Snow	Rosa	Peninsular Spanish	
2006	X-Men: The Last Stand	Kitty Pryde / Shadowcat	Catalan	
2007	Ben X	Scarlite	Catalan	
2007	Bridge to Terabithia	Leslie Burke	Catalan, Peninsular Spanish	
2007	Eastern Promises	Tatiana	Peninsular Spanish	
2007	Harry Potter and the Order of the Phoenix	Ginny Weasley	Catalan	
2007	The Reaping	Loren McConnell	Catalan	
2007	Resident Evil: Extinction	K-Mart, White Queen	Catalan, Peninsular Spanish	Voiced K-Mart in the Catalan dub and White Queen in the Peninsular Spanish dub
2007	Superbad	Becca	Peninsular Spanish	
2007	When Zachary Beaver Came to Town	Scarlet	Peninsular Spanish	2003 film dubbed in 2007
2008	The Burning Plain	Maria	Catalan, Peninsular Spanish	
2008	City of Ember	Lizzie Bisco	Catalan, Peninsular Spanish	
2008	For the Love of a Dog	Vivian	Peninsular Spanish	
2008	Henry Poole Is Here	Millie Stupek	Peninsular Spanish	
2008	Johnny Mad Dog	Laokole	Peninsular Spanish	
2008	Lakeview Terrace	Celia Turner	Catalan, Peninsular Spanish	
2008	Let the Right One In	Eli	Catalan	
2008	LOL (Laughing Out Loud)	Charlotte	Peninsular Spanish	
2008	New York, I Love You	Actress	Catalan	
2008	Nightmare at the End of the Hall	Jane	Peninsular Spanish	TV movie
2008	Nights in Rodanthe	Amanda Willis	Peninsular Spanish	
2008	Nim's Island	Nim Rusoe	Peninsular Spanish	
2008	Sex Drive	Felicia	Peninsular Spanish	
2008	Sleepwalking	Tara	Peninsular Spanish	
2008	Sophie's World	Sofie Amundsen / Hilde Møller	Peninsular Spanish	1999 film dubbed in 2008
2008	Speed Racer	Trixie, Posh blonde girl	Catalan, Peninsular Spanish	Voiced Trixie in the Catalan dub and the Posh blonde girl in the Peninsular Spanish dub
2008	The Spirit	Young Sand Saref	Catalan, Peninsular Spanish	
2008	Swing Vote	Molly Johnson	Catalan, Peninsular Spanish	
2008	Transsiberian	Girl	Catalan, Peninsular Spanish	
2008	Travellers and Magicians	Sonam	Peninsular Spanish	2003 film dubbed in 2008
2008	Trouble at Timpetill	Mireille Stettner	Catalan	
2008	Twilight	Angela Weber	Catalan, Peninsular Spanish	
2008	Untraceable	Annie Haskins	Peninsular Spanish	
2009	Amelia	Elinor Smith	Peninsular Spanish	
2009	Christmas in Wonderland	Shane	Catalan	2007 film dubbed in 2009
2009	E.S.O. Entidad Sobrenatural Oculta	Axia	Peninsular Spanish	
2009	Fame	Joy Moy	Catalan	
2009	The Girl with the Dragon Tattoo	Young Harriet Vanger	Peninsular Spanish	
2009	Ghosts of Girlfriends Past	Teenage Jenny Perotti	Catalan, Peninsular Spanish	
2009	Harry Potter and the Half-Blood Prince	Ginny Weasley	Catalan	
2009	The Hole	Annie Smith	Catalan, Peninsular Spanish	
2009	Hotel for Dogs	Andi	Peninsular Spanish	
2009	The Marc Pease Experience	Meg Brickman	Catalan, Peninsular Spanish	
2009	My Sister's Keeper	Kate Fitzgerald	Peninsular Spanish	
2009	The New Daughter	Louisa James	Catalan	
2009	Pérez 2, el ratoncito de tus sueños / El ratón Pérez 2	Ana	Catalan, Peninsular Spanish	Sequel to The Hairy Tooth Fairy
2009	Push	Cassie Holmes	Catalan, Peninsular Spanish	
2009	Shorts	Helvetica Black	Peninsular Spanish	
2009	Solomon Kane	Meredith Crowthorn	Catalan, Peninsular Spanish	
2009	Tenderness	Maria	Catalan	
2009	The Time Traveler's Wife	Alba (ages 4–10)	Peninsular Spanish	
2009	The Twilight Saga: New Moon	Angela Weber	Peninsular Spanish	
2009	The Twins Effect II	Red Vulture	Peninsular Spanish	2004 film dubbed in 2009
2009	Vicky the Viking	Ylvi	Catalan, Peninsular Spanish	
2009	Where Is Winky's Horse?	Winky Wong	Catalan, Peninsular Spanish	2007 film dubbed in 2009
2009	Where the Wild Things Are	Claire	Peninsular Spanish	
2009	The Year My Parents Went on Vacation	Hanna	Peninsular Spanish	2006 film dubbed in 2009
2009	Year One	Lilith	Peninsular Spanish	
2009	Zombieland	Little Rock	Catalan	
2009	Zorion perfektua	Young Ainhoa	Peninsular Spanish	
2010	Atonement	Briony Tallis (age 13)	Catalan	2007 film dubbed in 2010
2010	Eat Pray Love	Tulsi	Catalan	
2010	Fireflies in the Garden	Young Jane Lawrence	Peninsular Spanish	2008 film dubbed in 2010
2010	Grown Ups	Jasmine Hilliard	Catalan	
2010	Harry Potter and the Deathly Hallows – Part 1	Hermione Granger	Catalan	
2010	Magic Journey to Africa	Jana	Peninsular Spanish	
2010	Magic Silver	Fjellrose	Peninsular Spanish	
2010	Nanny McPhee and the Big Bang	Celia Gray	Peninsular Spanish	
2010	Piranha 3D	Laura Forester	Peninsular Spanish	
2010	The Secret of Moonacre	Maria Merryweather	Peninsular Spanish	2008 film dubbed in 2010
2010	She's Out of My League	Katie	Peninsular Spanish	
2010	Remember Me	Caroline Hawkins	Catalan, Peninsular Spanish	
2010	The Runaways	Cherie Currie	Peninsular Spanish	
2010	Sarah's Key	Zoé Tezac	Catalan, Peninsular Spanish	Dubbed into Catalan in 2011
2010	Scusa ma ti chiamo amore	Diletta	Catalan, Peninsular Spanish	2008 film dubbed in 2011
2010	Takers	Sunday	Peninsular Spanish	
2010	Tomorrow, When the War Began	Corrie Mackenzie	Catalan, Peninsular Spanish	
2010	The Twilight Saga: Eclipse	Angela Weber	Peninsular Spanish	
2011	Big Mommas: Like Father, Like Son	Isabelle	Peninsular Spanish	
2011	Boot Camp	Trina	Peninsular Spanish	2008 film dubbed in 2011
2011	Confessions	Mizuki Kitahara	Peninsular Spanish	
2011	Contagion	Jory Emhoff	Peninsular Spanish	
2011	Crazy, Stupid, Love	Jessica Riley	Peninsular Spanish	
2011	The Girl with the Dragon Tattoo	Young Harriet Vanger	Peninsular Spanish	
2011	Intruders	Mia	Peninsular Spanish	
2011	Jane Eyre	Diana Rivers	Catalan, Peninsular Spanish	
2011	Magic Silver II	Fjellrose	Peninsular Spanish	
2011	Priest	Lucy Pace	Catalan	
2011	Red Riding Hood	Prudence	Peninsular Spanish	
2011	Scream 4	Jill Roberts	Catalan, Peninsular Spanish	
2011	Season of the Witch	Mila	Peninsular Spanish	
2011	The Twilight Saga: Breaking Dawn – Part 1	Angela Weber	Peninsular Spanish	
2011	Vicky and the Treasure of the Gods	Ylvi	Catalan, Peninsular Spanish	
2012	Anna Karenina	Varya, Baroness	Peninsular Spanish	Voiced both Varya, portrayed by Hera Hilmar, and the unnamed baroness portrayed by Holliday Grainger
2012	The French Kissers	Aurore	Peninsular Spanish	2009 film dubbed in 2012
2012	Gone	Molly Conway	Catalan, Peninsular Spanish	
2012	Gran Torino	Sue	Catalan, Peninsular Spanish	
2012	Jack Reacher	Sandy	Peninsular Spanish	
2012	Les Misérables	Éponine	Peninsular Spanish	
2012	Magic Mike	Birthday girl	Peninsular Spanish	
2012	Stuck in Love	Samantha Borgens	Catalan	
2013	After Earth	Senshi Raige	Catalan, Peninsular Spanish	
2013	August: Osage County	Jean Fordham	Peninsular Spanish	
2013	Begin Again	Violet	Peninsular Spanish	
2013	The Call	Casey Welson	Peninsular Spanish	
2013	The Conjuring	Andrea	Peninsular Spanish	
2013	Ender's Game	Valentine Wiggin	Peninsular Spanish	
2013	The Family	Belle Blake	Peninsular Spanish	
2013	How I Live Now	Piper	Peninsular Spanish	
2013	Love Is in the Air	Stéphanie	Peninsular Spanish	
2013	Mean Girls 2	Jo Mitchell	Peninsular Spanish	2011 film dubbed in 2013
2013	Mindscape	Anna Greene	Peninsular Spanish	
2013	The Purge	Zoey Sandin	Peninsular Spanish	
2013	Stoker	India Stoker	Peninsular Spanish	
2013	The Young and Prodigious T. S. Spivet	Gracie	Peninsular Spanish	
2014	Boyhood	Sheena	Peninsular Spanish	
2014	Divergent	Tris Prior	Peninsular Spanish	
2014	Exodus: Gods and Kings	Zipporah	Peninsular Spanish	
2014	The Fault in Our Stars	Hazel Grace Lancaster	Peninsular Spanish	
2014	The Gambler	Amy Phillips	Peninsular Spanish	
2014	The Grand Budapest Hotel	Agatha	Peninsular Spanish	
2014	Magic in the Moonlight	Sophie Baker	Peninsular Spanish	
2014	Noah	Ila	Peninsular Spanish	
2014	No One Lives	Amber	Peninsular Spanish	2012 film dubbed in 2014
2014	Once in a Lifetime	Nadia	Peninsular Spanish	
2014	The Other Woman	Amber	Peninsular Spanish	
2014	Seventh Son	Alice Deane	Peninsular Spanish	
2014	Transformers: Age of Extinction	Tessa Yeager	Peninsular Spanish	
2014	Vampire Academy	Lissa Dragomir	Peninsular Spanish	
2015	The Divergent Series: Insurgent	Tris Prior	Peninsular Spanish	
2015	The Gallows	Pfeifer Ross	Peninsular Spanish	
2015	Pitch Perfect 2	Emily	Peninsular Spanish	
2015	San Andreas	Blake Gaines	Peninsular Spanish	
2015	Steve Jobs	Lisa Brennan-Jobs (age 19)	Peninsular Spanish	
2016	20th Century Women	Julie Hamlin	Peninsular Spanish	
2016	Allied	Louise	Peninsular Spanish	
2016	American Pastoral	Merry Levov	Peninsular Spanish	
2016	Deadpool	Negasonic Teenage Warhead	Peninsular Spanish	
2016	Denial	Laura Tyler	Peninsular Spanish	
2016	The Divergent Series: Allegiant	Tris Prior	Peninsular Spanish	
2016	Fantastic Beasts and Where to Find Them	Chastity Barebone	Catalan	
2016	Gods of Egypt	Zaya	Peninsular Spanish	
2016	Laggies	Annika	Peninsular Spanish	2014 film dubbed in 2016
2016	Miss Peregrine's Home for Peculiar Children	Emma Bloom	Peninsular Spanish	
2016	Money Monster	Molly	Peninsular Spanish	
2016	The Oath	Anna	Peninsular Spanish	
2016	Snowden	Lindsay Mills	Peninsular Spanish	
2016	Star Trek Beyond	Jaylah	Peninsular Spanish	
2016	Train to Busan	Kim Jin-hee	Catalan	
2017	The Beguiled	Alicia	Peninsular Spanish	
2017	Børning 2	Nina Gundersen	Peninsular Spanish	
2017	The Circle	Mae Holland	Peninsular Spanish	
2017	It's the Law	Betty	Peninsular Spanish	
2017	Star Wars: The Last Jedi	Rose Tico	Catalan	
2017	Transformers: The Last Knight	Tessa Yeager	Peninsular Spanish	
2018	Adrift	Tami Oldham	Peninsular Spanish	
2018	Boy Erased	Chloe	Peninsular Spanish	
2018	Deadpool 2	Negasonic Teenage Warhead	Peninsular Spanish	
2018	Greta	Frances McCullen	Peninsular Spanish	
2018	Instant Family	Lizzy	Peninsular Spanish	
2018	Jurassic World: Fallen Kingdom	Zia Rodriguez	Catalan	
2019	A Rainy Day in New York	Ashleigh Enright	Catalan, Peninsular Spanish	
2019	Booksmart	Molly Davidson	Peninsular Spanish	
2019	The Day Shall Come	Kendra Glack	Peninsular Spanish	
2019	Doctor Sleep	Snakebite Andi	Peninsular Spanish	
2019	Dora and the Lost City of Gold	Dora	Peninsular Spanish	
2019	Once Upon a Time in Hollywood	"Squeaky" Fromme	Peninsular Spanish	
2019	Playing with Fire	Brynn	Peninsular Spanish	
2019	Star Wars: The Rise of Skywalker	Rose Tico	Catalan	
2021	The Last Letter from Your Lover	Jennifer Stirling	Peninsular Spanish	
2021	Tom & Jerry	Kayla Judith Forester	Catalan	

=== Television ===
Year	Title	Role	Language(s)	Notes
1998	Alice through the Looking Glass	Little Alice	Catalan	TV movie
2002	Scrubs	Samantha Tanner	Peninsular Spanish	Episode "My Old Lady"
2004	Friends	Mackenzie	Peninsular Spanish	Episode "The One with Princess Consuela"
2005, 2007	Law & Order: Criminal Intent	Marissa, Suzie Waller	Peninsular Spanish	Episode "Unchained" as Marissa, episode "Weeping Willow" as Suzie Waller
2008	Garo Special: Beast of the Demon Night	Rin Yamagatana	Peninsular Spanish	TV movie; 2006 film dubbed in 2008
2009	Fear Itself	Shelby Johnson	Peninsular Spanish	Episode "The Spirit Box"
2009	Molly: An American Girl on the Home Front	Jill McIntire	Catalan	TV movie; 2006 film dubbed in 2009
2009	Royal Pains	Libby	Peninsular Spanish	6 episodes
2010	Glory Daze	Julie	Peninsular Spanish	Recurring role
2010	Millennium	Young Harriet Vanger	Peninsular Spanish	Main role; expansion of 2009 film The Girl with the Dragon Tattoo
2009–2011	NCIS	Shakira Zayd, Heather Kincaid, Jancey Gilroy	Peninsular Spanish	Episode "Legend (Part II)" as Shakira Zayd, episode "Truth or Consequences" as Heather Kincaid, episode "Freedom" as Jancey Gilroy
2011	Falling far Marrakech (Liebe ohne Minze)	Mira Schiller	Peninsular Spanish	TV movie
2011	The Glades	Amy	Peninsular Spanish	Episode "Doppelganger"
2011–2012	The Killing	Sterling Fitch	Peninsular Spanish	Recurring role
2012	Switched at Birth	Elisa Sawyer	Peninsular Spanish	2 episodes in season 2: "Drive in the Knife" and "Tight Rope Walker"
2010, 2013	CSI: Crime Scene Investigation	Haley Jones, Tara Janssen	Peninsular Spanish	Episode "Turn, Turn, Turn" as Haley Jones, episode "Double Fault" as Tara Janssen
2012–2013	Polseres vermelles	Cristina	Peninsular Spanish	Main role; dubbed from Catalan, Ribó was not in the original Catalan show
2013	Crossing Lines	Angela Conti	Peninsular Spanish	Episode "Desperation & Desperados"
2013	House of Lies	Beth	Peninsular Spanish	Episode "Veritas"
2013	Lost Girl	Jane	Peninsular Spanish	Episode "Fae-ge Against The Machine"; 2010 episode dubbed in 2013
2014	Halo: Nightfall	Talitha Macer	Peninsular Spanish	Webseries
2014	The Mentalist	Christie de Jorjo	Peninsular Spanish	Episode "Blue Bird"
2016	Love	Reese	Peninsular Spanish	Episode "It Begins"
2017	Will	Alice Burbage	Peninsular Spanish	Main role
2019	Another Life	August Catawnee	Peninsular Spanish	Main role
2019	Mr. Iglesias	Marisol Fuentes	Peninsular Spanish	Main role
2020	Industry	Harper Stern	Peninsular Spanish	Main role
2020	Unorthodox	Esther Shapiro	Peninsular Spanish	Main role

=== Commercials ===
Year	Title	Role	Language(s)	Notes
2019	"The Almost Perfect Gift"	Emma Roberts	Peninsular Spanish	Advertisement video campaign for Tous
