= Mummy, I'm a Zombie =

- Spanish language film poster
- Directed by: Ricardo Ramón; Beñat Beitia
- Screenplay by: Daniel Torres
- Produced by: Alberto Gerrikabeitia; Executive producer: Joxe Portela
- Starring: Paula Ribó; Ivan Labanda; Núria Trifol; Elisabeth Bergalló; Luis Posada; Roser Batalla; Francesc Belda
- Music by: Manel Gil-Inglada
- Production company: Abra Producciones
- Distributed by: Lionsgate Home Entertainment
- Release date: September 21, 2014 (San Sebastián International Film Festival)
- Running time: 82 minutes
- Country: Spain
- Languages: Catalan; English; Basque; Spanish

Mummy, I'm a Zombie, also known under its working Spanish title Mamá, soy una zombi and later re-titled Dixie y la rebelión zombi, is a 2014 Spanish animated film and the sequel to the 2011 film Daddy, I'm a Zombie. It was directed by Ricardo Ramón and Beñat Beitia, and actress Kimberly Wharton returned to voice the main character of Dixie Grim in its English dub. The original film was released in three of the four official languages in Spain: Catalan, Basque, and Spanish.

== Synopsis ==
Following the events of the prior movie Dixie is still trying to live a normal life after the divorce of her parents, particularly as her mother is keen on excluding her father from an upcoming Halloween party. Her mother is also pressuring her to stick with one type of social group rather than choosing her friends freely. Dixie also has to contend with lingering feelings for her former crush Ray and stress over an impending election for class president. In the midst of all of this Dixie is struck down with appendicitis and when she goes under anesthesia she once again finds herself in the world of the dead.

She is reunited with her friends Isis and Gonner, who want her to restore the powers of the magical amulet Azoth. Nebulosa has returned to wreak havoc as well as Piroska, now as a ghost, and there is now also a group of zombie-hunting boys out to destroy all zombies as the undead can now travel freely between the two worlds. Meanwhile, unbeknownst to Dixie, Alyssa and Melissa are setting her up so they can ditch her and no one will be able to stand her afterward. To win more votes for class president, Dixie decides to throw a Halloween party and invite the whole class, but Melissa and Alyssa won't let her. Dixie becomes more stressed about her situation, and as her stress grows, she decides she needs to find the essence of the Azoth with Gonner and Isis to restore all good to the world.

The search to revive the Azoth's powers is a costly one that results in the death of Isis and distancing of Gonner. Dixie is also forced to reveal that she is a zombie when Nebulosa and Piroska's forces enter the mortal realm. Dixie faces off against Nebulosa using the powers of the Azoth, but is knocked to the ground. Nebulosa's gloating over the victory is short lived, as her attack angers the zombies and with their combined forces, defeat her and Piroska. The living and the dead also form a tentative peace, as many happily reunite with their deceased loved ones.

Dixie wakes in her hospital bed, her appendix removed. She happily takes the removed organ and holds her Halloween party, which is wildly successful. Melissa and Alyssa also join the party, unable to stay away. The film ends with Dixie opening a window and looking out at the Halloween night. As she wishes that her friends were there with her, she hears their laughter as the wind blows in Gonner's eyepatch and Isis' headpiece, leaving Dixie confident that Gonner and Isis are still out there watching over her even after their sacrifices.

== Voice actors ==
=== Spanish release ===
- Paula Ribó as Dixie Malasombra
- Ivan Labanda as Gonner, Ernie
- Núria Trifol as Isis
- Elisabeth Bergalló as Piroska
- Luis Posada as Ricardo Malasombra, Vitriol
- Roser Batalla as Nigreda, Sofía Malasombra
- Francesc Belda as Thorko
- Albert Mieza as Fizcko
- Clara Schwarze as Liliana
- Manuel Osto as History Professor

=== English release ===
- Kimberly Wharton as Dixie Grim
- MJ Lallo as Gonner, Ernie
- Ratana as Isis
- Katie Leigh as Piroska, Miss Peachfeather
- Karen McCarthy as Nebulosa
- Danny Katiana as Tarizko, Thorko, Enfermero
- Mark Allen Jr. as Wires, Marbles
- Bobby Thong as Cricket, Brack
- Doug Gochman as Phil Grim, Vitriol, Ray
- Jennifer Wydra as Sophia
- Heather Downey as Allyssa
- Tracy Charles as Melissa, Julia
- Josh Snyder as History Teacher

== Reception ==
El Correo gave the film a positive review and favorably compared it to popular animation companies and directors such as Walt Disney, Hayao Miyazaki, and DreamWorks. In contrast, Time Out Barcelona rated the film at only two stars and criticized it as being overly dull and lacking the nerve and structure of its predecessor. Guia del Ocio compared the film favorably against Tim Burton's films The Nightmare Before Christmas and Corpse Bride.

20 Minutes noted the film as a sequel to Dad, I'm a Zombie, with a return of the first film's directors and voice cast.

Close-UpFilm generally praised the film and wrote it was "a good watch but can be a tad dreary at times and doesn't quite deliver in terms of scares, even for a children's movie."

== Release ==
The film premiered September 21, 2014 at San Sebastián International Film Festival, and screened October at Festival do Rio, as well as in November at Mar del Plata International Film Festival.

The project had a free children's premiere screenings November 1, 2014 in Madrid, Barcelona, Seville, Valencia, and Bilbao, with tickets awarded through participation in a contest, and followed November 7 with wide theatrical release across Spain.
