= Rigoberta Bandini =

Spanish musical act and musician

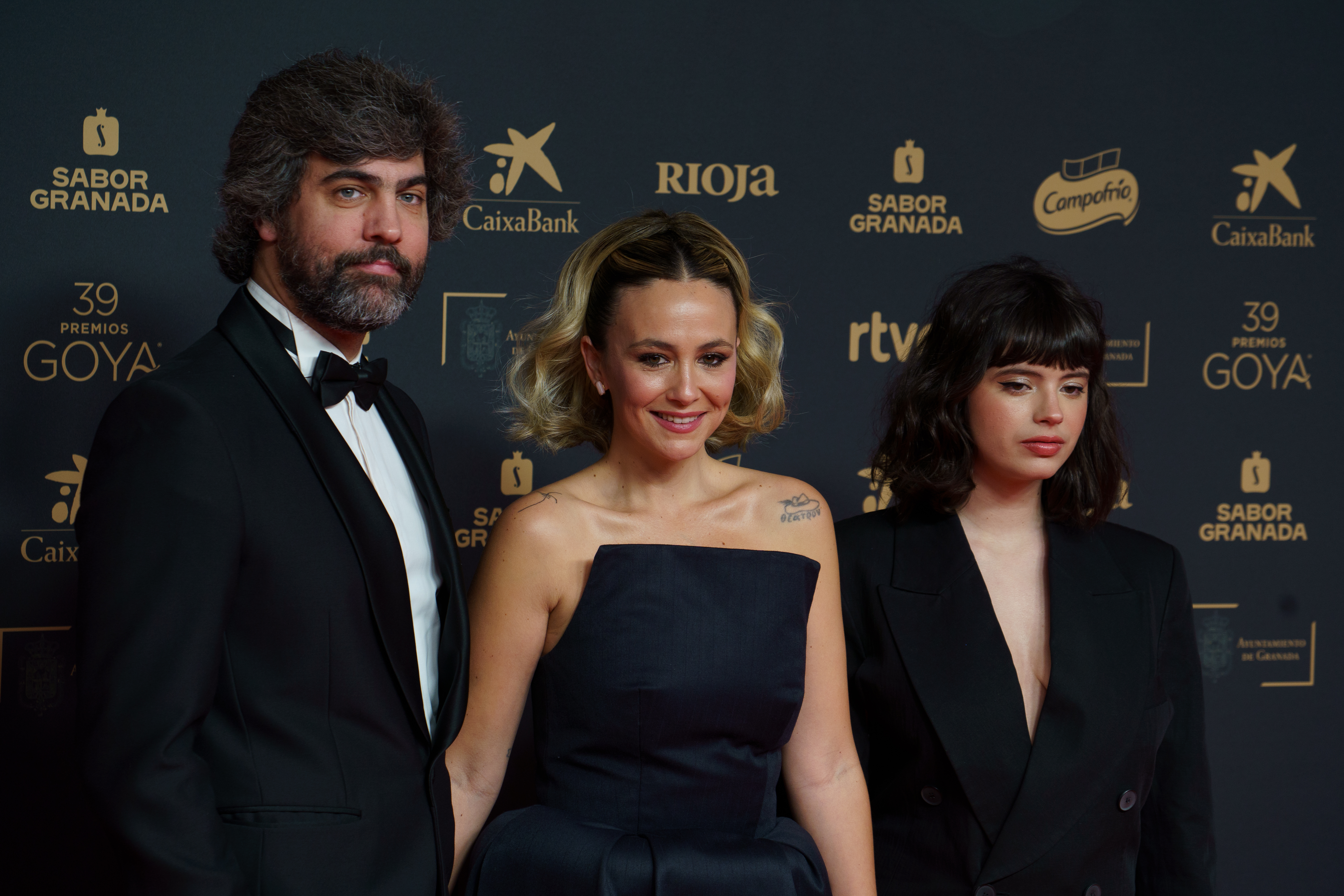
- Rigoberta Bandini at the 39th Goya Awards in 2025, from left Navarro, Ribó and Memé

Background information
- Origin: Barcelona, Spain
- Genres: Dance, power pop, indietronica, baroque pop
- Years active: 2019–present
- Members: Paula Ribó; Esteban Navarro; Belén Barenys; Joan Barenys

Rigoberta Bandini is a Spanish musical act as well as the stage name of its frontwoman, singer-songwriter Paula Ribó. Other members of the band are Ribó's partner, Esteban Navarro, and cousins, Joan Barenys and Belén Barenys (Memé), who variously provide instrumentation and vocals. Ribó and Memé sing; Barenys is a multi-instrumentalist; and Navarro plays keyboard and produces with Ribó. The act has won two Premios Odeón and a Goya, among other accolades.

== History ==
In 2019, Paula Ribó, who had been a member of the Mamzelles in the 2010s and dubbed many musicals into Spanish and Catalan, launched her solo music career under the stage name of Rigoberta Bandini. The name combines those of human rights activist Rigoberta Menchú and the John Fante character Arturo Bandini.

Ribó began releasing music as Rigoberta Bandini in 2020, which she, Navarro, and the Barenys siblings had recorded. That year, Rigoberta Bandini (still principally identified as Ribó as a solo act) rose to prominence in Spain when the singles "Too Many Drugs" and "In Spain We Call It Soledad" went viral. The group began performing together in 2021. The first live performance as a group was a selection of their songs recorded for a live-at-home concert from the Thyssen Museum in December 2020, after which they began touring. They found further success with the song "Ay mamá", with which they competed in the inaugural Benidorm Fest.

== Style ==
The music of Rigoberta Bandini draws on many feminist influences, heard overtly in "Perra" and "Ay mamá". Ribó has said that, in her songwriting, she enjoys lyrics that have humour and entertain her.

Clash described a live set by the group as "high-energy chaos", noting that the music drew on genres including flamenco, synth-pop, and rap. Eurovision Song Contest music website Wiwibloggs described the group's musical style as a fusion of harmonic choral elements and electropop. Hot Press compared the group's sound to Pet Shop Boys, Peaches, Celine Dion and Pussy Riot.

In terms of live performance, Clash noted that the music is elevated by the energy of the group. It praised their ability to all be dancing energetically and at the same time "maintain their ABBA-like harmonies". La Vanguardia compared the performance style to having a party on stage; Time Out Barcelona described the Rigoberta Bandini performance at Primavera Sound 2022 as a variety show or a party, as space was given for Navarro to add some stand-up comedy and for Memé to take more of a spotlight. Iconic to their concerts, Ribó would characteristically wear her old school uniform from the Col·legi de les Teresianes, with Memé in a similar outfit and Navarro and Barenys dressed as "computer nerd cool".

The cover art of Rigoberta Bandini singles always features a box frame with the name of the song and the artist repeated around it.

== Personnel ==
- Paula Ribó González – an actress and singer, Ribó is the frontwoman of the group who is also individually known as Rigoberta Bandini. She is the lead vocalist and writes, composes, and produces the songs.
- Esteban Navarro Dordal – a comic actor known for Venga Monjas and Ribó's partner, Navarro also writes, composes, and produces, and plays the keyboard and synthesiser.
- Belén Barenys González (Mari Belén Barenys González, also known by the stage name Memé) – also an actress and singer, and Ribó's cousin, Memé has previously worked with Ribó in dubbing, including voicing the young Merida across from Ribó as the main version in the Catalan version of Brave. She provides background vocals, and occasionally lead vocals alongside Ribó.
- Joan Barenys González – an actor and musician, Memé's brother and Ribó's cousin, he has dubbed films with both women, including the Catalan version of Up with Memé and the Castilian version of Hotel for Dogs with Ribó. He is a multi-instrumentalist; originally a pianist, in Rigoberta Bandini performances Navarro takes the keys and Barenys provides percussion and guitar.

== Discography ==
=== Studio albums ===
Title	Details	Peak chart positions	
Title	Details	SPA Albums	SPA Vinyl
La Emperatriz	Released: 7 October 2022; Format: Digital download, CD, LP, streaming; Label: Independent	5	4
Jesucrista Superstar	Released: 21 March 2025; Format: Digital download, CD, LP, streaming; Label: Independent	7	

=== Singles ===
List of singles as lead artist, with chart positions and certifications, showing year released and album name
Title	Year	Peaks	Certifications	Album
Title	Year	SPA	Certifications	Album
"Too Many Drugs"	2020	63	PROMUSICAE: Gold	Non-album singles
"Que Cristo Baje"	2020	—	—	Non-album singles
"In Spain We Call It Soledad"	2020	49	PROMUSICAE: Gold	Non-album singles
"Perra"	2021	26	PROMUSICAE: Gold	Non-album singles
"The Fuck Fuck Fuck Poem"	2021	—	—	Non-album singles
"A Ver Qué Pasa" / "Aviam Què Passa"	2021	45	PROMUSICAE: Gold	Non-album singles
"Julio Iglesias"	2021	—	—	Non-album singles
"Ay mamá"	2021	1	PROMUSICAE: 2× Platinum	Non-album singles
"Ay mamá (Génesis)"	2022	—	—	Non-album singles
"A todos mis amantes"	2022	—	—	Non-album singles
"Así bailaba" (with Amaia)	2022	41	—	Non-album singles
"Miami Beach"	2023	—	—	Non-album singles
"Yo Solo Quiero Amor"	2023	—	—	Love & Revolution (original soundtrack)
"Qué más da" (with Julieta Venegas)	2023	—	—	Non-album single
"siete días"	2026			
"cançó de primavera"	2026			
"—" denotes a recording that did not chart or was not released in that territory.

==== As featured artist ====
- "Se va" (2021) (with Delaporte)
- "Amanecer" (2021) (with Alizzz)
- "Splash (màs que mares)" (2024) (with Colapesce and Dimartino)
- "Contradicción" (2024) (with Love of Lesbian)
- "La Niña Bonita" (2024) (with Pipiolas)
- "Petit bonbon" (2024) (with Bon Entendeur)

==== Promotional singles ====
- "Fiesta" (2020)
- "Cuando tú nazcas" (2020)

== Awards and nominations ==
Year	Organization	Category	Nominee/work	Result	Ref.
2021	iCat	Best Song Not in Catalan	"Perra"	Won	
2021	Premios MIN	Song of the Year	"In Spain We Call It Soledad"	Won	
2021	Premios MIN	Best Breakthrough Artist	Rigoberta Bandini	Won	
2022	Premios MIN	Amazon Music Award for Best Artist	Rigoberta Bandini	Won	
2022	Premios MIN	Radio 3 Song of the Year Award	"Ay mamá"	Won	
2022	Premios MIN	Best Original Lyrics	"Ay mamá"	Nominated	
2022	Premios MIN	Best Video	"Perra"	Nominated	
2022	Premios Odeón	Odeón Revelation Artist – Alternative	Rigoberta Bandini	Won	
2022	Premios Odeón	Best Alternative Song	"Perra"	Nominated	
2022	Premis RAC105	Best Song	"Ay mamá"	Won	
2022	Premios +Músicas	Best EP	"In Spain We Call It Soledad"	Won	
2022	Premios +Músicas	Best Song	"Ay mamá"	Won	
2022	Premios +Músicas	Best Artist	Rigoberta Bandini	Won	
2022	Premios +Músicas	Best New Artist	Rigoberta Bandini	Won	
2022	Premios +Músicas	Best Music Video	"Perra"	Won	
2022	Premios +Músicas	Best Pop Record	"Ay mamá"	Won	
2022	iCat	Best Song Not in Catalan	"Ay mamá"	Won	
2023	Premios Odeón	Best Alternative Song	"Así bailaba" (with Amaia)	Won	
2023	Premio Ruido		La Emperatriz	Nominated	
2023	Premios MIN	Best Artist	Rigoberta Bandini	Nominated	
2023	Premios MIN	Best Video	"Ay mamá"	Won	
2023	Premios MIN	Best Live Performance	"Too Many Drugs (Directo en Nits Del Fòrum)"	Nominated	
2024	38th Goya Awards	Best Original Song	"Yo solo quiero amor" (from Love & Revolution)	Won	
