= List of number-one singles of 2022 (Spain) =

This lists the singles that reached number one on the Spanish PROMUSICAE sales and airplay charts in 2022. Total sales correspond to the data sent by regular contributors to sales volumes and by digital distributors.

== Chart history ==
Week	Issue date	Top Streaming, Downloads & Physical Sales			Most Airplay		
Week	Issue date	Artist(s)	Song	Ref.	Artist(s)	Song	Ref.
1	December 31	Morad	"Pelele"		Adele	"Easy on Me"	
2	January 7	Rauw Alejandro and Chencho Corleone	"Desesperados"		Sebastián Yatra	"Tacones Rojos"	
3	January 14	Rauw Alejandro and Chencho Corleone	"Desesperados"		Sebastián Yatra	"Tacones Rojos"	
4	January 21	Rauw Alejandro and Chencho Corleone	"Desesperados"		Sebastián Yatra	"Tacones Rojos"	
5	January 28	Rigoberta Bandini	"Ay mamá"		Sebastián Yatra	"Tacones Rojos"	
6	February 4	La Pantera, Quevedo, Juseph, Cruz Cafuné and Abhir Hathi	"Cayó La Nochee (Remix)"		Sebastián Yatra	"Tacones Rojos"	
7	February 11	La Pantera, Quevedo, Juseph, Cruz Cafuné and Abhir Hathi	"Cayó La Nochee (Remix)"		Sebastián Yatra	"Tacones Rojos"	
8	February 18	Becky G and Karol G	"Mamiii"		Sebastián Yatra	"Tacones Rojos"	
9	February 25	La Pantera, Quevedo, Juseph, Cruz Cafuné and Abhir Hathi	"Cayó La Nochee (Remix)"		Sebastián Yatra	"Tacones Rojos"	
10	March 4	La Pantera, Quevedo, Juseph, Cruz Cafuné and Abhir Hathi	"Cayó La Nochee (Remix)"		Sebastián Yatra	"Tacones Rojos"	
11	March 11	La Pantera, Quevedo, Juseph, Cruz Cafuné and Abhir Hathi	"Cayó La Nochee (Remix)"		Sebastián Yatra	"Tacones Rojos"	
12	March 18	Rosalía	"Candy"		Ana Mena	"Música Ligera"	
13	March 25	Paulo Londra	"Plan A"		Ana Mena	"Música Ligera"	
14	April 2	Alejo, Feid and ROBI	"Pantysito"		Sebastián Yatra	"Tacones Rojos"	
15	April 9	Alejo, Feid and ROBI	"Pantysito"		Ana Mena	"Música Ligera"	
16	April 16	Alejo, Feid and ROBI	"Pantysito"		Ana Mena	"Música Ligera"	
17	April 23	Paulo Londra and Bizarrap	"Music Sessions Vol. 23"		Ana Mena	"Música Ligera"	
18	April 30	Paulo Londra and Bizarrap	"Music Sessions Vol. 23"		Aitana and Nicki Nicole	"Formentera"	
19	May 6	Bad Bunny	"Moscow Mule"		Sebastián Yatra	"Tacones Rojos"	
20	May 13	Chanel	"SloMo"		Camila Cabello featuring Ed Sheeran	"Bam Bam"	
21	May 20	Bad Bunny	"Tití Me Preguntó"		Sebastián Yatra	"Tacones Rojos"	
22	May 27	Bad Bunny	"Tití Me Preguntó"		Harry Styles	"As It Was"	
23	June 3	Bad Bunny	"Tití Me Preguntó"		Harry Styles	"As It Was"	
24	June 10	Bad Bunny	"Tití Me Preguntó"		Camila Cabello featuring Ed Sheeran	"Bam Bam"	
25	June 17	Bad Bunny	"Tití Me Preguntó"		Camila Cabello featuring Ed Sheeran	"Bam Bam"	
26	June 24	Bad Bunny	"Tití Me Preguntó"		Shakira and Rauw Alejandro	"Te Felicito"	
27	July 1	Bad Bunny	"Tití Me Preguntó"		Harry Styles	"As It Was"	
28	July 8	Bizarrap and Quevedo	"Quevedo: Bzrp Music Sessions, Vol. 52"		Dani Fernández	"Dile a los demás"	
29	July 15	Bizarrap and Quevedo	"Quevedo: Bzrp Music Sessions, Vol. 52"		Shakira and Rauw Alejandro	"Te Felicito"	
30	July 22	Bizarrap and Quevedo	"Quevedo: Bzrp Music Sessions, Vol. 52"		Harry Styles	"As It Was"	
31	July 29	Rosalía	"Despechá"		Shakira and Rauw Alejandro	"Te Felicito"	
32	August 5	Bizarrap and Quevedo	"Quevedo: Bzrp Music Sessions, Vol. 52"		Camila Cabello featuring Ed Sheeran	"Bam Bam"	
33	August 12	Rosalía	"Despechá"		Shakira and Rauw Alejandro	"Te Felicito"	
34	August 19	Bizarrap and Quevedo	"Quevedo: Bzrp Music Sessions, Vol. 52"		Camila Cabello featuring Ed Sheeran	"Bam Bam"	
35	August 26	Bizarrap and Quevedo	"Quevedo: Bzrp Music Sessions, Vol. 52"		Harry Styles	"As It Was"	
36	September 2	Bizarrap and Quevedo	"Quevedo: Bzrp Music Sessions, Vol. 52"		Camila Cabello featuring Ed Sheeran	"Bam Bam"	
37	September 9	Bizarrap and Quevedo	"Quevedo: Bzrp Music Sessions, Vol. 52"		Camila Cabello featuring Ed Sheeran	"Bam Bam"	
38	September 16	Bizarrap and Quevedo	"Quevedo: Bzrp Music Sessions, Vol. 52"		Rosalía	"Despechá"	
39	September 23	Bizarrap and Quevedo	"Quevedo: Bzrp Music Sessions, Vol. 52"		Rosalía	"Despechá"	
40	September 30	Bizarrap and Quevedo	"Quevedo: Bzrp Music Sessions, Vol. 52"		Sangiovanni and Aitiana	"Mariposas"	
41	October 7	Bizarrap and Quevedo	"Quevedo: Bzrp Music Sessions, Vol. 52"		Sangiovanni and Aitiana	"Mariposas"	
42	October 14	Bizarrap and Quevedo	"Quevedo: Bzrp Music Sessions, Vol. 52"		Rosalía	"Despechá"	
43	October 21	Manuel Turizo	"La Bachata"		Rosalía	"Despechá"	
44	October 28	Manuel Turizo	"La Bachata"		Sangiovanni and Aitiana	"Mariposas"	
45	November 4	Mora and Quevedo	"Apa"		Sangiovanni and Aitiana	"Mariposas"	
46	November 11	Manuel Turizo	"La Bachata"		Sangiovanni and Aitiana	"Mariposas"	
47	November 18	Bizarrap and Duki	"Duki: Bzrp Music Sessions, Vol. 50"		David Guetta and Bebe Rexha	"I'm Good (Blue)"	
48	November 25	Manuel Turizo	"La Bachata"		Sangiovanni and Aitiana	"Mariposas"	
49	December 2	Arcángel and Bad Bunny	"La Jumpa"		Manuel Turizo	"La Bachata"	
50	December 9	Arcángel and Bad Bunny	"La Jumpa"		Manuel Turizo	"La Bachata"	
51	December 16	Quevedo and Myke Towers	"Playa del Inglés"		Manuel Turizo	"La Bachata"	
52	December 23	Arcángel and Bad Bunny	"La Jumpa"		Manuel Turizo	"La Bachata"	
