= Paula Ribó =

Spanish singer and voice actress; frontwoman of Rigoberta Bandini

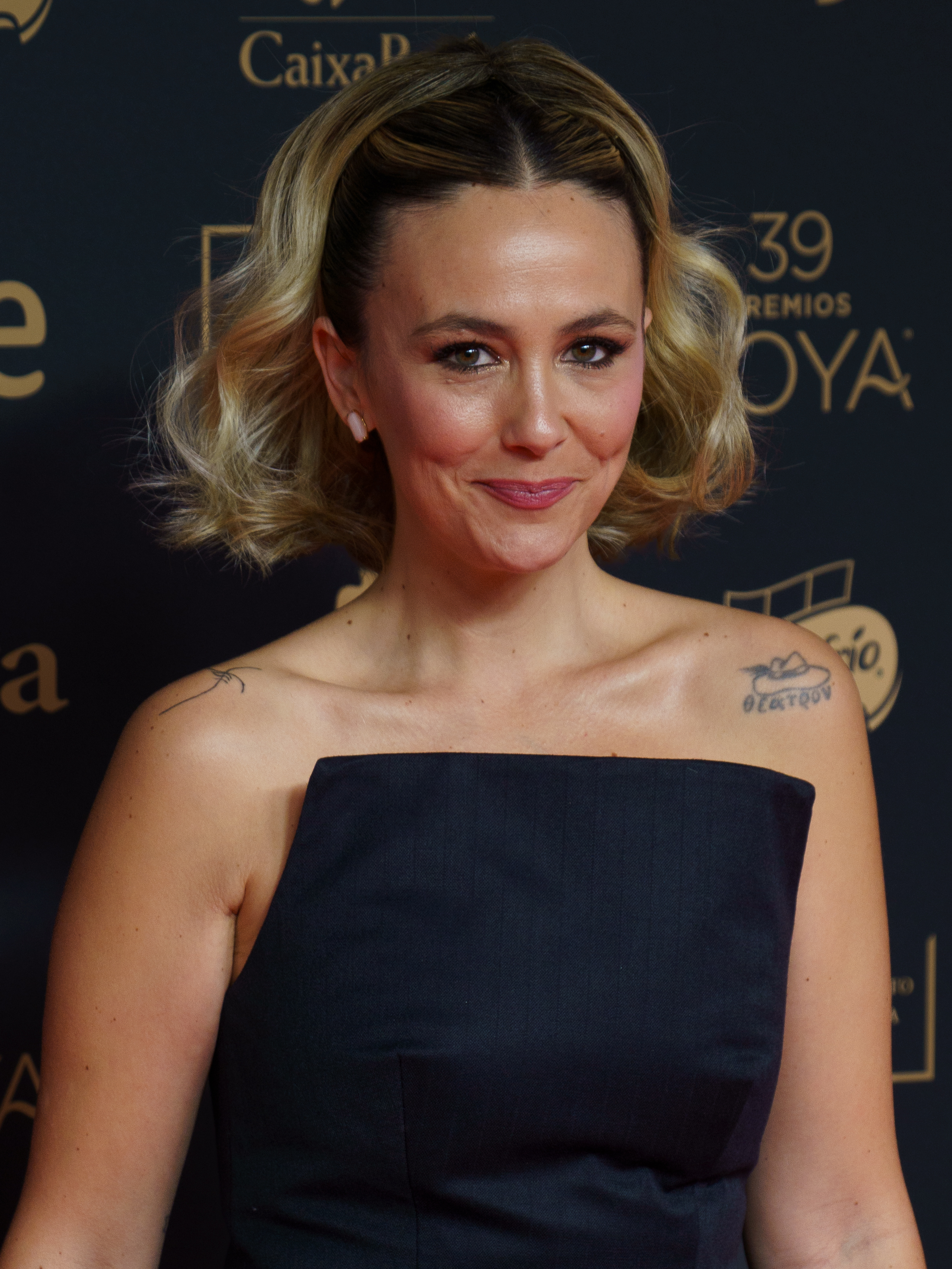
- Ribó in 2025
- Born: 30 April 1990 (age 35); Sant Gervasi, Barcelona, Catalonia, Spain
- Education: Col·legi de les Teresianes
- Alma mater: Institut del Teatre
- Occupations: Singer; actress; playwright; radio host
- Years active: 1997–present
- Spouse: Esteban Navarro (m. 2023)
- Children: 1
- Family: Belén Barenys (cousin)
- Musical career
- Genres: Dance; electropop; indietronica
- Instruments: Vocals
- Website: paularibo.com

Paula Ribó González (born 30 April 1990), is a Spanish singer, actress and playwright best known for her musical project Rigoberta Bandini, for which she writes, performs, and produces the music. Ribó's multi-departmental professional career started at age seven, when she provided the Iberian Spanish dubbing voice work for the title character of the children animated series Caillou. She continued to work as a voice actress in both Catalan and Castilian for international firms such as Universal and Disney starring in big productions such as Peter Pan and Brave, as well as in film series like The Twilight Saga or The Divergent Series and musical films such as Les Misérables, Sing and Frozen. She also has been the regular Spanish-dubbed voice of Emma Stone, Dakota Fanning and Shailene Woodley.

After graduating Institut del Teatre, she ventured into the music scene in 2011 alongside two college friends with the formation The Mamzelles. They released two studio albums. In parallel to her contribution in film, Ribó created her own theatre production company, directed four plays, started in six, and wrote other four. She also starred in selected Catalan television films and series.

In 2019, Ribó launched her second musical project under the pseudonym Rigoberta Bandini. Her third single, "In Spain We Call It Soledad", released in 2020, became viral on Spotify and launched Bandini into stardom. She achieved national recognition in 2022 placing as the runner-up at the Benidorm Fest in the run to represent Spain in the Eurovision Song Contest 2022 with the song "Ay mamá", which became her first entry in and first number one song on the Spanish charts.

== Career ==
In 1996, at the age of six, Ribó participated at the Zecchino d'Oro children song competition in Italy with the song "La scatola dei tesori".

She also debuted in voice acting in an early age. Among other works, she voiced Caillou in the Peninsular Spanish dubbing of the homonym series, Chihiro in the Peninsular Spanish dubbing of Spirited Away, and Anna in the Catalan dubbing of Frozen.

Ribó studied theatre at the Institut del Teatre in Barcelona. In 2010, together with Paula Malia y Bàrbara Mestanza, she founded the music group The Mamzelles. The band released two albums Que se desnude otra (2012) and Totem (2014). In 2012, they created a theatre company, The Mamzelles Teatre.

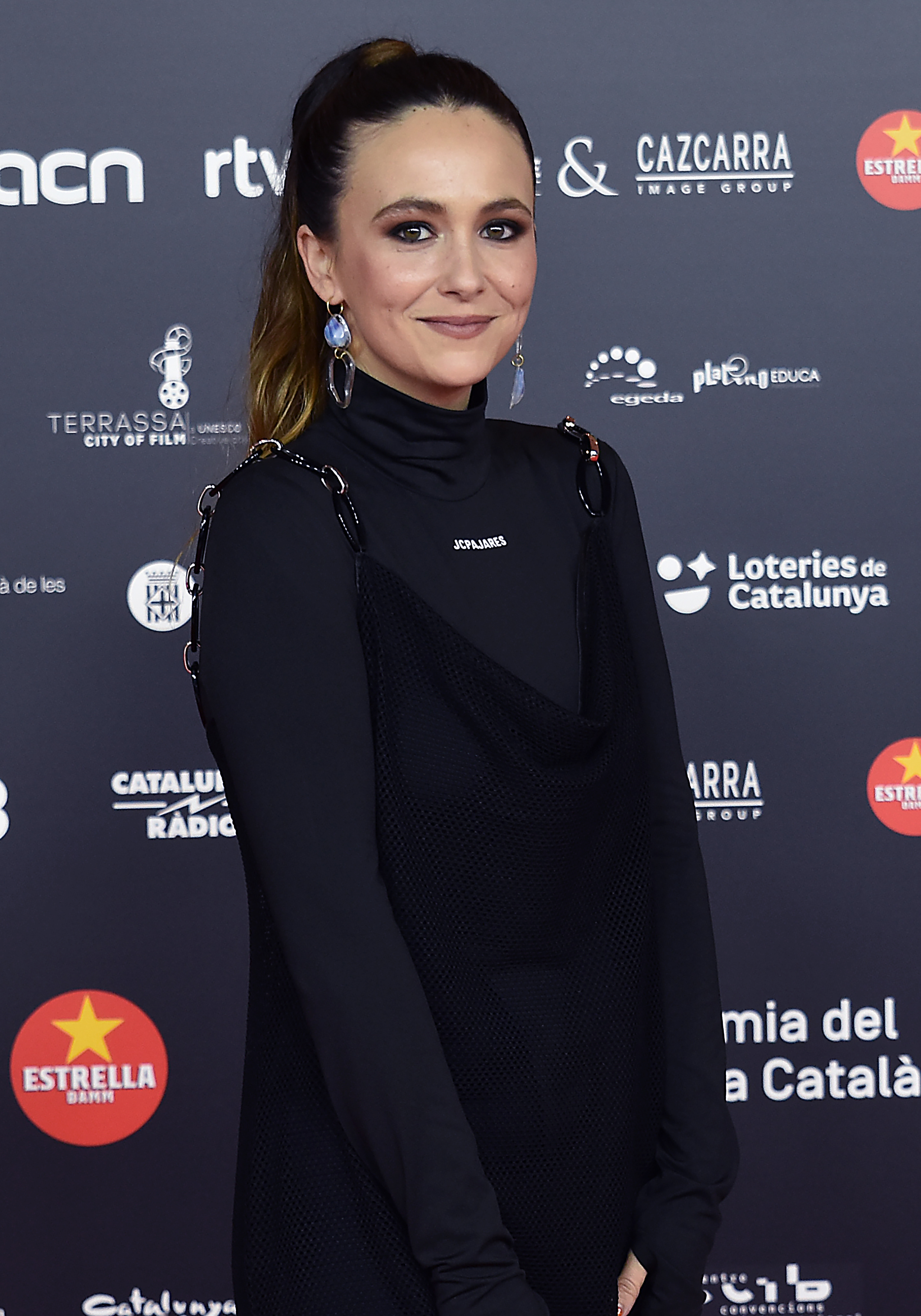
Ribó attending the 13th Gaudí Awards in 2021

In 2019, Ribó launched her solo music career under the stage name of Rigoberta Bandini, a fusion of names from human rights activist Rigoberta Menchú and John Fante character Arturo Bandini. In 2020, she rose to prominence in Spain as her single "In Spain We Call It Soledad" became viral in Spotify. In December 2021, she was selected to participate in the first edition of Benidorm Fest, the song festival organised to determine Spain's entry for the Eurovision Song Contest, with the song "Ay mamá", placing as the runner-up. The song became her first entry in the Spanish charts, as well as her first single to reach the first position in the Spanish charts. Having already accumulated a large fanbase, the appearance at Benidorm Fest "catapulted her to the top of the Spanish music industry".

Ribó has written two "songs of the summer" for Estrella Damm, each with Spanish and Catalan versions. In 2021, she wrote "A ver qué pasa" / "Aviam què passa", which she also performed, and in 2022 wrote "Aquí, ahora y así" / "Aquí, ara i així", which was performed by Santi Balmes, Clara Viñals, and Renaldo. She also wrote the song "Bienvenidos al show", performed by Amaia, in 2022; a few months later, the two announced another song, "Así bailaba", performed together.

In August 2023, her song "Canciones de Amor a Ti" was featured in the soundtrack of Amazon Prime Video's "Red, White & Royal Blue" film.

== Personal life ==
Ribó is married to comic Esteban Navarro, from the comedy group Venga Monjas. The pair began their relationship in March 2019 and had their first child, Nico, in June 2020. Becoming pregnant only six months into a relationship, Ribó said that she had to "rethink many things" at the time but that having him was the best decision she made. Ribó and Navarro married in a civil service at Barcelona City Hall in May 2023; unconventionally the mayor, Ada Colau, was the officiant. They held a reception in June 2023, with Ribó dedicating a song to Navarro in a moment that became a viral video.

Ribó has an older sister. Her father Pepe has been president of the Federación de Peñas Madridistas de Cataluña, the group that organises official fan groups of Real Madrid CF in Catalonia, since 2007. In 2022, Ribó and Navarro attended the premiere of Alexia: Labor Omnia Vincit, the documentary mini-series about Barcelona femení captain Alexia Putellas.

== Discography ==
=== Studio albums & EPs ===
Title	Artist	Details
Que se Desnude Otra	The Mamzelles	Released: 5 June 2012; Formats: Digital download, CD; Label: DiscMedi
1990 a.C. i la la Mercè	The Mamzelles	Released: 7 September 2012; Label: DiscMedi
Totem	The Mamzelles	Released: 7 October 2014; Formats: Digital download, CD; Label: DiscMedi
La Emperatriz	Rigoberta Bandini	Released: 7 October 2022; Format: Digital download, CD, LP, streaming; Label: Independent
Jesucrista superstar	Rigoberta Bandini	Released: 21 March 2025; Format: Digital download, CD, LP, streaming; Label: Independent

=== Singles ===
List of singles as lead artist (as Paula Ribó)
Title	Year	Album
"El que cal fer"	2021	Frozen II (soundtrack) †
"No tot canviarà" (with Gisela, Xavi Duch, Jordi Ninus, Manuel Gimeno)	2021	Frozen II (soundtrack) †

† Catalan release

=== Songwriting credits ===
List of singles as writer/composer only
Title	Lead artist	Year	Peaks	Album
Title	Lead artist	Year	SPA	Album
"Bienvenidos al show"	Amaia	2022	88	Cuando No Sé Quién Soy
"Aquí, ahora y así" / "Aquí, ara i així"	Santi Balmes, Renaldo & Clara	2022	—	Non-album single
"—" denotes a recording that did not chart or was not released in that territory.

== Filmography ==
=== Film ===
Year	Title	Role	Notes
2011	Daddy, I'm a Zombie	Dixie Grim	Voice
2014	Mummy, I'm a Zombie	Dixie Grim	Voice
TBA	Contornos		

=== Television ===
Year	Title	Role	Notes
2014	Crackòvia	Various	
2015	Searching for Meritxell	Paula	Independent television film
2016	Cites	Eva	1 Episode; anthology series based on Dates
2017	Quién Eres	Paula	Television film
2018	Com si fos ahir	Emma	1 episode
2021	L'última nit del karaoke	Íngrid	3 episodes
2022	The Girls at the Back	Herself / Rigoberta Bandini	1 episode; her music heavily features on the soundtrack and creator Daniel Sánchez Arévalo said that she was an influence when he was writing the series.

=== Commercials ===
Year	Title	Role	Notes
2012–2013	"Envàs, on vas?"	Herself	Catalan government recycling campaign featuring the Mamzelles
2021	"Amor a Primera Vista"	Herself / Rigoberta Bandini	Estrella Damm campaign

=== Composition and musical direction ===
Year	Title	Role	Notes
2020	Coolhunters	Musical director	New Year's Special
2021	Alopècia androgènica	Composer	Short film
2021	Buga Buga	Composer	Television series
