= The Empress (tarot card) =

Tarot card of the Major Arcana

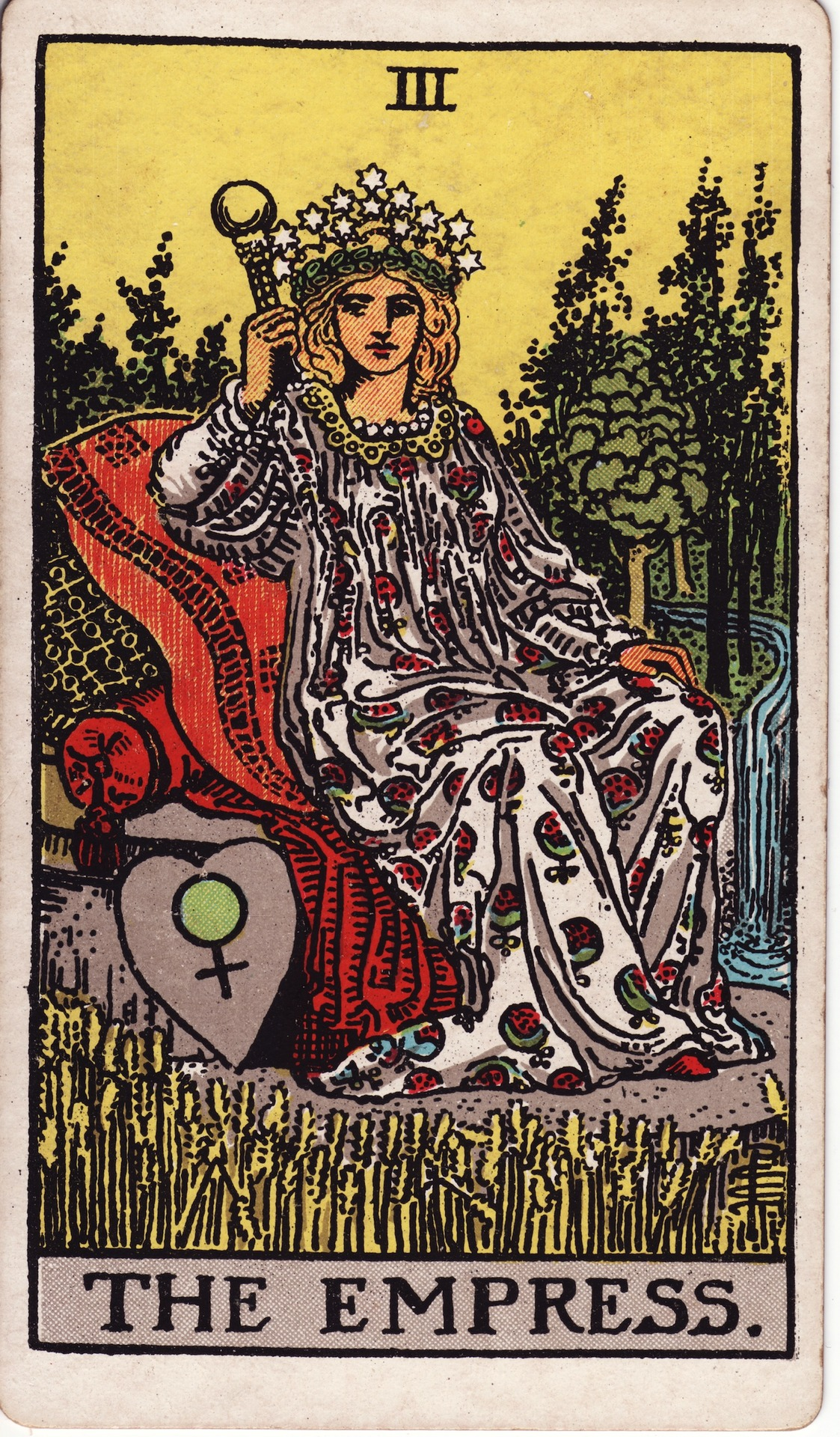
The Empress (III), from the Rider–Waite tarot deck

The Empress (III) is the third trump or Major Arcana card in traditional tarot decks. It is used in card games as well as divination.

== Description and meaning ==
The Empress card in tarot is rich with symbolism and imagery that convey themes of fertility, nurturing, and abundance. She is typically depicted seated on a throne, signifying stability and power, often adorned with motifs underscoring her dominion over nature. Her crown of twelve stars represents her connection to the celestial realm and the zodiac, highlighting her universal influence.

The Empress holds a scepter, symbolizing authority and control over the natural world. A shield with the symbol of Venus by her side reflects her association with the goddess of love, beauty, and creativity, reinforcing themes of fertility and attraction. The lush landscape around her, featuring fields of wheat, rivers, and trees, symbolizes abundance and the nurturing aspects of nature.

Astrologically, the Empress is associated with Venus, enhancing her themes of harmony and nurturing. She is connected to the Earth element, emphasizing her grounding, life-giving qualities, and her role in the physical, material aspects of life. Numerologically, the Empress corresponds to the number three, signifying creativity, growth, and expansion, embodying synthesis and harmony.

In the esoteric tradition, particularly within the Kabbalistic Tree of Life, the Empress is linked to the sephirah of Binah and its path to Chokmah, representing understanding and the nurturing aspect of the divine feminine. Binah, as the Great Mother, gives form and structure to creation, further emphasizing the Empress's role as a life-giving and nurturing force.

== History ==
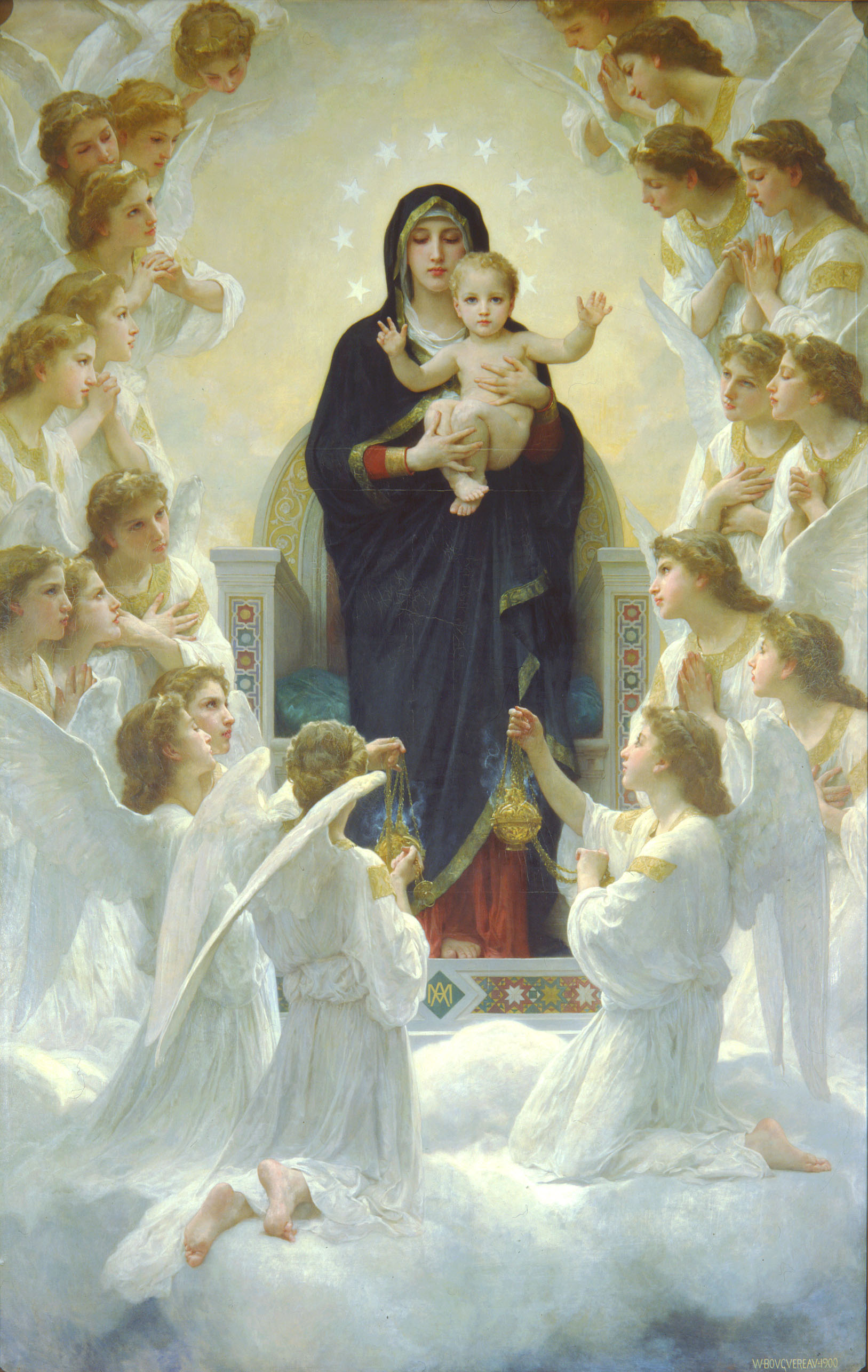
Queen of the Angels by Bouguereau. The Virgin Mary is usually depicted with a twelve star halo, which is derived from Revelation (12:1), describing "a woman clothed with the sun, and the moon under her feet, and upon her head a crown of twelve stars"

The Empress card, one of the Major Arcana in tarot, has evolved significantly since its inception in 15th-century Europe. Initially part of tarot card games like "tarocchi," the Empress was depicted as a regal figure, often crowned and enthroned, symbolizing power and authority.

During the Renaissance, tarot cards began to be associated with mysticism and astrology, with the Empress representing not only temporal power but also the nurturing mother archetype. This period blended classical and Christian symbolism, enriching the card's imagery.

In the 18th century, figures like Antoine Court de Gébelin and Jean-Baptiste Alliette (Etteilla) reinterpreted tarot cards for divination, associating the Empress with the goddess Isis and Kabbalistic symbols. This esoteric tradition emphasized her role in creation and fertility.

In historical decks, the Empress sits on a throne, almost always holding a shield or orb in one hand and a scepter in the other. The shield typically bears an eagle, the heraldic emblem of the Holy Roman Empire. Arthur Edward Waite and the other occultists are responsible for the starry crown, the emblem of Venus, the waterfall, and the vegetation and wildlife.

The 20th century saw the Empress's symbolism refined in influential decks like the Rider-Waite deck, where she is depicted in a lush landscape, embodying nature, creativity, and nurturing.

== Interpretation ==
According to Waite's 1910 book The Pictorial Key to the Tarot, The Empress is the inferior (as opposed to nature's superior) Garden of Eden, the "Earthly Paradise". Waite defines her as a Refugium Peccatorum — a fruitful mother of thousands: "she is above all things universal fecundity and the outer sense of the Word, the repository of all things nurturing and sustaining, and of feeding others."

Waite writes that the card carries these several divinatory associations:

3. THE EMPRESS.--Fruitfulness, action, initiative, length of days; the unknown, clandestine; also difficulty, doubt, ignorance. Reversed: Light, truth, the unraveling of involved matters, public rejoicings; according to another reading, vacillation.
