= Got Talent España season 7 =

Got Talent España
- Season 7
- Presented by: Santi Millán
- Judges: Risto Mejide; Edurne; Dani Martínez
- Winner: Duo Turkeev
- Runner-up: Rey Enigma

Release
- Original network: Telecinco
- Original release: 10 September – 17 December 2021

Season chronology
- ← Previous; Season 6 Next → Season 8

The seventh season of the television program Got Talent España aired on Telecinco from 10 September 2021 to 17 December 2021. The talent competition was once again hosted by Santi Millán and produced by Fremantle. The season featured a judging panel consisting of only three judges—Dani Martínez, Edurne, and Risto Mejide—all returning from the previous season. This came after Paz Padilla, who had only served as a judge during the live shows of Season 6, was announced shortly after the previous season's finale as not returning to the show.

Like the auditions of Season 6, only two "yes" votes were required to send an act through to the next round, while three buzzers would stop a performance. This remains the only season of the show to feature just three judges throughout its entire run. It also recorded lower viewing figures than its predecessors, only leading its timeslot during its premiere and finale. The winner of the seventh season was Risto Mejide's Golden Buzzer act Duo Turkeev, while the runner-up was competitive chess player Rey Enigma. The season achieved an average viewing figure of 1,735,000.

Judges and Presenter for Got Talent España Season 7

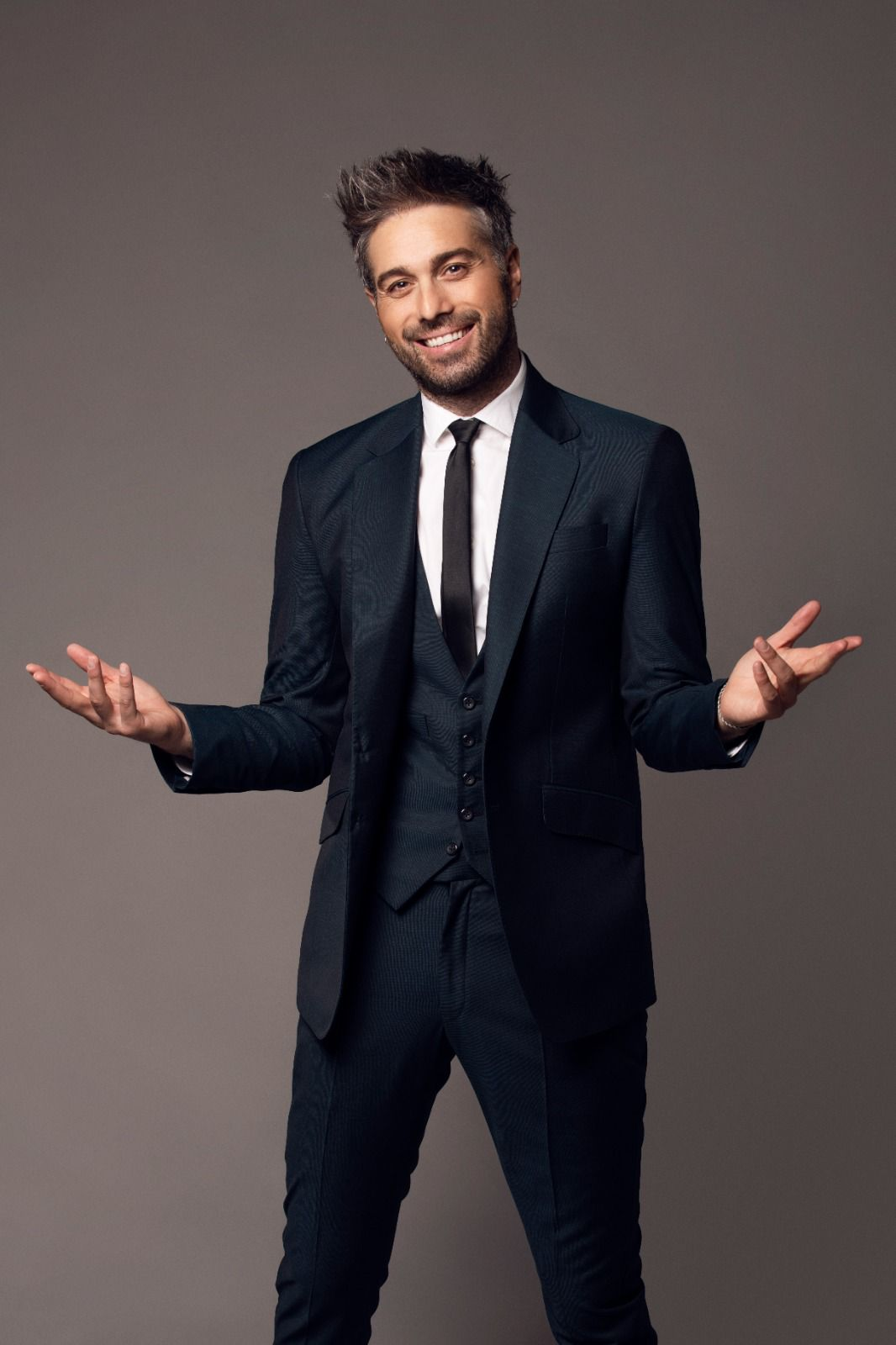
Dani Martínez

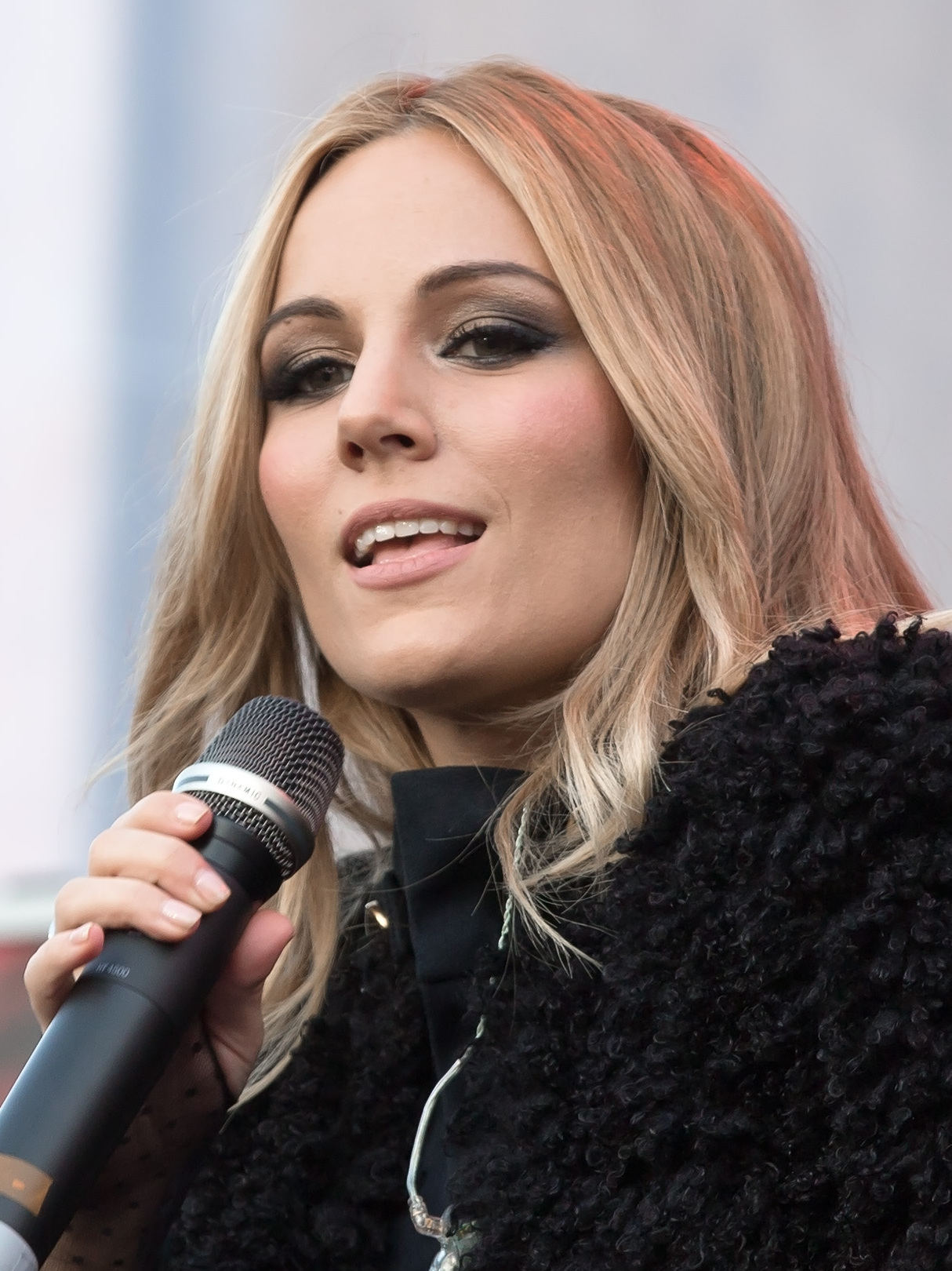
Edurne

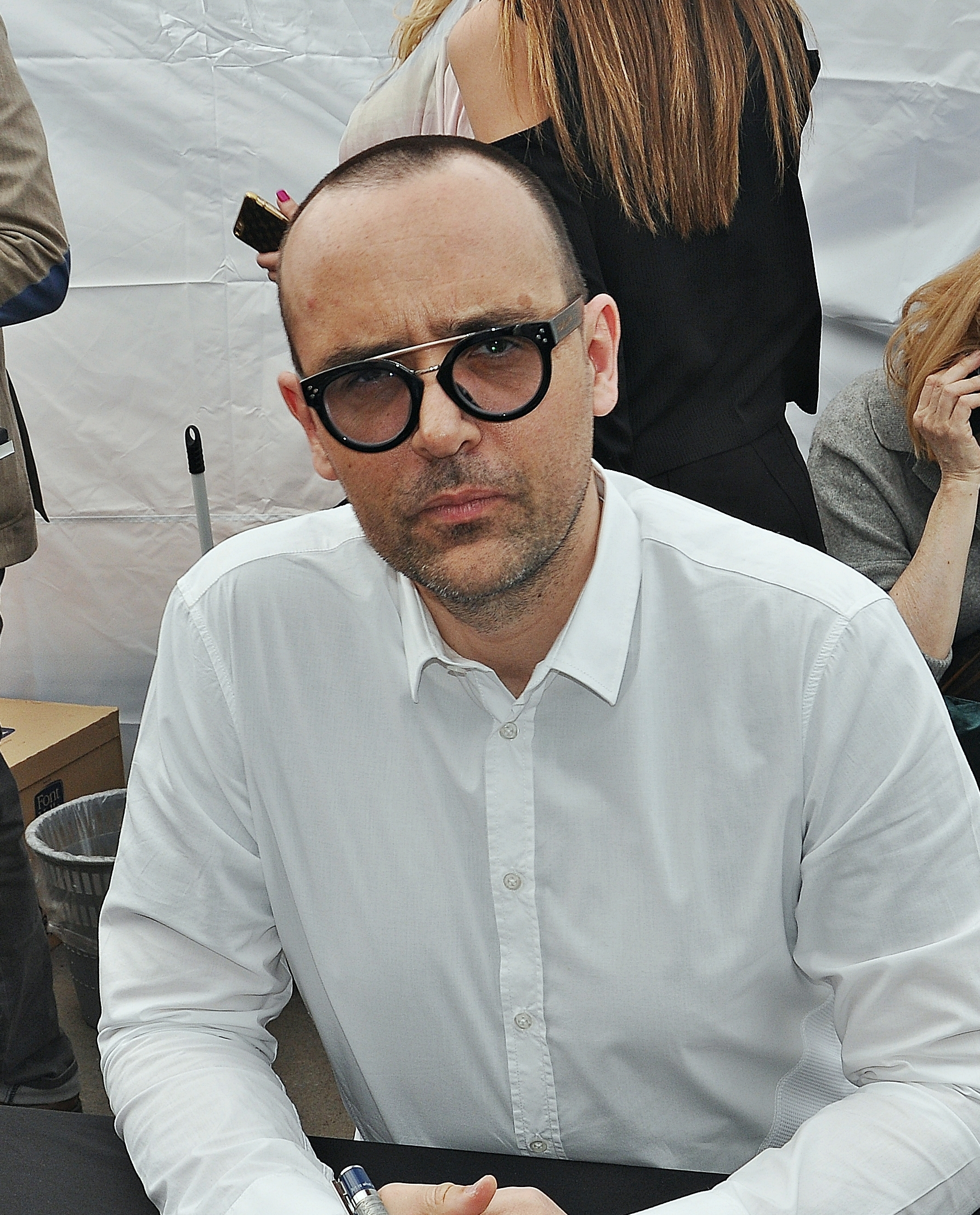
Risto Mejide

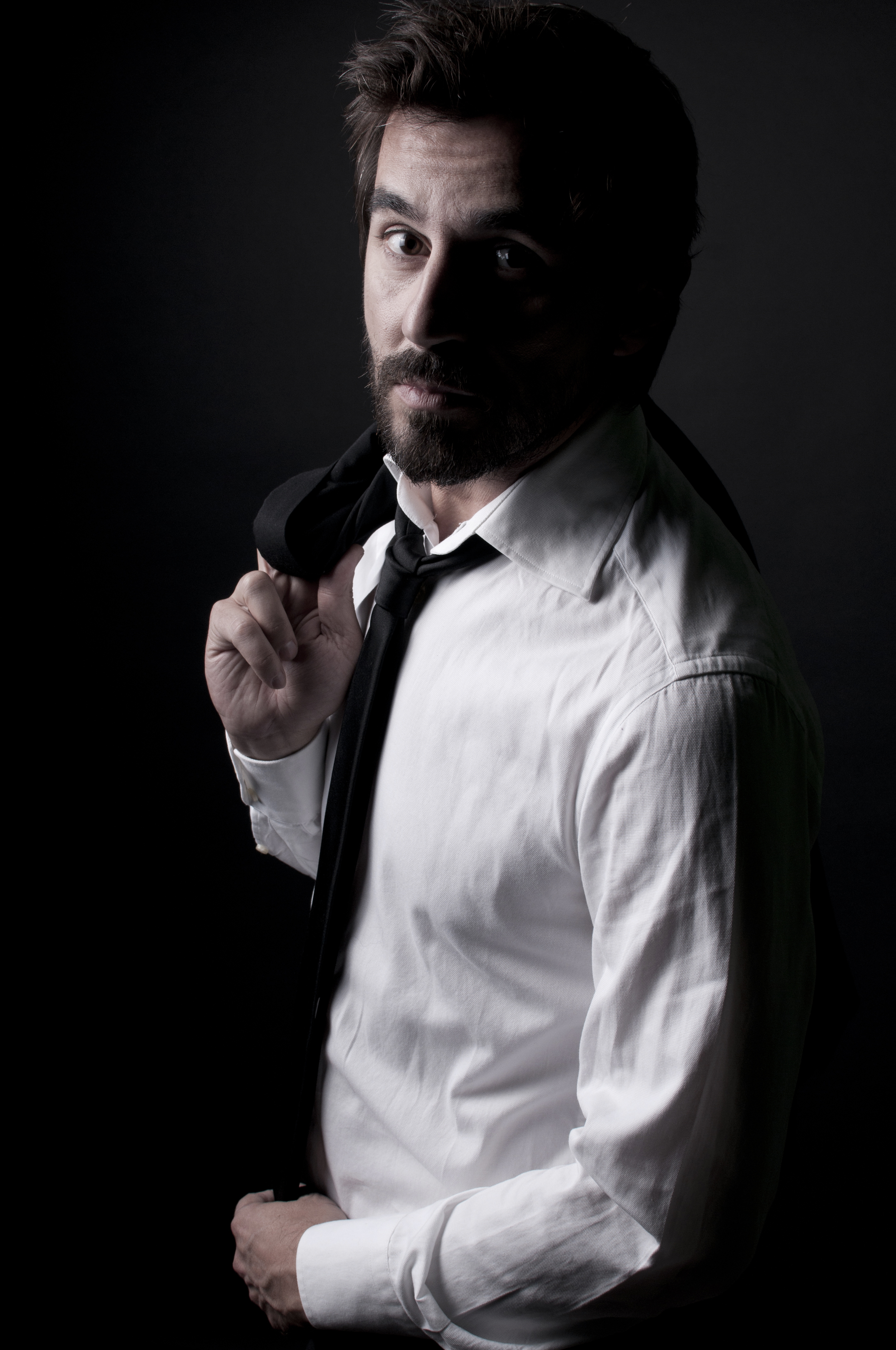
Santi Millán

Jesús Calleja (Guest)

== Format ==
Each judge had the power to press a red buzzer in front of them if they disliked a performance, with three buzzers stopping the act immediately. The Golden Buzzer, situated in the middle of the judges' desk in front of Edurne, allowed each judge, as well as Santi Millán, to send one act directly to the semi-finals. During the semi-finals, the acts performed live for the studio audience, with the judges providing critiques after each performance.

Risto Mejide buzzed the most acts during the live shows, and there was a noticeable increase in buzzer usage throughout the season compared to the previous four seasons, which had only seen between one and three acts buzzed in total. A collective Golden Buzzer was also available during the semi-finals, allowing the judges to unanimously send one standout act directly to the Grand Final. The winner was ultimately decided by the public vote in the Grand Final, earning the title of Spain's most talented act, a cash prize of €25,000, and national recognition.

== Golden Buzzer ==
The Golden Buzzer was used 14 times during the season: Duo Turkeev – Aerial Dance Duo & Eventual Winner (Risto Mejide), Rosa Martínez – Opera Singer (Risto Mejide & Edurne), Jorge Pineda – Singer & Guitarist (Risto Mejide & Dani Martínez in the auditions; Risto Mejide, Edurne & Dani Martínez in the live shows), Laura Diepstratan – Singer & Pianist (Edurne in the auditions; Risto Mejide, Edurne & Dani Martínez in the live shows), Hayford Okine (Edurne & Dani Martínez), Wesley Williams – Unicycle Stunt Performer (Dani Martínez), Maxence Vire – Magician (Risto Mejide, Edurne & Dani Martínez), Barber's Science – Barbershop Quartet (Risto Mejide, Edurne, Dani Martínez & Santi Millán), Silvina Magari – Novelty Singer (Santi Millán), Brodwei – Musical Theatre Group (Risto Mejide & Santi Millán), Centro de Danza Teresa Tessier – Dance Group (Live Shows – Risto Mejide, Edurne & Dani Martínez), Javi Rufo – Magician (Live Shows – Risto Mejide, Edurne & Dani Martínez).

== Season overview ==
Participant	Genre	Act	Semi-final	Finished
6ID	Singing	Girlband	1	Finalist
Alvaro Halley	Singing	Musical Singer	3	Eliminated
Antonio Martinez	Magic	Mentalist	4	Eliminated
Antonio Vargas	Acrobatics	Acrobat	4	Eliminated
Ballart Vikingos	Dance	Viking-themed Dance Group	3	Eliminated
Barber's Science	Singing	Barbershop Quartet	4	Eliminated
Brodwei	Singing	Musical Theatre Group	4	Eliminated
Carlos Voces	Singing	Singer	4	Eliminated
Centro De Danza Teresa Tessier	Dance	Dance Group	2	Finalists
Ceyda Altug Artistic Cycling	Acrobatics	Bike Performer/Acrobat	1	Eliminated
Chiko	Acrobatics	Balancing Acrobat	2	Eliminated
Cia Les Farfadais	Acrobatics	Acrobatic Duo	3	Eliminated
Daniel McDance & Ian So Bad	Dance	Dance Duo	2	Eliminated
Dieguito	Acrobatics	Aerialist	1	Eliminated
Dog Dancing	Animal	Dog Act	3	Finalists
Duo Turkeev	Acrobatics	Aerial Dance Duo	2	Winners
Escuela De Danza & Acrobacia Piramide	Dance	Dance Group	4	Eliminated
Gonzalo Mateos	Magic	Magician	1	Eliminated
Gonzo Tambourine	Music	Tambourine Player	1	Eliminated
Grande Mago	Magic	Comedy Magician	2	Eliminated
Grupo Triana	Dance	Flamenco Dance Group	3	Eliminated
Haizea	Singing	Singer	2	Eliminated
Hayford Okine	Singing	Singer	N/A	Withdrew
Hector Sansegundo	Magic	Hypnotist Magician/Illusionist	3	Eliminated
Holler & Kimberly Zavatta	Danger	Extreme Rollerskating Duo	4	Eliminated
Isaac Costa Blanca	Variety	Singer/Dancer/Entertainer	3	Eliminated
Jaime Gili	Singing	Comedy Singer & Guitarist	3	Eliminated
Javier Botia	Magic	Mentalist	2	Eliminated
Javi Rufo	Magic	Magician	4	Finalist
Joao Paulo	Singing	Opera Singer	2	Finalist
Jonathan Barragan	Magic	Danger Magic Act	2	Eliminated
Jorge Pineda	Singing	Singer & Guitarist	1	3rd Place
Katrina Asfardi	Acrobatics	Contortionist/Aerialist	3	Eliminated
Laura Diepstratan	Singing	Singer & Pianist	3	4th Place
Liliya Turkeieva	Acrobatics	Aerial Acrobat	2	Eliminated
Lola Mendez	Acrobatics	Rollerskating Acrobat	3	Eliminated
Mago Horus	Magic	Card Magician	4	Eliminated
Magic Luna	Magic	Magicienne	1	Finalist
Mariela La Tremendita	Dance	Flamenco Dancer	2	Eliminated
Martina	Dance	Pole Dancer	1	Eliminated
Maxence Vire	Magic	Magician	3	Finalist
Mireia Rebollar	Singing	Musical Theatre Singer	1	Eliminated
Next Level	Dance	Dance Group	1	Eliminated
Nexart Percussion	Variety	Dance & Percussion Group	1	Eliminated
Nina Miro & Asier Bautista	Dance	Ballet Dance Duo	4	Eliminated
Origenes	Dance	Acrobatic Dance Crew	2	Eliminated
Paddy & Nicko	Dance	Salsa Dance Duo	3	Eliminated
Rey Enigma	Variety	Competitive Chess Player	4	2nd Place
Rosa Martinez	Singing	Opera Singer	1	Eliminated
Samuel LSC	Singing	Rapper	2	Eliminated
Sergio Perez	Dance	Dancer	4	Finalist
Silvina Magari	Variety	Novelty Singer	2	Eliminated
Team Spotlight	Dance	Dance Troupe	1	Eliminated
Trixie Zavatta	Variety	Swegway Performer, Contortionist & Aerialist	4	Eliminated
Virginia Mos	Singing	Singer & Guitarist	3	Eliminated
Wesley Williams	Danger	Unicycle Stunt Performer	N/A	Withdrew
Zeno Sputafuoco	Variety	Sideshow Act	1	Eliminated

=== Semi-Finals summary ===
Buzzed Out | Live Golden Buzzer | Advanced to Finals (Golden Buzzer) | Advanced to Finals (Public Vote Winner) | Eliminated (Top 4 - Lost Judges' Choice)

==== Semi-final 1 (19 November) ====
Guest Judge: Jesús Calleja

The Judges collectively decided that Jorge Pineda deserved a Group Golden Buzzer, therefore only 1 act moved on via public vote, and 1 act moved on via the judges' vote (the judges also had 3 acts to choose from instead of 2).

Jesús Calleja was a temporary Guest Judge during this semi-final, and sat in between Edurne & Martínez. He did not have a red buzzer, however took part in giving feedback to the acts, and pressing the Golden Buzzer. He left the panel before the results.^{3}

Semi-Finalist	Order	Performance Type	Buzzes and Judges' Vote			Result
Semi-Finalist	Order	Performance Type	Mejide	Edurne	Martínez	Result
Team Spotlight	1	Dance Troupe				Eliminated
Mireia Rebollar	2	Musical Theatre Singer				Eliminated
Dieguito	3	Aerialist				Eliminated
Gonzalo Mateos	4	Magician				Eliminated
Gonzo Tambourine	5	Tambourine Player	Buzzed Out	^{1}	^{1}	Eliminated
6ID	6	Girlband				Advanced
Next Level	7	Dance Group				Eliminated (Judges' Vote Tied - Lost by Public Vote)
Jorge Pineda	8	Singer & Guitarist	Live Golden Buzzer	Live Golden Buzzer	Live Golden Buzzer	Golden Buzzer Advancement
Ceyda Altug Artistic Cycling	9	Bike Performer/Acrobat				Eliminated
Martina^{2}	10	Pole Dancer				Eliminated
Rosa Martinez	11	Opera Singer				Eliminated (Judges' Vote Tied - Lost by Public Vote)
Magic Luna	12	Magicienne				Advanced (Judges' Vote Tied - Won by Public Vote)
Nexart Percussion	13	Dance & Percussion Group				Eliminated
Zeno Sputafuoco	14	Sideshow Act	Buzzed Out			Eliminated

- ^1 Risto Mejide pressed both Edurne & Martinez's buzzers, stopping the performance, and claimed there was no place for Gonzo in the semi-final. After Santi Milan allowed Gonzo to carry on his performance, Mejide stormed off set. He later returned to give comments, where he mocked the idea of giving Gonzo a Golden Buzzer.
- ^2 After Jesús Calleja attempted to imitate Martina's performance on the pole, Risto Mejide jokingly pressed the Golden Buzzer.
- ^3 Dani Martínez jokingly pressed both his and Edurne's buzzers after Jesús Calleja got lost onstage, trying to find which way the exit was.

==== Semi-final 2 (26 November) ====
The Judges collectively decided that Centro De Danza Teresa Tessier deserved a Group Golden Buzzer, therefore only 1 act moved on via public vote, and 1 act moved on via the judges' vote (the judges also had 3 acts to choose from instead of 2).

Semi-Finalist	Order	Performance Type	Buzzes and Judges' Vote			Result
Semi-Finalist	Order	Performance Type	Mejide	Edurne	Martínez	Result
Origenes	1	Acrobatic Dance Crew				Eliminated
Joao Paulo	2	Opera Singer				Advanced (Won Judges' Vote)
Javier Botia	3	Mentalist				Eliminated (Lost Judges' Vote)
Liliya Turkeieva	4	Aerial Acrobat				Eliminated
Centro De Danza Teresa Tessier	5	Dance Group	Live Golden Buzzer	Live Golden Buzzer	Live Golden Buzzer	Golden Buzzer Advancement
Chiko	6	Balancing Acrobat				Eliminated
Mariela La Tremendita	7	Flamenco Dancer				Eliminated
Samuel LSC	8	Rapper				Eliminated
Jonathan Barragan	9	Danger Magic Act	Buzzed Out		^{4}	Eliminated
Duo Turkeev	10	Aerial Dance Duo				Advanced
Grande Mago	11	Comedy Magician				Eliminated
Haizea	12	Singer				Eliminated
Daniel McDance & Ian So Bad	13	Dance Duo				Eliminated
Silvina Magari	14	Novelty Singer				Eliminated (Lost Judges' Vote)

- ^4 Risto Mejide pressed Dani Martínez's buzzer, due to his protests about Martínez taking part in Barragan's act, and attempting the firewalk.

==== Semi-final 3 (3 December) ====
The Judges collectively decided that Laura Diepstratan deserved a Group Golden Buzzer, therefore only 1 act moved on via public vote, and 1 act moved on via the judges' vote (the judges also had 3 acts to choose from instead of 2).

Semi-Finalist	Order	Performance Type	Buzzes and Judges' Vote			Result
Semi-Finalist	Order	Performance Type	Mejide	Edurne	Martínez	Result
Paddy & Nicko	1	Salsa Dance Duo				Eliminated
Hector Sansegundo	2	Hypnotist Magician/Illusionist				Eliminated
Virginia Mos	3	Singer & Guitarist				Eliminated
Dog Dancing	4	Dog Act				Advanced
Lola Mendez	5	Rollerskating Acrobat				Eliminated
Grupo Triana	6	Flamenco Dance Group				Eliminated (Lost Judges' Vote)
Alvaro Halley	7	Musical Singer				Eliminated
Katrina Asfardi	8	Contortionist/Aerialist				Eliminated
Jaime Gili	9	Comedy Singer & Guitarist				Eliminated
Ballart Vikingos	10	Viking-themed Dance Group				Eliminated
Maxence Vire	11	Magician	^{5}			Advanced (Won Judges' Vote)
Laura Diepstratan	12	Singer & Pianist	Live Golden Buzzer	Live Golden Buzzer	Live Golden Buzzer	Golden Buzzer Advancement
Cia Les Farfadais	13	Acrobatic Duo	Buzzed Out			Eliminated
Isaac Costa Blanca	14	Singer/Dancer/Entertainer	^{6}			Eliminated (Lost Judges' Vote)

- ^5 Risto Mejide's buzzer was jokingly pressed by Dani Martínez, however wasn't removed.
- ^6 *Risto Mejide's buzzer was pressed by Dani Martínez on his behalf.

==== Semi-final 4 (10 December) ====
Guest Performance: Edurne^{7}

Edurne gave a guest performance at the start of the show. Hayford Okine (Edurne & Dani Martinez's Duo Golden Buzzer) could not participate in this show as he was scheduled to, due to health reasons, leaving only 13 contestants instead of the usual 14.

The Judges collectively decided that Javi Rufo deserved a Group Golden Buzzer, therefore only 1 act moved on via public vote, and 1 act moved on via the judges' vote (the judges also had 3 acts to choose from instead of 2).

Semi-Finalist	Order	Performance Type	Buzzes and Judges' Vote			Result
Semi-Finalist	Order	Performance Type	Mejide	Edurne	Martínez	Result
Holler & Kimberly Zavatta	1	Extreme Rollerskating Duo				Eliminated (Lost Judges' Vote)
Mago Horus	2	Card Magician	^{8}			Eliminated
Nina Miro & Asier Bautista	3	Ballet Dance Duo				Eliminated
Brodwei	4	Musical Theatre Group				Eliminated (Lost Judges' Vote)
Trixie Zavatta	5	Swegway Performer, Contortionist & Aerialist				Eliminated
Carlos Voces	6	Singer				Eliminated
Sergio Perez^{9}	7	Dancer				Advanced (Won Judges' Vote)
Antonio Martinez	8	Mentalist				Eliminated
Escuela De Danza & Acrobacia Piramide	9	Dance Group				Eliminated
Antonio Vargas	10	Acrobat				Eliminated
Javi Rufo	11	Magician	Live Golden Buzzer	Live Golden Buzzer	Live Golden Buzzer	Golden Buzzer Advancement
Rey Enigma	12	Competitive Chess Player				Advanced
Barber's Science	13	Barbershop Quartet				Eliminated

- ^7 Mejide and Martínez jokingly pressed their buzzers at the end of Edurne's guest performance.
- ^8 Mejide's buzzer was pressed by Martínez on his behalf.
- ^9 *Mejide requested that Sergio perform his routine again, to prove that he wasn't just improvising, and that it was actually choreographed. A side by side comparison was shown, proving him to perform the exact same routine seamlessly.

=== Finals summary ===
Buzzed Out | Winner |

==== Grand Final (17 December) ====
Of the 12 acts that had made it to the final, 6 of them were Golden Buzzer acts - Laura Diepstratan, Duo Turkeev, Maxence Vire, Jorge Pineda, Centro De Danza Teresa Tessier & Javi Rufo. Duo Turkeev (Mejide's Golden Buzzer) would later win the show.

Chess grandmaster Anatoly Karpov made a guest appearance during the final to play Rey Enigma (who would usually play Risto Mejide, as he had done in the previous rounds). The game ended in a draw, and Enigma was announced as Runner-Up.

Semi-Finalist	Order	Performance Type	Buzzes and Judges' Vote			Result
Semi-Finalist	Order	Performance Type	Mejide	Edurne	Martínez	Result
Laura Diepstratan	1	Singer & Pianist				4th Place
Dog Dancing	2	Dog Act				7th - Eliminated
Duo Turkeev	3	Aerial Dance Duo				1st - Winner
Maxence Vire	4	Magician				6th - Eliminated
Jorge Pineda	5	Singer & Guitarist				3rd Place
Centro De Danza Teresa Tessier	6	Dance Group				9th - Eliminated
Javi Rufo	7	Magician				5th - Eliminated
6ID	8	Girlband	Buzzed Out			12th - Eliminated
Joao Paulo	9	Opera Singer				10th - Eliminated
Magic Luna	10	Magicienne				11th - Eliminated
Sergio Perez	11	Dancer				8th - Eliminated
Rey Enigma	12	Competitive Chess Player				2nd Place

== Ratings ==
Order	Episode	Viewers (millions)	Share
1	"Auditions 1: Dani's Golden Buzzer"	1.88	18.4%
2	"Auditions 2: Risto & Edurne's Golden Buzzer"	1.42	13.2%
3	"Auditions 3: Judges' Group Golden Buzzer"	1.32	12.3%
4	"Auditions 4: Edurne's Golden Buzzer/Risto's Golden Buzzer"	1.53	14.2%
5	"Auditions 5: Edurne & Dani's Golden Buzzer"	1.67	16.0%
6	"Auditions 6: Risto & Dani's Golden Buzzer"	1.67	15.3%
7	"Auditions 7: Santi's Golden Buzzer"	1.85	16.5%
8	"Auditions 8: Collective Group Golden Buzzer"	1.76	15.5%
9	"Auditions 9: Risto & Santi's Golden Buzzer"	1.74	15.3%
10	"Auditions 10: Risto & Dani's Joke Golden Buzzer"	1.91	16.4%
11	"Semi-Final 1"	1.75	15.9%
12	"Semi-Final 2"	1.90	16.0%
13	"Semi-Final 3"	1.80	16.2%
14	"Semi-Final 4"	1.81	15.4%
15	"Grand Final"	2.18	20.3%
