= Cristina Ramos =

Cristina Ramos may refer to:

- Cristina Ramos-Jalasco, Filipino sports executive and former international footballer
- Cristina Ramos (singer), Spanish singer, winner of Got Talent España in 2016

== See also ==
- María Cristina Ramos (disambiguation)
