= Eva Isanta =

Spanish actress

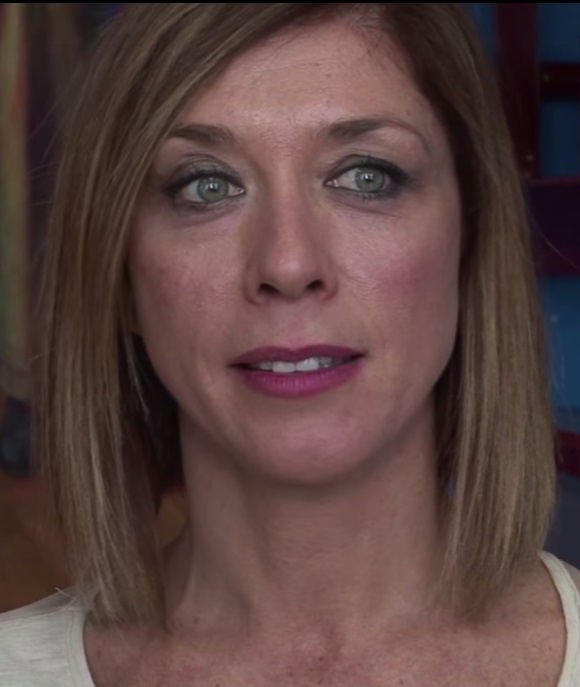
- Isanta in 2015
- Born: Eva María Isanta Foncuberta; June 19, 1971 (age 54); Ceuta, Spain
- Occupation: Actress
- Years active: 1991–present
- Known for: Aquí no hay quien viva La que se avecina

Eva María Isanta Foncuberta (born 19 June 1971) is a Spanish actress, known mostly for her roles as Beatriz Villarejo in Aquí no hay quien viva, and Maite Figueroa in La que se avecina.

She debuted on 31 October 1990 playing Inés in Don Juan Tenorio. From 1991 to 1992 she played Sara in Trescientos veintiuno, trescientos veintidós, by Ana Diosdado. In 1997 she performed with Ramón Langa and Paca Gabaldón in Asesino (2000), directed by Ricard Reguant. On 5 August 2011 she appeared with Pablo Carbonell, Marina San José and Carlos Heredia in Venecia bajo la nieve, by Gilles Dyrek and directed by Gabriel Olivares.

In 2017 she was awarded by the Premio Festival MIM Series for the best female performance in a comedy.

In 2019 she was cast to the Spanish TV programme Got Talent España with Risto Mejide, Jorge Javier Vázquez and Edurne.

== Filmography ==
=== Films ===
- Ellos (2017)
- Fe (2017) as Noelia
- Hada (2015) as Hada
- Decrescendo (2013)
- Padres (2011)
- Penalty (2006)
- Amores circulares (2004) as Mujer II
- El dolor y la lluvia (2003)
- Licántropo: El asesino de la luna llena (1997) as Kinga Daninsky
- Don Juan itinerante (1991) as Doña Inés

=== TV series ===
- Counting Worms: Memories of a Zombie Family as Mother
- La que se avecina (2007-2020) as Maite Figueroa
- El hombre de tu vida (2016) as Julieta
- Aquí no hay quien viva (2004-2006) as Bea Villarejo
- Ana y los 7 (2003)
- La vida de Rita (2003) as Chincheta
- Hospital Central (2002) as Clara
- Desenlace (2002)
- Jacinto Durante, representante (2000) María
- Petra Delicado (1999)
- Compañeros (1998) as Gemma
- Pasen y vean (1997)
- Colegio mayor (1994-1996) as Irene San Martín
- Por fin solos (1995) as Marisa
- Farmacia de guardia (1992-1995) as Isabel Segura Cano
- Aquí hay negocio (1995)
- Villa Rosaura (1994) as Lolita
- ¡Por fin solos! as (1994) Marisa
- Habitación 503 (1993)
