= Got Talent España =

- Created by: Simon Cowell
- Presented by: Santi Millán
- Judges: Edurne; Jorge Javier Vázquez; Eva Hache; Jesús Vázquez; Risto Mejide; Paz Padilla; Eva Isanta; Dani Martínez; Paula Echevarría; Florentino Fernández; Tamara Falcó; Carlos Latre; Lorena Castell; Xuso Jones

Production
- Producer: FremantleMedia
- Running time: 180 minutes
- Production companies: FremantleMedia; Syco TV

Original release
- Network: Telecinco
- Release: 13 February 2016 – present

Related
- Got Talent: All-Stars; Got Talent: Fantasy League

Got Talent España (Spanish for 'Spain's Got Talent') is a televised Spanish talent show competition, which premiered on 13 February 2016, part of the global Got Talent franchise created by Simon Cowell. The show was originally presented by Presented by Santi Millán and is produced by Syco Entertainment, distributed by Fremantle. The show is broadcast on Telecinco every year starting in 2016, excluding 2020 and 2025. in late Spring to early Summer.

The show is a continuation of the original series, Tienes Talento, which aired one season in 2008.

The success of the show has led to a spin-off following the Got Talent España season 8, titled Got Talent: All-Stars, broadcasting in 2023 following the success of the American edition's spin-off America's Got Talent: All-Stars. On 10 June 2026, Mediaset España announced the show would pick up another spin-off, Got Talent: Fantasy League, which is based on the American edition, America's Got Talent: Fantasy League.

== Format ==
=== Auditions ===
Each season, contestants of any age may audition with any talent they wish to present. During auditions, performers attempt to impress a panel of judges – currently consisting of Paula Echevarría, Carlos Latre, Lorena Castell, and Xuso Jones – in order to progress to the live rounds of the competition.

Judges are equipped with red buzzers, which they may press to signal disapproval of an act. If all judges press their buzzers, the performance is automatically stopped. Following each audition, the judges discuss the performance and vote either "yes" or "no". Contestants typically require a majority of "yes" votes (three or more) to advance to the next round, although in season 7 only two "yes" votes were required.

=== Deliberations ===
Deliberations are an untelevised stage in which the judges review the acts that received sufficient "yes" votes during auditions and select a reduced number of contestants to advance to the semi-final stage.

=== Semi-finals and Final ===
Contestants perform in live shows, aiming to secure votes from both the judges and the public in order to reach the final and compete for a cash prize of €25,000. As of 2026, the programme has produced 11 winners, featuring a wide range of acts including singers, instrumentalists, dancers, magicians, comedians, and variety performers.

In season 2, a Golden Buzzer was introduced for the semi-final stage, allowing the judges to collectively select standout acts during live shows. From 2024 onwards, each judge was assigned an individual Golden Buzzer for use during the semi-finals.

=== Golden Buzzer ===
The "Golden Buzzer" in the auditions is allowed to be used by the judges and presenter which sends an act directly through to the semi-finals, in season one each of them could only press it once. In season 2, judges could give one golden buzzer, and one as a pair with another judge. In season 3, the judges were allowed to give a golden buzzer collectively as a group. In season 4, the judges and the presenter were allowed to give a collective golden buzzer. In season 7, the presenter was allowed to give a golden buzzer as a pair with another judge. In season 9, judges and presenters could no longer give golden buzzers as a pair. In season 10, the group golden buzzer with the judges and the presenter was replaced with the "Platinum Buzzer" sending an act straight to the finale.

The "Golden Buzzer" was introduced in the semi-finals in season 2. The judges decide as a group whether to press it or not, with that act going straight to the finale, if pressed. In season 10, one judge was assigned the golden buzzer each semi-final.

== Tienes Talento ==
The original series was hosted by Nuria Roca (also the host of Factor X), with Eduardo Aldán as backstage host. Actress Natalia Millán, music conductor Josep Vicent, and singer-songwriter David Summers were the three original judges. Summers appeared only in the first episode and left the show prematurely due to pneumonia; he was replaced by singer and musician Miqui Puig (also a judge on Factor X) for the rest of the season. On 21 April 2008, 16-year-old flamenco singer Salva Rodríguez won the finale with 23 percent of the televote.

== Judges and presenters ==
Since the programme’s debut in 2016, Got Talent España has featured a judging panel composed primarily of television personalities, comedians, and entertainers, with Santi Millán serving as presenter throughout all editions.

The original judging panel consisted of Jesús Vázquez, Jorge Javier Vázquez, Eva Hache, and Edurne. In the second season, Risto Mejide replaced Vázquez. From the fourth season in 2019, Hache and Javier Vázquez left the show being replaced by Eva Isanta and Paz Padilla. Dani Martínez joined in the fifth season, replacing Isanta.

In season 7, Padilla left the show, it continued with only three judges. The following season returned to four judges, with Paula Echevarría joining the panel. Florentino Fernández replaced Martínez in the ninth season. In 2024, Edurne departed the programme and was replaced by Tamara Falcó for the tenth season, alongside returning judges Mejide and Echevarría.

In 2025 it was announced, Carlos Latre and Lorena Castell both joined the show replacing Fernández and Falcó respectively. In late 2024, Mejide announced that the eleventh season would be his last. Latre, Castell and Echevarría returning alongside new judge, Xuso Jones. The four will also judge the new spin-off, Got Talent: Fantasy League.

=== Overview ===
Colour key

Host
Judge

Cast member	Series											
Cast member	1 2016	2 2017	3 2018	4 2019	5 2019	6 2021	7 2021	8 2022	9 2023	10 2024	11 2026	12 2027
Santi Millán	●	●	●	●	●	●	●	●	●	●	●	●
Edurne	●	●	●	●	●	●	●	●	●			
Jorge Javier Vázquez	●	●	●									
Eva Hache	●	●	●									
Jesús Vázquez	●											
Risto Mejide		●	●	●	●	●	●	●	●	●	●	
Paz Padilla (Note: Padilla was not present for auditions in the sixth series due to the death of her husband; she served as a judge for the live shows only.)				●	●	●						
Eva Isanta				●								
Dani Martínez					●	●	●	●				
Paula Echevarría								●	●	●	●	●
Florentino Fernández									●	●		
Tamara Falcó										●		
Carlos Latre											●	●
Lorena Castell											●	●
Xuso Jones												●

=== Judges ===
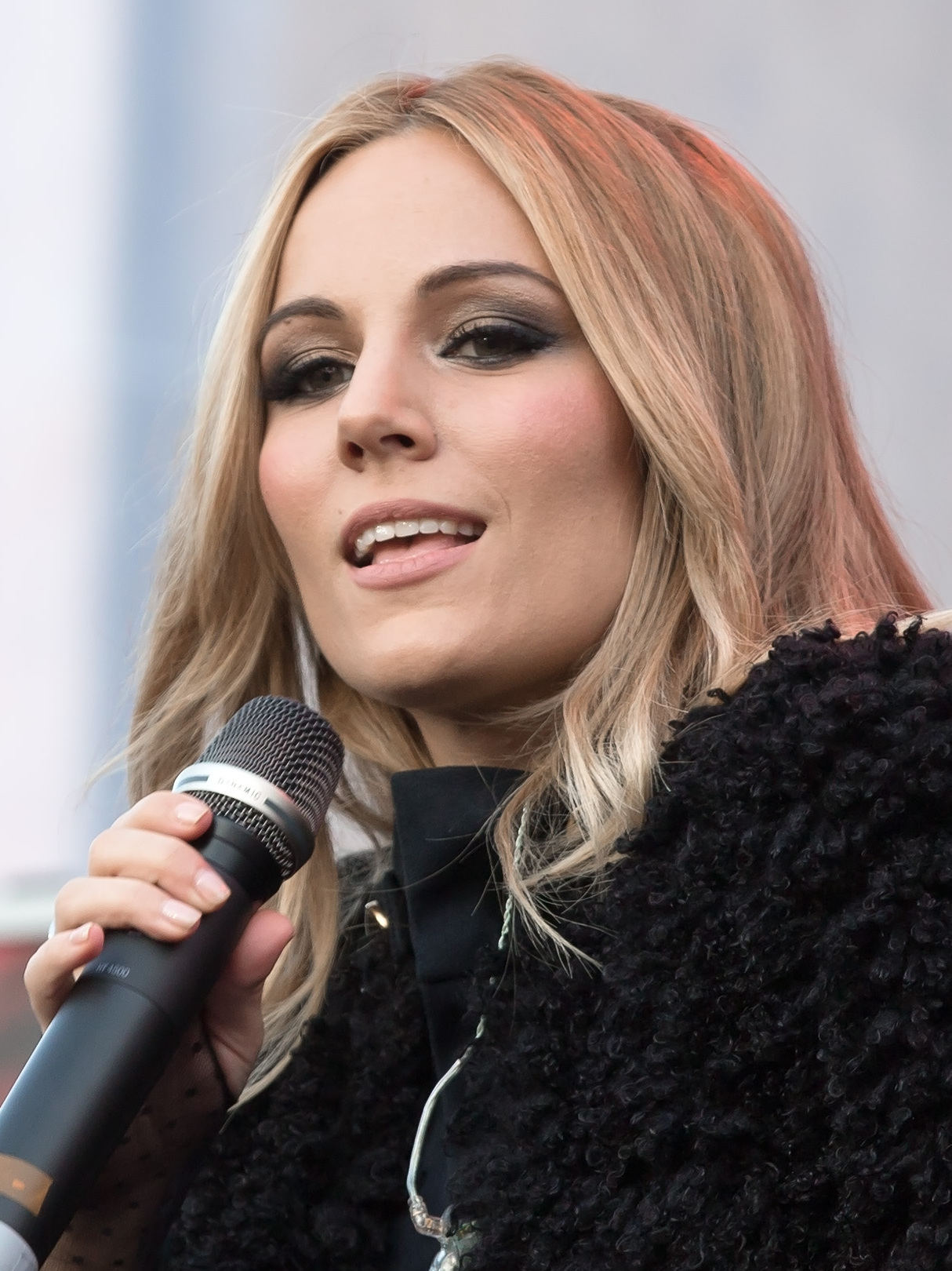
Edurne (1–9)

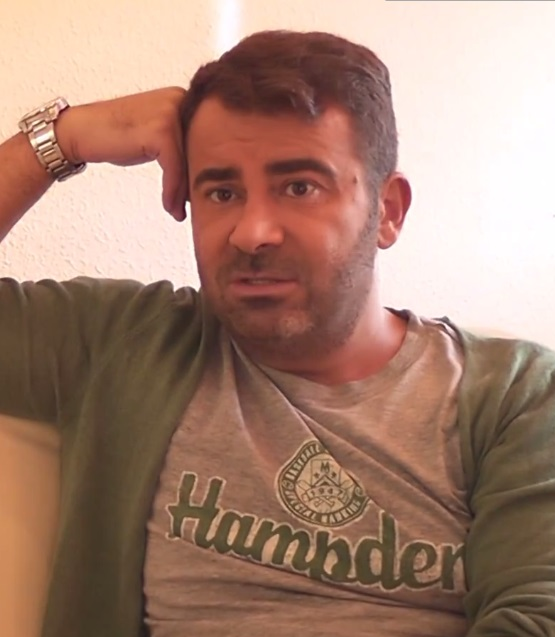
Jorge Javier Vázquez (1–3)

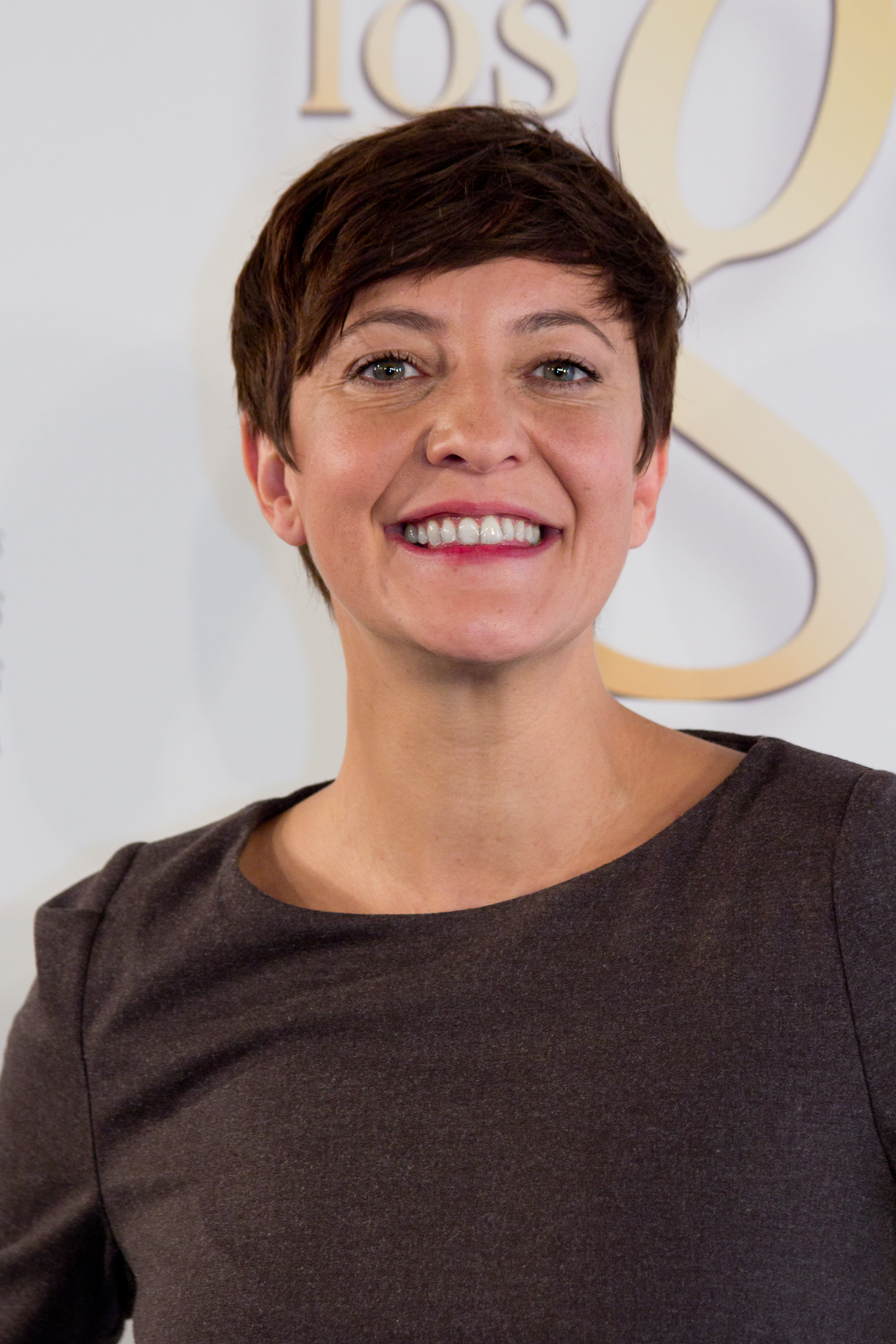
Eva Hache (1–3)

Jesús Vázquez (1)

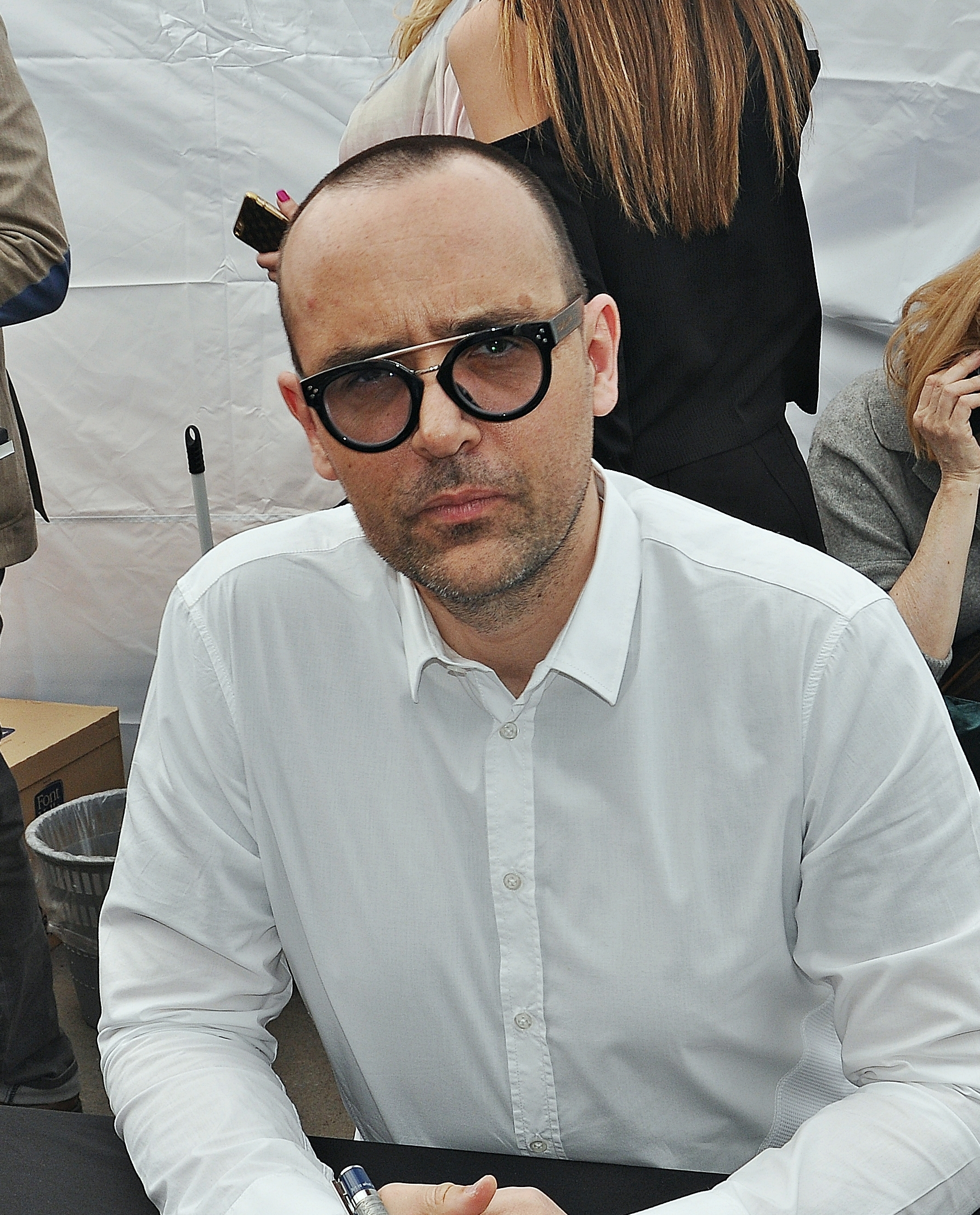
Risto Mejide (2–11)

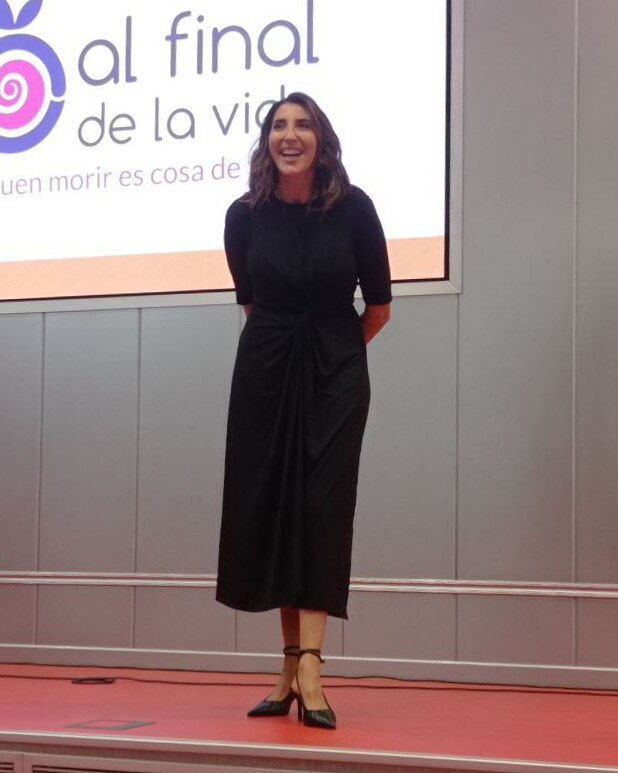
Paz Padilla (4–6)

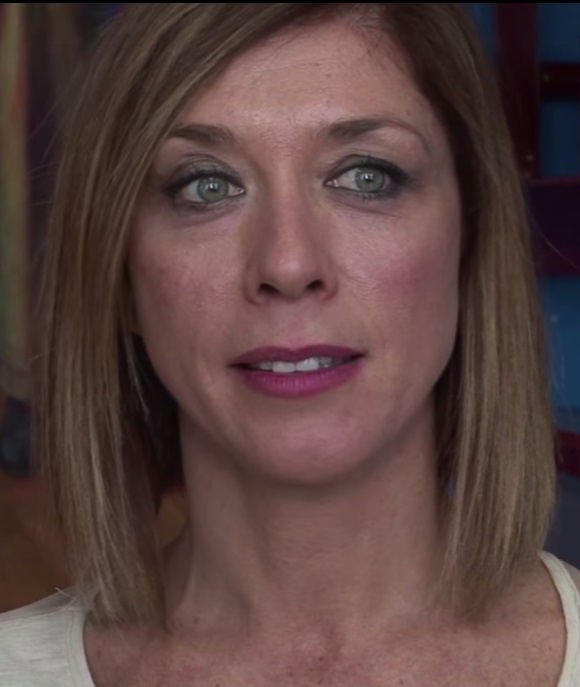
Eva Isanta (4)

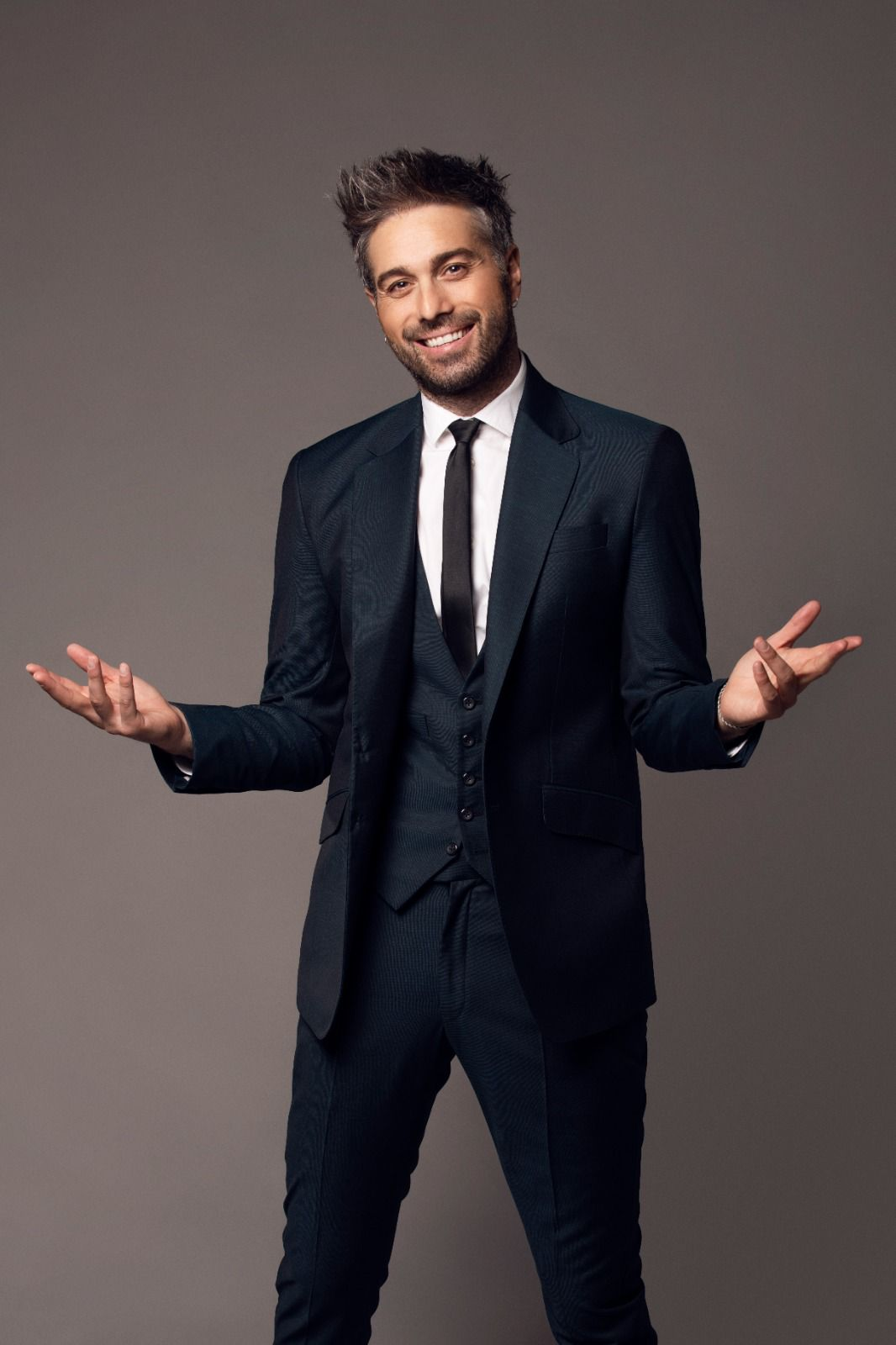
Dani Martínez (5–8)

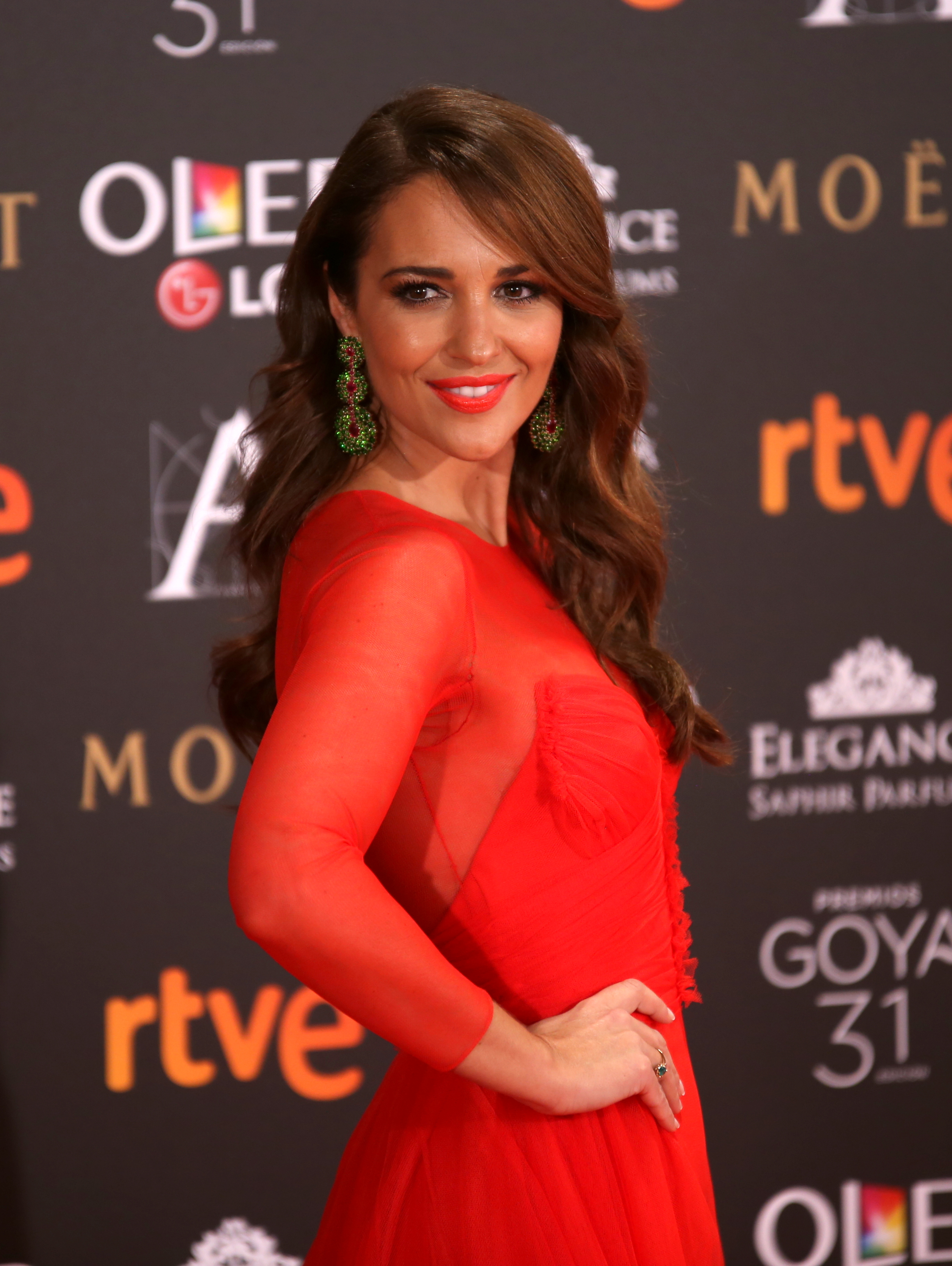
Paula Echevarría
(8–11, upcoming in 12)

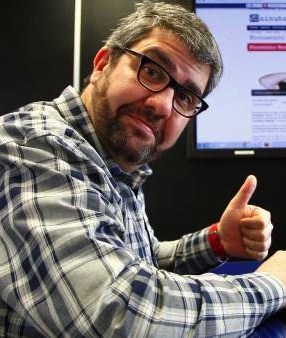
Florentino Fernández
(9–10)

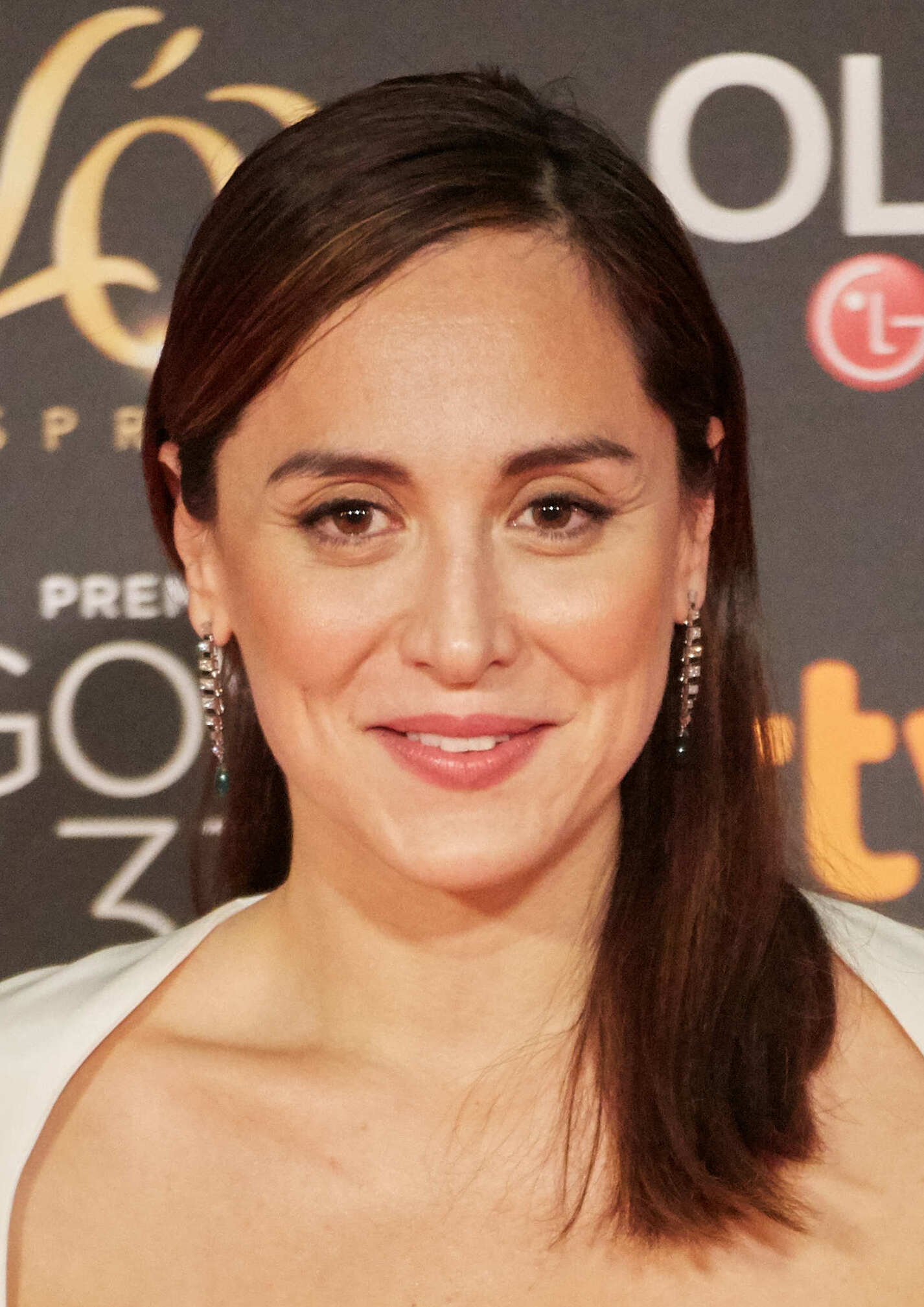
Tamara Falcó
(10)

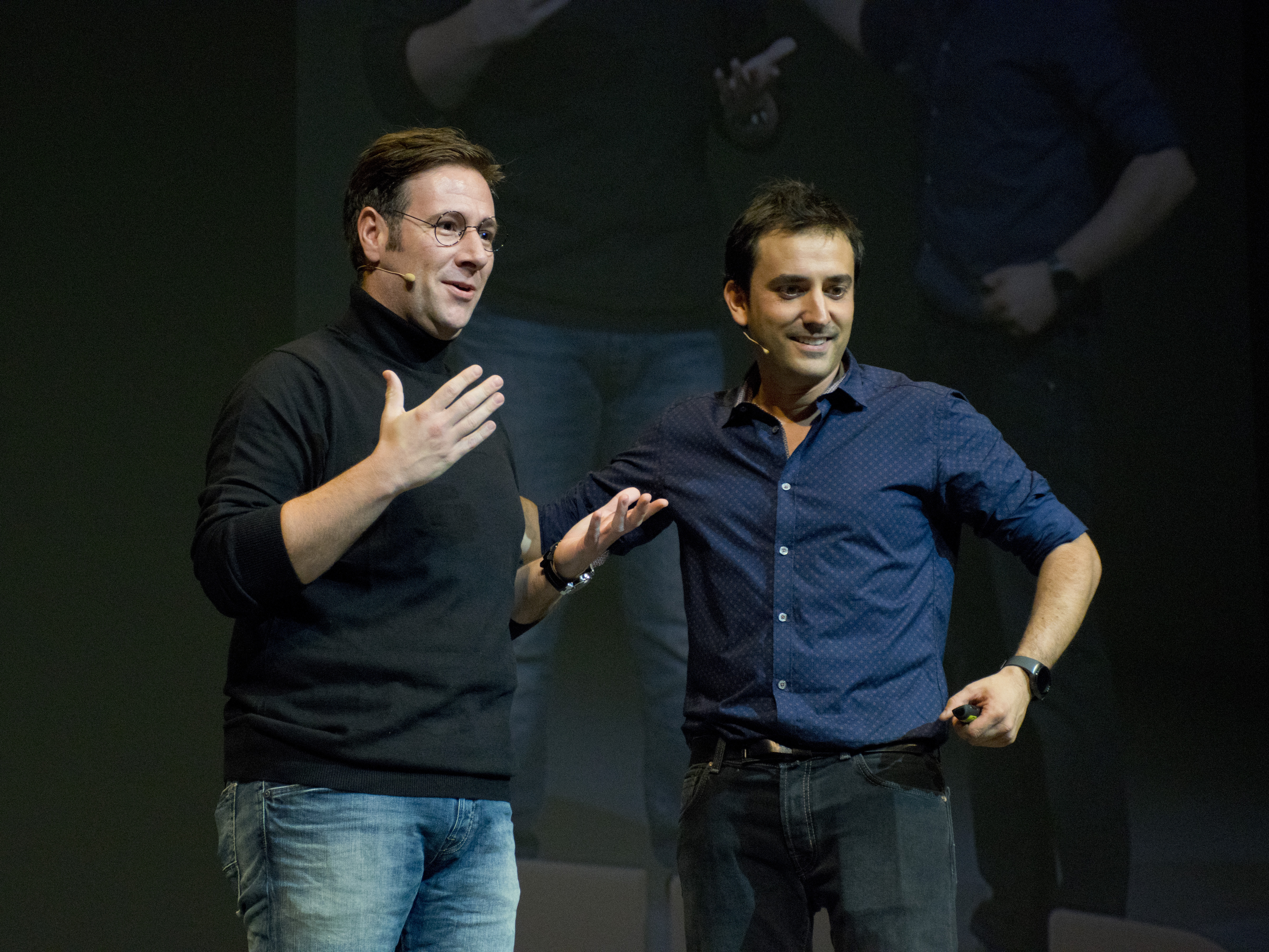
Carlos Latre (left)
(11, upcoming in 12)

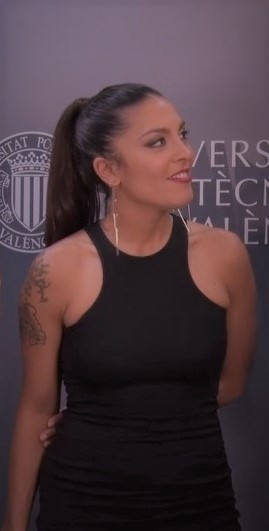
Lorena Castell
(11, upcoming in 12)

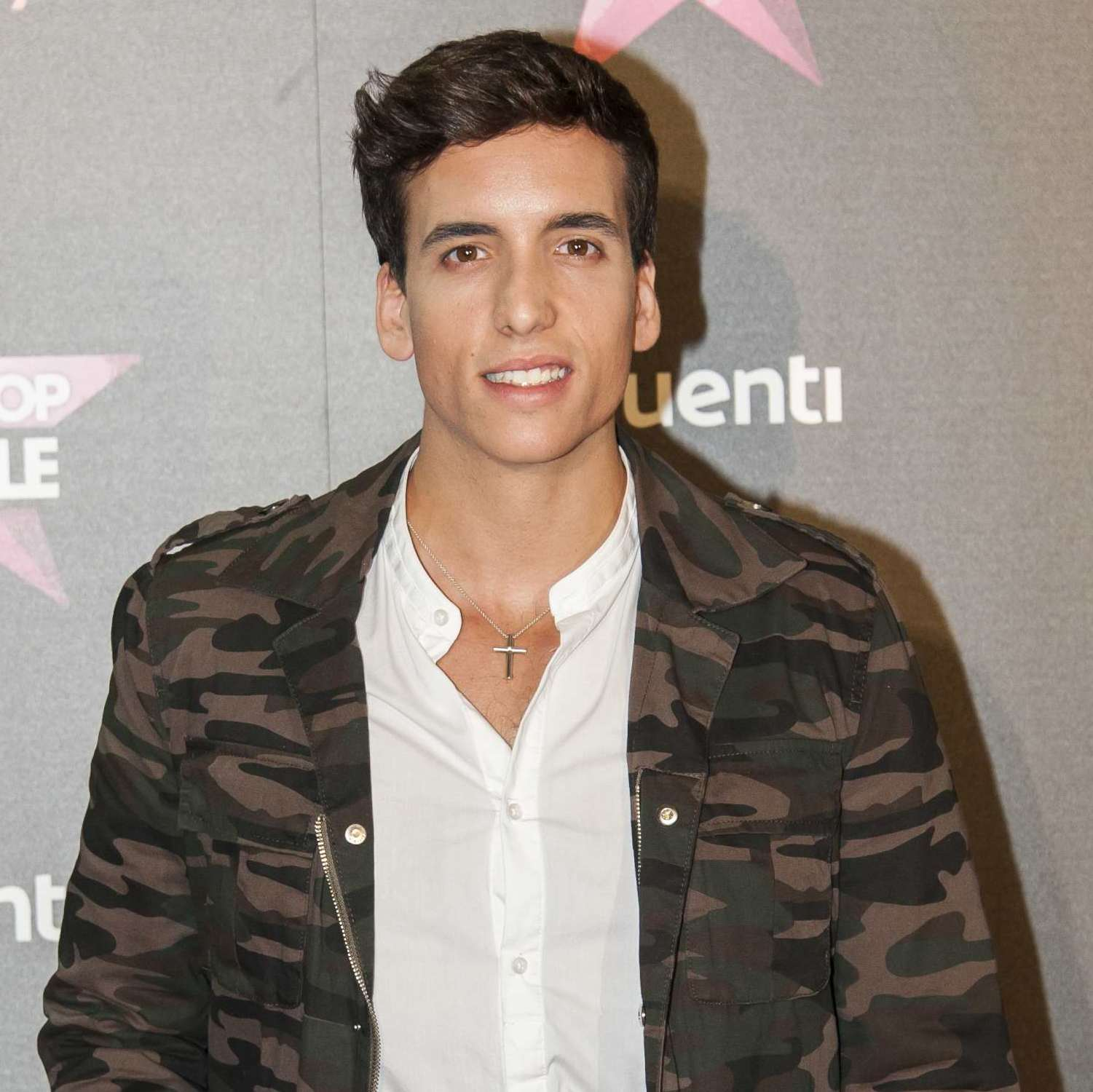
Xuso Jones
(upcoming in 12)

=== Presenters ===
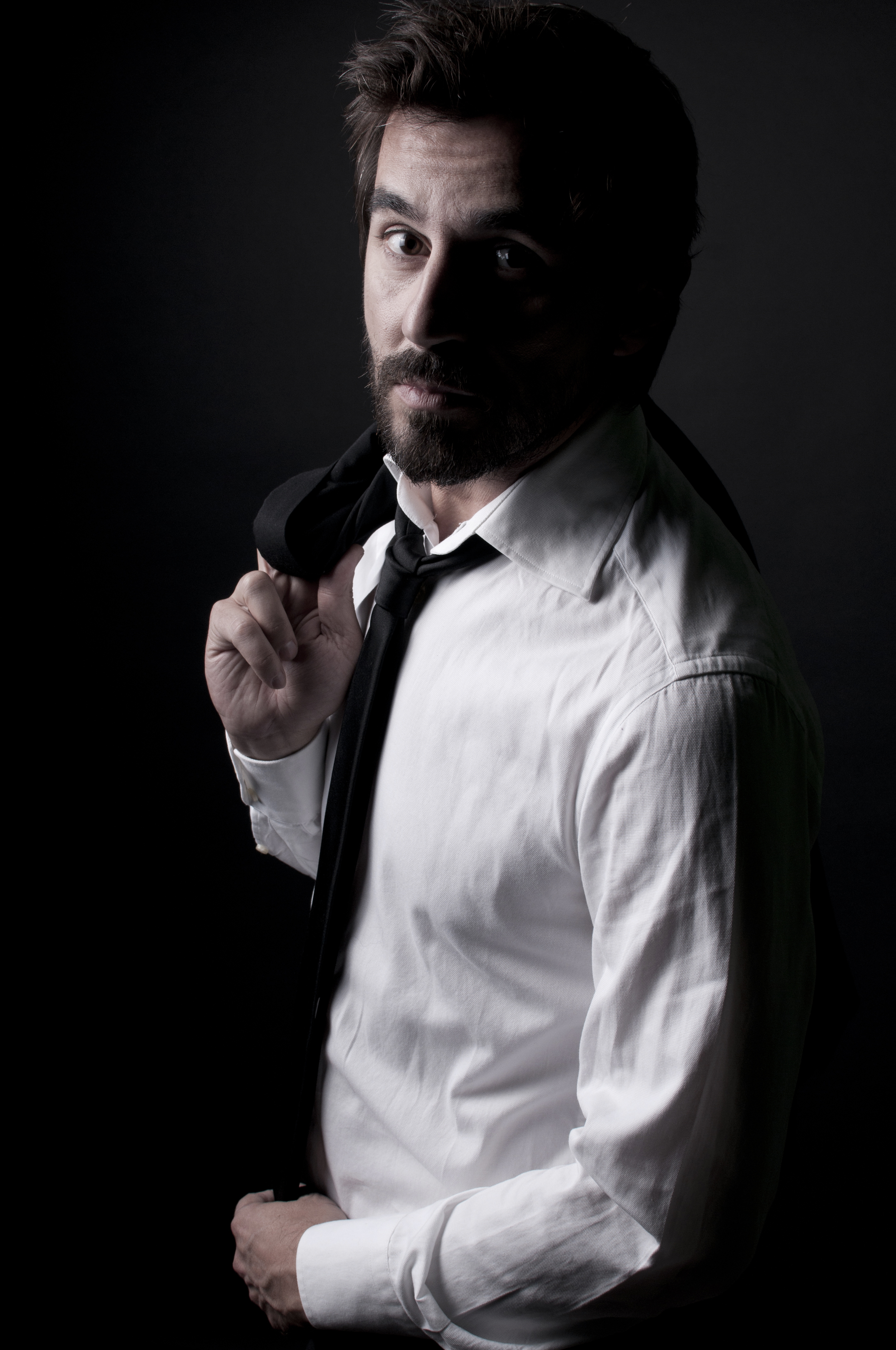
Santi Millán (1–present)

== Series overview ==
Series	Start	Finish	Winner's prize	Winner	Runner-up	Third place
1	13 February 2016	27 April 2016	€25,000	Cristina Ramos	Alberto de Paz	María Mendoza
2	21 January 2017	21 March 2017	€25,000	Antonio "El Tekila"	Samuel Martí	Progenyx
3	17 January 2018	11 April 2018	€25,000	César Brandon	Taekwondo Tao	Tomás Sanjuán
4	28 January 2019	29 April 2019	€25,000	Murga Zeta Zetas	Juan San Juan	Nazaret Natera
5	16 September 2019	16 December 2019	€25,000	Hugo Molina	Magodelucasss	Ismailah
6	15 January 2021	30 April 2021	€25,000	Celia Muñoz	Chus Serrano	Elsa Tortonda
7	10 September 2021	17 December 2021	€25,000	Dúo Turkeev	Rey Enigma	Jorge Pineda
8	5 September 2022	20 December 2022	€25,000	Jordi Caps	Dakota & Nadia	Joaquín Matas
9	9 September 2023	16 December 2023	€25,000	Lil Kids	Nikol Taranenko	Carlos Prieto "El Jilguerillo"
10	7 September 2024	21 December 2024	€25,000	Nataliya Stepanska	Chibi Unity	Sarukani
11	10 January 2026	2 May 2026	€25,000	AM Dance Studio	Ssaulabi	D'art Espectáculos

=== Seasons 1 (2016) ===
Telecinco opened auditions for Got Talent España on 15 June 2015. On 5 August 2015, Telecinco announced the panel of judges: television presenter Jesús Vázquez; television presenter Jorge Javier Vázquez; actress, comedian and television presenter Eva Hache; and singer, actress and television presenter Edurne. On 26 August 2015, actor and showman Santi Millán was announced as host. The series premiered on 13 February 2016. On 27 April 2016, versatile opera and rock music singer Cristina Ramos Pérez won the finale of the season. The pianist Alberto de Paz was runner-up and singer María Mendoza came third. There were also participations from other countries including Brazil, China, Cuba, Dominican Republic, Italy and the Philippines.

=== Season 2 (2017) ===
On 23 April 2016, Telecinco renewed the series for another season. On 27 July 2016, it was announced that publicist and media personality Risto Mejide would be a judge on the second season. It was later confirmed that Mejide would be replacing Jesús Vázquez, while Edurne, Hache and Vázquez all returned. The series premiered on 21 January 2017. On 22 March 2017, rock and roll dancer Antonio Garrido "El Tekila" won the season finale. The dancer Samuel Martí Pérez was runner-up. There were also participations from Algeria, Argentina and Cuba.

=== Season 3 (2018) ===
The third season premiered on 17 January 2018. The presenter and the four judges remained the same. On 11 April 2018, poet César Brandon from Equatorial Guinea won the season finale. This was the first time in the history of the show that a non-Spaniard won the title. The Spanish taekwondo show band Taekwondo Tao were runners-up.

=== Season 4 (2019) ===
The fourth season premiered on 28 January 2019. On 27 July 2018, it was announced that actress Eva Isanta would replace Eva Hache in the panel. On 3 September 2018, it was announced that comedian, actress and television presenter Paz Padilla would replace Jorge Javier Vázquez in the panel. Mejide and Edurne remained on the panel. On 29 April 2019, the murga group Murga Zeta Zetas won the season finale.

=== Season 5 (2019) ===
The fifth season premiered on 16 September 2019, less than five months after the finale of the fourth season. On 11 June 2019, it was announced that comedian and television presenter Dani Martínez would replace Eva Isanta in the panel, while Mejide, Padilla, and Edurne returned from the last season. On 16 December 2019, 3-year-old drummer Hugo Molina won the season finale, becoming the second youngest winner to date in any of the Got Talent franchises; the youngest winner being Arinka Shuhalevych from Ukraine in the 2016 Kid's Version.

=== Season 6 (2021) ===
The sixth season premiered on 15 January 2021. The panel remained the same, however, Padilla was only present for the semi-final and final, due to the death of her husband. On 30 April 2021, ventriloquist Celia Muñoz won the season finale.

=== Season 7 (2021) ===
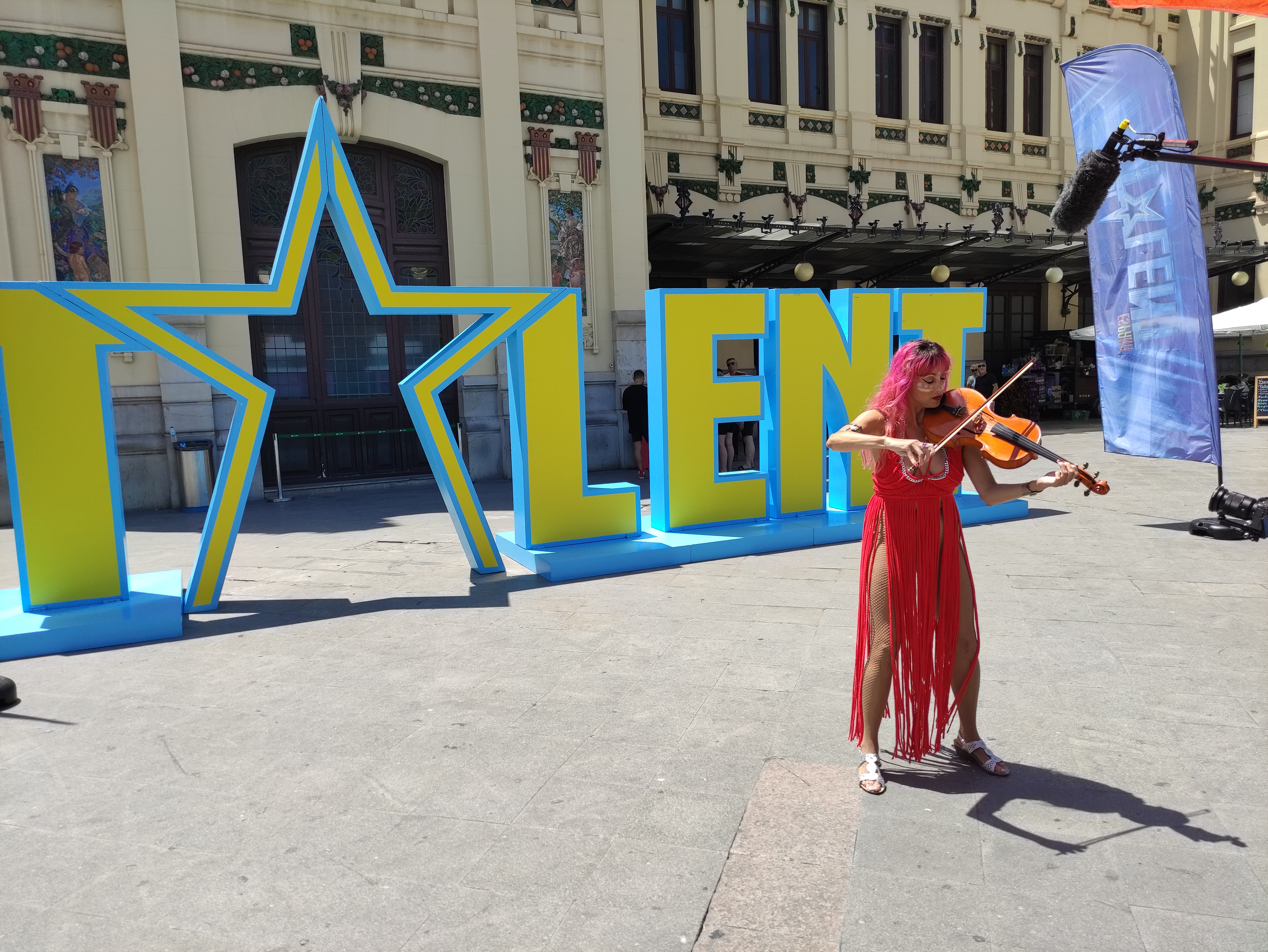
Season 9 recording in València.

The seventh season featured only three judges instead of the usual four, following the exit of Padilla. It premiered on 10 September 2021. Acrobats Dúo Turkeev won the finale on 17 December 2021.

=== Season 8 (2022) ===
The eighth season of Got Talent España premiered on 5 September 2022. Paula Echevarría joined as judge, completing a panel of four judges again. The season ended on 20 December 2022, with magician Jordi Caps winning the season.

=== Season 9 (2023) ===
The ninth season premiered on 9 September 2023. Martínez left the show and was replaced by Florentino Fernández, while Meijde, Edurne and Echevarría returned. On 16 December 2023, dance troupe Lil Kids were crowned as the winner.

=== Season 10 (2024) ===
The tenth season began on 7 September 2024. Edurne left the show and was replaced by Tamara Falcó, joining Fernández, Echevarría and Mejide. On 21 December 2024, opera singer Nataliya Stepanska was named winner.

=== Season 11 (2026) ===
The eleventh season started on 10 January 2026. Fernández and Falcó left the show. Carlos Latre and Lorena Castell were announced as their replacements, respectively. On 2 May 2026, urban dance group AM Dance Studio were announced as winner. This marked Mejide's last season as a judge.

=== Season 12 (2027) ===
The twelfth season will premiere in 2027. Mejide left the show, and was replaced with Xuso Jones, Echevarría, Castell and Latre all returned.

== Spin-offs ==
=== Got Talent: All-Stars (2023) ===
Got Talent: All-Stars is a Spanish spin-off of the Got Talent franchise produced by Fremantle España for Mediaset España and broadcast on Telecinco. The show premiered on 15 April 2023 as part of an international expansion of the Got Talent brand, and is based on America's Got Talent: All-Stars, bringing together notable contestants from different global versions of the franchise, including previous winners, finalists, and viral acts. The judging panel consists of Edurne, Paula Echevarría and Risto Mejide, with Santi Millán as presenter, while each episode features a guest judge who awards a Golden Buzzer act directly to the final. The series follows a competition structure in which selected acts from multiple countries compete for an overall title.

=== Got Talent: Fantasy League (2026) ===
In June 2026, Mediaset España announced a new spin-off titled Got Talent: Fantasy League, based on the American format America's Got Talent: Fantasy League, in which judges form competing teams of contestants and act as both mentors and competitors. The format introduces a league-style competition where acts are drafted into judge-led teams, combining elements of talent competition and fantasy sports-style selection systems. Paula Echevarría, Carlos Latre, Lorena Castell and Xuso Jones will judge the program while.
