= Got Talent España season 10 =

2024 Spanish television series

Got Talent España
- Season 10
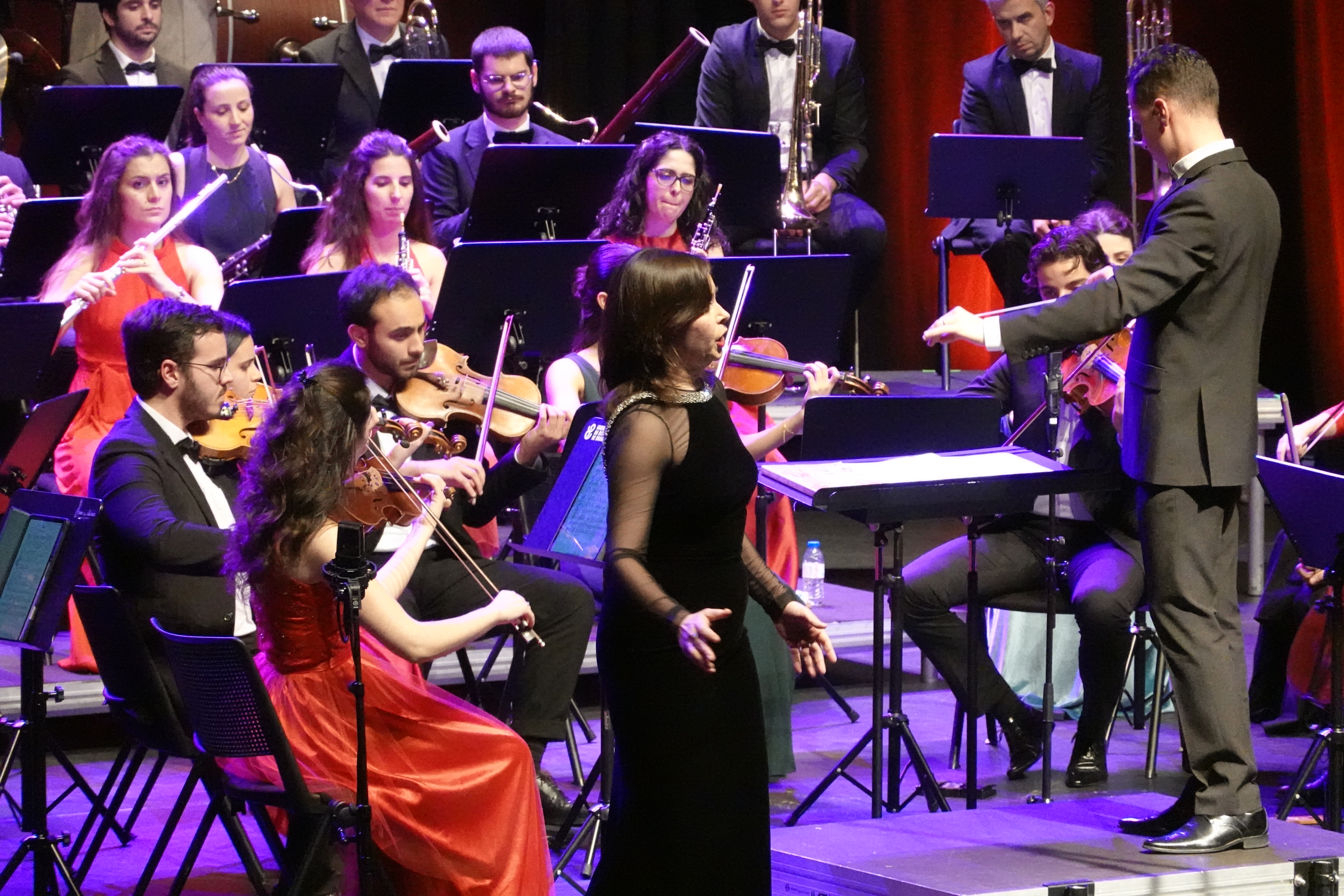
- Nataliya Stepanska
- Presented by: Santi Millán
- Judges: Risto Mejide; Tamara Falcó; Paula Echevarría; Florentino Fernández
- Winner: Nataliya Stepanska
- Runner-up: Chibi Unity

Release
- Original network: Telecinco
- Original release: 7 September – 21 December 2024

Season chronology
- Next → Season 11

The tenth season of Spanish talent competition programme Got Talent España began airing on Telecinco on 7 September 2024 and concluded on 21 December 2024. The season was presented by Santi Millán, with Risto Mejide, Tamara Falcó, Paula Echevarría and Florentino Fernández as judges.

Judges and Presenter for Got Talent España Season 10

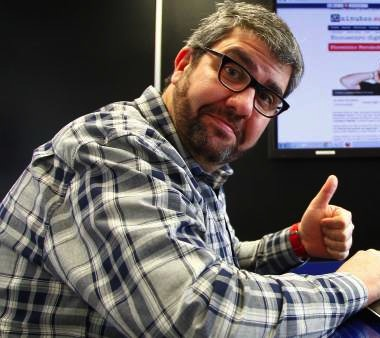
Florentino Fernández

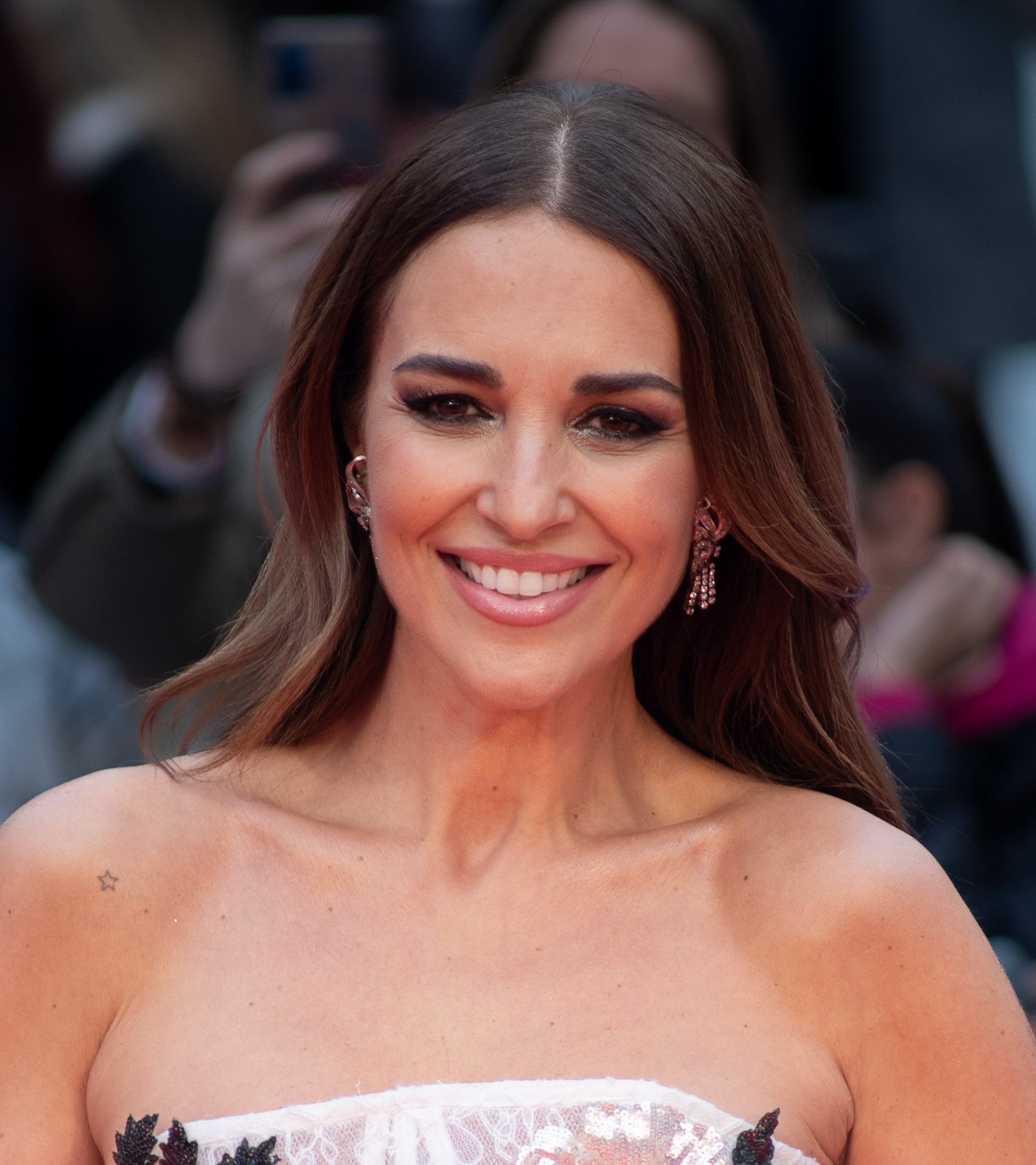
Paula Echevarría

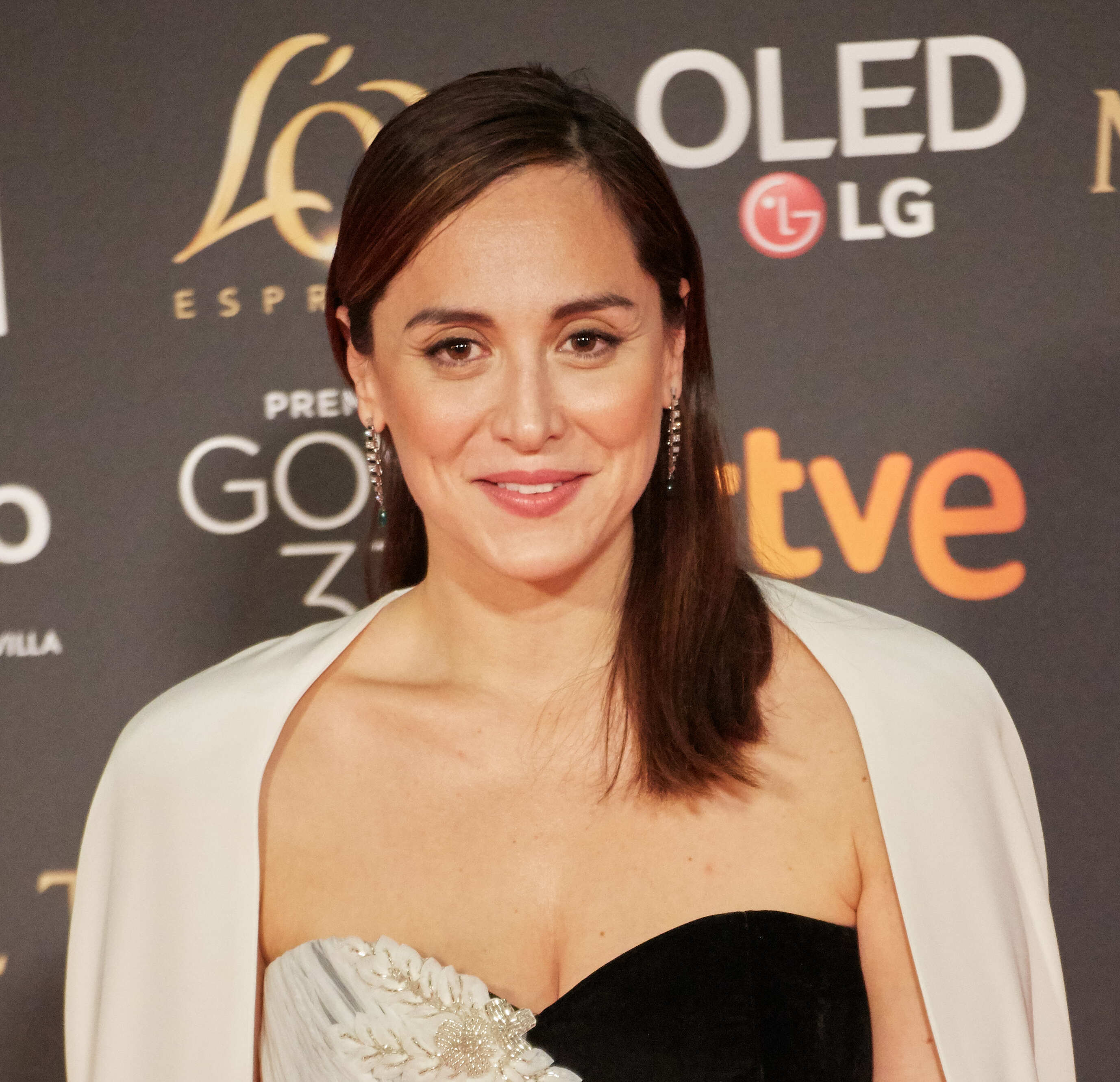
Tamara Falcó

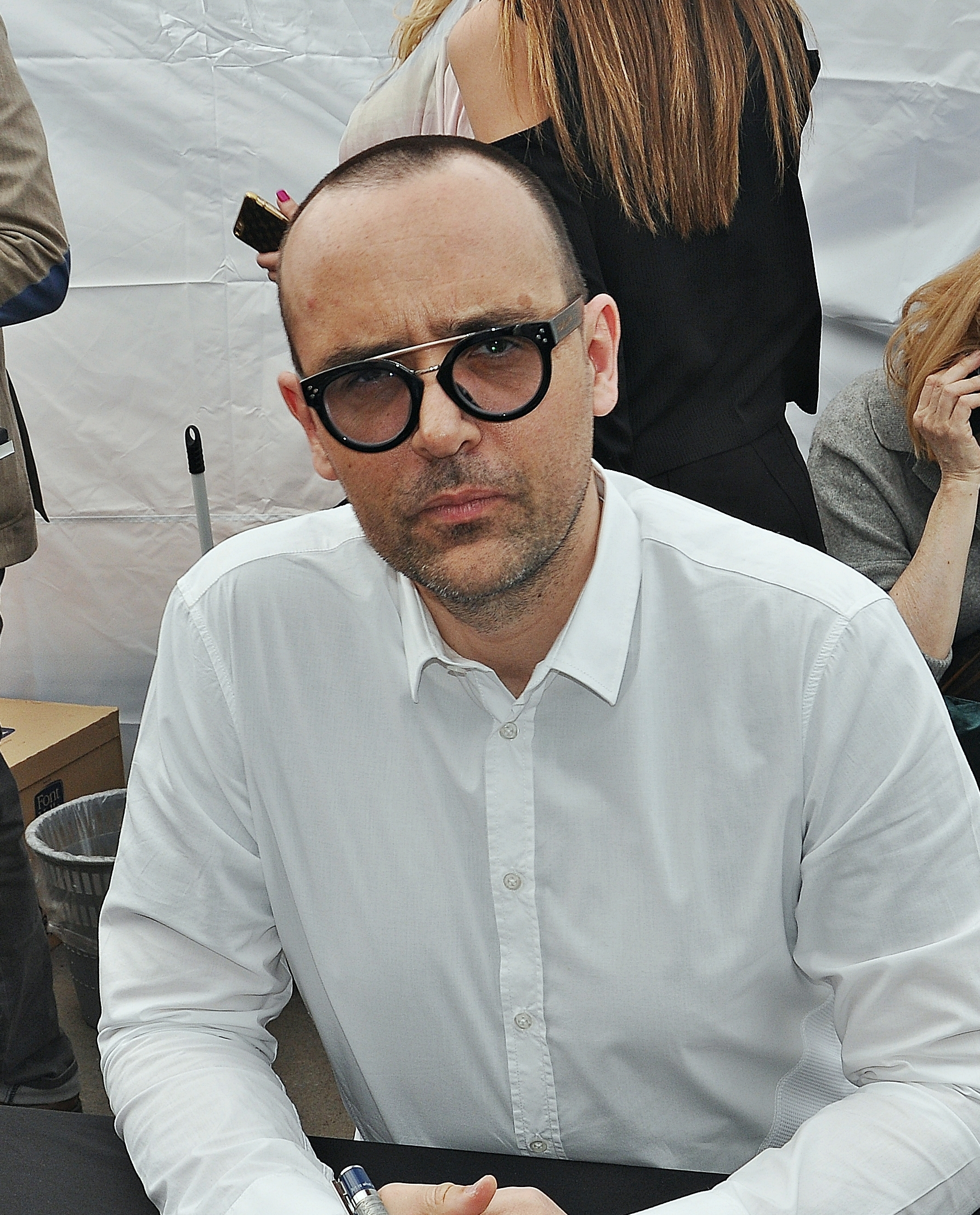
Risto Mejide

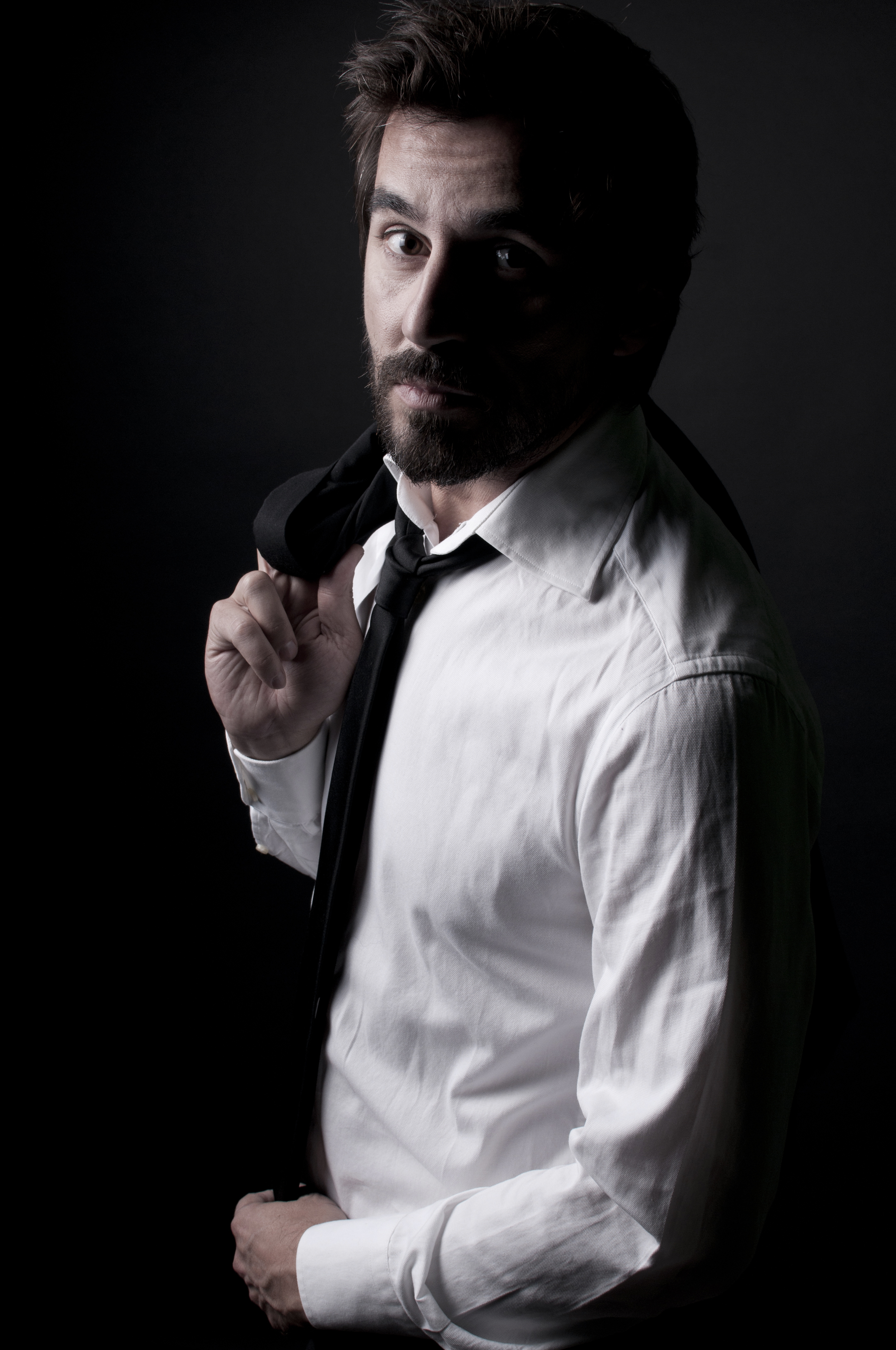
Santi Millán

== Season overview ==
Following the conclusion of the previous season, it was announced that the show would return for a tenth season. It was also confirmed that Edurne would we replaced with Tamara Falcó, who would be judging alongside Risto Mejide, Paula Echevarría and Florentino Fernández.

This season was won by opera singer Nataliya Stepanska, with dance group Chibi Unity in second and beatboxing champions Sarukani in third.

Winner
Runner-Up
Third Place
Semi-Finalist Golden Buzzer
Platinum Buzzer
Live Golden Buzzer

Participant	Age(s)	Genre	Act	Semi-final	Finished
Ambrosio Cantu	22	Singing/Music	Singer/Guitarist	3	Finalist
Andrea Chiarini	36	Music	Guitarist	3	Eliminated
Carla Richter	18	Singing	Singer	4	Eliminated
Casto Dominiguez	40	Singing/Music	Singer/Pianist	3	Eliminated
Chibi Unity	16-27	Dance	Dance Group	4	Runner-Up
Children’s Dreams	9-14	Dance	Dance Group	N/A	Finalist
Chirag Lukha	34	Danger	Danger Act	1	Eliminated
City of the Air Choir	10-18	Singing	Choir	4	Eliminated
Daliana & José	20	Acrobatics	Balancing Duo	4	Eliminated
Daniele & Naimana	42 & 43	Singing/Comedy	Ventriloquist Duo	3	Eliminated
Daria Ponomarenko	11	Acrobatics	Pole Dancer	1	Finalist
David Burlet	53	Variety	Plate Spinner	4	Eliminated
David “Record Breaker” Rush	39	Variety	Record Breaker	2	Eliminated
Duo Just Two Men	—N/a	Acrobatics	Aerial Duo	2	Eliminated
Duo Parshyns	25 & 44	Acrobatics	Aerial Duo	2	Eliminated
Echo Man	39	Variety	Vocalist	4	Eliminated
Ekaterina Shelehova	28	Singing	Singer	4	Eliminated
El Diamante Negro	35	Acrobatics	Acrobat	3	Finalist
Guilleproff	29	Singing	Choir	2	Eliminated
Guille & Roy Moreno	13 & 41	Singing/Music	Singing/Music Duo	1	Eliminated
Hermanas Segura	19 & 20	Acrobatics	Balancing Duo	2	Eliminated
I Am Naughty	18-30	Dance	Dance Group	3	Finalist
Joan Natzari	30	Comedy	Comedian	2	Eliminated
Karim	44	Comedy/Magic	Comedy Magician	4	Finalist
Kimberly Winter	34	Variety	Burper	N/A	Withdrew
Krystal & Melissa	3 & 23	Animals	Dog Act	2	Eliminated
Lady	5 months	Animals	Pig Act	1	Eliminated
M++	23-32	Dance	LED Dance Group	1	Eliminated
Magiciano	—N/a	Magic	Magician	3	Eliminated
Magic Jano	37	Magic	Magician	3	Eliminated
Magic José	—N/a	Magic	Magician	1	Eliminated
Marcos Waldemar	—N/a	Magic	Magician	1	Eliminated
Miss Vicky	21	Acrobatics	Pole Dancer	3	Eliminated
MK	25	Magic	Magician	2	Finalist
Mohamed Brothers	—N/a	Acrobatics	Balancing Duo	3	Eliminated
Musicals Junior	15-23	Singing	Choir	1	Finalist
Nataliya Stepanska	36	Singing	Opera Singer	2	Winner
Orthemis Orchestra	27-63	Comedy/Music	Comedy Orchestra	4	Eliminated
Paul Henry	31	Magic	Magician	4	Finalist
Philipe Mateos	28	Comedy	Comedian	3	Eliminated
Pipe & Kathe	18 & 25	Dance	Salsa Duo	1	Eliminated
Roman Garcia	47	Magic	Magician	2	Eliminated
Sarukani	22-24	Singing	Beatboxing Group	2	Third place
Tataki	—N/a	Dance	Dance Group	1	Eliminated
TK	34	Variety	Sand Artist	1	Finalist
Trinh Tra My	30	Danger	Danger Act	3	Eliminated
Vilas Nayak	40	Variety	Speed Artist	4	Eliminated
Wannabes	33-49	Variety	Novelty Act	1	Eliminated
Xtreme Flying	35 & 37	Acrobatics	Aerial Duo	4	Eliminated
YuiYui	29	Dance	Dancer	2	Eliminated

=== Semi-finals summary ===
Buzzed out
Golden Buzzer
Won the Golden Buzzer
Won the Public Vote Eliminated

Prior to the beginning of the live shows, the semi-finalists were decided following a deliberation stage.

==== Semi-final 1 ====
Semi-Finalist	Order	Buzzes				Finished
Semi-Finalist	Order	Mejide	Falcó	Echevarría	Fernandez	Finished
M++	1					Eliminated
Lady	2					Eliminated
Guille & Roy Moreno	3					Eliminated
Daria Ponomarenko	4					Advanced
TK	5					Advanced
Chirag Lukha	6					Eliminated
Magic José	7					Eliminated
Tataki	8					Eliminated
Wannabes	9					Eliminated
Musicals Junior	10			Live Golden Buzzer		Golden Buzzer Advancement
Pipe & Kathe	11					Eliminated
Marcos Waldemar	12					Eliminated

==== Semi-final 2 ====
Semi-Finalist	Order	Buzzes				Finished
Semi-Finalist	Order	Mejide	Falcó	Echevarría	Fernandez	Finished
David “Record Breaker” Rush	1		^{1}		^{2}	Eliminated
Hermanas Segura	2					Eliminated
MK	3	Live Golden Buzzer				Golden Buzzer Advancement
YuiYui	4				^{3}	Eliminated
Nataliya Stepanska	5					Advanced
Joan Natzari	6					Eliminated
Duo Just Two Men	7					Eliminated
Guilleproff	8					Eliminated
Roman Garcia	9					Eliminated
Krystal & Melissa	10					Eliminated
Sarukani	11					Advanced
Duo Parshyns	12					Eliminated

- ^1 Mejide pressed Falco's buzzer on her behalf.
- ^2 Fernandez accidentally pressed his buzzer, trying to stop Mejide and Echevarría from pressing it on his behalf.
- ^3 Fernandez buzzed after the act, when Echevarría was questioning Mejide's decision to buzz.

==== Semi-final 3 ====
Semi-Finalist	Order	Buzzes				Finished
Semi-Finalist	Order	Mejide	Falcó	Echevarría	Fernandez	Finished
Mohamed Brothers	1					Eliminated
Andrea Chiarini	2					Eliminated
Magiciano	3					Eliminated
Eldiamante Negro	4		Live Golden Buzzer			Golden Buzzer Advancement
Casto Dominiguez	5					Eliminated
Philipe Mateos	6					Eliminated
Trinh Tra My	7					Eliminated
Ambrosio Cantu	8					Advanced
I Am Naughty	9					Advanced
Magic Jano	10					Eliminated
Daniele & Naimana	11					Eliminated
Miss Vicky	12					Eliminated

==== Semi-final 4 ====
Semi-Finalist	Order	Buzzes				Finished
Semi-Finalist	Order	Mejide	Falcó	Echevarría	Fernandez	Finished
Chibi Unity	1					Advanced
David Burlet	2					Eliminated
City of the Air Choir	3					Eliminated
Paul Henry	4				Live Golden Buzzer	Golden Buzzer Advancement
Echo Man	5					Eliminated
Carla Richter	6					Eliminated
Daliana & José	7					Eliminated
Orthemis Orchestra	8					Eliminated
Vilas Nayak	9					Eliminated
Karim	10					Advanced
Xtreme Flying	11					Eliminated
Ekaterina Shelehova	12					Eliminated

=== Finals Summary ===
Semi-Finalist	Order	Buzzes				Finished
Semi-Finalist	Order	Mejide	Falcó	Echevarría	Fernandez	Finished
Eldiamante Negro	1					Eliminated
Musicals Junior	2					Eliminated
MK	3					Eliminated
TK	4					Eliminated
Chibi Unity	5					Runner-Up
Ambrosio Cantu	6					Eliminated
Paul Henry	7					Eliminated
Children’s Dreams	8					Eliminated
Sarukani	9					Third Place
Karim	10					Eliminated
Daria Ponomarenko	11					Eliminated
Nataliya Stepanska	12					Winner
