= Cristina Ramos (singer) =

Spanish rock and opera singer

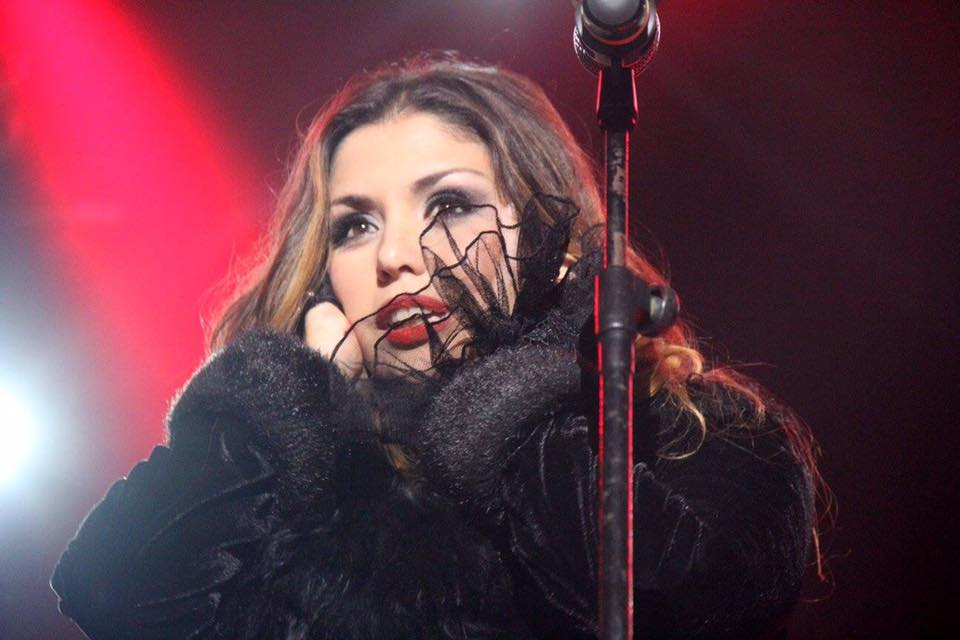
- Born: Cristina Ramos Pérez; February 19, 1979 (age 47); Las Palmas de Gran Canaria, Canary Islands, Spain
- Occupation: Singer
- Years active: 2006–present
- Website: http://www.cristinaramos.es/

Cristina Ramos Pérez (born in Las Palmas de Gran Canaria, Canaries on 19 February 1979) is a Spanish rock and opera singer.

== Career ==
She is known for winning talent shows in television like the seventh season of La Voz (Mexico) and the first edition of Got Talent Spain. She is one of the 5 artists of the top 5 of America's Got Talent the Champions that issued in the NBC and that gathered to the best artists of the 15 years of history of the program in his more than 50 versions in the world. She was also David Foster's golden button in the World's Got Talent of China and among 2020 and 2021 took part in the eighth season of Tu cara me suena, in which she remained third finalist.
