= Laura Escanes =

Spanish Cantante

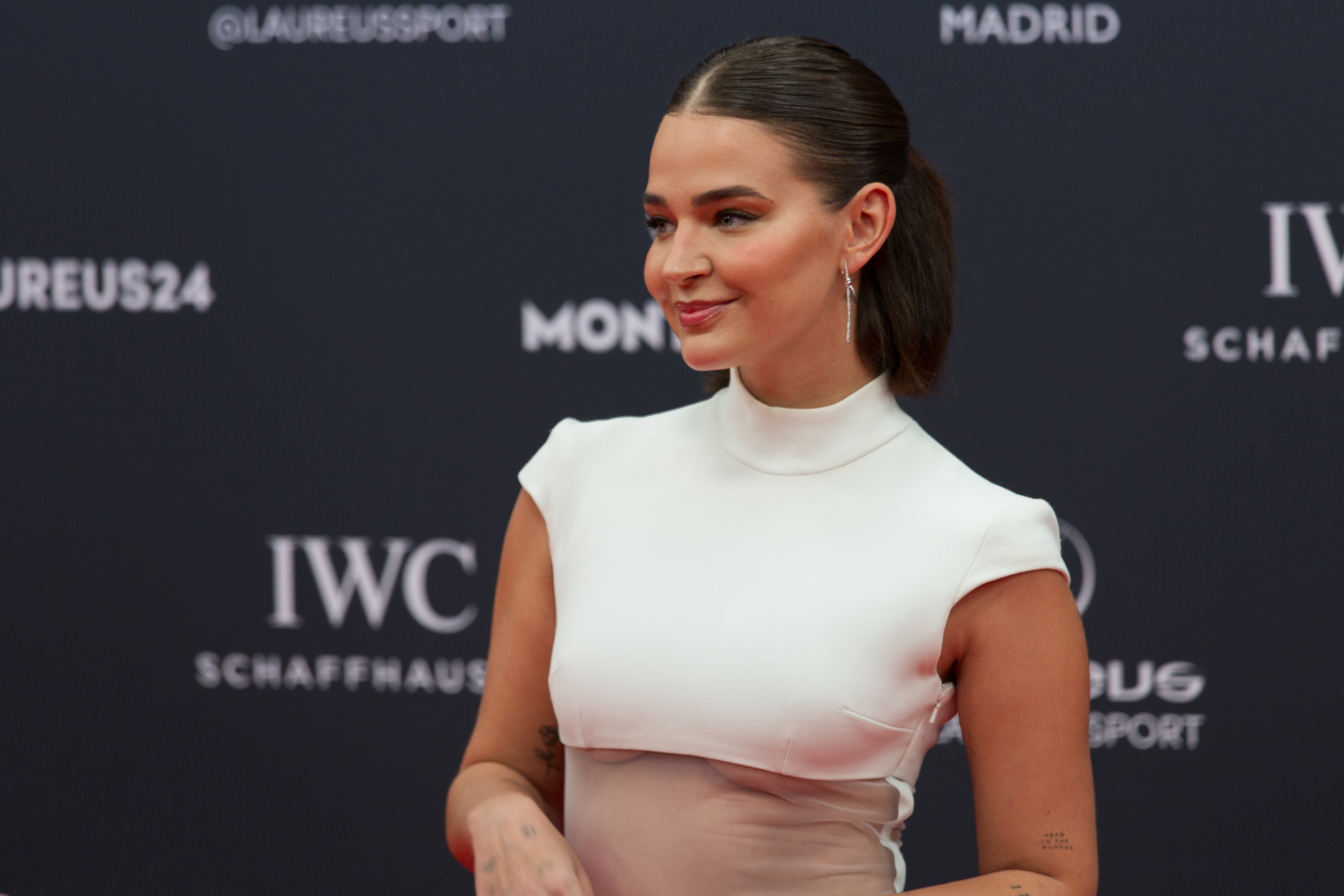
- Born: 13 April 1996 (age 30); Barcelona, Spain
- Education: Open University of Catalonia
- Occupations: Model and influencer
- Spouse: Risto Mejide (m. 2017-d. 2022)
- Partner(s): Alvaro de Luna (2022–2023); Joan Verdú (2025–present)
- Children: 1

Laura Escanes Espinosa (born 13 April 1996) is a Spanish model and influencer known for her relationship with Risto Mejide, whom was 22 years older than her.

== Biography ==
Laura Escanes was born in Barcelona on 13 April 1996. She has a younger brother named Albert.

In 2015 she began her bachelor's degree in journalism at the University Ramon Llull, but had to abandon it because she could not combine face-to-face university studies with her work. In 2018 she began a bachelor's degree in communication at the Open University of Catalonia (UOC) which included journalism, advertising, public relations and audiovisual communication.

She created her Instagram profile in 2012 on the recommendation of her father to share photos of her travels. Since then, she has become more well known on social media. As of December 2019, she had more than 1 million followers.

In 2015, she collaborated with the Majorcan jewelry brand Majorica for the advertising campaign Why Not? In 2016, she paraded at Barcelona Fashion Week with the brand Custo Barcelona, and that same year she made her debut at New York Fashion Week, also parading for the same brand.

In November 2019, she attended as a guest at the People in Red Gala of the Fight AIDS Foundation.

In 2022, Laura wins the Lifestyle award at the first Idol Awards gala.

Also in 2022, it was announced she would be signed as a contestant on the Antena 3 program El desafío, being the second influencer to compete after her friend María Pombo.

== Personal life ==
She had a two-year relationship with professional poker player Ferran Reñaga. Shortly after their breakup, in 2015, she began a relationship with television personality Risto Mejide, 21 years her senior. They were married on 20 May 2017 at Mas Cabanyes. On 2 October 2019, they had their only child together, Roma. The couple announced their breakup on 25 September 2022.

In October 2022, the website Havannews published that the influencer was maintaining a relationship with Alberto Redondo Jiménez, better known as Mister Jägger. In November 2022 she was photographed kissing the musician Álvaro de Luna.

Since 2025, she has been in a relationship with Andorran alpine skier Joan Verdú.

== Works ==
In 2018, she released her first book of poems, Piel de Letra.

== Fashion shows ==
- 2016: Fashion week Barcelona with the brand Custo Dalmau
- 2016: New York Fashion Week with the brand Custo Dalmau
