= Paz Padilla =

Spanish comedian, actress and presenter (born 1969)

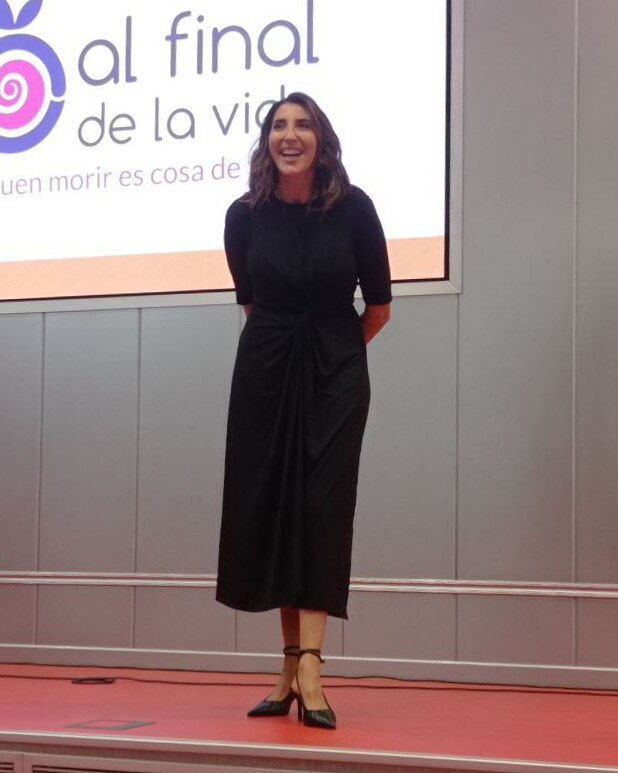
- Born: María de la Paz Padilla Díaz; 25 September 1969 (age 55); Cádiz, Spain
- Occupation(s): Comedian, actress and presenter
- Years active: 1994–present
- Spouses: Albert Ferrer (m. 1998; div. 2003) Antonio Juan Vidal Agarrado (m. 2016; died 2020)
- Children: Anna Ferrer Padilla

María de la Paz Padilla Díaz (born 30 July 1969 in Cádiz) is a Spanish comedian, actress and presenter.

After working as a clinical assistant in a Cádiz hospital, she became known in the comedy contest Saque bola (1989) on the regional Andalusian television channel Canal Sur. She later appeared in 1994 on the television comedy show Genio y Figura on Antena 3.

She then made several appearances on several shows in this channel. In 1996, she co-hosted the television charity special Inocente, Inocente.

Between 1997 and 1999, she worked for the late night show Crónicas marcianas on Telecinco. After that, she has worked for several television shows as a presenter.

Since November 2009, she hosts the talk show Sálvame (a program with a large following in Telecinco) on Thursdays and Fridays and holiday periods.

Since 2019, Padilla has been on the talent show Got Talent España as a judge.

Besides her career as a presenter and comedian, she has also worked as an actress: in theatre, notably with theatre company El Terrat; in cinema in films like Raluy (1999), Marujas asesinas (2001) or Cobardes (2008); and in television sitcoms such as ¡Ala... Dina! (2000-2001) in TVE, Mis adorables vecinos (2004-2006) in Antena 3, and La que se avecina (2013–present) in Telecinco. She has also worked in radio broadcastings in COPE.

== Television ==
=== As a presenter ===
- Genio y Figura 1994-1995, in Antena 3
- Inocente, inocente 1996, in Antena 3
- Vídeos, Vídeos 1996, in Antena 3
- Sonrisas de España 1997, in Antena 3
- Hola, hola, hola 1997, in Antena 3
- La Noche de los Inocentes 1997-1998, in Antena 3
- Bajo cero con Paz Padilla 1998-1999, in Telecinco
- In Fraganti 1999-2001, in TVE
- Gala Míster España 2001, in TVE
- Gala TP de Oro 2000 2001, en TVE
- Final del COAC en el Gran Teatro Falla 2005-2009, in Canal Sur TV
- Shalakabula 2006-2008, in Canal Sur TV
- Gala Especiales-Nochebuena 2006-2007, in Canal Sur TV
- Especial, Carnavales de Cádiz 2007-2009, in Canal Sur TV
- Hasta que la tele nos separe 2006, in TVE
- El Gong Show 2007, in TVE
- Paz en la tierra 2008-2009, in Canal Sur TV
- Especial Navidad y Fin de Año 2009-2011, in Telecinco
- Dejadnos solos 2009-2010, in Telecinco
- Al Ataque Chow 2010, in Telecinco
- La noche en Paz: Especial de Nochebuena 2009–present, in Telecinco
- Sálvame 2009–present in Telecinco
- Al Ataque Chow 2010 in Telecinco
- El año en Paz 2011–2016 in Telecinco

=== Collaborations ===
- Saque bola (1989, comedian)
- Genio y figura (1994-1995, comedian)
- Un millón de gracias (1995, comedian)
- Lluvia de estrellas (1996, judge)
- Muchas Gracias 96 (1996, comedian)
- Crónicas marcianas (1997-1999, comedian)
- Telepasión (1999, comedian)
- Gala Unicef «¿Cómo están ustedes?» (2000, comedian)
- El Grand Prix del verano (2003 and 2008, celebrity guest)
- Más que baile (2006-2007, celebrity guest)
- Channel Nº4 (2007-2008, panellist)
- Al pie de la letra (2008, celebrity guest)
- Espejo público (2008-2009, panellist)
- Cantame una canción (2010, judge)
- La Noria (2010, celebrity guest)
- Pasapalabra (2010, 2011, 2012, 2013, 2014; celebrity guest)
- ¡Arriba ese ánimo! (2012, comedian)
- Cabaret Olé (2012, comedian)
- Sopa de gansos (2015, comedian)
- Got Talent España (2019–present, judge)

=== As an actress ===
==== Main roles ====
- ¡Ala... Dina! (2000-2001)
- Mis adorables vecinos (2004-2006)
- Ponme una nube, Rocío (2008)
- La que se avecina (2010–present)

==== Recurring roles ====
- Un paso adelante (2004)
- Casi perfectos (2004)
- Homo Zapping (2004)
- Cambio de clase (2006)
- Manolo & Benito Corporeision (2007)
- Pelotas (2009)
- Las chicas de oro (2010)
- Palomitas (2011)
- La sagrada família (2011)
- Cuñados (2012)
- Aida (2014)
- Chiringuito de Pepe (2016)

== Cinema ==
- Raluy, una noche en el circo (2000)
- Marujas asesinas (2001)
- Cobardes (2008)

== Theatre ==
- Ustedes se preguntarán como he llegado hasta aquí (2007–2008)
- Solo Paz Padilla (2012–2014)
- Sofocos (2012)
- Desatadas (2018)
- El Humor de mi Vida (2021-2022) con Juan Fernandez de Valderama

== Published books ==
- «Quien te ha visto y quien te ve, Mari». Ed. Espasa Libros. Año 2013. ISBN 9788467028508
