= Got Talent España season 1 =

Got Talent España season 1 was won by Cristina Ramos.

== Semi-finalist summary ==
Fourteen acts perform each week, five of whom will make it through to the final. Each judge can buzz an act in the semi-finals. If an act receives four buzzers, it will be ended, but the public can still vote at home.

Key	G Golden act	Winner	Runner-up	Finalist

Name of act	Act	Semi-final (week)	Position reached
Cristina Ramos	Opera and rock music singer	3	Winner
Alberto De Paz	Pianist	2	Runner-up
Maria Mendoza	Singer	4	Finalist
Bichiswaag	Dance group	1	Finalist
Donet Collazo	Pole dancer	1	Finalist
Dianne Jacobs	Singer	1	Finalist
Javi Lin	Violinist	1	Finalist
Fonty	Dancer	1	Finalist
Ballet Kebanna	Dance group	2	Finalist
David Pereira	Acrobat	2	Finalist
David Tejada	Dancer	2	Finalist
Adrianna	Opera singer	2	Finalist
Sergio Ordonexz	Balancer	3	Finalist
Gabriela	Singer	3	Finalist
Celia and Marco	Acrobats	3	Finalist
Zistarlit	Dance group	3	Finalist
Robin Dee	Singer	4	Finalist
Arianna Moia	Singer	4	Finalist
Safah	Singer	1	Semi-finalist
Roberto Herruzo	Drummer	1	Semi-finalist
Draun	Close-up magician	1	Semi-finalist
Yousef	Football skills	1	Semi-finalist
Ana Norro	Ventriloquist	1	Semi-finalist
Nassim Y nayara	Wheelchair dancer	1	Semi-finalist
Antolin Benitez	Singer	1	Semi-finalist
Lightshock	Electronic dance group	1	Semi-finalist
Las Xl	Singer and guitarist	1	Semi-finalist
Jonas Molbeck	Guitarist	2	Semi-finalist
Pedro Martnez	Singer	2	Semi-finalist
Ivan Ojeda	Magician	2	Semi-finalist
Forever Young	Dance group	2	Semi-finalist
Hamza	Singer	2	Semi-finalist
Adriano	Saw player	2	Semi-finalist
Berta	Cube solver	2	Semi-finalist
Blackhane on the Street	Rappers, singers and dancers	2	Semi-finalist
Ana Navarro	Singer	2	Semi-finalist
Joe Mecanic	Comedian	2	Semi-finalist
Luis and Alba	Dancers	3	Semi-finalist
Fernando	Comedian	3	Semi-finalist
Manuel Santiago	Singer	3	Semi-finalist
Pedro	Singer	3	Semi-finalist
Angel	Dancer	3	Semi-finalist
Abmiram Quartet	Xylophone players	3	Semi-finalist
Manuel Alcalde	Close-up magician	3	Semi-finalist
Mallorca's Gay Men's Chorus	Choir	3	Semi-finalist
Keuman	Singer	3	Semi-finalist
Elihu	Dancer	4	Semi-finalist
Oihane	Singer and pianist	4	Semi-finalist
FreakTwins	Dancers	4	Semi-finalist
Soto	Nut cracker	4	Semi-finalist
Show Brasil	Acrobats	4	Semi-finalist
Ivan Asemjo	Magician	4	Semi-finalist
Blackstone Berni Y Samu	Band	4	Semi-finalist
Marco Aurelio	Arial performer	4	Semi-finalist
Alvaro Montes	Singer	4	Semi-finalist
Rafa Piccola	Shadow play	4	Semi-finalist
The Bar Bio	Acrobats	4	Semi-finalist
X-Adows	Dance group	4	Semi-finalist
Black Diamond	Band	4	Semi-finalist

== Semi-final rounds ==
Key	Buzzed out	Finished in first place; automatically advanced to the finals.

=== Semi-final 1 ===
Order	Artist	Act	Buzzes				Finished
Order	Artist	Act	Jesus	Edurne	Eva	Jorge J	Finished
1	Safah	Singer					Eliminated
2	Bichiswaag	Dance group					Advanced
3	Donet Collazo	Pole dancer					Advanced
4	Roberto Herruzo	Drummer					Eliminated
5	Draun	Close-up magician					Eliminated
6	Dianne Jacobs	Singer					Advanced
7	Yousef	Football skills					Eliminated
8	Ana Norro	Ventriloquist					Eliminated
9	Nassim Y nayara	Wheelchair dancer					Eliminated
10	Antolin Benitez	Singer					Eliminated
11	Lightshock	Electronic dance group					Eliminated
12	Javi Lin	Violinist					Advanced
13	Las Xl	Singer and guitarist					Eliminated
14	Fonty	Dancer					Advanced

=== Semi-final 2 ===
Order	Artist	Act	Buzzes				Finished
Order	Artist	Act	Jesus	Edurne	Eva	Jorge J	Finished
1	Ballet Kebanna	Dance group					Advanced
2	Ivan Ojeda	Magician					Eliminated
3	Forever Young	Dance group					Eliminated
4	David Pereira	Acrobat					Advanced
5	Hamza	Singer					Eliminated
6	Adriano	Saw player					Eliminated
7	Berta	Cube solver					Eliminated
8	Alberto De Paz	Pianist					Advanced
9	Blackhane on the Street	Rappers, singers and dancers					Eliminated
10	Jonas Molbeck	Singer and harmonica player					Eliminated
11	Ana Navarro	Singer					Eliminated
12	David Tejada	Dancer					Advanced
13	Joe Mecanic	Comedian					Eliminated
14	Adrianna	Opera singer					Advanced

^1 Alberto De Paz accidentally had a x by Jorge J; even though he didn't even press the button, it showed up before the act even started.

=== Semi-final 3 ===
Order	Artist	Act	Buzzes				Finished
Order	Artist	Act	Jesus	Edurne	Eva	Jorge J	Finished
1	Luis and Alba	Dancers					Eliminated
2	Fernando	Comedian					Eliminated
3	Manuel Santiago	Singer					Eliminated
4	Sergio Ordonexz	Balancer					Advanced
5	Pedro	Singer					Eliminated
6	Angel	Glow in the dark dancer					Eliminated
7	Abmiram Quartet	Xylophone players					Eliminated
8	Gabriela	Singer					Advanced
9	Celia and Marco	Acrobats					Advanced
10	Manuel Alcalde	Close-up magician					Eliminated
11	Christina Ramos	Singer					Advanced
12	Mallorca's Gay Men's Chorus	Choir					Eliminated
13	Zistarlity	Dance group					Advanced
14	Keuman	Singer					Eliminated

=== Semi-final 4 ===
Order	Artist	Act	Buzzes				Finished
Order	Artist	Act	Jesus	Edurne	Eva	Jorge J	Finished
1	Elihu	Dancer					Eliminated
2	Oihane	Singer and pianist (sang "Read All About It")					Eliminated
3	FreakTwins	Dancers					Eliminated
4	Soto	Nut cracker					Eliminated
5	Maria Mendoza	Singer					Advanced
6	Show Brasil	Acrobats					Eliminated
7	Ivan Asemjo	Magician					Eliminated
8	Blackstone Berni Y Samu	Band					Eliminated
9	Marco Aurelio	Ariel					Eliminated
10	Alvaro Montes	Singer					Eliminated
11	Rafa Piccola	Shadow play					Eliminated
12	The Bar Bio	Acrobats					Eliminated
13	Robin Dee	Singer					Advanced
14	X-Adows	Dance group					Eliminated
15	Black Diamond	Band					Eliminated
16	Arianna Moia	Singer					Advanced

== Final ==
The final was broadcast on 28 April 2016.

Order	Artist	Act	Finished
1	Diane Jacons	Singer	First group eliminated
2	David Tejada	Dancer	First group eliminated
3	Zistarlity	Dance group	First group eliminated
4	Alberto	Pianist	Runner-up
5	Donet Collazo	Pole dancer	First group eliminated
6	Robin Dee	Singer	First group eliminated
7	Bichiswaag	Dance group	Second group eliminated
8	Arianna	Singer (sang "Over the Rainbow")	Second group eliminated
9	Celia And Marco	Acrobats	Second group eliminated
10	Maria Mendoza	Singer	Finalist
11	Sergio Ordonez	Acrobat	Second group eliminated
12	Javi Lin	Violinist	Second group eliminated
13	Fonty	Dancer	3rd group eliminated
14	Gabriela	Singer	3rd group eliminated
15	Marco	Dancer	3rd group eliminated
16	Cristina Ramos	Singer	Winner
17	David Pereira	Balancer	3rd group eliminated
18	Ballet Kebanna	Dance group	3rd group eliminated
