= Dani Martínez =

Spanish footballer (born 2006)

Personal information
- Full name: Daniel Martínez Moreno
- Date of birth: 5 May 2004 (age 22)
- Place of birth: Zaragoza, Spain
- Height: 1.83 m (6 ft 0 in)
- Position: Centre-back

Team information
- Current team: Atlético Madrid
- Number: 30

Youth career
- Zaragoza
- 2020–2023: Atlético Madrid

Senior career*
Years	Team	Apps	(Gls)
2023–2026	Atlético Madrid B	74	(0)
2026–	Atlético Madrid	2	(0)
- * Club domestic league appearances and goals as of 19 August 2026

Daniel "Dani" Martínez Moreno (born 5 May 2004) is a Spanish professional footballer who plays as a centre-back for Atlético Madrid.

== Career ==
Born in Zaragoza, Aragon, Martínez joined Atlético Madrid's youth categories in May 2020, from hometown side Real Zaragoza. He was promoted to the reserves ahead of the 2023–24 season in Primera Federación, and made his senior debut on 26 August 2023, coming on as a late substitute in a 2–0 home win over Antequera CF.

On 12 July 2024, Martínez renewed his contract with Atleti until 2027. He subsequently established himself as a regular starter for the B-team, and made his professional – and La Liga – debut with the main squad on 11 April 2026, starting in a 2–1 away loss to Sevilla.

On 1 September 2026, Martínez was definitely promoted to the first team.
