= Risto Mejide =

Spanish publicist, music producer and judge

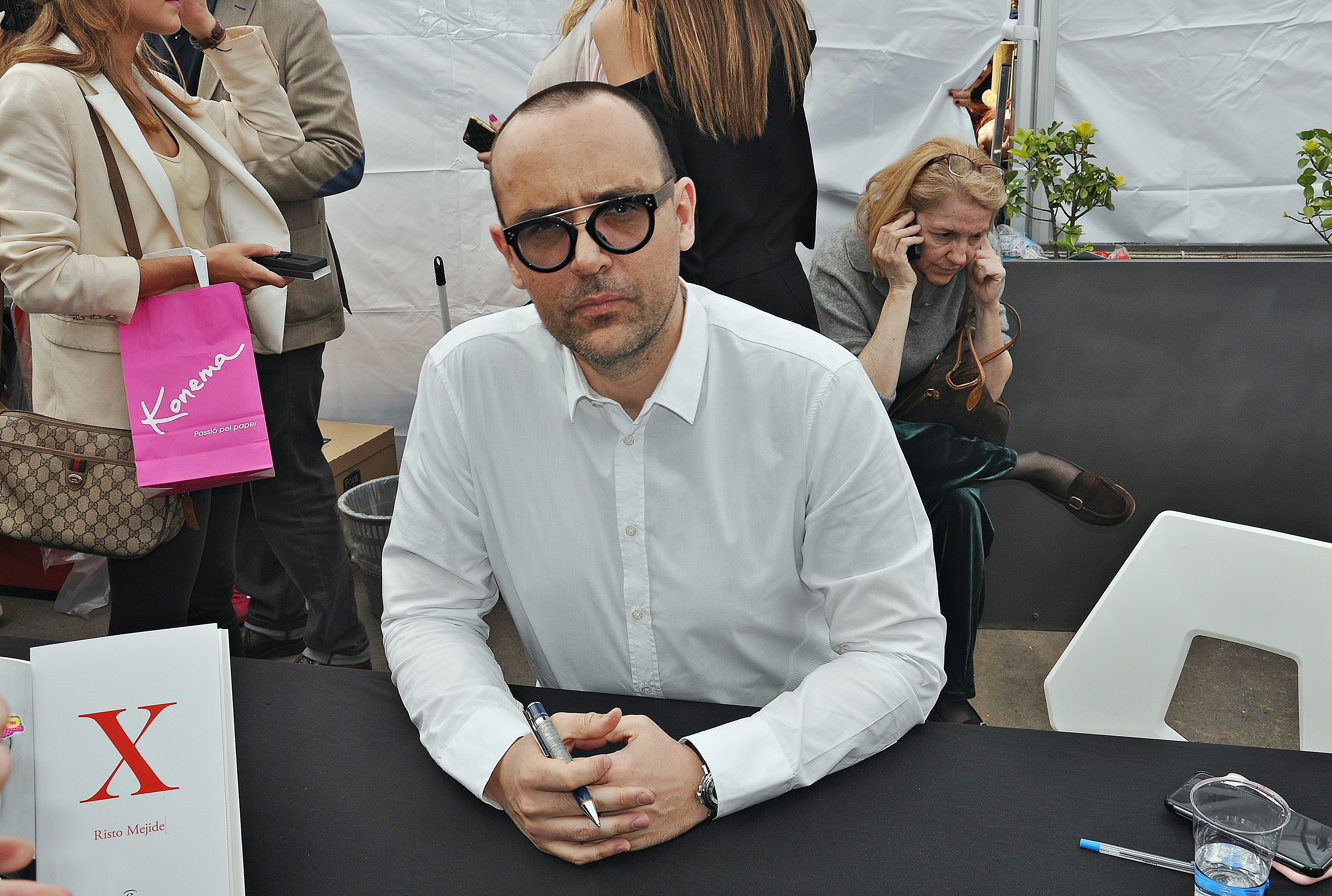
- Risto Mejide in 2016
- Born: Ricardo Mejide Roldán; 29 November 1974 (age 51); Barcelona, Spain
- Education: ESADE
- Occupations: Publicist, author, music producer, songwriter, talent show judge, and TV presenter
- Spouse: Laura Escanes (m. 2017; sep. 2022)

Risto Mejide Roldán (born 29 November 1974; born Ricardo Mejide Roldán), is a Spanish publicist, author, music producer, talent show judge, TV presenter and songwriter, best known as a judge on the television talent shows Operación Triunfo, Tú sí que vales, Got Talent España, Factor X and Top Star. ¿Cuánto vale tu voz?, all five of them aired on Telecinco.

== Biography ==
Risto was born as Ricardo Mejide Roldán, and not as some sources claimed that his real name was Evaristo. He has made it clear in several interviews that his name is Risto, and at the age of 18 decided officially change it and use the Finnish version of his name.

Risto Mejide holds a Bachelor's degree and MBA from the ESADE Business School (1997), where he also worked as a lecturer.

=== Personal life ===
On 20 May 2017, Mejide married model and social media personality Laura Escanes, twenty years his junior. Both were the guest stars of an episode of the television series Planeta Calleja. They have a daughter named Roma.

== Career ==
Mejide joined the jury of Operación Triunfo on its fifth series and became known for his harsh comments, which often offended the contestants. He has been compared to Simon Cowell. In 2008 Mejide published his first book, El Pensamiento Negativo ("The Negative Thinking"). In 2009 he began to work as a songwriter and music producer, associating himself with Labuat.

In 2009, Mejide began to host his own show, titled G-20, on Telecinco, but it was cancelled shortly after its premiere due to low ratings. In 2011 he joined the jury of Tú sí que vales.

In 2014, he hosted three seasons of talk show Viajando con Chester on Cuatro. The show was renewed for a fourth season, but Mejide was replaced by journalist Pepa Bueno as his contract with Mediaset España terminated. A month later he was hired by Atresmedia, Mediaset's main competitor. In 2015, Mejide hosted two seasons of talk show Al rincón de pensar on Antena 3.

In 2016, Mejide was rehired by Mediaset España. Mejide joined the jury of talent show Got Talent España on its second season. He also hosted talk show Chester in Love on Cuatro. In 2017, a dating show hosted by Mejide and titled All You Need Is Love... O No premiered on Telecinco. In 2018, he joined the jury on talent show Factor X. Since 2019, Mejide hosts the current affairs talk show Todo es mentira, on Cuatro.
