= Enrique Ramil discography =

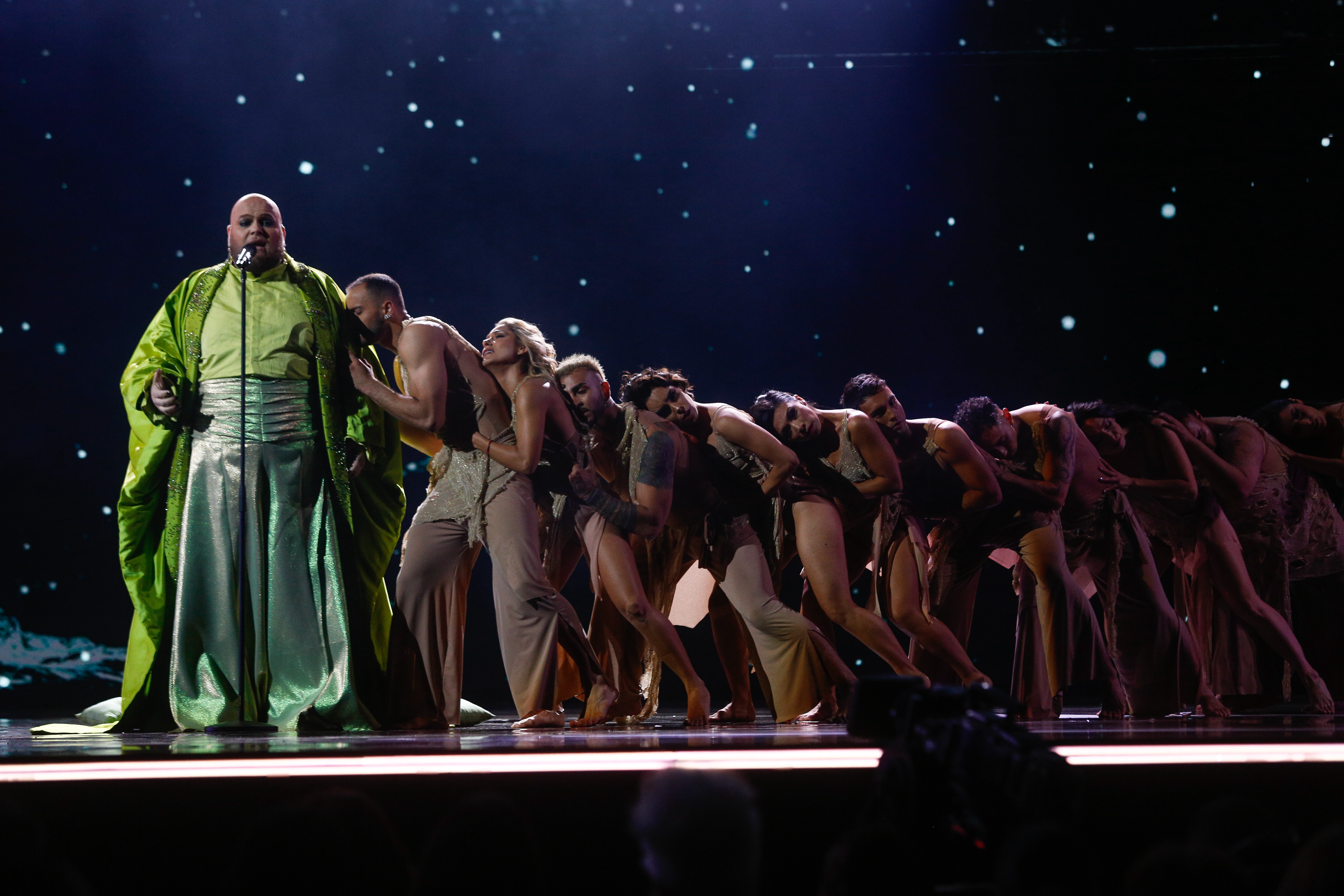
- Studio albums: 5
- EPs: 3
- Soundtrack albums: 3
- Singles: 28
- Music videos: 32

Enrique Ramil (born 18 June 1984 in Ares, La Coruña) is a Spanish singer, musician, songwriter and vocal coach. He is internationally well known because of the quality of his voice and performance. and has performed in Spain, Latin America and United States.

== Discography ==
=== Albums ===
| Year | Title | Details | Label |
|---|---|---|---|
| 2008 | V. O. | Release date: 2008; Format: CD | Independent Artist |
| 2011 | Juguetes Rotos | Release date: 2011; Format: CD, Digital, streaming | Tercera Planta |
| 2015 | Thank you | Release date: 2015; Format: CD | Independent Artist |
| 2019 | Ramil y una noches | Release Date: 2019; Formatos: CD, Digital, streaming | AGP Music |
| 2024 | La noche de las canciones perpetuas | Release Date: 2024; Formatos: Digital, streaming | Independent Artist |

=== EP ===
| Title | Details | Songs |
|---|---|---|
| Believe in Love | Release Date: 2012; Pride Barcelona 2012 Anthem | Believe in Love; Believe in Love (Orchestral version) ft. Aixa Romay and Julietta Barro |
| Volcanes | Release Date: 2019; Writers: Enrique Ramil and Antonio Ferrara; Label: AGP Music | Volcanes; Volcano (English Version); Volcanes (Charles Mattew & Exhodia Remix); Volcano (Charles Mattew & Exhodia Remix); Volcano (Freshstuff Remix); Volcano (Kris Nouk Remix); Volcano (Álvaro Albarrán Main Mix); Volcano (Álvaro Albarrán Original Remix); Volcano (Álvaro Albarrán Dub Mix); Volcano (Álvaro Albarrán Instrumental Mix); Volcano (Álvaro Albarrán Original Remix Radio Edit) |
| Paradise | Release Date: 2019; Writers: Enrique Ramil y Dani Vars; Label: AGP Music | Paradise; Paradise – Spanglish Version; Paradise – Dani Vars Remix |

=== Singles ===
| Year | Song | Album | Label |
|---|---|---|---|
| 2008 | «Remolino» | V. O. | Independent |
| 2008 | «Creo en mí» | V. O. | Independent |
| 2008 | «El loco» | V. O. | Independent |
| 2011 | «Juguetes Rotos» | Juguetes Rotos | Tercera Planta |
| 2011 | «Si me caigo...» | Juguetes Rotos | Tercera Planta |
| 2018 | «The Sound of Silence» | Factor X Directos | Sony Music |
| 2018 | «Hombres» | Factor X Directos | Sony Music |
| 2018 | «Toy» | Factor X Directos | Sony Music |
| 2018 | «Muera el amor» | Factor X Directos | Sony Music |
| 2019 | «Volcanes» | Volcanes | AGP Music |
| 2019 | «La gata bajo la lluvia» | Ramil y una noches | AGP Music |
| 2019 | «Perdóname» | Ramil y una noches | AGP Music |
| 2019 | «90 minutos» | Ramil y una noches | AGP Music |
| 2019 | «18 años» | Ramil y una noches | AGP Music |
| 2019 | «Paradise» | Paradise | AGP Music |
| 2020 | «90 minutos + Durmiendo sola» | Single | AGP Music |
| 2020 | «Señora + Se nos rompió el amor» | Single | AGP Music |
| 2020 | «Soy lo prohibido» | Single | AGP Music |
| 2020 | «A tu vera» | Single | AGP Music |
| 2021 | «Mentira» | Single | Castillera Music |
| 2021 | «Prefiero ser la otra» | Single | Castillera Music |
| 2021 | «Qué trabajo me da» | Single | Castillera Music |
| 2023 | «A la que vive contigo» | Single | Independent |
| 2023 | «Mi amante amigo» | Single | Independent |
| 2023 | «Lo dudo y Procuro olvidarte» | Single | Independent |
| 2023 | «La última vez» (for the Viña del Mar International Song Festival 2024) | Single | Independent |

=== Collaborations ===
| Year | Song | Album |
|---|---|---|
| 2011 | «Juguetes Rotos» (feat. Ainhoa Cantalapiedra) | Juguetes Rotos |
| 2011 | «Fios de vida» (feat. Maria do Ceo) | Juguetes Rotos |
| 2011 | «Mira hacia el cielo» (feat. Rosa Cedrón) | Juguetes Rotos |
| 2017 | «Ghetto Track» (collaboration with Vanilla Ace) | Single de Vanilla Ace – Club Sweat |
| 2019 | «Don't You Worry Child» (collaboration with Freshtuff) | Single de Freshcords |
| 2020 | «No somos inmortales» (collaboration with several artists) | Emergentes festival anthem |
| 2020 | «Leo» (collaboration with Alejandro de Pinedo) | Zodiac by Alejandro de Pinedo – AGP Music |
| 2020 | «Forgiveness» (collaboration with J Sanz) | Two Singles by J Sanz – Caresse Records |
| 2020 | «Time To Fly» (collaboration with Carlos Garo) | Single by Carlos Garo – Rocket Music |
| 2021 | «Lela» (duet with María Villalón) | Single |
| 2021 | «El Perdón» (duet with Diana Navarro) | Single |
| 2021 | «Prefiero ser la otra (ranchera)» (ft. Karina (Venezuelan singer)) | Single |
| 2021 | «Pride - I Feel So Good» (collaboration with Alejandro de Pinedo) | The Seven Deadly Sins by Alejandro de Pinedo |
| 2022 | «Búscate un hombre que te quiera» with Raquel Brandia | Single |
| 2023 | «Gracias a la vida» con Iria Cruz | Live covers from VisitAres, webseries |
| 2023 | «Hotel California» with | Live covers from VisitAres, webseries |
| 2023 | «Piensa en mí» Adriana Rogan y Rogan Raquel Brandía | Live covers from VisitAres, webseries |
| 2023 | «Piensa en mí» Adriana Rogan y Rogan Raquel Brandía | Live covers from VisitAres, webseries |
| 2023 | «Frente a frente» Javi Soleil | Live covers from VisitAres, webseries |
| 2023 | «Sargento de hierro» n María Villalón | Live covers from VisitAres, webseries |

== Soundtracks ==
- Believe in Love (Tercera Planta), Pride Barcelona 2012 official anthem.
- Scrooge: A Christmas Carol, Netflix, Galician version 2022
- VisitAres. YouTube. Different collaborations. 2023.

== Videoclips ==
| Year | Song | Directed by |
|---|---|---|
| 2009 | Es mi voluntad (preselección Eurovisión 2010) | |
| 2011 | Juguetes Rotos | Victor Moreno |
| 2012 | Si me caigo... | Cristina Fraga |
| 2012 | Believe in Love (Pride Barcelona 2012 Anthem) | Cristóbal Garrido |
| 2019 | Volcanes | Fran Granada |
| 2019 | Perdóname | David León |
| 2019 | 18 años | David León |
| 2019 | 90 minutos | David León |
| 2020 | You Make Me Feel So Young (Enrique Ramil & The Jazzifiers) | David León |
| 2020 | 90 minutos + Durmiendo sola | David León |
| 2020 | Señora + Se nos rompió el amor | David León |
| 2020 | Soy lo prohibido | David León |
| 2020 | A tu vera | David León |
| 2021 | El Perdón (duo con Diana Navarro) | David León |
| 2021 | Mentira | Alexander Escorcia |
| 2021 | Prefiero ser la otra | Alexander Escorcia |
| 2021 | Prefiero ser la otra - versión ranchera (dúo con Karina) | Frederick Melendez |
| 2021 | Qué trabajo me dá | David León |
| 2021 | El triste (versión voz en directo) | David León |
| 2021 | Farsante (versión voz en directo) | David León |
| 2022 | Mujer contra mujer | David León |
| 2022 | A la que vive contigo | David León |
| 2022 | Mi amante amigo | David León |
| 2022 | Volcanes (Acústico) ft. Adrián Solla y David Freigenedo | David León |
| 2022 | A la que venga | David León |
| 2022 | Inmensidad | David León |
| 2022 | A la sombra de un león | David León |
| 2022 | Búscate un hombre que te quiera ft. Raquel Brandia | David León |
| 2022 | Lo dudo y Procuro olvidarte | David León |
| 2022 | Soy rebelde | David León |
| 2023 | Cómo han pasado los años | David León |
| 2023 | No me queda más y Si la quieres (Homenaje a Selena) | David León |
| 2023 | Vete de mí | David León |
| 2023 | Y sin embargo te quiero | David León |
| 2023 | Gracias a la vida | David León |
| 2023 | Hotel California | David León |
| 2023 | La última vez (lyric video) | David León |
