= Enrique Ramil =

Spanish singer and musician (born 1984)

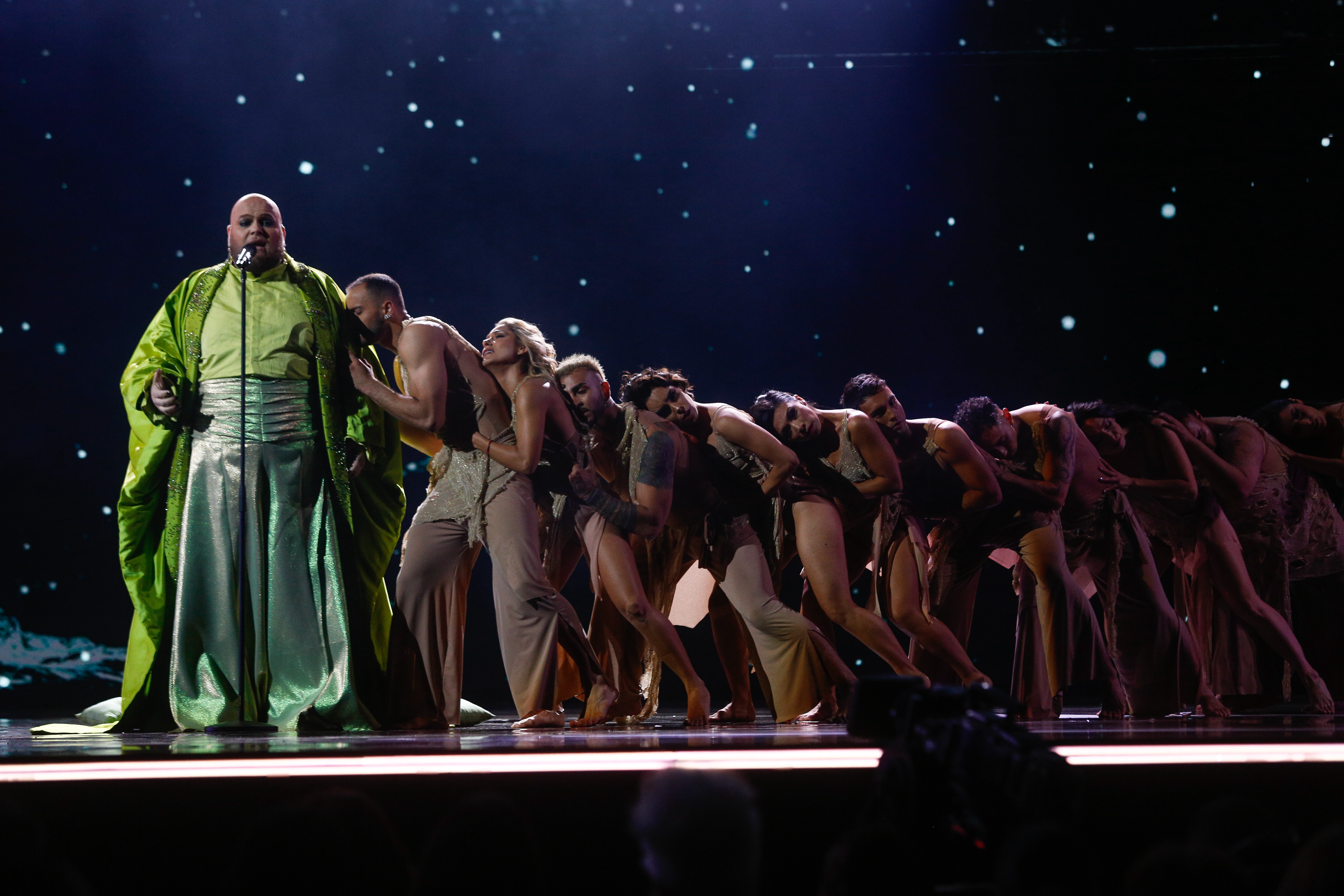
- Enrique Ramil at Viña del Mar Festival

Background information
- Born: Enrique Ramil; 18 June 1984 (age 42); Ares, Spain
- Genres: Pop; Jazz; Gospel; Ballad; Bossa Nova; Soul; Electronic
- Occupations: singer, songwriter and vocal coach
- Instrument: Vocals
- Years active: 2005–present
- Labels: Tercera Planta (2011), Sony Music (2018), AGP Music (2019-2020), Castillera Music (2021-present)
- Website: enriqueramil.com

Enrique Ramil (born 18 June 1984) is a Spanish singer, musician, songwriter and vocal coach.

He took part as contestant on different Spanish TV shows such as Operación Triunfo, The X Factor and won the second series of Tierra de Talento (2020). In 2024 he won the Silver Seagull for the Best International Performance in the Viña del Mar International Song Festival with the song ''La última vez''.

The singer is internationally well-known because of the quality of his voice and performance. He has released four studio albums: V. O. (2008), Juguetes Rotos (2011), Thank you (2015) and Ramil y una noches (2019), and more than twenty singles. He has performed in Spain, Latin America and United States.

== Career ==
Enrique Ramil was born on 18 June 1984 in Ares, Province of A Coruña, Spain. When he was three he joined the parish choir of his home town in Galicia.

At the age of nineteen he moved to Madrid where he attended singing and musical theatre lessons. His professional career started in 2005 and since then he has performed in lots of different stages such as streets of London, television, theatres...

Between 2006 and 2007 he becomes co-protagonist of the musical PaquitaDora in the role of Coco Mandala

=== 2008: V. O. ===
During that year his first album V. O. ("versión original" in Spanish) was released by Enrique Ramil as an independent artist. Produced by Edu and Sergio Del Val, the album includes special versions of meaningful songs for the artist. The singles released were Remolino, a cover of the famous song by Cuban singer Francisco Céspedes, Creo en mí, adaptation to Spanish of Believe by Yolanda Adams and El loco version of Il pazzo by Mina.

=== 2009–2010: Battle of the Choirs and other projects ===
In 2009 Enrique joined the TV show La batalla de los coros on Cuatro, (the Spanish version of the Australian show the Battle of the Choirs). He was part of the choir coordinated by the Spanish singer Marta Sánchez

During that year his song Es mi voluntad becomes part of the Spanish pre-selection for the Eurovision Song Contest 2010 The song reached number 28 among more than three hundred songs.

In 2010 he participated on the talent show Tu sí que vales, on Telecinco television channel.

=== 2011–2012: Operación Triunfo (Spanish TV series) and Juguetes Rotos ===
Enrique took part in the castings for the eighth season of the Spanish talent show OT 2011. He became one of the 16 contestants in the famous TV Academy. This show and the OT tour granted Enrique Ramil some recognition in Spain. That year he released his second musical project Juguetes Rotos featuring duets with Maria do Ceo, Ainhoa Cantalapiedra and Rosa Cedrón.

In 2012 he released Believe in LOVE, Pride Barcelona 2012 anthem. He also funded Mandala Gospel choir in Ares, his home town, that he directs till 2015. He also started working as vocal coach.

Between 2012 and 2013 he became a regular guest on the Galician TV show Heicho Cantar on TVG, featuring Mandala Gospel choir in one of the shows.

=== 2012-2018: London, The X Factor and Ramil y una noches ===
In 2015 he moved to London where he lived for two years. During his time in the capital city he became a street performer (busking). He joined the castings for the new seasons of The X Factor UK, reaching the famous six chairs challenge.

Back in Spain, in 2017 he performed with the Black Light Gospel Choir in La Voz and La Voz Kids on Telecinco. But he decided to join the castings for Factor X (Spanish TV series). He was chosen and he went to the live shows on television, reaching the finals.

=== 2019: Volcanes ===
After his time on The X Factor he went on the Ramil y una noches tour, singing versions of classic songs that he would release on a new musical project: Ramil y una noches.

He also launched a crowdfunding campaign to release Volcanes, his new original song and videoclip.

During 2019 he released several singles from Ramil y una noches, including covers of songs such as Perdóname written by Beatriz Luengo and originally sung by Ricky Martin, or 18 años an original song by Dalida firstly performed in Spanish by Luz Casal.

=== 2020: Tierra de Talento and the American Adventure ===
In 2020 Enrique Ramil became a contestant on the Canal Sur Televisión show Tierra de Talento. Judges such as India Martínez, José Mercé, Diana Navarro, Lola Índigo, Carlos Álvarez and Jesús Reina showed great admiration for his performances. He sang covers of songs originally performed by India Martínez, Vanesa Martín, Rocío Jurado or a medley from the Aladdin original soundtracks (on the role of the Genie).

On 25 July he became winner of that season after singing Alejandro Sanz's Mi soledad y yo

During September that same year international media announced that the artist would be flying to the US to record his new album. He would be collaborating with SanLuis, writers of songs for Marc Anthony, Prince Royce, among others.

He has also recorded duets in Spain with Diana Navarro, India Martínez and María Villalón produced by Alejandro Romero.

In October he releases the single "Soy lo prohibido", originally performed by Olga Guillot, but also other artists such as Natalia Lafourcade or Luis Miguel.

During his time in Miami, Enrique collaborates with Latin Grammy artist writing song for his new project. The Spanish Consulate in New York invited him to a showcase in 'Roommate Times Square'. He also performed the best of his repertoire in another showcase in Miami.

Back in Spain, the artist takes part in a homage to Manuel Alejandro, musician and writer of very famous Latin songs. National press highlighted his performance.

A the beginning of December, the singer releases "A tu vera", song written by Rafael de León and Juan Solano, originally performed by Spanish Lola Flores. This release was a present to his fans just before the release of the new song.

=== 2021: United States and Latin America - Mentira, Prefiero ser la otra and more ===
On 22 January the singer will release his new song and videoclip, recorded and filmed in Miami.

Canal Sur television invites Enrique Ramil to the New Year's special Tierra 2021. The artist sang in Galizian a duet with María Villalón. The chosen song was Lela, previously performed by Dulce Pontes .

On the 29 of January Enrique Ramil released Mentira, the first single in latinamerica. The song and videoclip were recorded in Miami and produced by the prestigious duet San Luis. Tierra de Talento (Spain) was the first stage for the first performance of the song. Promotion of the song continued in Panama, Guatemala and United States.

In March, Enrique Ramil was performed Mentira and was interviewed on "Hoy día", a tv show of Telemundo, where he also received a message from his admired Olga Tañón.

His new single, Prefiero ser la otra was released on April 2 that year. being popular in Latin America. Its videoclip was directed by Alexander Escorcia, same director of his previous videoclip "Mentira". The song was considered on the "most risky singles", because the singer performed it on the original gender it was written for: female. Esta canción fue presentada en el programa matutino estadounidense Despierta América. TV shows in USA and Latin America (Mega TV and Telemundo), prove the internacional interest for his music.

A ranchera version of Prefiero ser la otra was released featuring the Venezuelan singer Karina. Enrique Ramil homages Mexico with this version.

El artista sigue produciendo nuevos proyectos en Miami que irán conformando su siguiente disco.

On the 11 of June Qué trabajo me da is released. The singer describes this song as a mixture of Craig David and Juan Luis Guerra styles.

At the end of the year he performed in Osuna and Madrid. Then he started a tour on Latin America on voice and piano format. He visits Panama, Bogotá, Santiago, Mexico and Caracas. As a pre-tour promotion two live videoclips were released, directed by David León: El triste and original of Roberto Cantoral famously sung by José José andFarsante, written by Amaro Ferreiro, Iván Ferreiro and Miguel Conejo Torres.

== Discography ==
=== Albums ===
Year	Title	Details	Label
2008	V. O.	Release date: 2008; Format: CD	Independent Artist
2011	Juguetes Rotos	Release date: 2011; Format: CD, Digital, streaming	Tercera Planta
2015	Thank you	Release date: 2015; Format: CD	Independent Artist
2019	Ramil y una noches	Release Date: 2019; Formatos: CD, Digital, streaming	AGP Music

=== EP ===
Title	Details	Songs
Believe in Love	Release Date: 2012; Pride Barcelona 2012 Anthem	Believe in Love; Believe in Love (Orchestral version) ft. Aixa Romay and Julietta Barro
Volcanes	Release Date: 2019; Writers: Enrique Ramil and Antonio Ferrara; Label: AGP Music	Volcanes; Volcano (English Version); Volcanes (Charles Mattew & Exhodia Remix); Volcano (Charles Mattew & Exhodia Remix); Volcano (Freshstuff Remix); Volcano (Kris Nouk Remix); Volcano (Álvaro Albarrán Main Mix); Volcano (Álvaro Albarrán Original Remix); Volcano (Álvaro Albarrán Dub Mix); Volcano (Álvaro Albarrán Instrumental Mix); Volcano (Álvaro Albarrán Original Remix Radio Edit)
Paradise	Release Date: 2019; Writers: Enrique Ramil y Dani Vars; Label: AGP Music	Paradise; Paradise – Spanglish Version; Paradise – Dani Vars Remix

=== Singles ===
Year	Song	Album	Label
2008	«Remolino»	V. O.	Independent
2008	«Creo en mí»	V. O.	Independent
2008	«El loco»	V. O.	Independent
2011	«Juguetes Rotos»	Juguetes Rotos	Tercera Planta
2011	«Si me caigo...»	Juguetes Rotos	Tercera Planta
2018	«The Sound of Silence»	Factor X Directos	Sony Music
2018	«Hombres»	Factor X Directos	Sony Music
2018	«Toy»	Factor X Directos	Sony Music
2018	«Muera el amor»	Factor X Directos	Sony Music
2019	«Volcanes»	Volcanes	AGP Music
2019	«La gata bajo la lluvia»	Ramil y una noches	AGP Music
2019	«Perdóname»	Ramil y una noches	AGP Music
2019	«90 minutos»	Ramil y una noches	AGP Music
2019	«18 años»	Ramil y una noches	AGP Music
2019	«Paradise»	Paradise	AGP Music
2020	«90 minutos + Durmiendo sola»	Single	AGP Music
2020	«Señora + Se nos rompió el amor»	Single	AGP Music
2020	«Soy lo prohibido»	Single	AGP Music
2020	«A tu vera»	Single	AGP Music
2021	«Mentira»	Single	Castillera Music
2021	«Prefiero ser la otra»	Single	Castillera Music
2021	«Qué trabajo me da»	Single	Castillera Music

=== Collaborations ===
Year	Song	Album
2011	«Juguetes Rotos» (feat. Ainhoa Cantalapiedra)	Juguetes Rotos
2011	«Fios de vida» (feat. Maria do Ceo)	Juguetes Rotos
2011	«Mira hacia el cielo» (feat. Rosa Cedrón)	Juguetes Rotos
2017	«Ghetto Track» (collaboration with Vanilla Ace)	Single de Vanilla Ace – Club Sweat
2019	«Don't You Worry Child» (collaboration with Freshtuff)	Single de Freshcords
2020	«No somos inmortales» (collaboration with several artists)	Emergentes festival anthem
2020	«Leo» (collaboration with Alejandro de Pinedo)	Zodiac by Alejandro de Pinedo – AGP Music
2020	«Forgiveness» (collaboration with J Sanz)	Two Singles by J Sanz – Caresse Records
2020	«Time To Fly» (collaboration with Carlos Garo)	Single by Carlos Garo – Rocket Music
2021	«Lela» (duet with María Villalón)	Single
2021	«El Perdón» (duet with Diana Navarro)	Single
2021	«Prefiero ser la otra (ranchera)» (ft. Karina (Venezuelan singer))	Single
2021	«Pride - I Feel So Good» (collaboration with Alejandro de Pinedo)	The Seven Deadly Sins by Alejandro de Pinedo

=== Soundtracks ===
- Believe in Love (Tercera Planta), Pride Barcelona 2012 official anthem.
- Scrooge: A Christmas Carol, Netflix, Galician version 2022

== Filmography ==
- 2019: Volcanes: el documental produced by Funny Boys.
- 2023: VisitAres docu-series about Ares (A Coruña) with special guests.

== Videoclips ==
Year	Song	Directed by
2009	Es mi voluntad (Eurovision Song Contest 2010 pre-selection)	
2011	Juguetes Rotos	Victor Moreno
2012	Si me caigo...	Cristina Fraga
2012	Believe in Love (Pride Barcelona 2012 Anthem)	Cristóbal Garrido
2019	Volcanes	Fran Granada
2019	Perdóname	David León
2019	18 años	David León
2019	90 minutos	David León
2020	You Make Me Feel So Young (Enrique Ramil & The Jazzifiers)	David León
2020	90 minutos + Durmiendo sola	David León
2020	Señora + Se nos rompió el amor	David León
2020	Soy lo prohibido	David León
2020	A tu vera	David León
2021	"El Perdón" (duet with Diana Navarro)	David León
2021	"Mentira"	Alexander Escorcia
2021	Prefiero ser la otra - ranchera (ft. Karina)	Frederick Melendez
2021	Qué trabajo me da	David León
2021	El triste (live voice recording)	David León
2021	Farsante (live voice recording)	David León

== Tours ==
- 2007–2009: Cocó Mandala y Jazz Kidding
- 2009–2010: Enrique Ramil Quartet (Galicia)
- 2011: Gira OT 2011 (Spain)
- 2017–2020: Ramil y una noches (Spain)
- 2021: 2021 Tour (Spain, Panama, Bogotá, Santiago, Mexico and Caracas)
- 2023: Señoras de la canción (Spain)
- 2023: Con el corazón en la mano (Mexico)

== Musicals ==
- PaquitaDora – as Coco Mandala, co-protagonist – Spain, 2006 and 2007

== Television ==
Year	Show	Platform	Notes
2009	La batalla de los coros	Cuatro (TV channel)	Contestant, member of Marta Sánchez's choir
2010	Tú sí que vales	Telecinco	Contestant
2011	Operación Triunfo (Spanish TV series)	Telecinco	Contestant
2011	Land Rober – Tunai Show	TVG	Guest
2012 2013	Heicho Cantar	TVG	Guest to several shows including one where he sang with Mandala Gospel choir the song Mátame suave, a Galician cover of Killing Me Softly with His Song.
2015	O país mais grande do mundo	TVG	Guest
2018	Factor X (Spanish TV series)	Cuatro (TV channel)	Contestant and finalist
2019	Estando Contigo	CMM TV	Guest
2019	El legado de...	Canal Sur	Guest
2020	Tierra de Talento	Canal Sur	Contestant and winner of the series
2020	Tierra de Talento	Canal Sur	Guest with José Carlos Esteban-Hanza Fernández (winners of the second season of the show Tierra de Talento)
2020	La Tarde, aquí y ahora	Canal Sur	Guest featuring the pianist Alejandro Romero
2020	Tierra de Talento	Canal Sur	Duet with India Martínez featuring the pianist Alejandro Romero
2020	Música para mis oídos	Canal Sur	Invitado
2020	Tierra de talento	Canal Sur	Guest: duet with Mariola Cantarero
2021	Tierra de 2021	Canal Sur	Guest: duet with María Villalón
2021	Hoy día	Telemundo	Guest
2021	Chataing	Mega TV	Guest on Luis Chataing show from Miami
2021	Hoy día	Telemundo	Interview and presenting "Prefiero ser la otra"

== Awards and nominations ==
Year	Category	Award	Results
2020	Adults	Tierra de talento Canal Sur	Winner
