= Angy Fernández =

Spanish singer and actress

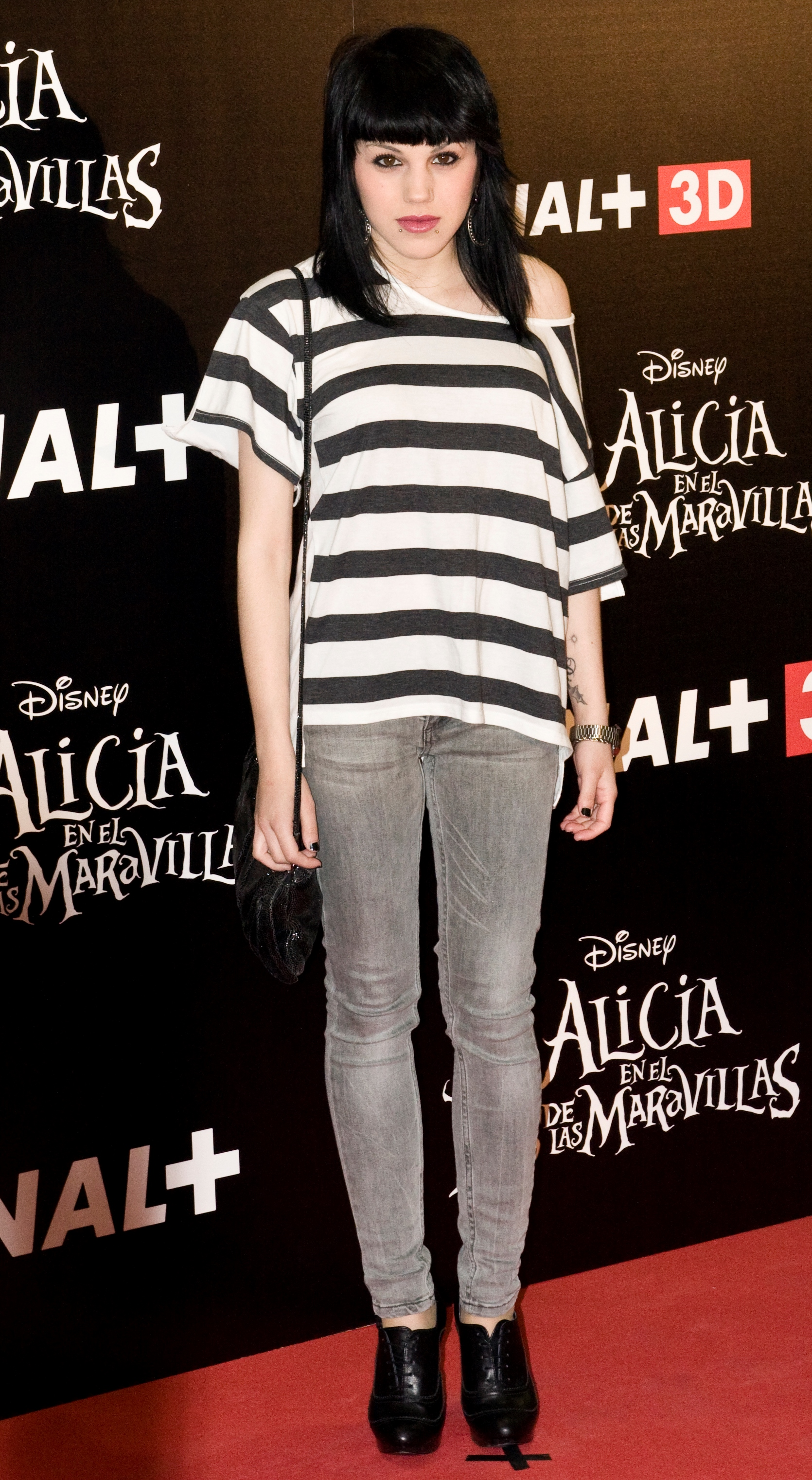
- Fernández at the Alice in Wonderland Spanish première in 2010
- Born: Ángela María Fernández González; 5 September 1990 (age 35); Palma de Mallorca, Spain
- Occupations: Singer; actress
- Years active: 2005–present

Ángela María "Angy" Fernández González (Spanish: [ˈaɲɟʝi feɾˈnandeθ]; born September 5, 1990) is a Spanish singer and actress known as Ángela María. Ángela's fame began to rise when she took part in competitive music show known as Factor X, she gained notoriety for her acting role as Paula in a teen drama television series, Física o Química. Additionally, she won the first series of competitive singing show Your Face Sounds Familiar.

== Early life ==
Fernández studied at the Josep María Llompart High School in her hometown of Palma de Mallorca, where she also took courses of piano and dance. She has an older sister called Irene.

== Career ==
In 2005, she was a member of the contest Cami De L'Exit in Majorca and worked for the local channel IB3 program Nit d'Exit.

In 2007, she took part in the singing competition series Factor X, where she finished as runner-up to María Villalón. The following year, she released her debut self-titled album.

Fernández competed in Benidorm Fest 2024, the Spanish selection for the Eurovision Song Contest 2024, with the song "Sé quién soy". She came second in her semi-final on 30 January 2024, qualifying for the final, where she finished third.

== Discography ==
=== Studio albums ===
List of studio albums, with selected details
Title	Details	Peak chart positions
Title	Details	SPA
Angy	Released: 12 February 2008; Label: Sony BMG; Formats: Physical, digital download, streaming	—
Drama Queen	Released: 7 May 2013; Label: Sony Music; Formats: Digital download, streaming	30

=== Singles ===
==== As lead artist ====
Single	Year	Peak chart positions	Album or EP
Single	Year	SPA	Album or EP
"Sola en el silencio"	2008	—	Angy
"No perder el control"	2010	—	Non-album singles
"Fisica o quimica"	2010	—	Non-album singles
"Si lo sientes"	2010	—	Non-album singles
"Solo un cuento"	2010	—	Non-album singles
"Quiero que me dejes salir"	2010	—	Non-album singles
"Mirar atras"	2010	—	Non-album singles
"Boytoy"	2013	34	Drama Queen
"Por que esperar?" (featuring Abraham Mateo)	2013	—	Non-album singles
"Sicky Coco" (with Tony Miggy)	2019	—	Non-album singles
"Dualidad"	2023	—	Non-album singles
"Sé quién soy"	2023	—	Non-album singles
"Malibú 2.0" (with Nerea Rodríguez)	2024	—	Non-album singles
"Sonido del Paraíso"	2025	—	Non-album singles
"No nos va tan mal"	2025	—	Non-album singles
"—" denotes a recording that did not chart or was not released in that territory.

==== As featured artist ====
Single	Year	Album or EP
"Vuelta a casa" (Sergio Rojas featuring Angy)	2019	Non-album single
"Mujeres ya!" (Alba Messa featuring Ainoa Buitrago, Angy, Ania, Mery Granados, Lolita De Sola, Natasha Dupeyrón, Soy Emilia, Violetta Arriaza, Volver, and Zemmoa)	2021	Non-album single

== Other ventures ==
=== Your Face Sounds Familiar ===
Angy was the winner of the first Tu cara me suena, the original version of Your Face Sounds Familiar worldwide. Among others, she made impressions of Lady Gaga, Cyndi Lauper and Christina Aguilera.

== Filmography ==
=== Television (nonfiction) ===
Year	Program	Channel	Notes
2007	Factor X	Cuatro	Participant
2011	Tu cara me suena	Antena 3	Participant
2012	Tu cara me suena: Especial Navidad	Antena 3	Participant
2012	Avanti ¡que pase el siguiente!	Antena 3	Collaborator
2013	Splash!	Antena 3	Participant
2013	Tu cara me suena	Antena 3	Special Guest
2013	Tu cara me suena	Antena 3	Participant
2014	Pequeños Gigantes España	Telecinco	Judge
2014	Un país de cuento	La 1	New Year's Eve special with José Mota
2014-2015	Todo va bien	Cuatro	Collaborator
2015-2018	Yutubers		Host
2016	Levántate All Stars	Telecinco	Participant
2017	El gran reto musical	La 1	Participant
2019	Hipnotízame	Antena 3	Collaborator
2019	Zapeando	LaSexta	Collaborator

=== Television (fiction) ===
Year	Title	Character	Channel	Notes
2008-2011	Física o Química	Paula Blasco Prieto	Antena 3	71 episodes
2012	Los protegidos	Estrella	Antena 3	1 episode
2013	¿XQ Esperar?	Angy		1 episode
2015	Gym Tony	Ángela	Cuatro	4 episodes
2016	Operación: And the Andarán	Ángela Merkel		TV movie
2018-2019	Bajo la red	Mireia	La 1	13 episodes
2018-2019	Amar es para siempre	Nieves Baeza	Antena 3	13 episodes
2019	Terror y feria		Antena 3	1 episode
2019	Bajo la red 2, la película	Mireia		TV movie
2020-2021	Física o Química: El reencuentro	Paula Blasco Prieto	Atresplayer Premium	2 episodes
2021	Pequeñas coincidencias	Marta	Amazon Prime Video	
2021	Yrreal	Lucía	RTVE Play	

=== Films ===
Year	Movie	Character	Director
2012	Ali	Manuela	Paco R. Baños
2012	Dr. Seuss' The Lorax	Audrey	Chris Renaud
2013	Justin y la espada del valor		Manuel Sicilia
2014	Torrente 5: Operación Eurovegas	Chiqui	Santiago Segura
2016	iAnimal: Through the Eyes of a Pig	Narrator	Shad Clark and José Valle
2016	Las invasoras	María	Víctor Conde
2017	Holy Camp!	Camp girl	Javier Ambrossi and Javier Calvo
2017	La canción del pirata	Marina	Laura de la Isla
