= Vocal Tempo =

Cuban vocal group

Vocal Tempo is a Cuban vocal group that won in 2008 the second series of Factor X, the Spanish version of The X Factor. The music contest was broadcast on the Spanish Cuatro television station.

The 6-member group, with all members from Cuba, is an a cappella group that does not use any musical instruments.

== Discography ==
=== Album ===
- 2009: Vocal Tempo

=== Single ===
- 2009: "La Casa Por El Tejado"

| Preceded by María Villalón | Factor X (Spain); Winner; 2008 | Succeeded by None |
