= Factor X (Spanish TV series) =

- Created by: Simon Cowell
- Presented by: Ion Aramendi (2024); Jesús Vázquez (2018); Nuria Roca (2007–2008)
- Judges: Willy Bárcenas (2024); Lali (2024); Abraham Mateo (2024); Vanesa Martín (2024); Laura Pausini (2018); Risto Mejide (2018); Xavi Martínez (2018); Fernando Montesinos (2018); Miqui Puig (2007–2008); Eva Perales (2007–2008); Jorge Flo (2007–2008)
- Country of origin: Spain
- No. of seasons: 4

Original release
- Network: Cuatro
- Release: 13 May 2007 – 12 November 2008
- Network: Telecinco
- Release: 13 April – 5 July 2018
- Release: 17 April – 10 June 2024

Factor X is the Spanish version of the British television music competition The X Factor, created by Simon Cowell. The show first aired on Cuatro between 2007 and 2008, following the British format from 2005 to 2006, with three categories, mentored by one judge each, whom choose the acts to represent the category in the live shows. The judges were singer and DJ Miqui Puig, music manager and headhunter Eva Perales and music radio producer Jorge Flo. Nuria Roca hosted the show. The first season was won by María Villalón. The second season was won by Vocal Tempo.

On 27 September 2017, Telecinco announced the revival of the series with the production of a new season, hosted by Jesús Vázquez. On 19 December it was announced that the panel of mentors would consist of singer Laura Pausini, publicist and television personality Risto Mejide, radio host Xavi Martínez, and musician and music producer Fernando Montesinos. Nando Escribano hosted the side show Xtra Factor, which aired on Divinity. In 2019 it was initially announced that Telecinco renewed the series for a fourth season, but Fremantle España CEO Nathalie García stated later in the year that there were no plans for a new season. In January 2024, it was reported that Telecinco was once again planning to relaunch the format, with a fourth season due to begin in the spring.

== Season summary ==
"16-24s" category
"Boys" category
"Girls" category
"Over 25s" category
"Groups" category
Categories not used that season

Season	Start	Finish	Winner	Runner-up	Third place	Winning mentor	Presenter	Judges
1	13 May 2007	16 July 2007	María Villalón	Angy Fernández	Walter Renato	Jorge Flo	Nuria Roca	Jorge Flo; Eva Perales; Miqui Puig
2	22 September 2008	12 November 2008	Vocal Tempo	Laura Gónzalez	Élanis	Jorge Flo	Nuria Roca	Jorge Flo; Eva Perales; Miqui Puig
3	13 April 2018	5 July 2018	Pol Granch	Elena Farga	Samuel Hernández	Laura Pausini	Jesús Vázquez	Laura Pausini; Risto Mejide; Xavi Martínez; Fernando Montesinos
4	17 April 2024	10 June 2024	Aye Alfonso	Teete	Coral Vicenti	Abraham Mateo	Ion Aramendi	Willy Bárcenas; Lali; Abraham Mateo; Vanesa Martín

== Judges' categories and their contestants ==
In each season, each judge is allocated a category to mentor and chooses acts to progress to the live shows. This table shows, for each season, which category each judge was allocated and which acts he or she put through to the live shows.

Key:

– Winning judge/category. Winners are in bold, eliminated contestants in small font.

Season	Jorge Flo	Eva Perales	Miqui Puig	—N/a
1	**16-24s** **María Villalón**; Angy Fernández; Walter Renato; Ailyn	**Over 25s** Pedro Heredia; Leire Martínez; David Hooper; Yolanda Yugueros	**Groups**; United; Sometimes; Lady's; Mr. Roch	—N/a
2	**Groups**; **Vocal Tempo**; Élanis; Alikindoi; New Boys; Lunáticas	**16-24s** Laura Gónzalez; Gera Marquez; Mario Gómez; Marta Cabrera; Javier Luis Delgado; Miriam Milanés	**Over 25s** Dunia Trujillo; María López; Alex; Jer; Evelyn Evangelisti	—N/a
Season	Risto Mejide	Laura Pausini	Fernando Montesinos	Xavi Martínez
3	**Girls**; Elena Farga; Poupie; Fusa Nocta	**Boys**; **Pol Granch**; Samuel Hernández; El Niño Bermejo	**Over 25s** Gema Tomás; Enrique Ramil; Oscárboles	**Groups**; W-Caps; Malva; Noah
Season	Willy Bárcenas	Lali Espósito	Vanesa Martín	Abraham Mateo
4*	Awy; Danel; Nacho Nacif	Jürgen; Samuel Nagati; Mix Band	Teete; Lucía Moreno; J Prince	**Aye Alfonso**; Coral Vicenti; Patrick Bel

(*) Categories were not used in this season.

== Season 1 (2007) ==
The first season started its run on Sunday 13 May 2007. The show was then broadcast nightly with 'Los Castings' (the auditions), which lasted until 20 May 2007. From the 21 May until 27 May 2007 'La Selección Final' (final selection) was shown, again nightly. On 28 May 'Las Galas' (live shows) began. Factor X proved successful for TV channel Cuatro. It achieved an average rating of 12.3%. Factor X live shows were shown at 10pm every Monday evening.

=== Contestants ===
Key:

Winner
Runner-up

Category (mentor)	Acts			
16-24s (Flo)	Ailyn	Angy Fernández	Walter Renato	María Villalón
Over 25s (Perales)	Pedro Heredia	David Hooper	Leire Martínez	Yolanda Yugueros
Groups (Puig)	Lady's	Mr. Roch	Sometimes	United

=== Results summary ===
– Contestant announced as safe (no particular order)
– Contestant was in the bottom two/three and had to sing again in the final showdown
– Contestant was in the bottom three but received the fewest votes and was immediately eliminated
– Contestant received the fewest public votes and was immediately eliminated (no final showdown)

	Week 1	Week 2	Week 3	Week 4	Week 5	Week 6	Week 7	Week 8		
	Week 1	Week 2	Week 3	Week 4	Week 5	Week 6	Week 7	Round 1	Round 2	Round 3
María	Safe	Safe	Safe	Safe	Safe	Safe	Safe	Safe	Safe	Winner (Week 8)
Angy	Safe	Safe	Safe	Safe	Safe	Safe	Safe	Safe	Safe	Runner-Up (Week 8)
Walter	Safe	Safe	Safe	Safe	Bottom 2	Safe	Safe	Safe	3rd	Eliminated (Week 8)
United	Safe	Safe	Safe	Safe	Safe	Safe	Bottom 2	4th	Eliminated (Week 8)	
Pedro	Safe	Safe	Safe	Safe	Safe	Bottom 2	Bottom 2	Eliminated (Week 7)		
Leire	Safe	Safe	Bottom 2	Safe	Safe	Bottom 2	Eliminated (Week 6)			
Sometimes	Safe	Safe	Safe	Bottom 3	Bottom 2	Eliminated (Week 5)				
Ailyn	Safe	Bottom 2	Safe	Bottom 3	Eliminated (Week 4)					
David	Safe	Safe	Safe	9th	Eliminated (Week 4)					
Yolanda	Bottom 2	Safe	Bottom 2	Eliminated (Week 3)						
Lady's	Safe	Bottom 2	Eliminated (Week 2)							
Mr. Roch	Bottom 2	Eliminated (Week 1)								
Final showdown	Mr. Roch; Yolanda	Lady's; Ailyn	Leire; Yolanda	Sometimes; Ailyn	Sometimes; Walter	Pedro; Leire	United; Pedro	No bottom two/judges' vote; public votes alone decide who is eliminated		
Judges voted to	Eliminate							No bottom two/judges' vote; public votes alone decide who is eliminated		
Puig's vote	Yolanda	Ailyn	Leire	Ailyn	Walter	Pedro	Pedro	No bottom two/judges' vote; public votes alone decide who is eliminated		
Perales's vote	Mr. Roch	Lady's	Yolanda	Ailyn	Sometimes	Leire	United	No bottom two/judges' vote; public votes alone decide who is eliminated		
Flo's vote	Mr. Roch	Lady's	Yolanda	Sometimes	Sometimes	Leire	Pedro	No bottom two/judges' vote; public votes alone decide who is eliminated		
Eliminated	Mr. Roch; 2 of 3 votes to eliminate	Lady's; 2 of 3 votes to eliminate	Yolanda; 2 of 3 votes to eliminate	David; Public vote to save	Sometimes; 2 of 3 votes to eliminate	Leire; 2 of 3 votes to eliminate	Pedro; 2 of 3 votes to eliminate	United; Public vote to win	Walter; Public vote to win	Angy; 48% to win
Eliminated	Mr. Roch; 2 of 3 votes to eliminate	Lady's; 2 of 3 votes to eliminate	Yolanda; 2 of 3 votes to eliminate	Ailyn; 2 of 3 votes to eliminate	Sometimes; 2 of 3 votes to eliminate	Leire; 2 of 3 votes to eliminate	Pedro; 2 of 3 votes to eliminate	United; Public vote to win	Walter; Public vote to win	María; 52% to win

== Season 2 (2008) ==
The second season started its run 1 September 2008 with the auditions. The first "gala" or live show was aired on 22 September, on primetime. In a similar fashion to the last seasons in the original British version, each gala had a different theme (number-one hits or 80's music, for example). Five acts were chosen for the finals in each category, and an additional contestant was chosen in the middle of the season through Internet auditions

=== Contestants ===
Key:

Winner
Runner-up

Category (mentor)	Acts					
16-24s (Perales)	Marta Cabrera	Javier Luis Delgado	Mario Gómez	Laura Gónzalez	Gera Marquez	Miriam Milanés
Over 25s (Puig)	Alex	Evelyn Evangelisti	Jer	María López	Dunia Trujillo	
Groups (Flo)	Alikindoi	Élanis	Lunáticas	New Boys	Vocal Tempo	

=== Results summary ===
– Contestant did not against public vote
– Contestant announced as safe (no particular order)
– Contestant was in the bottom two/three and had to sing again in the final showdown
– Contestant was in the bottom three but received the fewest votes and was immediately eliminated
– Contestant received the fewest public votes and was immediately eliminated (no final showdown)

	Week 1			Week 2	Week 3	Week 4	Week 5		Week 6	Week 7	Week 8		
	Groups	16 to 24's	Over 25's	Week 2	Week 3	Week 4	New Act	Regular	Week 6	Week 7	Round 1	Round 2	Round 3
Vocal Tempo	Safe			Safe	Safe	Safe		Safe	Safe	Safe	Safe	Safe	Winner (Week 8)
Laura	Not in the competition						1st	Safe	Safe	Safe	Safe	Safe	Runner-Up (Week 8)
Élanis	Safe			Safe	Safe	Safe		Safe	Safe	Bottom 3	Safe	3rd	Eliminated (Week 8)
Gera		Safe		Safe	Safe	Safe		Bottom 2	Safe	Safe	4th	Eliminated (Week 8)	
Dunia			Safe	Safe	Safe	Safe		Safe	Safe	Safe	5th	Eliminated (Week 8)	
María			Safe	Bottom 2	Safe	Bottom 2		Safe	Safe	Bottom 3	Eliminated (Week 7)		
Alex			Safe	Safe	Safe	Safe		Safe	Bottom 3	7th	Eliminated (Week 7)		
Alikindoi	Safe			Safe	Safe	Safe		Safe	Bottom 3	Eliminated (Week 6)			
Mario		Safe		Safe	Safe	Safe		Safe	9th	Eliminated (Week 6)			
Marta		Safe		Safe	Bottom 2	Safe		Bottom 2	Eliminated (Week 5)				
Brigitte	Not in the competition						2nd	Eliminated (Week 5)					
Altea	Not in the competition						3rd	Eliminated (Week 5)					
New Boys	Bottom 2			Safe	Safe	Bottom 2	Eliminated (Week 4)						
Javier Luis		Bottom 2		Safe	Bottom 2	Eliminated (Week 3)							
Jer			Bottom 2	Bottom 2	Eliminated (Week 2)								
Evelyn			Bottom 2	Eliminated (Week 1)									
Miriam		Bottom 2	Eliminated (Week 1)										
Lunáticas	Bottom 2	Eliminated (Week 1)											
Final showdown	Lunáticas; New Boys	Miriam; Javier Luis	Evelyn; Jer	Jer; María	Javier Luis; Marta	María; New Boys	N/A	Marta; Gera	Alikindoi; Alex	María; Élanis	No bottom two/judges' vote; public votes alone decide who is eliminated		
Judges voted to	Eliminate						N/A	Eliminate			No bottom two/judges' vote; public votes alone decide who is eliminated		
Puig's vote	Lunáticas	Miriam	Evelyn	Jer	Javier Luis	New Boys	N/A	Marta	Alikindoi	Élanis	No bottom two/judges' vote; public votes alone decide who is eliminated		
Perales's vote	New Boys	Miriam	Evelyn	Jer	Javier Luis	New Boys	N/A	Marta	Alikindoi	María	No bottom two/judges' vote; public votes alone decide who is eliminated		
Flo's vote	Lunáticas	Miriam	Jer	María	Javier Luis	María	N/A	Marta	Alex	María	No bottom two/judges' vote; public votes alone decide who is eliminated		
Eliminated	Lunáticas; 2 of 3 votes to eliminate	Miriam; 3 of 3 votes to eliminate	Evelyn; 2 of 3 votes to eliminate	Jer; 2 of 3 votes to eliminate	Javier Luis; 3 of 3 votes to eliminate	New Boys; 2 of 3 votes to eliminate	Laura; Public vote to enter	Marta; 3 of 3 votes to eliminate	Mario; Public vote to save	Alex; Public vote to save	Dunia; Public vote to win	Élanis; Public vote to win	Laura; Public vote to win
Eliminated	Lunáticas; 2 of 3 votes to eliminate	Miriam; 3 of 3 votes to eliminate	Evelyn; 2 of 3 votes to eliminate	Jer; 2 of 3 votes to eliminate	Javier Luis; 3 of 3 votes to eliminate	New Boys; 2 of 3 votes to eliminate	Laura; Public vote to enter	Marta; 3 of 3 votes to eliminate	Alikindoi; 2 of 3 votes to eliminate	María; 2 of 3 votes to eliminate	Gera; Public vote to win	Élanis; Public vote to win	Vocal Tempo; Public vote to win

== Season 3 (2018) ==
The third season premiered on Telecinco on 13 April 2018, ten years after its run on Cuatro.

=== Contestants ===
Key:

– Winner
– Runner-up

Category (mentor)	Acts		
Boys (Pausini)	El Niño Bermejo	Pol Granch	Samuel Hernández
Girls (Mejide)	Elena Farga	Fusa Nocta	Poupie
Over 25s (Montesinos)	Enrique Ramil	Gema Tomás	Oscárboles
Groups (Martínez)	Malva	Noah	W-Caps

=== Results summary ===
– Contestant announced as safe (no particular order unless noted otherwise)
– Contestant was in the bottom two/three/four and had to sing again in the final showdown
– Contestant was in the bottom three/four but received the fewest votes and was eliminated
– Contestant was in the bottom four but received the most votes and was saved
– Contestant received the fewest public votes and was immediately eliminated (no final showdown)

	Week 1	Week 2	Week 3	Week 4	Week 5	
	Week 1	Week 2	Week 3	Week 4	Round 1	Round 2
Pol	Safe	Safe	Safe	Safe	Safe	Winner (Week 5)
Elena	1st	Safe	Safe	Safe	Safe	Runner-Up (Week 5)
Samuel	Safe	Safe	Safe	3rd	3rd	Eliminated (Week 5)
W-Caps	Safe	Safe	Safe	Bottom 4	4th	Eliminated (Week 5)
Poupie	Safe	Safe	8th	Bottom 4	Eliminated (Week 4)	
Malva	Safe	Safe	Safe	6th	Eliminated (Week 4)	
Gema	11th	Bottom 2	Safe	7th	Eliminated (Week 4)	
Enrique Ramil	Safe	Safe	Safe	8th	Eliminated (Week 4)	
Fusa Nocta	Safe	Safe	9th	Eliminated (Week 3)		
Noah	Safe	Safe	10th	Eliminated (Week 3)		
Oscárboles	Safe	Bottom 2	Eliminated (Week 2)			
El Niño Bermejo	12th	Eliminated (Week 1)				
Final showdown	El Niño Bermejo; Gema	Gema; Oscárboles	Fusa Nocta; Poupie	Malva; Poupie; Samuel; W-Caps	No bottom two/judges' vote; public votes alone decide who is eliminated	
Judges voted to	Eliminate				No bottom two/judges' vote; public votes alone decide who is eliminated	
Mejide's vote	El Niño Bermejo	Oscárboles	Poupie	Poupie	No bottom two/judges' vote; public votes alone decide who is eliminated	
Pausini's vote	Gema	Oscárboles	Fusa Nocta	W-Caps	No bottom two/judges' vote; public votes alone decide who is eliminated	
Martínez's vote	Gema	Oscárboles	Fusa Nocta	Poupie	No bottom two/judges' vote; public votes alone decide who is eliminated	
Montesinos's vote	El Niño Bermejo	Oscárboles	Poupie	Poupie	No bottom two/judges' vote; public votes alone decide who is eliminated	
Eliminated	El Niño Bermejo; 2 of 4 votes Deadlock	Oscárboles; 4 of 4 votes Majority	Noah; Public vote to save	Enrique Ramil; Public vote to save	W-Caps; Public vote to win	Elena; Public vote to win
Eliminated	El Niño Bermejo; 2 of 4 votes Deadlock	Oscárboles; 4 of 4 votes Majority	Noah; Public vote to save	Gema; Public vote to save	W-Caps; Public vote to win	Elena; Public vote to win
Eliminated	El Niño Bermejo; 2 of 4 votes Deadlock	Oscárboles; 4 of 4 votes Majority	Fusa Nocta; 2 of 4 votes Deadlock	Malva; Public vote to save	Samuel; Public vote to win	Pol; Public vote to win
Eliminated	El Niño Bermejo; 2 of 4 votes Deadlock	Oscárboles; 4 of 4 votes Majority	Fusa Nocta; 2 of 4 votes Deadlock	Poupie; 3 of 4 votes Majority	Samuel; Public vote to win	Pol; Public vote to win

=== Live show details ===
==== Week 1 (8 June 2018) ====
Contestants' performances on the first live show
Act	Order	Song	Result
Enrique Ramil	1	"The Sound of Silence"	Safe
Malva	2	"Termodinámica" (original song)	Safe
Elena Farga	3	"Viva la Vida"	Safe
Samuel Hernández	4	"Locked Out of Heaven"	Safe
W-Caps	5	"Team"	Safe
Fusa Nocta	6	"En la ruina" (original song)	Safe
El Niño Bermejo	7	"Desde la azotea"	Bottom two
Noah	8	"Kiss the Sky"	Safe
Gema Tomás	9	"We Are Young"	Bottom two
Pol Granch	10	"Pompeii" (Note: Originally, Pol was supposed to perform "Heaven" by Bryan Adams, but requested to change the song at the final rehearsals.)	Safe
Oscárboles	11	"La mirona y el exhibicionista" (original song)	Safe
Poupie	12	"Ex's & Oh's"	Safe
Sing-off details
Gema Tomás	1	"I Am"	Safe
El Niño Bermejo	2	"90 minutos"	Eliminated

Judges vote to eliminate

- Montesinos: El Niño Bermejo
- Pausini: Gema Tomás
- Mejide: El Niño Bermejo
- Martínez: Gema Tomás

==== Week 2 (15 June 2018) ====
Contestants' performances on the second live show
Act	Order	Song	Result
Malva	1	"El universo sobre mí"	Safe
Gema Tomás	2	"Runnin' (Lose It All)"	Bottom two
Pol Granch	3	"Je l'aime à mourir"	Safe
Poupie	4	"Dark Horse"	Safe
Noah	5	"Ciudad de lila" (original song)	Safe
Samuel Hernández	6	"Jealous"	Safe
W-Caps	7	"Leave a Light On"	Safe
Oscárboles	8	"La canción del verano" (original song)	Bottom two
Fusa Nocta	9	"Who's Real" (original song)	Safe
Enrique Ramil	10	"Hombres"	Safe
Elena Farga	11	"Crazy"	Safe
Sing-off details
Oscárboles	1	Medley of original songs	Eliminated
Gema Tomás	2	"Recovery"	Safe

Judges vote to eliminate

- Mejide: Oscárboles
- Pausini: Oscárboles
- Martínez: Oscárboles
- Montesinos: Oscárboles (initially tried to refuse to vote because both acts in the sing-off were from his category and, since everyone else had already voted to eliminate Oscárboles, his vote wouldn't really make a difference; only cast a vote when host Jesús Vázquez insisted that he had to because of the show's rules)

==== Week 3 (22 June 2018) ====
Contestants' performances on the third live show
Act	Order	Song	Result
Samuel Hernández	1	"Me Rehúso"	Safe
Enrique Ramil	2	"Toy"	Safe
Poupie	3	"Me niego"	Bottom three
Noah	4	"Eye of the Tiger"	Eliminated
Elena Farga	5	"Mujer contra mujer"	Safe
Malva	6	"Borneo" (original song)	Safe
Gema Tomás	7	"Contigo soy" (original song)	Safe
Pol Granch	8	"Perfect"	Safe
Fusa Nocta	9	"Chicochao" (original song)	Bottom three
W-Caps	10	"Crazy in Love"	Safe
Sing-off details
Fusa Nocta	1	"Back to Black"	Eliminated
Poupie	2	"Man Down"	Saved

Judges vote to eliminate

- Montesinos: Poupie
- Martínez: Fusa Nocta
- Pausini: Fusa Nocta
- Mejide: Poupie (both acts in the sing-off were from his category; he requested to be the last to vote so that he could force a deadlock and leave the decision in the audience's hands)

==== Week 4 (29 June 2018) ====
Contestants' performances on the fourth live show
Act	Order	Song	Result
Enrique Ramil	1	"Muera el amor"	Eliminated
W-Caps	2	"Hymn for the Weekend"	Bottom four
Pol Granch	3	"Pausa"	Safe
Poupie	4	"New Rules"	Bottom four
Malva	5	"Nostalgia soy" (original song)	Bottom four
Gema Tomás	6	"Lost on You"	Eliminated
Samuel Hernández	7	"Wake Me Up"	Bottom four
Elena Farga	8	"Billie Jean"	Safe
Sing-off details
Samuel Hernández	1	"Say You Won't Let Go"	Saved
Malva	2	"Sinceridad" (original song)	Eliminated
Poupie	3	"When I Was Your Man"	Eliminated
W-Caps	4	"Waves"	Saved

Judges vote to eliminate

- Mejide: Poupie (voted in favor of W-Caps, an act from Martínez's category, voting against Poupie from his category)
- Pausini: W-Caps
- Martínez: Poupie
- Montesinos: Poupie

==== Week 5 (5 July 2018) ====
Contestants' performances on the fifth live show
Act	Order	First song	Order	Second song	Result
First round
Pol Granch	1	"El Sitio de Mi Recreo"	5	"Mad World" (Note: Malva's Alejandro Sotomayor accompanied Pol at the piano.)	Advanced
Elena Farga	2	"Set Fire to the Rain"	6	"Aunque tú no lo sepas" (Note: Also sang a few notes of "With or Without You" at the end.)	Advanced
W-Caps	3	"Lo siento"	7	"Dusk Till Dawn"	Eliminated
Samuel Hernández	4	"All of Me"	8	"Despacito"	Eliminated
Second round
Pol Granch	1	"Le chant des sirènes"			Winner
Elena Farga	2	"I Will Always Love You"			Runner-up

=== Ratings ===
Factor X consolidated viewership and adjusted position Colour key: – Highest rating during the season (nominal) – Lowest rating during the season (nominal)
Episode	Original airdate	Timeslot	Viewers (millions)	Share	Night Rank	Source
"Auditions - Part 1"	13 April 2018	Friday 10 pm	2.46	17.2%	#1	
"Auditions - Part 2"	18 April 2018	Wednesday 10 pm	1.96	16.0%	#2	
"Auditions - Part 3"	25 April 2018	Wednesday 10 pm	1.96	15.7%	#2	
"Auditions - Part 4"	2 May 2018	Wednesday 10 pm	1.95	15.7%	#2	
"Auditions - Part 5"	9 May 2018	Wednesday 10 pm	1.98	16.5%	#2	
"Five Chair Challenge - Part 1"	16 May 2018	Wednesday 10 pm	1.90	15.5%	#1	
"Five Chair Challenge - Part 2"	25 May 2018	Friday 10 pm	1.68	13.0%	#2	
"Final Decision"	1 June 2018	Friday 10 pm	1.23	10.0%	#4	
"Live Show 1"	8 June 2018	Friday 10 pm	1.17	9.7%	#4	
"Live Show 2"	15 June 2018	Friday 11 pm	1.13	10.7%	#3	
"Live Show 3"	22 June 2018	Friday 10 pm	1.03	9.6%	#5	
"Live Show 4 - Semi Final"	29 June 2018	Friday 10 pm	1.00	9.4%	#5	
"Live Show 5 - Final"	5 July 2018	Thursday 10 pm	1.10	9.9%	#4	

== Season 4 (2024) ==
Telecinco initially announced a fourth season for 2019. Alejandro Sanz and Isabel Pantoja were offered a slot in the jury, but both reportedly declined. In November 2019, the CEO of Fremantle Spain, Nathalie García, stated that there were no plans for a new season.

After the format stayed dormant for five more years, in January 2024 it was reported that Telecinco was working on bringing back the format for a fourth season, which was tentatively slated to begin in the spring of the same year. In February, Ion Aramendi was announced as the new host. By early March, the new panel of judges was confirmed to be made up of Willy Bárcenas, Lali, Abraham Mateo and Vanesa Martín. This season abandoned the format's traditional division in categories, meaning the four judges will form their teams including either solo acts or groups, with no gender- or age-based restrictions.

Due to poor ratings, the six live shows planned for the competition's final stage were reduced to three, with the final taking place on 10 June.

=== Contestants ===
Key:

– Winner
– Runner-up

Mentor	Acts		
Willy Bárcenas	Nacho Nacif*	Awy	Danel
Lali	Mix Band	Jürgen	Samuel Nagati
Abraham Mateo	Patrick Bel	Aye Alfonso	Coral Vicenti
Vanesa Martín	Teete	Lucía Moreno	J Prince

(*) Nacho Nacif replaced Zoe Ravier, who had to withdraw from the competition for personal reasons.

=== Results summary ===
– Contestant announced as safe
– Contestant was in the bottom three
– Contestant received the fewest public votes and was immediately eliminated

	Week 1	Week 2	Week 3	
	Week 1	Week 2	Round 1	Round 2
Aye	Safe	Safe	Safe	Winner (Week 3)
Teete	Safe	Safe	Safe	Runner-up (Week 3)
Coral	Safe	Safe	Safe	3rd place (Week 3)
Patrick	Safe	Safe	Safe	4th place (Week 3)
Jürgen	Safe	Safe	Out	Eliminated (Week 3)
Awy	Safe	Safe	Out	Eliminated (Week 3)
Samuel	Safe	Bottom three	Out	Eliminated (Week 3)
Lucía	Safe	Safe	Out	Eliminated (Week 3)
Mix Band	Safe	Bottom three	Eliminated (Week 2)	
J Prince	10th	10th	Eliminated (Week 2)	
Danel	11th	Eliminated (Week 1)		
Nacho	12th	Eliminated (Week 1)		
Final showdown	Danel; J Prince	Mix Band; Samuel Nagati	No final showdown or judges' vote	
Judges voted to	Eliminate		No final showdown or judges' vote	
Vanesa's vote	Danel	Mix Band	No final showdown or judges' vote	
Willy's vote	J Prince	Samuel Nagati	No final showdown or judges' vote	
Abraham's vote	Danel	Mix Band	No final showdown or judges' vote	
Lali's vote	J Prince	Mix Band	No final showdown or judges' vote	
Eliminated	Nacho Nacif; Public vote to save	J Prince; Public vote to save	Lucía Moreno; Public vote to advance	Patrick Bel; Public vote to win
Eliminated	Nacho Nacif; Public vote to save	J Prince; Public vote to save	Samuel Nagati; Public vote to advance	Coral Vicenti; Public vote to win
Eliminated	Danel; 2 of 4 votes Deadlock	Mix Band; 3 of 4 votes Majority vote	Awy; Public vote to advance	Teete; Public vote to win
Eliminated	Danel; 2 of 4 votes Deadlock	Mix Band; 3 of 4 votes Majority vote	Jürgen; Public vote to advance	Aye Alfonso; Public vote to win

=== Live show details ===
==== Semi Final 1 (27 May) ====
- Group performance: "Maníaca" / "Quiero decirte" (Abraham Mateo and his team)
- Musical guest: Taburete ("Botines")

Act	Order	Song	Result
Coral Vicenti	1	"Toxic"	Safe
Awy	2	"El principio de algo"	Safe
Teete	3	"Sevilla"	Safe
Jürgen	4	"The Way You Make Me Feel"	Safe
Lucía Moreno	5	"Si quieres"	Safe
Patrick Bel	6	"Careless Whisper"	Safe
Danel	7	"Antes de que cuente diez"	Eliminated
Mix Band	8	"¿Cómo pasó?"	Safe
J Prince	9	"Treat You Better"	Bottom three
Nacho Nacif	10	"Beautiful Things"	Immediately eliminated
Aye Alfonso	11	"Mi Ex Tenía Razón"	Safe
Samuel Nagati	12	"Another Love"	Safe

Judges' vote to eliminate

- Vanesa: Danel (voted in favor of J Prince from her own team, believing J had more to offer)
- Abraham: Danel (believed J Prince had more potential in regards to a future career)
- Willy: J Prince (voted in favor of Danel from his own team, citing his belief in him)
- Lali: J Prince (decided to force a deadlock and leave the decision in the audience's hands)

As a result of the deadlock, the second elimination was decided from the earlier audience vote results. Danel, who had finished second-to-last in the audience vote, was eliminated along with last-placed Nacho Nacif.

==== Semi Final 2 (3 June) ====
- Musical guests:
  - Dani Fernández ("Todo cambia")
  - Pol Granch ("Gigante")

Act	Order	Song	Result
Regular performances
Aye Alfonso	1	"Se fue"	Safe
Patrick Bel	2	"Manos de tijera"	Safe
Mix Band	3	"Mi Mala"	Bottom three
Coral Vicenti	4	"Pero Me Acuerdo de Ti"	Safe
Awy	5	"Una foto en blanco y negro"	Safe
Teete	6	"Cruje la cama"	Safe
Samuel Nagati	7	"Saoko"	Bottom three
J Prince	8	"Si tus piernas"	Immediately eliminated
Jürgen	9	"La Tortura"	Safe
Lucía Moreno	10	"Sweet Dreams (Are Made of This)"	Safe
Sing-off
Samuel Nagati	1	"Tuyo"	Saved
Mix Band	2	"Akureyri"	Eliminated

Judges' vote to eliminate

- Vanesa: Mix Band (believed Samuel to have more career potential)
- Abraham: Mix Band
- Willy: Samuel Nagati
- Lali: Mix Band (both acts were from her team; she stated she was voting with her heart)

==== Final (10 June) ====
- Group performances:
  - "He sido" / "El nudo" (Vanesa Martín and her team)
  - "Disciplina" (Lali and her team)

Act	Order	Song	Result
First round
Samuel Nagati	1	"Judas"	Eliminated
Coral Vicenti	2	"Procuro Olvidarte"	Safe
Awy	3	"Como si fueras a morir mañana"	Eliminated
Teete	4	"Te elijo a ti" (original song)	Safe
Patrick Bel	5	"Sin miedo a nada"	Safe
Jürgen	6	"Material Girl"	Eliminated
Aye Alfonso	7	"Si nos dejan"	Safe
Lucía Moreno	8	"Palabra prohibida"	Eliminated
Second round
Patrick Bel	1	"Historia de un Amor"	4th place
Aye Alfonso	2	"Creo en mí"	Winner
Coral Vicenti	3	"If I Ain't Got You"	3rd place
Teete	4	"Suéltate el pelo"	Runner-up

=== Ratings ===
Factor X consolidated viewership and adjusted position Colour key: – Highest rating during the season (nominal) – Lowest rating during the season (nominal)
Episode	Original airdate	Timeslot	Viewers (millions)	Share	Night Rank	Source
"Auditions - Part 1"	17 April 2024	Wednesday 10:50 pm	0.66	8.3%	#2	
"Auditions - Part 2"	23 April 2024	Tuesday 10:50 pm	0.54	7.7%	#3	
"Auditions - Part 3"	30 April 2024	Tuesday 10:50 pm	0.50	6.6%	#4	
"Auditions - Part 4"	6 May 2024	Monday 10:50 pm	0.44	6.6%	#6	
"Auditions - Part 5"	13 May 2024	Monday 10:50 pm	0.46	6.9%	#4	
"Chair Challenge"	20 May 2024	Monday 10:50 pm	0.38	5.7%	#5	
"Live Show 1 - First Semi Final"	27 May 2024	Monday 10:50 pm	0.39	5.7%	#6	
"Live Show 2 - Second Semi Final"	3 June 2024	Monday 10:50 pm	0.34	5.0%	#5	
"Live Show 3 - Final"	10 June 2024	Monday 10:50 pm	0.39	5.5%	#5	

== Post Factor X ==
A few weeks after the first season ended, eventual winner María Villalon released a debut EP entitled María Villalon, an album with all the songs she sang whilst in the competition. A few months later, she released her debut album Te Espero Aquí, which made the Spanish top 40 album chart, just like her debut LP did. But she wasn't the only one who received a record deal, runner-up Angy released her debut self-titled album a couple of weeks after Villalon's debut album release. She also began an acting career starring in the teen drama television series Física y Química, aired on Antena 3. 3rd placed Walter released a single, but it didn't see much success. Angy's debut single 'Sola En El Silencio' was a major hit across Spain, making the top 20 in Spanish Los 40 Principales. In turn, Maria Villalon's first two singles 'Aguita De Abril' and 'Te Espero Aqui' failed to gain chart stardom, but her second album saw the success of its lead single 'La lluvia' which made it into the top 5 in Los 40 Principales.

Months after the contest finished, 6th placed Leire Martínez's popularity boosted as she was chosen to replace Amaia Montero as the new lead singer of La Oreja de Van Gogh, one of the best-selling pop bands in Spain and Latin America. Her first album with the band, A las cinco en el Astoria, was released on 2 September 2008 reaching the number-one spot in the Spanish charts.

8th placed Ailyn submitted a song to Salvemos Eurovisión, the Spanish selection for the 2008 Eurovision Song Contest, but failed to get to the final round. Later that year, she was chosen to be the new female vocalist of the Norwegian Gothic Metal band Sirenia, working with them until 2016.

After the third season ended, judge Laura Pausini invited some of the contestants, including her pupils Samuel Hernández and series winner Pol Granch, to serve as opening acts for her upcoming world tour.
