= Alejandro de Pinedo =

Spanish musician (born 1965)

Alejandro De Pinedo
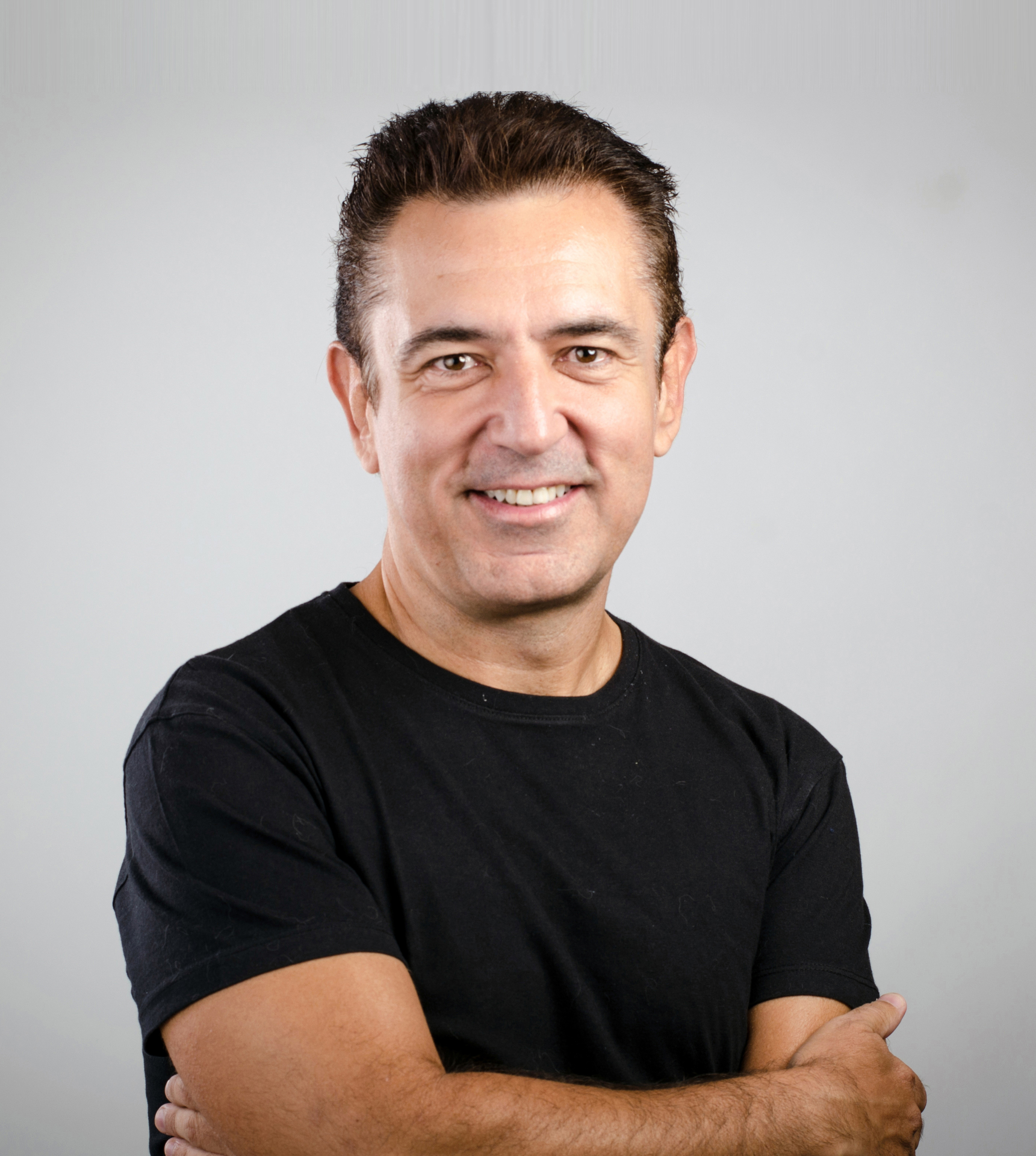

Background information
- Born: Alejandro Gil Pinedo; 21 March 1965 (age 61); Cádiz, Spain
- Origin: Jerez de la Frontera, Andalusia, Spain
- Genres: pop music, electronica, chill-out
- Occupations: Musician, music producer, songwriter, music executive
- Label: AGP Music
- Website: alejandrodepinedo.com

Alejandro Gil Pinedo (born 21 March 1965), better known as Alejandro de Pinedo, is a Spanish musician, composer, author and record producer. His work spans genres such as pop, EDM and chill-out music, and he has received 31 gold and platinum records. De Pinedo has contributed to over 250 musical productions and his music has been streamed millions of times on digital platforms worldwide.

== Life and career ==
De Pinedo was born in Cádiz and raised in Jerez de la Frontera. As a teenager, he was a member of the progressive rock band Triunvirato. He later moved to Madrid, where he earned a degree in telecommunications engineering.

He began his career as a session guitarist, touring internationally in the late 1980s with Latin artists including Raphael, Georgie Dann, María del Monte, and El Fary. In 1995, he founded the record label and publishing company AGP Music.

In 2004, De Pinedo launched his solo career in the chill-out genre, producing music for the Café del Mar label and gaining international recognition within the ambient music scene.

As a producer, composer, and arranger, he has collaborated with numerous prominent artists such as Enrique Iglesias, Rosa López, Raphael, Daniel Diges, Georgie Dann, Pitingo, Café del Mar, Vicky Larraz, Olé-Olé, Cristina Ramos, Maria Villalón, Soraya Arnelas, Paloma San Basilio, Falete, Sada Vidoo, Roko, Enrique Ramil, La Década Prodigiosa, Modestia Aparte, Raúl, etc.

Since 2024, he has served as the musical director of the television program Bailando con las Estrellas, the Spanish version of Dancing with the Stars, broadcast on Tele5.

== Chill-out discography ==
- Sun (2025, AGP Music)
- Paradise On Earth (2024, AGP Music)
- The Seven Deadly Sins (2021, AGP Music)
- Zodiac (2020, AGP Music)
- Chill-Out Songs (2017, AGP Music)
- Mystic Ibiza (2014, AGP Music)
- Andalucía Flamenco Chill, vol.2 (2013, Publimáster Discos)
- Beatlounge Chillout Lifestyle (2012, Beatlounge Music)
- Bailando con la luna (2012, República Café)
- Café del Mar Vol 17 (2011, Café del Mar Music)
- Café del Mar 30 Years of Music (2010, Café del Mar Music)
- Collection, The Bests Songs of Ibiza's Sunset (2010, República Café – Coco Entertainment Records)
- Cafe del 30 Anniversary (2010, República Café – Coco Entertainment Records)
- Jerez Flamenco-Chill Vol 1 (2010, 12 Doce Records)
- Café del Mar Vol 16 (2009, Café del Mar Music)
- Diamond and Pearls Lounge (2008, Tyranno Lounge Records)
- Café del Mar Vol 15 (2008, Café del Mar Music)
- Café del Mar Vol 14 (2007, Café del Mar Music)
- Café del Mar Vol 13 (2006, Café del Mar Music)
- Café del Mar Dreams 4 (2006, Café del Mar Music)
- Café del Mar Vol 12 (2005, Café del Mar Music)
- Café del Mar 25 Anniversary (2004, Café del Mar Music)

== Awards ==
- Finalist Premios de la Música 2006, Best Electronic Music song, "AQUARIUS" (Café del Mar Music)
- Radio National Award 2011, Best advertising campaign 2011: “EL Veranito”, for Georgie Dann
- Six Platinum Discs for his participation in the German promotional disc Saunsand, Jil Sander (Café del Mar Music, 2007)
- Three Platinum Discs for his participation in the compilation CAFE DEL MAR, VOLUMEN 12 (Café del Mar Music, 2005)
- Three Platinum Discs for his participation in the compilation IBIZA MIX 96 (Max Music, 1996)
- Two Platinum Discs for his participation in the compilation CAFE DEL MAR, VOLUMEN 13 (Café del Mar Music, 2006)
- Two Platinum Discs for his participation in the compilation CAFE DEL MAR, 25 ANIVERSARIO (Café del Mar Music, 2005)
- Platinum Disc for his participation in the compilation CAFE DEL MAR VOLUMEN 15 (Cafe del Mar Music, 2008)
- Platinum Disc for his participation in the compilation CAFE DEL MAR VOLUMEN 14 (Cafe del Mar Music, 2007)
- Platinum Disc for his participation in the compilation CARIBE MIX 2005&euro (Blano y Negro Music, 2005)
- Platinum Disc for his participation in the compilation IBIZA MIX 99 (Blanco y Negro, 1999)
- Platinum Disc for his participation in the compilation DISCO ESTRELLA (Vale Music, 1998)
- Platinum Disc for his participation in the compilation LOS 100 MAYORES EXITOS DE LOS 80, Vol1 (Arcade, 1997)
- Gold Disc for his album CHILL OUT SONGS, more than 8 million plays (AGP Music, 2017)
- Gold Disc for his participation in the compilation, DREAMS 4 (Café del Mar Music, 2006)
- Gold disc for its work of Mastering for the album GENERATION NEXT MUSIC (Arcade, 1998)
- Gold Disc for his participation in the compilation CALENTITO CALENTITO (Ginger Music, 1997)
- Gold disc for its work of Mastering for the album LOS 100 MAYORES EXITOS DE LA MUSICA DISCO (Arcade, 1996)
- Gold Disc for his participation in the compilation RUMBA TOTAL 3 (Max Music, 1996)
- Gold Disc for his participation in the compilation BOMBAZO MIX 2 (Max Music, 1996)
- Winner of XXXIV Festival Festival de Benidorm 2001, as author of the song MI RAZON DE VIVIR performed by Carlos Fénix
- Number 1 Spain Promusicae official chart for his participation in the compilation "OT 2018 EUROVISION" (Universal Music Spain, 2019)
- Number 1 Spain iTunes chart for his participation in the album ROSA LOPEZ (Universal Music Spain, 2012)
- Finalist in the San Marino selection of Eurovision Song Contest 2022 in the TV program "Una Voce Per San Marino", as author of the song "HEARTLESS GAME" performed by Cristina Ramos.
- Finalist in the Spanish selection of Eurovision Song Contest 2019 in the TV program "Operacion Triunfo", as author of the song "HOY SOÑARÉ" performed by Sabela Ramil.
- Finalist in the Spanish selection of Eurovision Song Contest 2011 in the TV program "Destino Eurovisión", as author of the song "EOS" performed by Melissa
- Finalist in the Spanish selection of Eurovision Song Contest 2010 in the TV program "Destino Oslo", as author of the song "AMOR MAGICO" performed by Lorena Gómez
- Finalist in the Spanish selection of Eurovision Song Contest 2009 in the TV program "Eurovision 2009 El Retorno", as author of the song "LUJURIA" performed by Salva Ortega
- Finalist in the Spanish selection of Eurovision Song Contest 2008 in the TV program "Salvemos Eurovisión", as author of the song "UN OLÉ" performed by Arkaitz
- Finalist in the Spanish selection of Eurovision Song Contest 2007 in the TV program "Misión Eurovisión", as author of the song "BUSCO UN HOMBRE"
- Finalist in the Spanish selection of Eurovision Song Contest 2005, as author of the song "SANTO JOB" performed by Gema castaño

== Music production and TV ==
- Musical Director Bailando con las estrellas (Tele5, 2024) Spanish version of Strictly Come Dancing and Dancing with the Stars
- Raúl - Me Muero Por Tus Besos (2024, AGP Music)
- Chalay - Reproches (2024, AGP Music)
- Raúl & Supremme de Luxe - Divinamente (2023, AGP Music)
- Ferrán Faba - Cita en el Metaverso (2023, AGP Music)
- Vicky Larraz & Ole'Star - Quiéreme Siempre (2022, AGP Music)
- Raúl - Aunque me Duela (2022, AGP Music)
- David Velardo - Eos (2022, AGP Music)
- Vicky Larraz & Ole'Star - Planeta 5000 (2022, AGP Music)
- Cristina Ramos - Heartless Game (2022, AGP Music)
- Vicky Larraz & Ole'Star - Que ha Pasado Entre Tu y Yo (2022, AGP Music)
- Raúl - Perdona Que Te Diga (2022, AGP Music)
- David Velardo - Sin Piedad (2021, AGP Music)
- Tanke Ruiz - Intimo (2021, AGP Music)
- Lydia Ruiz & Stephanie Amaro - Ay, Amiga (2021, AGP Music)
- Triunvirato (2021, AGP Music)
- Vicky Larraz & Ole'Star - Me lo he Quedao (2021, AGP Music)
- Cristina Ramos feat Soraya – La Isla Fantástica (2021, AGP Music)
- Cristina Ramos – Superstar (2021, Cristina Ramos)
- Enrike Lemus - Vi Llover (2020, AGP Music)
- Vicky Larraz & Ole'Star – A Fuego Lento (2020, Tele5)
- Sueños de Copla – El Lerele (2020, AGP Music)
- Sentimiento – Báilalo (2020, AGP Music)
- Vicky Larraz & Ole'Star – Imaginando (2020, AGP Music)
- Vicky Larraz & Ole'Star – Lilí Bailando Sóla (2019, AGP Music)
- Vicky Larraz & Ole'Star – Mil Controles (2019, AGP Music)
- Vicky Larraz & Ole'Star – Soldados del Amor (2019, AGP Music)
- Vicky Larraz & Ole'Star – No Controles (2019, AGP Music)
- Ole'Star – Seré Luz (2019, AGP Music)
- Ole'Star – Dress You Up (2019, AGP Music)
- Ole'Star – Sólo Promesas (2019, AGP Music)
- OT 2018 Eurovisión – Hoy Soñaré, Sabela (2019, Universal Music Spain)
- Camerino 401 – Lo Digo (2019, AGP Music)
- Olestar – Regala (2018, AGP Music)
- Camerino 401 – Por Ti (2018, AGP Music)
- Mael – Wild Eyes (2018, AGP Music)
- Ole Ole – Hoy Quiero Confesar (2018, AGP Music)
- Camerino 401 – Hasta que Salga el Sol (2018, AGP Music)
- La Década Prodigiosa – Enjoy la Fiesta (2018, AGP Music)
- Mael – Telephone (2017, AGP Music)
- Karla Girigay – Te Veo (2017, AGP Music)
- Georgie Dann – Que Viva el Vino (2017, AGP Music)
- Chus Cintas – Chus Cintas (2017, AGP Music)
- Greg – Rainbow (2017, AGP Music)
- Olé Olé – 2.0 (2017, AGP Music)
- Fran Triguero – Fran Triguero (2017, AGP Music)
- Padro Bautista – Mi Delaración (2017, AGP Music)
- Kiko Barriuso – Kiko Barriuso (2017, AGP Music)
- Olé-Olé – En Control (2117, Ramalama Music)
- Alejandro de Pinedo - ChillOut Songs (2017, AGP Music)
- Olé-Olé – Sin Control (2016, Ramalama Music)
- Maria Sanz – Celosa (2016, AGP Music)
- Maria Sanz – Plan B (2016, AGP Music)
- Gaby Rope – Palabras al Viento (2016, AGP Music)
- Kafé pa 3 – Kilómetros de Sueños (2016, Lets Events)
- Pedro Bautista – A Tiempo (2016, AGP Music)
- E-Twins – Trastornado (2016, AGP Music)
- Move Team – Move Team (2016, AGP Music)
- David Velardo – Si Tu no Estás Aqui (2015, AGP Music)
- Pepa Chamberí – Cruzar el Charco (2015, AGP Music)
- Caramelo – Un Nuevo Rumbo (2015, AGP Music)
- Chaíto y Palosanto – Basta Ya (2015, AGP Music)
- Karla Girigay – Vuelve a Empezar (2015, AGP Music)
- Alejandro de Pinedo – Mystic Ibiza (2014, AGP Music)
- Kafé pa 3 – Ohú Que Caló (2014, AGP Music)
- Alejandro Udó – Mil Veces Te Quiero (2014, AGP Music)
- Roberto y Ana – El Súper Disco Chino (2014, Warner Music)
- Georgie Dann – La Cerveza (2013, Poney Musical)
- Kafé pa 3 – Kafeteando (2013, AGP Music)
- Daniel Diges – Hoy Tengo Ganas de Ti (2013, Warner Music)
- Alejandro de Pinedo – Hotel Utopía – Andalucía Flamenco Chill Vol 2 (2013, Publimáster)
- José Vaquero – Come Back to Me (2013, AGP Music)
- Salva Ortega – Solos Tu y Yo (2012, mcyd)
- Alejandro de Pinedo – Gemini – Beatlounge ChillOut Lifestyle (2012, Beatlounge Music)
- Rosa López – Rosa López (2012, Universal Music Spain)
- Daniel Diges – Dónde Estabas tu en los 70's (2012, Warner Music)
- Alejandro de Pinedo – Bailando con la Luna (2012, República Café)
- Miguel Saeda – Mifuel Saeda (2012, AGP Music)
- Voodoo – Around The World (2011, Voodoo Music)
- Spinosa – Numen (2011, Spinosa)
- Alejandro de Pinedo – Raindrops – Café del Mar Vol 17 – (2011, Café del Mar Music)
- Melissa – Eos (2011, AGP Music)
- María López – Eos (2011, AGP Music)
- La Dama y los Vagabundos – Lo Que Cuentan en los Bares (2011, Laloli Records)
- Alejandro de Pinedo – Sex on The Beach – Beachland (2011, Blanco y Negro Music)
- Georgie Dann – El Veranito (2011, Poney Musical)
- Daniel Diges – Algo Pequeñito (2010, Warner Music)
- AGP Band – Bailando con la Luna – Café del Mar 30 Years of Music (2010 Café del Mar Music)
- Alejandro de Pinedo – Sax 4 Sex – The Best Songs of Ibiza's Sunset (2010 República Café)
- Alejandro de Pinedo – Capricorn – The Best Songs of Ibiza's Sunset (2010 República Café)
- Alejandro de Pinedo – Golden Sunset – Café del 30 Anniversary – (2010 República Café)
- Oberón – Imsomnio de una Noche de Verano – (2010, Bobamusic)
- Alejandro de Pinedo – Floating Dance – Jerez Flamenco Chill (2010, Doce12 Compañía Musical)
- Manuel de Segura – Su Majestad la Copla (2010 AGP Music)
- Samuel & Patricia – Don't let me go (2010, Samuel y Patricia)
- Alfredo Leonardo – Ahora Si (2010, Alfredo Leonardo Music)
- Daniel Diges – Algo Pequeñito – Eurovisión Song Contest Oslo (2010, CMC/EMI)
- Alejandro de Pinedo – Hotel Utopía – Café del Mar Vol 16 (2009, Café del Mar Music)
- Gabriela Ayala – Libertad de Corazón (2009, World Magic Record Music)
- Arcano – Rompiendo Cadenas (2009, Fco Javier Alonso Torres Music)
- La Red de San Luis – Madre Tierra (2009, El Séptimo Sello)
- Shivaritas – Madre Tierra (2009, Shivaritas)
- Salva Ortega – Lujuria – Barca Triplet (2009, Avispa Music)
- Castilla La Mancha Busca una estrella (2009, TVCLM)
- Madrid Superstar (2008, TeleMadrid)
- Alfredo Leonardo – Ya Vengo (2008, Alfredo Leonardo)
- Alejandro de Pinedo – Sax 4 Sex – Café del Mar Vol 15 (2008, Café del Mar Music)
- Arkaitz – Un Olé – Salvemos Eurovisión (2008, Universal Music)
- Icaro Caído – Icaro Caído (2008, Manuel Martínez Frutos)
- Flax – Sólo (2008, Flax Discos, Lolipop)
- La Red de San Luis – Romántico Latino (2008, El Séptimo Sello)
- Oberón – Meridiano Cero (2008, Bobamusic)
- Lolo Herrero – Secretos de mi Jardín Prohibido (2008, Bobamusic)
- Alejandro de Pinedo – Gemini – Diamonds & Pearls (2008, Tyranno Lounge Records)
- Alejandro de Pinedo – Wonderland – Café del Mar Vol 14 (2007, Café del Mar Music)
- D'Nash – Busco una Chica (2007, Record Caes)
- Alejandro de Pinedo – Cancer – Sun Sand Jil Sander (2007, Café del Mar Music)
- Georgie Dann – El Rey del Verano (2007, Poney Musical)
- Alejandro de Pinedo – Cancer – Café del Mar Vol 14 (2006, Café del Mar Music)
- Tenesoya – Perdamos el Control – Caribe Mix 2006 (2006, Blanco & Negro)
- Alejandro de Pinedo – Capricorn – Café del Mar Vol 13 (2006, Café del Mar Music)
- Alejandro de Pinedo – Aquarius – Café del Mar Vol 12 (2005, Café del Mar Music)
- Tenesoya – Bienvenidos a mi Fiesta – Caribe Mix 2005 (2005, Blanco y Negro Music)
- Alejandro de Pinedo – Sex on the Beach – Café del Mar 25 Anniversary (2005, Café del Mar Music)
- Georgie Dann – De Vuelta (2004, Filmax)
- Alvaro Prado – Maldito (2004, Vale Music)
- Alea – Trece (2004, Alea Music)
- Salao – Salao (2003, Avispa Music)
- Georgie Dann – Vamos a la Pista (2003, Filmax)
- Manuel de Segura – Alegrías de España (2003, AGP Music)
- Georgie Dann – Vamos a la Pista – Disco Sorpresa (2003, Filmax)
- Coral – Coral (2002, Sony Music)
- Solo2 – Esclavos del Amor (2002, Muxxic)
- Georgie Dann – Grandes Éxitos (2002, Sony Music)
- Carlos Fénix – Fénix (2001, EMI)
- Juan Valdés & Co. – La Quiniela (2000, Arcade Music)
- Juan Valdés & Co. – El Baile del Marciano – Ibiza Mix 99 (1999, Blanco & Negro)
- Juan Valdés & Co. – El Sucu-Sucu – Calentito, Calentito 2 (1997, Ginger Music)
- Los Pepe's – Como Una Moto Voy – Bombazo Mix 2 (1996, Vale Music)
- Los Pepe's – Como Una Moto Voy – Rumba Total 3 (1996, Vale Music)
- Los Pepe's – Los Pepe's (1996, Vale Music)
- Los Pepe's – Como Una Moto Voy – Ibiza Mix 96 (1996, Vale Music)
