= Eva Perales =

Spanish TV personality (born 1973)

Eva Perales (born 1973) is a Spanish TV personality. She is a music manager and headhunter, and also organises many live festivals and musical events, both in Spain and overseas. In 2007 and 2008, she was a judge on Factor X, the Spanish version of The X Factor. In 2011, she was also a judge on the eighth season of Operación Triunfo.
