= Georgie Dann =

French singer (1940–2021)

- Born: Georges Mayer Dahan; 14 January 1940; Paris, France
- Died: 3 November 2021 (aged 81) Majadahonda, Spain
- Occupations: Musician, singer-songwriter
- Years active: 1960s–2018
- Spouse: Emilia García Emy (1974–2021; his death)

Georges Mayer Dahan (14 January 1940 – 3 November 2021), performing as Georgie Dann, was a Spain-based French singer-songwriter, known for his popular summer hits.

== Career ==
=== Early life ===
Georges Mayer Dahan was born on 14 January 1940 in Paris, to an orchestral clarinettist father. He studied eight years at the Conservatoire de Paris and excelled as a saxophonist. At the same time, he studied education. In 1964, he travelled to Spain to represent his country at the Festival de la Canción Mediterránea, where he performed "Tout ce que tu sais".

=== Summer hits ===
Dann established his career in Spain, focusing on summer hits. His first hit was "El casatschok" (1969), Dann subsequently enjoyed great success in the 1970s and 1980s with songs with catchy, danceable choruses and sometimes racy lyrics, such as "El Bimbó", "Macumba", "Carnaval, carnaval", "El africano", "El chiringuito", "La barbacoa", "El Koumbo", "La paloma blanca", "Cuando suena el acordeón","El Beaner", "Coctel tropical", "El dinosaurio", "Mi cafetal", "La cerveza", "El negro no puede". The first music video clips broadcast on Televisión Española corresponded to songs composed by him. Those were years in which he visited many television programs and his fame spread in Latin American countries, a fame that began to be eclipsed by artists such as Ricky Martín, Los del Río, Chayanne in the 1990s.

The year 1988 was the beginning of a second stage of success, he was named marked by the summer hit "El chiringuito", which achieved millionaire sales. He stepped aside for a few years, until 1993, with songs like "Manolo tiene una cosa" and in 1994 he released another big hit, "La barbacoa". The following years were of intense activity in several television galas and released songs such as "Vamos a la pista" (2003), "Dale dale" (2004) and "Mecagüentó" (2007), "La gallina cha-cha-cha" (2010), "El veranito" (2011), among others. Another group (La Banda del Capitán Canalla) decided to pay homage to him with their song "Que vuelva ya Georgie Dann" in 2003.

In an interview in 2012, at a late stage in his music career, he said that he had not worked for the month of August for the first time, because the economic crisis had affected the celebration of local festivals, forcing the only three galas for which he had rehearsed to be cancelled. His last hit was in 2018, with the song "Buen rollinski", an attempt at a summer anthem during the FIFA World Cup in Russia that year.

== Style ==
Georgie Dann's musical style was mostly accelerated tropical rhythms. His lyrics, in a humorous tone, related everyday situations of the Spanish summer, as well as catchy refrains.

== Personal life ==
During the last years of his life, Dann lived in Madrid. In 1974, he married Spaniard Emilia García Emy, one of his dancers, with whom he had three children; two, Patricia and Paúl, formed the duo "Calle París".

Dann died on 3 November 2021 at the Puerta de Hierro Hospital in Majadahonda, Madrid, during a hip operation.

== Georgie Dann's summer hits ==
- 1969 "Casatschok"
- 1974 "La rana"
- 1975 "El Bimbó"
- 1975 "El campesino"
- 1975 "Paloma blanca"
- 1977 "Mi cafetal"
- 1977 "Eres como una paloma"
- 1980 "Moscou"
- 1980 "El jardín de Alá"
- 1982 "Koumbó"
- 1983 "Carnaval, carnaval"
- 1985 "El africano"
- 1986 "Macumba"
- 1987 "El negro no puede"
- 1988 "El chiringuito"
- 1994 "La Barbacoa"
- 2003 "Vamos a la Pista"
- 2004 "Dale-Dale"
- 2007 "Mecagüentó"
- 2013 "La cerveza"
- 2017 "Viva el vino"
- 2018 "Buen rollinski"

== Other songs ==
- 1970 "Santiago"
- 1972 "El dinosaurio"
- 2010 "La gallina cha-cha-cha"
- 2011 "El veranito"
- 2012 "A viajar"
