= Diana Navarro =

Spanish singer

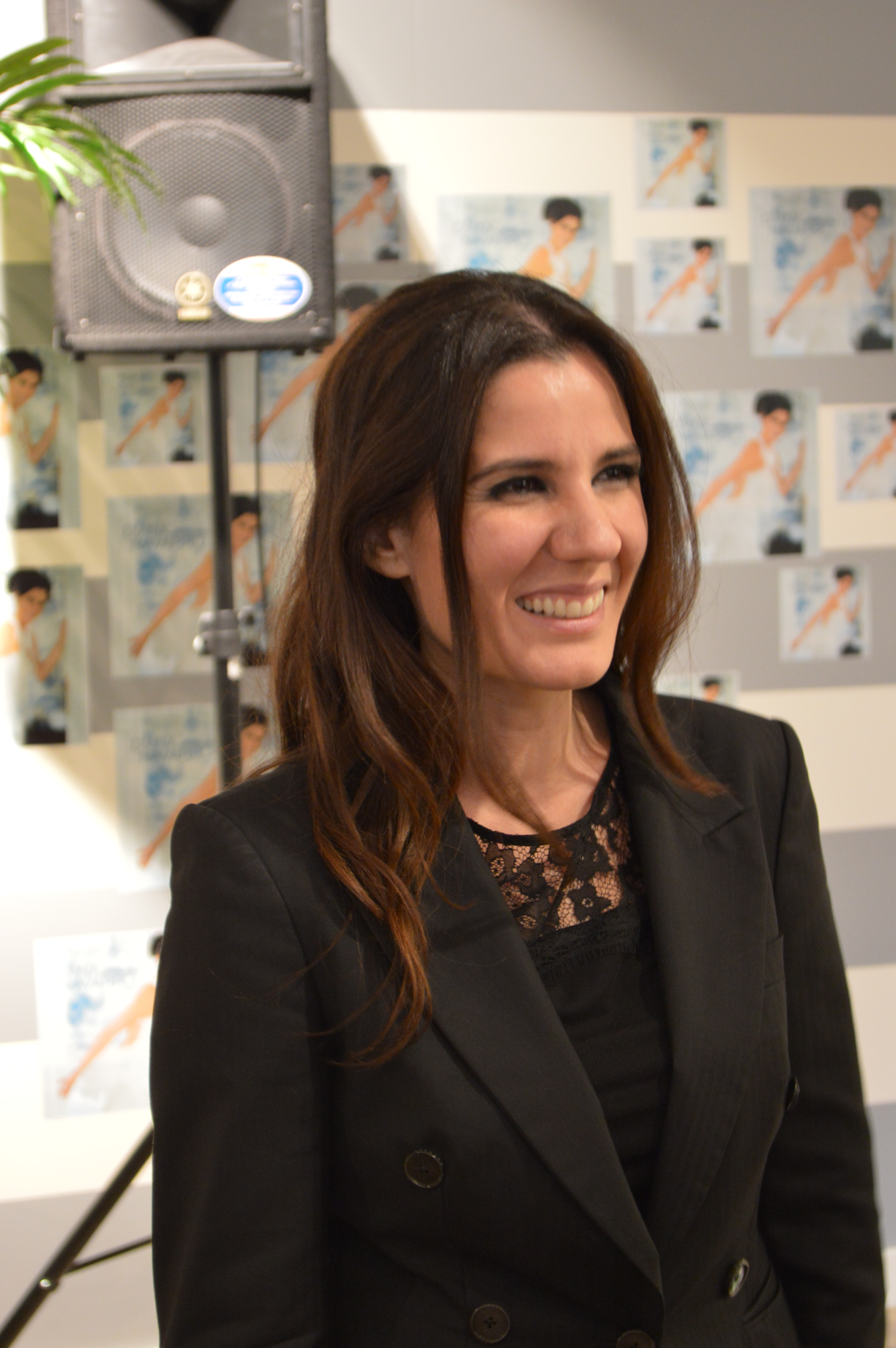
- Born: Diana Navarro Ocaña; 21 April 1978 (age 47); Málaga, Spain
- Occupation: Singer
- Website: diananavarro.es

Diana Navarro Ocaña (born 21 April 1978 in Málaga) is a Spanish singer. She rose to fame in 2005 with the single "Sola" from her first album No te olvides de mí. She was nominated for a Latin Grammy as Best New Artist in 2005. Her songs usually mix genres like copla and flamenco with different rhythms like Arabic or classical music.

== Discography ==
- No te olvides de mí (2005)
- 24 rosas (2007)
- Camino verde (2008)
- Flamenco (2011)
- Género chica (2012)
- La esencia (2013, compilation album)
- Resiliencia (2016)
- Coplas de Zarzuela (2018, live album)
- Inesperado (2019)
- De la Piquer a la Navarro (2023)
