= Maria do Ceo =

Portuguese poet, writer and playwright

Maria do Ceo (1658–1753), was a Portuguese poet, writer, and playwright. She went by the pseudonyms of Marina Clemencia, Sister Maria do Cêu, Sor Maria do Ceo del Cielo and Maria del Cielo. (11 September 1658 – 28 May 1753). Born in Lisbon, Portugal. Her work was written during the Baroque era, which is the period of artistic style that uses exaggerated motion and clear interpreted detail to produce work. This period started around 1600 and quickly spread throughout Europe. She has been compared to the prominent authors from the Iberian peninsulas including Giambattista Marino, a Neapolitan Poet, and another writer and nun Juana Inés de la Cruz. Comparatively Juana was a self-taught scholar and poet of the Baroque school. Her reasoning for becoming a nun was so she could continued her studies more freely.

== Personal life ==
Maria was born in Lisbon, Portugal, the daughter of nobility to António de Eça de Castro and Catarina de Távora. Her Sisters were Francisca Benta de Távora and Isabel de Silva, both sisters’ married high-ranking military officials. Like Maria, Isabel was a poet, the author of such works like Comédia de Santa Iria, Estrela Errante, Noites de Sol or Obras de Misericórdia. At the age of eighteen, Maria entered the Franciscan convent of Nossa Senhora de Piedade de Esperança in Lisbon, in June 1676. Maria served many roles while in the convent. These roles included the function of porter, mistress of novices, and twice as office of prioress.

== Literary work ==
In service, the Sister Maria do Céu reflected and used all the basic tendencies of literary-aesthetic in baroque. The Lisbon literary writer includes both religious compositions and works of secular character in the novel allegorical poems and collections of poem and parables. In 1681, Maria do Ceo wrote the first novel allegorical Escarmentos de flores, while the original English version, officially the next track this type of A Preciosa was established in 1690. Later works were printed in Lisbon under the religious name ( Maria do Ceo) or pseudonym (Marina Clemencia) author. In the 1740s, two volumes of her works were published in Madrid, where she had become quite popular. For the most outstanding work by Maria do Ceo recognized by modern literary historians, include A Preciosa. This work was written in prose and verse, a two part allegorical novel issued with a manuscript in the early 1690s. Some motifs from A Preciosa include the books of the Bible, as well as Greek and Roman mythology, the novel also has references to classical philosophy and scholastic, romantic court, and novel pastoral. For the nuns the allegorical song Aves Ilustradas, which is a collection of examples constructed from the avian debate. This work is considered one of the best examples of Portuguese literature and fairy tales with animals included in its didactic function. Maria do Ceo started signing as Sor Maria del Cielo due to her key personalities associated with the royal court, including Teresa de Moncada u Beanavides, Duchess of Medinaceli and her daughter.

== Works ==
- A Feniz Aparecida on vida, morte, sepulture, & Milagres de gloriosa S. Catharin, rainha de Alexandria, Virgem & martyr. Lisboa: Offician Real Deslandesian, 1715
- Rozario dos attributos divinos. Lisboa: Officina Joaquinanna da Musica, 1730s
- A preciosa. Allegoria moral. Lisboa: D Jamie de La Té e Sagau, 1731.
- A preciosa. Obras de Misericordia I primorosos that mysticos dialogos expostas. Lisboa Occidental: Officina da Muscia, 1733.
- Aves ilustrada I avisos para server as Religiosas os seus officios dos Mosteiros, Lisboa Offician Miguel Rodrigues, 1734; ed. II 0 Lisboa: Officina Miguel Rodrigues, 1738
- Obras varias e admiraveis give MR Madre Maria do Ceo. Lisboa Occidental, Officina de Manoel da Costa Fernandes, 1735
- Engoñosa to the bosque, dezenganos to Rio, Lisboa: Officina de Manoel Fernandes da Costa, 1736; ed. II Lisbon: Officina de Lisboa António da Fonseca, 1741
- Trifuno to Rosario repartido I sinco autos mesmo muito devotos that Divertidos, pelas Singularian ideas, com que os compoz a muito Reverend Madre Maria, Lisboa Occidental: Officina de Manescal Miguel da Costa, 1740
- Obras y varias de la Madre Maria do Ceo, religiosa y francisca Abadesa del convent de la Esperança de Lisboa. Corregidas de los muchos defectos de la Edición portuguesa, é ilustradas con breves notas por el Doct. Fernando Setien Calderon de la Barca, Madrid: Antonio Marin, 1744 (two volumes)
- Meraforas das flores pela MR Madre Maria do Ceo, Lisboa: Typographia da rua dos Retrozeiros, 1873
- A Preciosa de Soror Maria do Céu. Ediçāo actulizada to Códice 3733 da Biblioteca Nacinal de um precedida estudo histórico, Lisboa: Instituo Nacional de Investigaçāo Cientifica, 1990
- Triunfo do Rosário repartido I cincos autos, Lisboa: Quimera, 1992
- Rellaçāo da vida e morte da Serva Deos and veneravel Madre Elenna da Crus see Soror Maria do Céu. Transciçāo to Códice 87 can Bibloteca Nacional de um precedida estudo historico, Lisboa: Quimera, 1993
