= María Villalón =

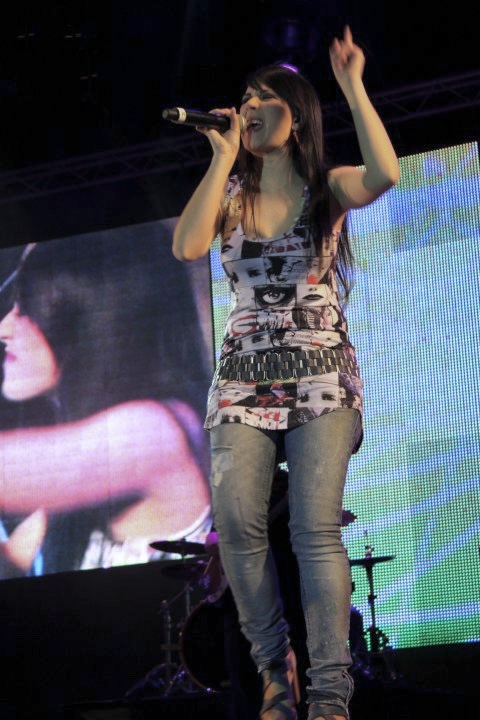
- María Villalón singing at Primavera Pop 2010 in Barcelona.
- Born: María Villalón Sánchez; April 1, 1989 (age 37); Ronda, Málaga, Spain
- Education: Complutense University of Madrid
- Occupations: Singer; songwriter
- Years active: 2000–present
- Musical career
- Genres: Pop
- Instruments: Vocals; Cello

María Villalón Sánchez (born 1 April 1989 in Ronda, Málaga, Spain), is a Spanish singer and most notably the winner of the first series of the Spanish version of The X Factor in 2007.

== Biography ==
Villalón grew up singing from an early age. She attended a music conservatory, learning to play cello when she was 10. She published two studio albums with a small Andalusian record label. In 2006, Villalón took part in the television show Bienvenidos on Canal Sur, and she auditioned for the reality television music competition Operación Triunfo, reaching the top 90 of candidates, but she was not selected.

== Factor X ==
In 2007, at age 17, Villalón rose to fame when she auditioned for the reality show music competition Factor X, the Spanish version of The X Factor, aired on Cuatro. She went on to win the series, performing the Dulce Pontes cover version of "Canção do Mar" and the Pasión Vega hit "María Se Bebe las Calles".

== After Factor X ==
On 13 November 2007, after her win, Villalón released her first studio album, Te espero aquí (2007), with Sony BMG. Its first and only single was "Agüita de abril".

In 2009, Villalón's second album, Los tejados donde fuimos más que amigos (2009), gave her another Top 40 single, titled La lluvia.

Villalón spent some time living in Scotland and retiring from music.

In 2018, Villalón re-emerged, coming back to prominence as one of the participants of the seventh season of the reality series Tu cara me suena, where celebrity contestants impersonate singers. On 8 February 2019, she was declared the winner of the season.

== Discography ==
=== Albums ===
- 2000: Entre sueños
- 2002: Rompe
- 2007: Las mejores canciones de María en Factor X
- 2008: Te espero aquí
- 2009: Los tejados donde fuimos más que amigos
- 2012: Historias de una cantonta
- 2015: El insólito viaje de una gota de lluvia

=== EP's ===
- 2022: Tratado de Paz

=== Singles ===
- 2007: "Agüita de abril"
- 2008: "Amores que matan"
- 2009: "La lluvia"
- 2010: "Cosas que no sé de ti"
- 2010: "Quiero que estés aquí"
- 2012: "La ciudad de las bicicletas"
- 2013: "Todo arde"
- 2014: "Dieta para dos"
- 2014: "Descalza"
- 2015: "Ni tú ni yo"
- 2016: "Mágico y absurdo"
- 2018: "La batalla"
- 2021: "Pañuelos de seda"
- 2022: "Despierta, corazón"
- 2022: "Tratado de paz"

Preceded by None	Factor X (Spain); Winner; 2007	Succeeded by Vocal Tempo
