= Got Talent España season 5 =

2019 Spanish television series

Got Talent España
- Season 5
- Presented by: Santi Millán
- Judges: Risto Mejide; Edurne; Dani Martínez; Paz Padilla
- Winner: Hugo Molina
- Runner-up: MagoDeLucasss

Release
- Original network: Telecinco
- Original release: 16 September – 16 December 2019

Season chronology
- Next → Season 6

The fifth season of the television program Got Talent España aired on Telecinco from September 16, 2019, to December 16, 2019. The show was hosted, once again, by Santi Millán and produced by Fremantle. Paz Padilla, Edurne, and Risto Mejide all returned to the judging panel, however after the exit of Eva Isanta at the end of Season 4, Dani Martínez was brought in as her replacement, and immediately became very popular with audiences. The winner of the fifth season was drummer Hugo Molina, the youngest winner in Got Talent history at just 3 years old. Magician, 'MagoDeLucasss' (A.K.A Bryan de Lucas) was declared runner-up. The fifth season achieved an average audience of 2,345,000 viewers and a 21.7% audience share.

== Format ==
Each judge has the power to press a red buzzer in front of them if they dislike a performance, with four buzzers stopping the act immediately. The Golden Buzzer, a well known and very popular staple by this point, returned, allowing each judge and the host to send one act straight to the live semi-finals. In the semi-finals, acts perform live for the public vote, with the judges offering critiques. A collective Golden Buzzer is available during these rounds, allowing the judges to unanimously send one standout act straight to the Grand Final. The winner is ultimately decided by the public vote in the grand final, securing not only the title of Spain’s most talented act but also a cash prize and national recognition.

Judges and Presenter for Got Talent España Season 5

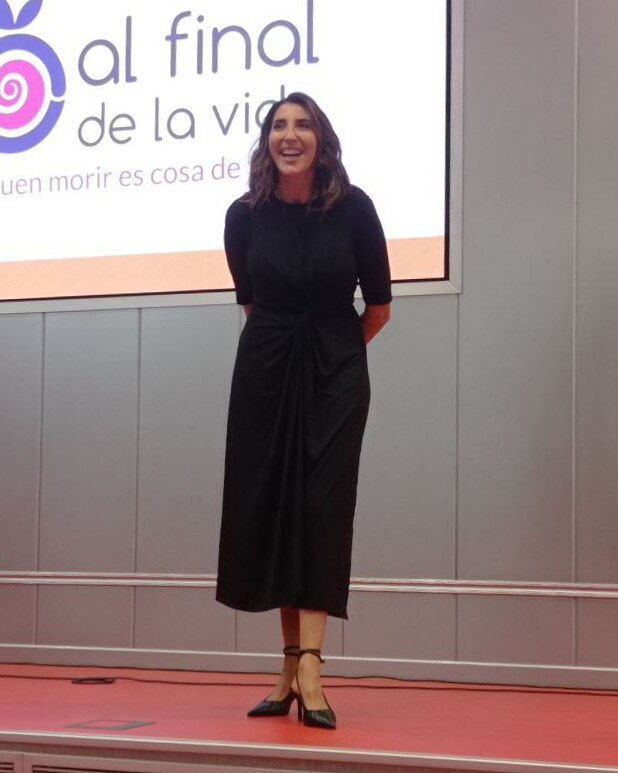
Paz Padilla

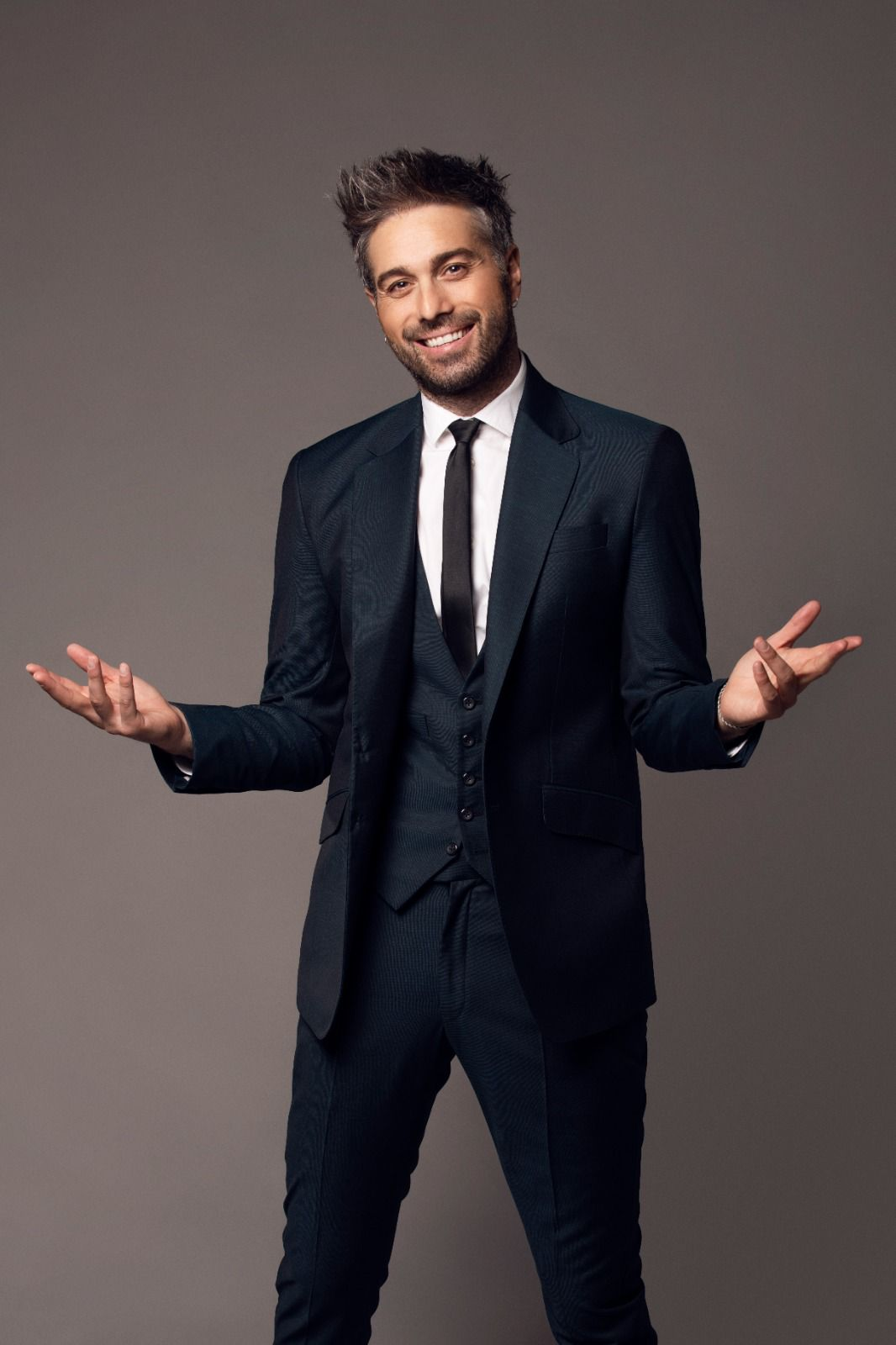
Dani Martínez

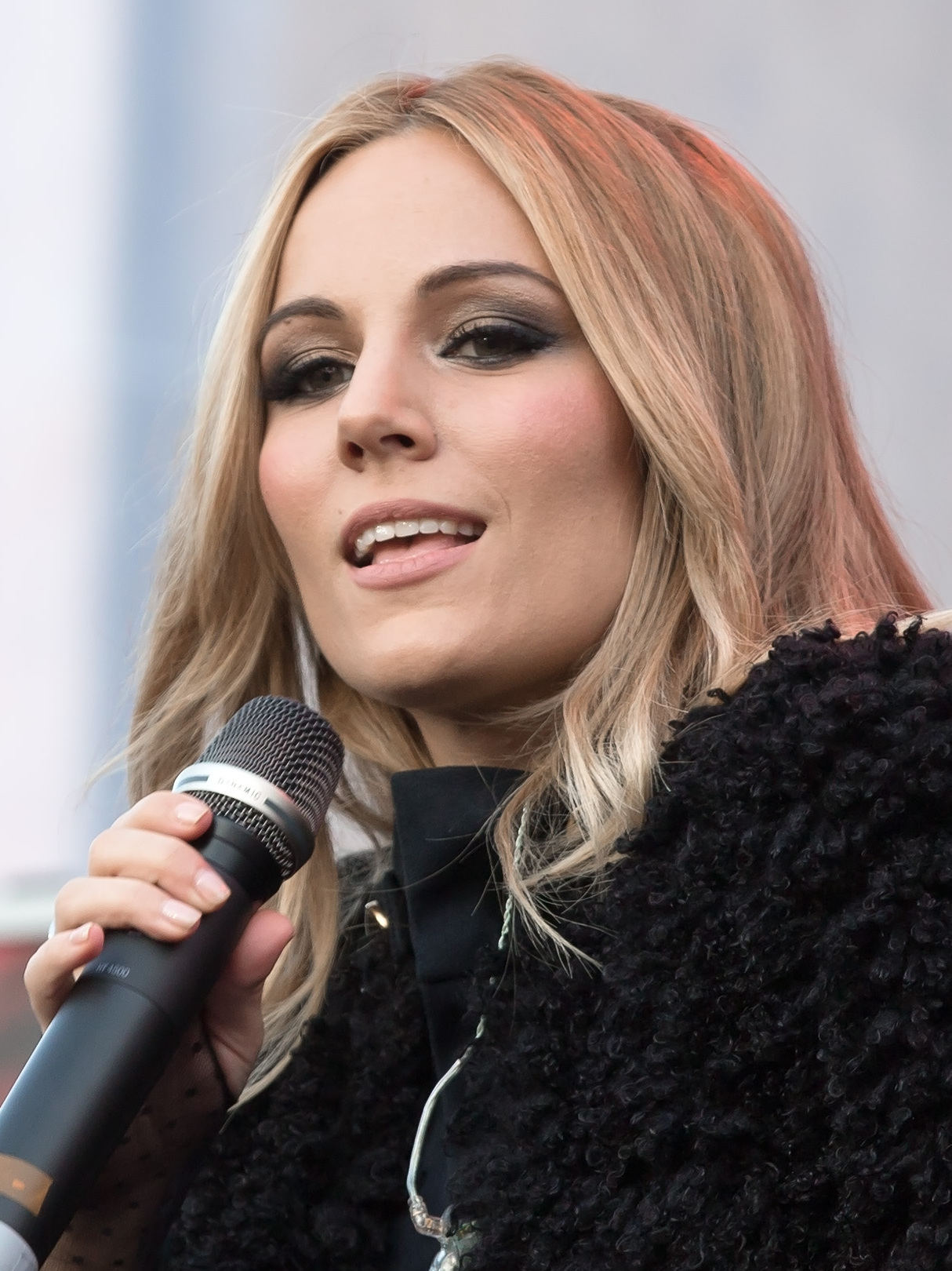
Edurne

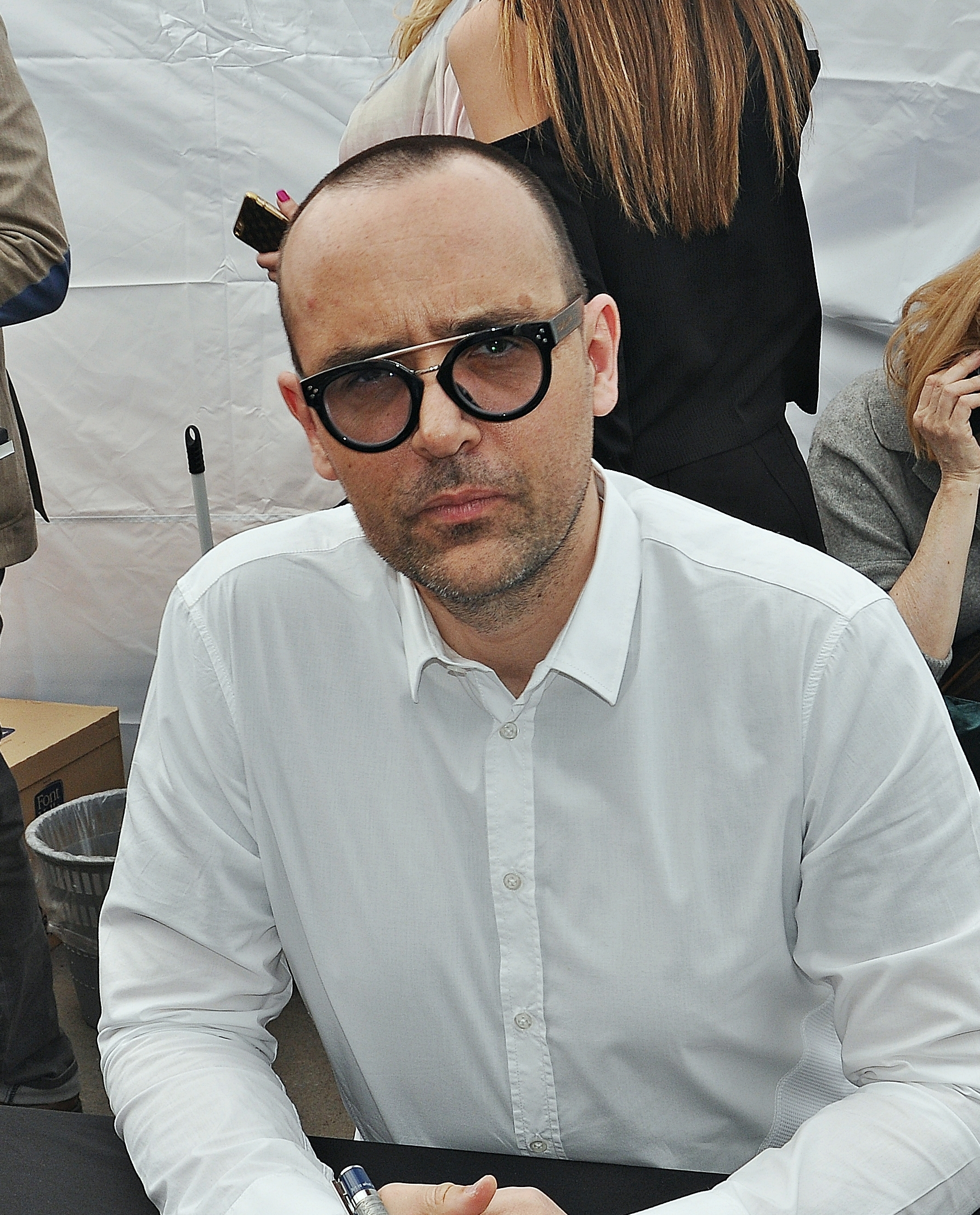
Risto Mejide

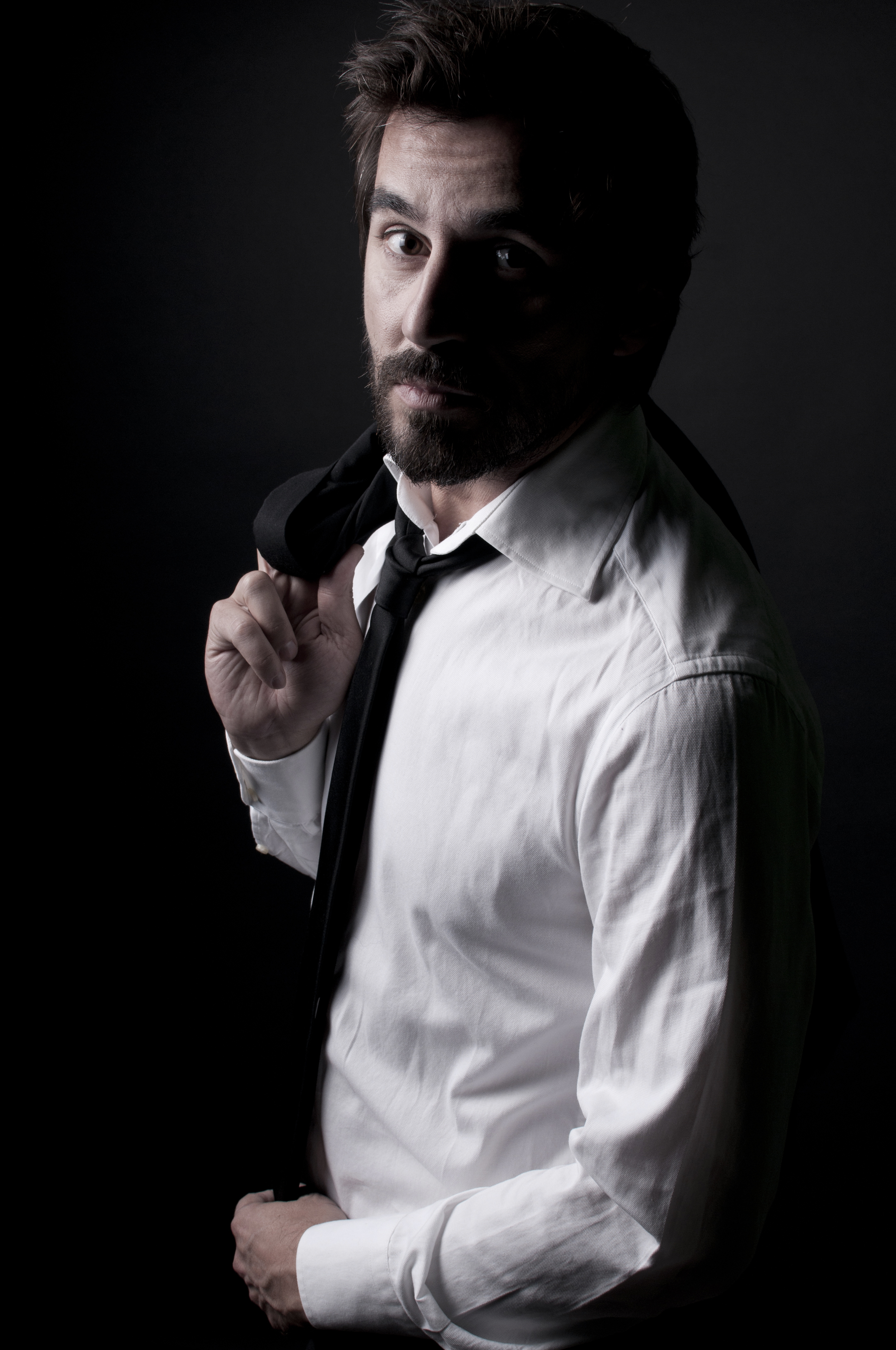
Santi Millán

== David Garcia Controversy ==
During the auditions, singer David Garcia was initially buzzed off by the judges (though Dani Martínez pressed Paz Padilla & Risto Mejide's buzzers). After this happened, Risto Mejide and Dani Martínez argued, with Mejide accusing Martínez of being incapable of giving a proper assessment of the act, and backing down from giving negative feedback to Garcia. To make a point, Mejide stated - ""I'm going to play Dani Martínez and I want to tell you that I'm dying for you to release an album so I can buy every single copy, every single one for me. I owe it to this competition and to the people I love. I have to tell you that if he wants to see you again and wants to hear you in the semifinals... Since he's like a brother to me... Do you want to see him in the semifinals? Do you want to be happy? All for a brother..." before pressing the Golden Buzzer, sending Garcia immediately through to the live shows. This confused almost everyone watching, including Garcia himself.

In the fourth Semi-Final, Garcia sang an original song. Mejide clarified that the reason he pressed the Golden Buzzer was to send a message to his co-panelists and all other talent show judges, that this is what happens when you reward someone just to make them happy, and it was a demonstration of how you can't say yes to everyone. He told David that he didn't have anything against him, and he was glad that the Golden Buzzer helped him and made him happy, but he pressed it purely to make a point. Paz Padilla initially wanted to award him a second live show Golden Buzzer (though mainly as a response to Mejide's decision she adamantly disagreed with), but this was declined by the other judges. Despite everything, David Garcia actually made the Top 4 of the night, and was given a vote, once again from Mejide, to 'keep consistent with his point'. He didn't advance any further however. This action from Mejide received many criticisms from other cast members, and viewers alike.

== Season overview ==
Participant	Age(s)	Genre	Act	Semi-final	Finished
Acrobarcelona		Acrobatics	Acrobatic Crew	1	Eliminated
Aitor Frances El Ilusionista		Magic	Horror Illusionists	3	Eliminated
Asociacion Nana		Dance	Dance Group	1	Eliminated
Aya Teyar		Singing	Singer	4	Eliminated
BDance Megacrew		Dance	Dance Group	3	Finalist
Big Moon		Singing	Singer	2	Eliminated
Blake Eduardo		Magic	Comedy Magic Act	3	Finalist
Bruce Blanchard		Dance	Dancer	4	Eliminated
Chiara		Singing	Singer & Guitarist	4	Finalist
Chuck Skellington		Singing	Singer	4	Eliminated
Clownic		Comedy	Sketch Comedy Trio	3	Eliminated
Danger & Yunaisy		Dance	Dance Duo	3	Eliminated
Da Republik		Dance	Dance Crew	4	Finalist
Daniela Munoz		Dance	Flamenco Dancer	4	Eliminated
Danza.Es		Dance	Ballet Dance Troupe	1	Eliminated
Dario Proximity		Magic	Magician	1	Eliminated
David Batista		Singing	Variety Singer	4	Eliminated
David Garcia		Singing	Singer	4	Eliminated
David Pastor		Dance	Dancer	3	Eliminated
Duo Angeles		Danger	Extreme Roller Skating Duo	2	Eliminated
Duo Forza		Acrobatics	Aerial Acrobats	3	Eliminated
Eduardo Aramayo		Danger	Danger Act	1	Eliminated
El Artista. Montemayor		Danger	Medieval Fighting Act	4	Eliminated
El Porruo		Strength	Strongman	2	Eliminated
Eric Boo		Comedy	Clown Act	1	Eliminated
Faboo		Novelty	Human Puppet Act	2	Eliminated
Flick Flock Danza		Dance	Dance Group	4	Eliminated
Flowtime		Singing	Rap Duo	2	Eliminated
Florencia Pasquet		Singing	Singer	1	Eliminated
Hermes Pompa		Acrobatics	Aerialist	1	Finalist
Hugo Molina		Music	Drummer	1	Winner
In Extremis Show Team		Acrobatics	Acrobatic Group	3	Eliminated
Ismailah		Singing	Singer	3	3rd Place
Jazzy		Singing	Singer	1	Eliminated
Jose Antonio		Singing	Flamenco Singer	1	Eliminated
Julia Gonzalez		Singing	Singer & Guitarist	3	Eliminated
Kanak		Dance	Dance Group	3	Eliminated
Keiichi Iwasaki		Magic	Novelty Magic Act	2	Finalist
Laura Gonz		Singing	Musical Theatre Singer	1	Eliminated
Levi Y Estrella		Dance	Dance Duo	2	Finalist
MagoDeLucasss		Magic	Magician	4	2nd Place
Marc Garcia		Magic	Magician	2	Eliminated
Mario Prieto		Dance	Dancer	3	Eliminated
Melanie		Magic	Magician	1	Eliminated
MiniDanceTeam.Es		Dance	Dance Group	2	Eliminated
Nicola Virdis		Novelty	Boomwhacker Act	4	Eliminated
Papi Flex		Dance	Contortionist Dancer	3	Eliminated
Pedro Volta		Magic	Escape Artist	4	Eliminated
Pitu		Dance	Dancer	1	Finalist
Raquel Cruz		Singing	Singer	2	Eliminated
Ruben Serrano		Comedy	Audience Participation Comedian	4	Eliminated
Sakir Uyar		Danger	Extreme Martial Artist	2	Eliminated
Sion		Singing	Opera Singer	2	Eliminated
Triana La Canela		Dance	Flamenco Dancer	2	Finalist
What a Beast		Dance	Interpretive Dance Group	2	Eliminated
Xayo		Variety	Drag Act	3	Eliminated

=== Semi-Finals summary ===
Buzzed Out | Live Golden Buzzer | Advanced to Finals (Golden Buzzer) | Advanced to Finals (Public Vote Winner) | Eliminated (Top 4 - Lost Judges' Choice)

==== Semi-final 1 (25 November) ====
The Judges collectively decided that Hugo Molina deserved a Group Golden Buzzer, therefore only 1 act moved on via public vote, and 1 act moved on via the judges' vote (the judges also had 3 acts to choose from instead of 2).

Semi-finalist	Order	Performance type	Buzzes and Judges' Votes				Result
Semi-finalist	Order	Performance type	Mejide	Edurne	Martínez	Padilla	Result
Laura Gonz	1	Musical Theatre Singer					Eliminated
Acrobarcelona	2	Acrobatic Crew					Eliminated (Lost Judges' Vote)
Dario Proximity	3	Magician	^{1}		^{1}	^{1}	Eliminated
Danza.Es	4	Ballet Dance Troupe					Eliminated
Florencia Pasquet	5	Singer					Eliminated
Hermes Pompa	6	Aerialist					Advanced
Melanie	7	Magician					Eliminated (Lost Judges' Vote)
Asociacion Nana	8	Dance Group					Eliminated
Jose Antonio	9	Flamenco Singer					Eliminated
Jazzy	10	Singer					Eliminated
Pitu	11	Dancer					Advanced (Won Judges' Vote)
Hugo Molina	12	Drummer	Live Golden Buzzer	Live Golden Buzzer	Live Golden Buzzer	Live Golden Buzzer	Golden Buzzer Advancement
Eduardo Aramayo	13	Danger Act					Eliminated
Eric Boo	14	Clown Act					Eliminated

- ^1 Mejide, Martinez & Padilla all pressed their buzzers in response to a quip made by Proximity (Padilla pressed for Martinez) though these buzzes were never removed.

==== Semi-final 2 (2 December) ====
The Judges could not agree collectively on a Golden Buzzer during this show, despite multiple nominations from each judge. Therefore, 2 acts moved on via public vote, and 1 act moved on via judges' vote (the judges only had 2 acts to choose from this time).

Semi-finalist	Order	Performance type	Buzzes and Judges' Votes				Result
Semi-finalist	Order	Performance type	Mejide	Edurne	Martínez	Padilla	Result
Duo Angeles	1	Extreme Roller Skating Duo					Eliminated
MiniDanceTeam.Es	2	Dance Group					Eliminated
Sion	3	Opera Singer					Eliminated
Keiichi Iwasaki	4	Novelty Magic Act					Advanced
Triana La Canela	5	Flamenco Dancer				^{2}	Advanced (Won Judges' Vote)
El Porruo	6	Strongman					Eliminated
What a Beast	7	Interpretive Dance Group					Eliminated
Flowtime	8	Rap Duo					Eliminated
Levi Y Estrella	9	Dance Duo					Advanced
Raquel Cruz	10	Singer					Eliminated
Faboo	11	Human Puppet Act					Eliminated
Big Moon	12	Singer					Eliminated
Marc Garcia	13	Magician				^{2}	Eliminated (Lost Judges' Vote)
Sakir Uyar	14	Extreme Martial Artist					Eliminated

- ^2 Paz Padilla did not reveal her voting intention, as Traina La Canella had already received the majority votes.

==== Semi-final 3 (9 December) ====
For the second time, the judges could not collectively agree on a Golden Buzzer act, so the buzzer was never used (despite Paz Padilla accidentally pressing it). Like the last show, 2 acts moved on immediately via public vote, and 2 acts were left in the judges' vote, the act with the majority votes advancing also.

Semi-finalist	Order	Performance type	Buzzes and Judges' Votes				Result
Semi-finalist	Order	Performance type	Mejide	Edurne	Martínez	Padilla	Result
In Extremis Show Team	1	Acrobatic Group					Eliminated
Mario Prieto	2	Dancer					Eliminated (Lost Judges' Vote)
Julia Gonzalez	3	Singer & Guitarist					Eliminated
Kanak	4	Dance Group					Eliminated
Blake Eduardo	5	Comedy Magic Act					Advanced
Duo Forza	6	Aerial Acrobats					Eliminated
BDance Megacrew	7	Dance Group					Advanced
Clownic	8	Sketch Comedy Trio					Eliminated
David Pastor	9	Dancer					Eliminated
Papi Flex	10	Contortionist Dancer					Eliminated
Ismailah	11	Singer					Advanced (Won Judges' Vote)
Danger & Yunaisy	12	Dance Duo					Eliminated
Aitor Frances El Ilusionista	13	Horror Illusionists				^{3}	Eliminated
Xayo	14	Drag Act					Eliminated

- ^3 Paz Padilla accidentally pressed the Golden Buzzer for Aitor Frances El Ilusionista, when trying to convince the other judges to do so. This did not count however.

==== Semi-final 4 (13 December) ====
The judges collectively agreed that Da RepubliK deserved the Golden Buzzer in this show, so only 1 act advanced via public vote, and 1 act via judges' choice, completing the final 12.

Semi-finalist	Order	Performance type	Buzzes and Judges' Votes				Result
Semi-finalist	Order	Performance type	Mejide	Edurne	Martínez	Padilla	Result
El Artista. Montemayor	1	Medieval Fighting Act					Eliminated
Daniela Munoz	2	Flamenco Dancer					Eliminated (Lost Judges' Vote)
MagoDeLucasss	3	Magician					Advanced
Flick Flock Danza	4	Dance Group					Eliminated
David Garcia	5	Singer					Eliminated (Lost Judges' Vote)
Da Republik	6	Dance Crew	Live Golden Buzzer	Live Golden Buzzer	Live Golden Buzzer	Live Golden Buzzer	Golden Buzzer Advancement
Chiara	7	Singer & Guitarist					Advanced (Won Judges' Vote)
Bruce Blanchard	8	Dancer					Eliminated
Aya Teyar	9	Singer					Eliminated
Pedro Volta^{4}	10	Escape Artist					Eliminated
Nicola Virdis	11	Boomwhacker Act					Eliminated
Chuck Skellington	12	Singer					Eliminated
Ruben Serrano	13	Audience Participation Comedian					Eliminated
David Batista	14	Variety Singer					Eliminated

- ^4 Pedro Volta's performance had to be stopped, due to him having an apnea attack in the middle of his escape. A medical team stepped in to help, and Volta was removed from the water tank.

=== Finals summary ===
Buzzed Out | Winner |

==== Grand Final (16 December) ====
Semi-finalist	Order	Performance type	Buzzes and Judges' Votes				Result
Semi-finalist	Order	Performance type	Mejide	Edurne	Martínez	Padilla	Result
Da Republik	1	Dance Crew					8th - Eliminated
Keiichi Iwasaki	2	Novelty Magic Act					10th - Eliminated
Ismailah	3	Singer					3rd Place
Triana La Canela	4	Flamenco Dancer					5th - Eliminated
Hermes Pompa	5	Aerialist					11th - Eliminated
Chiara	6	Singer					7th - Eliminated
MagoDeLucasss	7	Magician					2nd Place
BDance Megacrew	8	Dance Group					6th - Eliminated
Hugo Molina	9	Drummer					1st - Winner
Levi Y Estrella	10	Dance Duo			^{5}		4th Place
Blake Eduardo	11	Comedy Magic Act					12th - Eliminated
Pitu	12	Dancer					9th - Eliminated

- ^5 Dani Martínez jokingly pressed his buzzer after Levi Y Estrella's performance, aimed at Santi Milan's attempts to imitate them.

== Ratings ==
Order	Episode	Viewers (millions)	Share
1	"Auditions 1"	2.37	19.6%
2	"Auditions 2"	2.62	22.4%
3	"Auditions 3"	2.35	20.6%
4	"Auditions 4"	2.34	20.5%
5	"Auditions 5"	2.22	19.9%
6	"Auditions 6"	2.35	22.1%
7	"Auditions 7"	2.25	23.2%
8	"Auditions 8"	1.93	14.5%
9	"Auditions 9"	2.38	21.7%
10	"Auditions 10"	2.51	23.2%
11	"Semi-Final 1"	2.40	24.9%
12	"Semi-Final 2"	2.37	24.0%
13	"Semi-Final 3"	2.16	21.7%
14	"Semi-Final 4"	1.95	17.8%
15	"Grand Final"	2.98	29.0%
