= Got Talent España season 6 =

Got Talent España
- Season 6
- Presented by: Santi Millán
- Judges: Risto Mejide; Edurne; Dani Martínez; Paz Padilla (Live Shows)
- Winner: Celia Muñoz
- Runner-up: Santi Marcilla

Release
- Original network: Telecinco
- Original release: 15 January – 30 April 2021

Season chronology
- ← Previous; Season 5 Next → Season 7

The sixth season of the television program Got Talent España aired on Telecinco from January 15, 2021, to April 30, 2021, usually going out on a Friday at 10:00 PM. The talent competition was hosted once again by Santi Millán and produced by Fremantle. Season 6 featured the return of Paz Padilla, Dani Martínez, Edurne and Risto Mejide to the judging panel, although due to the death of her husband, Paz Padilla did not partake in filming the auditions, leaving the panel with just three members. When Padilla rejoined the panel for the live shows, her seat was shifted to the third position, whilst Dani Martínez took the fourth. At the end of the season, it was announced, after much speculation, that Paz Padilla would not be returning to the show after three seasons, and the following season featured only Mejide, Edurne and Martínez as judges. The winner of the sixth season was singing ventriloquist Celia Muñoz, while the runner-up was magician and illusionist Santi Marcilla. The sixth season achieved an average audience share of 19.8%, with an average viewing figure of 2,745,000.

== Format ==
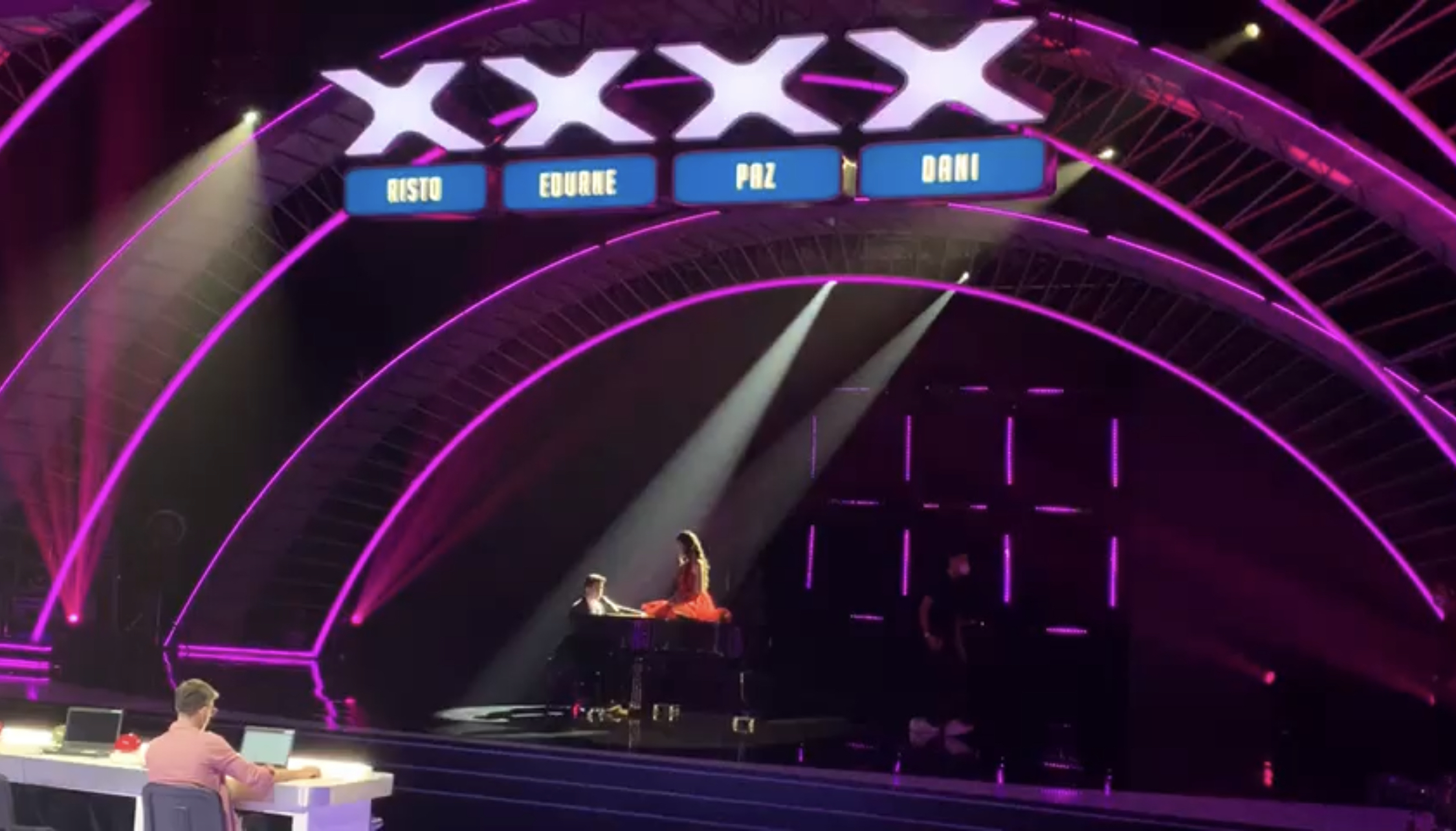
The stage as it appeared in the Live Shows of Season 6. X's (from L to R) Mejide, Edurne, Padilla, Martínez.

Each judge has the power to press a red buzzer in front of them if they dislike a performance, with four buzzers stopping the act immediately (or three in the case of the auditions). The Golden Buzzer, a well-known and very popular staple by this point, returned, allowing each judge and the host to send one act straight to the live semi-finals. In the semi-finals, acts performed live for the public vote, with the judges offering critiques. During the live shows of this season, no judge buzzed apart from Risto Mejide, who buzzed once intentionally and had an act press his buzzer on his behalf. A collective Golden Buzzer was available during these rounds, allowing the judges to unanimously send one standout act straight to the Grand Final. The winner was ultimately decided by the public vote in the Grand Final, securing not only the title of Spain's most talented act but also a cash prize and national recognition.

Judges and Presenter for Got Talent España Season 6

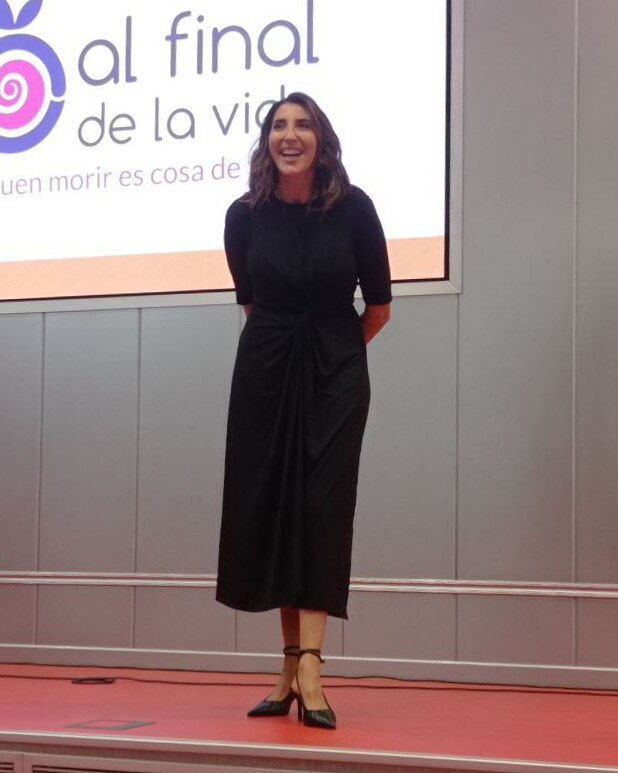
Paz Padilla (Live Shows Only)

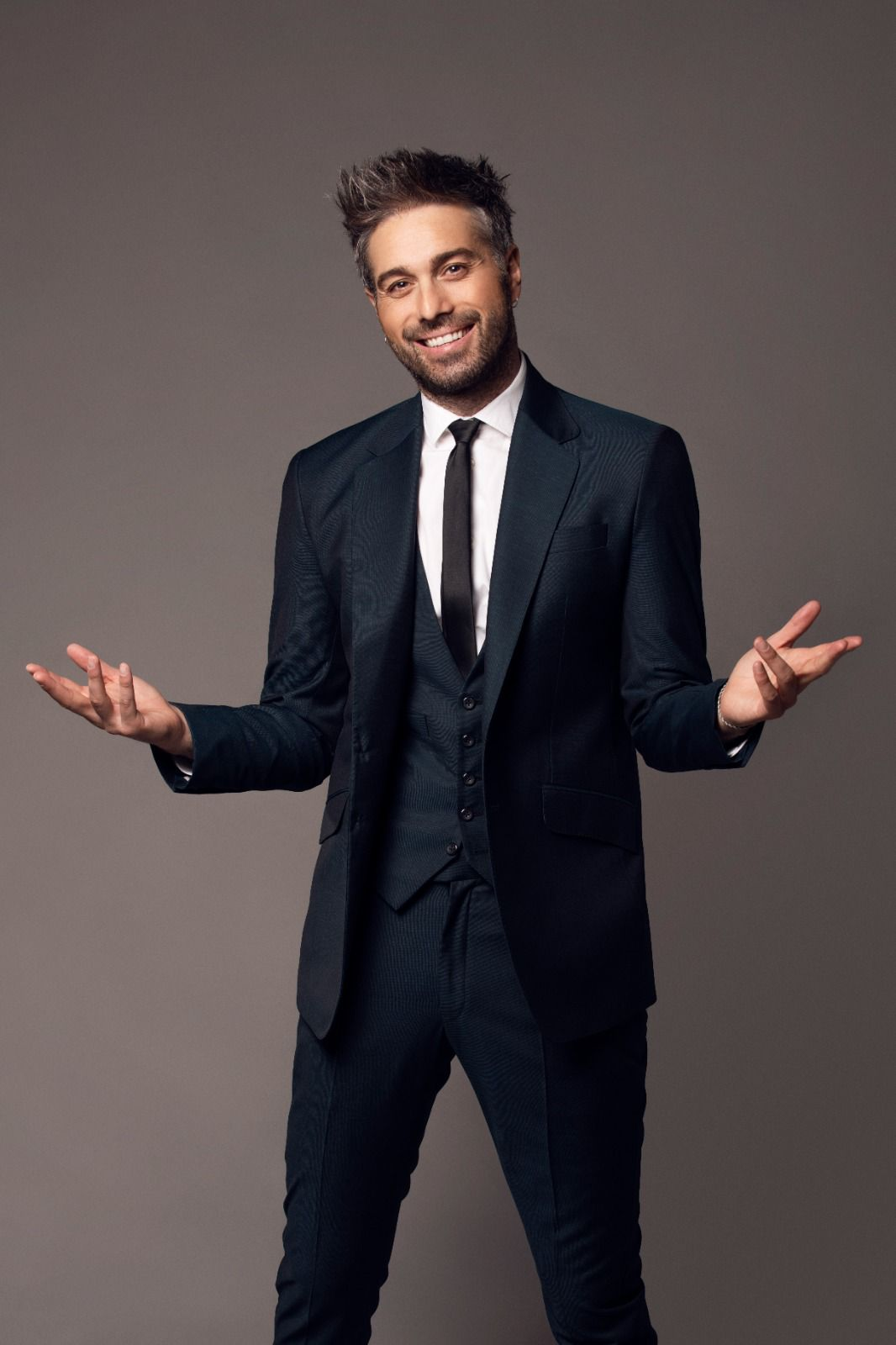
Dani Martínez

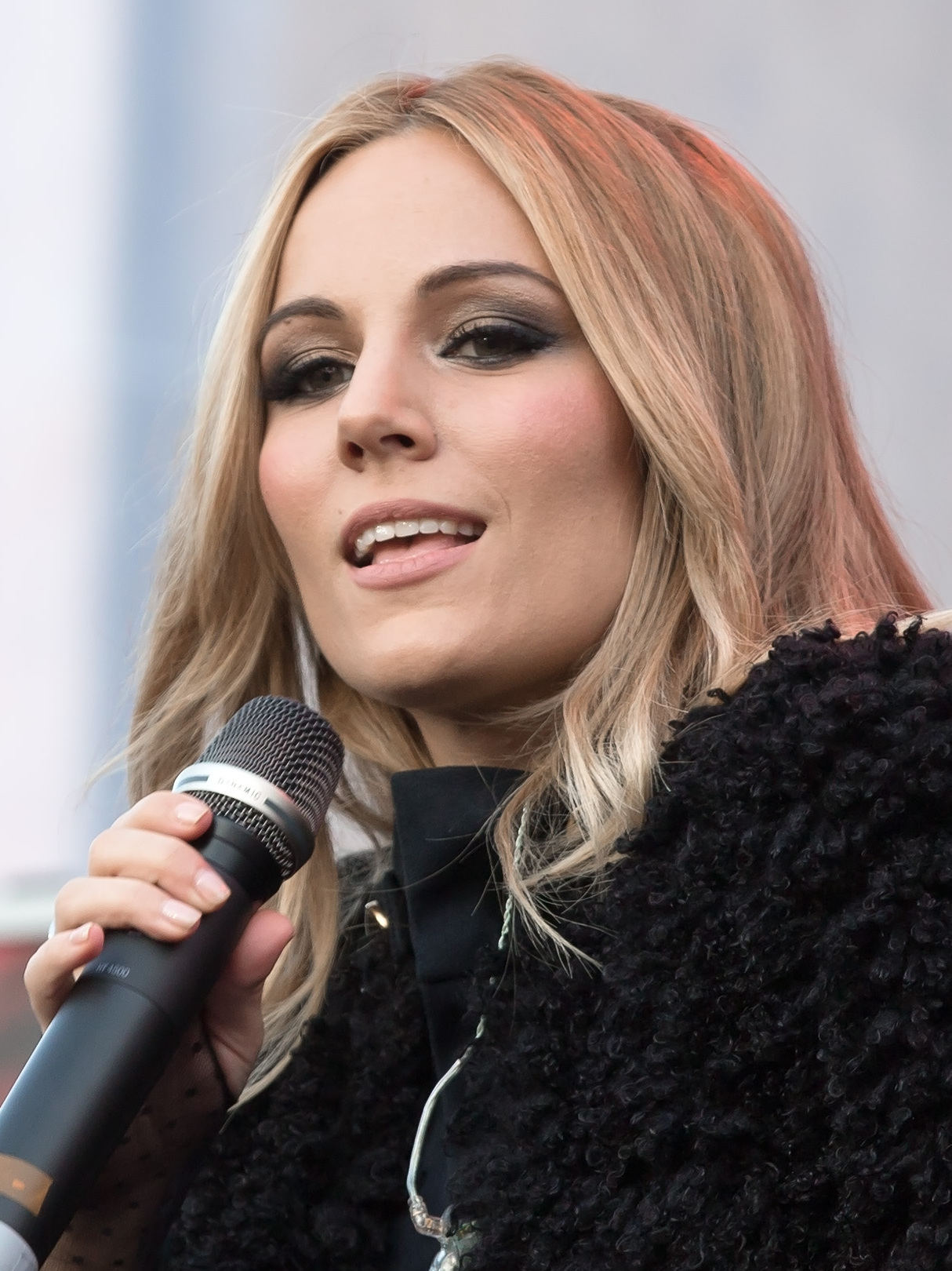
Edurne

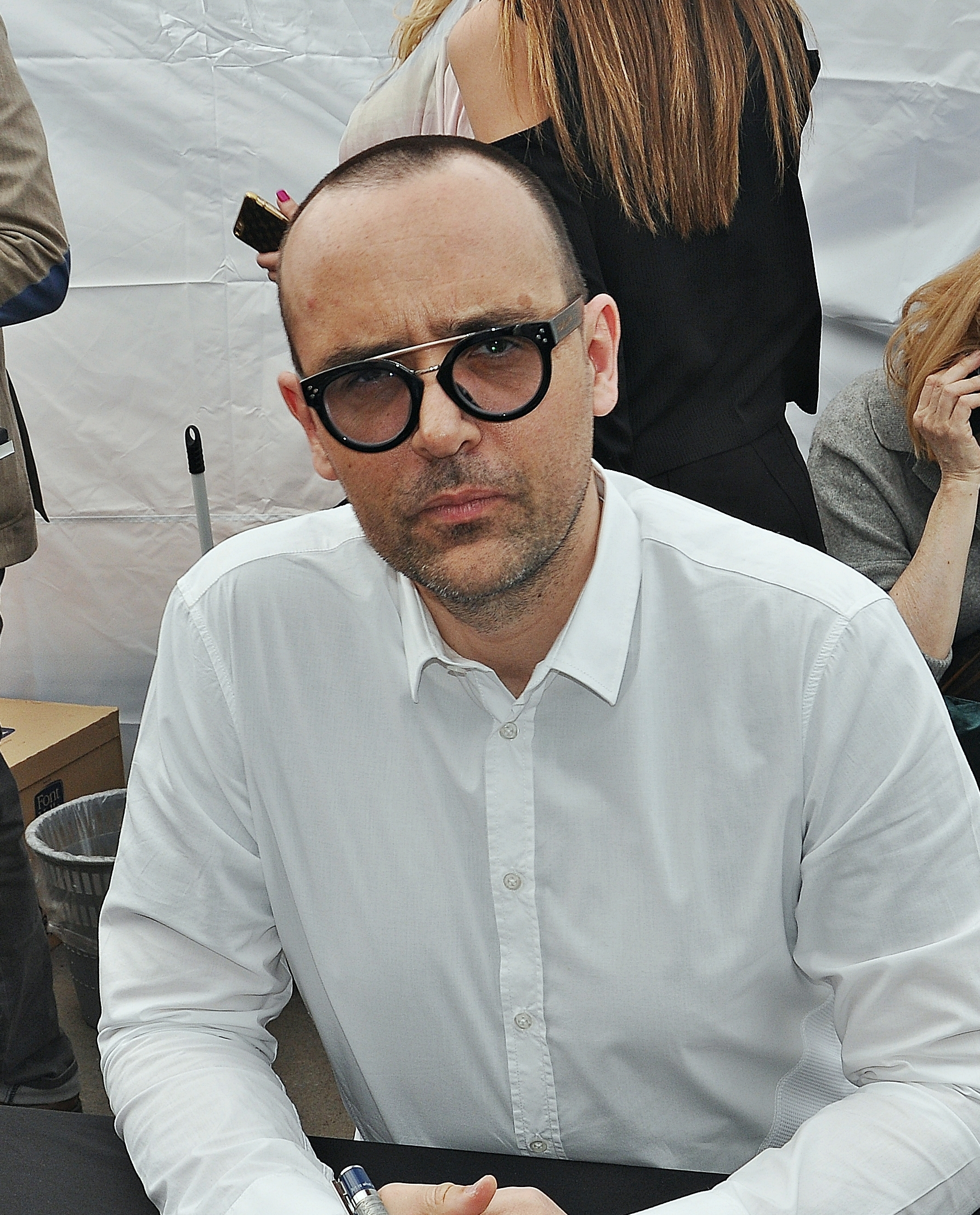
Risto Mejide

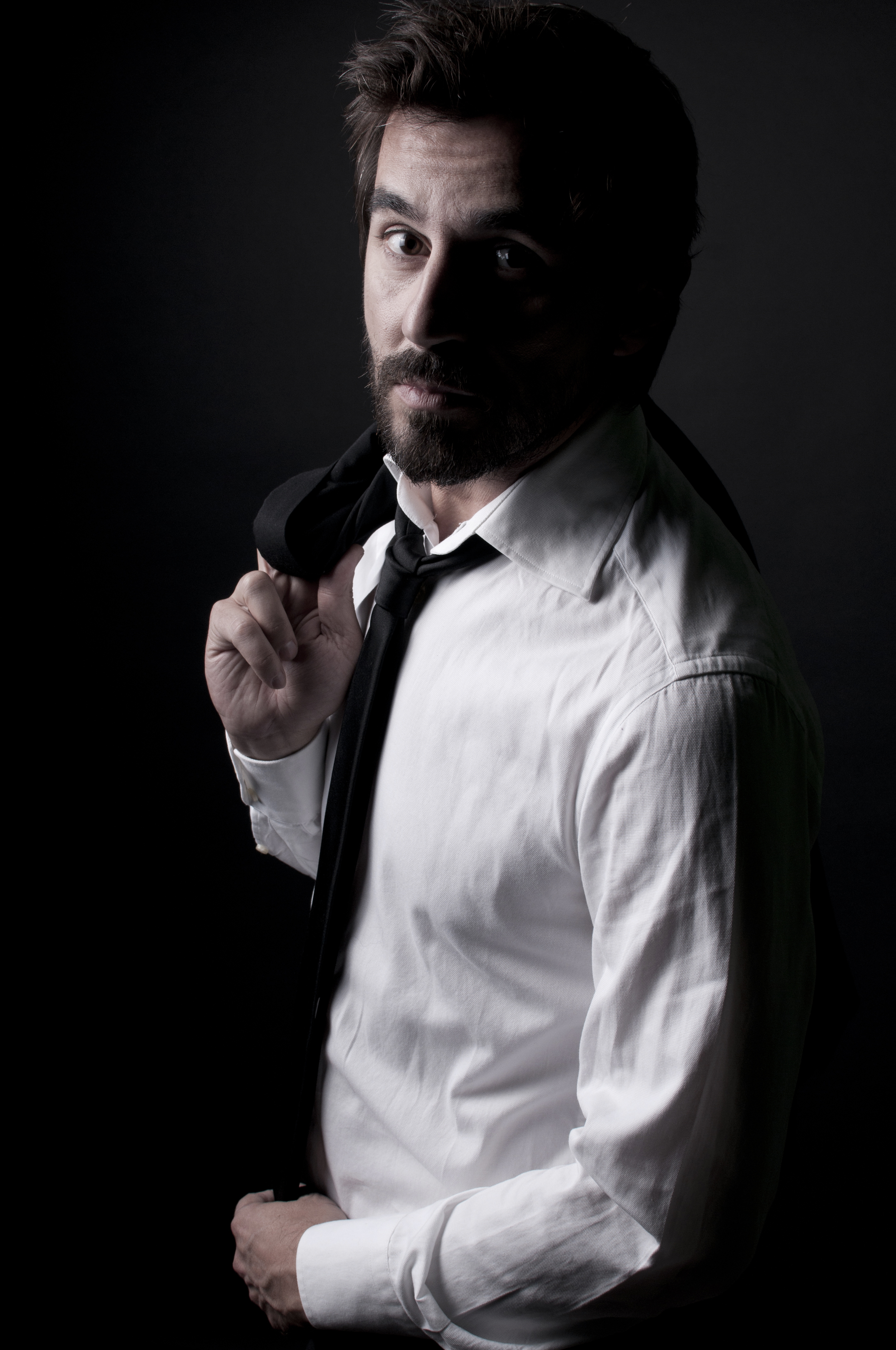
Santi Millán

== Golden Buzzer ==
The Golden Buzzer was used 12 times during the season: Otamatone Player – Juanjo Monserrat (Mejide), Magician – Yao (Mejide & Edurne), Pianist – Anton Cortes (Mejide & Martínez), Dance Crew – Immortals Corporation (Edurne), Opera Singer – Juan Carlos Martos (Edurne & Martínez), Comedy Dance Group – Enjoy Productions (Martínez), Singer – Elsa Tortonda (Mejide, Edurne & Martínez), Drag Flamenco Dancer – Albert Infante (Millán), Dance Duo – Papa & Neylia (Millán, on behalf of Padilla in the auditions, Live Shows – Mejide, Edurne, Padilla & Martínez), Drag Singer – Chus Serrano (Live Shows – Mejide, Edurne, Padilla & Martínez), Ventriloquist Singer and eventual winner – Celia Muñoz (Live Shows – Mejide, Edurne, Padilla & Martínez).

== Season overview ==
| Participant | Age(s) | Genre | Act | Semi-final | Finished |
|---|---|---|---|---|---|
| Adan Borges | 29 | Singing | Singer | 2 | Eliminated |
| Adolfo Masyebra | 29 | Magic | Hypnotist Magician | 3 | Eliminated |
| Albert Infante | 21 | Variety | Drag Flamenco Dancer | 4 | Eliminated |
| Alex Dowis | 41 | Variety | Light Painting Act | 4 | Finalist |
| Ana Crisman | 36 | Music | Harpist | 3 | Eliminated |
| Anton Cortes | 13 | Music | Pianist | 2 | Eliminated |
| Ariel Hamui | 27 | Magic | Mentalist Magician | 2 | Eliminated |
| B&B Twins | 12, 13 | Dance | Street Dance Duo | 3 | Eliminated |
| Belen Elvira | 48 | Singing | Opera Singer | 4 | Eliminated |
| Blade 2 Blade | 29, 38 | Danger | Knife Throwing Duo | 1 | Eliminated |
| Celia Munoz | 35 | Variety | Ventriloquist Singer | 3 | Winner |
| Chus Serrano | 37 | Variety | Drag Singer | 1 | Finalist |
| Compagnia Colonna | 16–36 | Acrobatics | Pole Acrobats | 3 | Eliminated |
| Compania De Pablo Mendez Performances | 18–35 | Variety | Variety Circus Group | 2 | Eliminated |
| Coraly Corazon | 41 | Danger | Danger Dance Act | 2 | Eliminated |
| Cristian Montilla | 27 | Singing | Flamenco Singer | 2 | Finalist |
| Duo Believe | 21, 25 | Acrobatics | Pole Aerialists | 4 | Finalists |
| Duo Deibit & Nymeria | 32, 36 | Acrobatics | Acrobatic Duo | 1 | Eliminated |
| Duo Ebenezer | 23, 25 | Dance | Dance Duo | 2 | Eliminated |
| Duo Tela Marinera | 28, 30 | Acrobatics | Aerial Duo | 3 | Eliminated |
| Elsa Tortonda | 16 | Singing | Singer | 3 | 3rd Place |
| Encarna Garrido | 48 | Danger | Archery Act | 4 | Eliminated |
| Enjoy Productions | 33–40 | Dance | Comedy Dance Group | 4 | Eliminated |
| Estefania Galera | 34 | Magic | Magician | 1 | Eliminated |
| Eugene | 25 | Variety | Drag Singer & Aerialist Acrobat | 2 | Eliminated |
| Florian Sainvent | 29 | Magic | Magician | 2 | Eliminated |
| Fredy Beats | 29 | Music | Beatboxer | 3 | Eliminated |
| Geoprism | 17–23 | Dance | K-Pop Dance Group | 3 | Eliminated |
| Gines Gonzalez | 25 | Singing | Singer & Pianist | 3 | Eliminated |
| Gisela Quiros | 18 | Singing | Singer & Guitarist | 4 | Eliminated |
| Golspel IT | 18–43 | Singing | Choir | 3 | Eliminated |
| Guillermo Gomez | 13 | Dance | Rollerskating Dancer | 4 | Eliminated |
| Helena Pardo | 15 | Singing | Singer | 2 | Eliminated |
| Immortals Corporation | 13–23 | Dance | Dance Crew | 3 | Eliminated |
| Isama & Miguel | 15, 47 | Music | Accordion Duo | 4 | Eliminated |
| Javi Capitan | 30 | Comedy | Stand-Up Comedian | 1 | Eliminated |
| Juan Carlos Martos | 59 | Singing | Opera Singer | 2 | Finalist |
| Juanjo Monserrat | 28 | Music | Otamatone Player | 1 | Eliminated |
| Manolo Costa & Mindanguillo | 31, 37 | Magic | Comedy Magic Duo | 4 | Eliminated |
| Maria Cruz | 19 | Dance | Flamenco Dancer | 1 | Finalist |
| Mirai Nikki | 13–18 | Dance | Dance Group | 1 | Eliminated |
| Oleg Tatarynov | 31 | Dance | Aerialist Dancer | 1 | Eliminated |
| Ot Pi Play | 49 | Danger | Stunt Bike Performer | 1 | Eliminated |
| Papa & Neylia | 8, 31 | Dance | Dance Duo | 4 | Finalists |
| Paupi El Mago | 23 | Magic | Horror Magician | 4 | Eliminated |
| Pilar & Pili Piloncha | 14 | Variety | Ventriloquist | 2 | Eliminated |
| Rob Delion | 39 | Singing | Singer | 4 | Eliminated |
| Santi Marcilla | 24 | Magic | Close-Up Magician | 3 | 2nd Place |
| Senmaru | 51 | Magic | Novelty Magic Act | 4 | Eliminated |
| Sergi Prim & Marta Mendes | 14, 16 | Singing | Vocal Duo & Pianist | 1 | Eliminated |
| Stefanny & Michael | 25, 26 | Dance | Dance Duo | 2 | Finalists |
| Suha Perez | 6 | Variety | Strength/Athletic Act | 1 | Eliminated |
| Ukabox | 13–17 | Dance | Dance Group | 2 | Eliminated |
| Violincheli Brothers | 13, 16 | Music | String Duo | 1 | Finalists |
| Yao | 27 | Magic | Magician | 1 | Eliminated |
| Yoni El Remache | 22 | Dance | Flamenco Dancer | 3 | Eliminated |

=== Semi-Finals summary ===
Buzzed Out | Live Golden Buzzer | Advanced to Finals (Golden Buzzer) | Advanced to Finals (Public Vote Winner) | Eliminated (Top 4 - Lost Judges' Choice)

==== Semi-final 1 (26 March) ====
The Judges collectively decided that Chus Serrano deserved a Group Golden Buzzer, therefore only 1 act moved on via public vote, and 1 act moved on via the judges' vote (the judges also had 3 acts to choose from instead of 2).

| Semi-finalist | Order | Performance type | Buzzes and Judges' Votes | | | | Result |
| Semi-finalist | Order | Performance type | Mejide | Edurne | Padilla | Martínez | Result |
|---|---|---|---|---|---|---|---|
| Oleg Tatarynov | 1 | Aerialist Dancer | | | | | Eliminated |
| Violincheli Brothers | 2 | String Duo | | | | | Advanced (Won Judges' Vote) |
| Ot Pi Play | 3 | Stunt Bike Performer | | | | | Eliminated |
| Sergi Prim & Marta Mendes | 4 | Vocal Duo & Pianist | | | | | Eliminated |
| Suha Perez | 5 | Strength/Athletic Act | | | | | Eliminated |
| Mirai Nikki | 6 | Dance Group | | | | | Eliminated |
| Yao | 7 | Magician | | | | | Eliminated |
| Maria Cruz | 8 | Flamenco Dancer | | | | | Advanced |
| Duo Deibit & Nymeria | 9 | Acrobatic Duo | | | | | Eliminated |
| Estefania Galera | 10 | Magician | | | | | Eliminated |
| Chus Serrano^{1} | 11 | Drag Singer | Live Golden Buzzer | Live Golden Buzzer | Live Golden Buzzer | Live Golden Buzzer | Golden Buzzer Advancement |
| Javi Capitan | 12 | Stand-Up Comedian | | | | | Eliminated |
| Blade 2 Blade | 13 | Knife Throwing Duo | | | | | Eliminated (Lost Judges' Vote) |
| Juanjo Monserrat | 14 | Otamatone Player | | | | | Eliminated (Lost Judges' Vote) |

- ^1 Chus Serrano was brought back onstage by the panel after he had just walked off, since they decided he should've received the golden buzzer.

==== Semi-final 2 (9 April) ====
The Judges could not agree collectively on a Golden Buzzer during this show, despite multiple nominations from each judge. Therefore, 2 acts moved on via public vote, and 1 act moved on via judges' vote (the judges only had 2 acts to choose from this time).

| Semi-finalist | Order | Performance type | Buzzes and Judges' Votes | | | | Result |
| Semi-finalist | Order | Performance type | Mejide | Edurne | Padilla | Martínez | Result |
|---|---|---|---|---|---|---|---|
| Compania De Pablo Mendez Performances | 1 | Variety Circus Group | | | | | Eliminated |
| Anton Cortes | 2 | Pianist | | | | | Eliminated |
| Duo Ebenezer | 3 | Dance Duo | | | | | Eliminated |
| Helena Pardo | 4 | Singer | | | | | Eliminated |
| Pilar & Pili Piloncha | 5 | Ventriloquist | | | | | Eliminated |
| Florian Sainvent | 6 | Magician | | | | | Eliminated |
| Eugene | 7 | Drag Singer & Aerialist Acrobat | | | | | Eliminated |
| Juan Carlos Martos | 8 | Opera Singer | | | | | Advanced |
| Ukabox | 9 | Dance Group | ^{2} | | | | Eliminated (Lost Judges' Vote) |
| Cristian Montilla | 10 | Flamenco Singer | | | | | Advanced |
| Ariel Hamui | 11 | Mentalist Magician | | | | | Eliminated |
| Stefanny & Michael | 12 | Dance Duo | ^{2} | | | | Advanced (Won Judges' Vote) |
| Adan Borges | 13 | Singer | | | | | Eliminated |
| Coraly Corazon | 14 | Danger Dance Act | | | | | Eliminated |

- ^2 Risto Mejide did not reveal his voting intention, as Stefanny & Michael already had the majority votes, though indicated that he would've voted for the former.

==== Semi-final 3 (16 April) ====
The Judges collectively decided that Celia Muñoz deserved a Group Golden Buzzer, therefore only 1 act moved on via public vote, and 1 act moved on via the judges' vote (the judges also had 3 acts to choose from instead of 2).

| Semi-finalist | Order | Performance type | Buzzes and Judges' Votes | | | | Result |
| Semi-finalist | Order | Performance type | Mejide | Edurne | Padilla | Martínez | Result |
|---|---|---|---|---|---|---|---|
| Immortals Corporation | 1 | Dance Crew | | | | | Eliminated |
| Santi Marcilla | 2 | Close-Up Magician | | | | | Advanced (Judges' Vote Tied - Won by Public Vote) |
| Yoni El Remache | 3 | Flamenco Dancer | | | | | Eliminated (Judges' Vote Tied - Lost by Public Vote) |
| Goslpel IT | 4 | Choir | | | | | Eliminated |
| Celia Munoz | 5 | Ventriloquist Singer | Live Golden Buzzer | Live Golden Buzzer | Live Golden Buzzer | Live Golden Buzzer | Golden Buzzer Advancement |
| Elsa Tortonda | 6 | Singer | | | | | Advanced |
| Compagnia Colonna | 7 | Pole Acrobats | | | | | Eliminated |
| B&B Twins | 8 | Street Dance Duo | | | | | Eliminated |
| Gines Gonzalez | 9 | Singer & Pianist | | | | | Eliminated |
| Fredy Beats | 10 | Beatboxer | | | | | Eliminated |
| Ana Crisman | 11 | Harpist | | | | | Eliminated |
| Geoprism | 12 | K-Pop Dance Group | | | | | Eliminated |
| Duo Tela Marinera | 13 | Aerial Duo | | | | | Eliminated |
| Adolfo Masyebra | 14 | Hypnotist Magician | | | | | Eliminated (Lost Judges' Vote) |

==== Semi-final 4 (23 April) ====
The Judges collectively decided that Papa & Neylia deserved a Group Golden Buzzer, therefore only 1 act moved on via public vote, and 1 act moved on via the judges' vote (the judges also had 3 acts to choose from instead of 2).

| Semi-finalist | Order | Performance type | Buzzes and Judges' Votes | | | | Result |
| Semi-finalist | Order | Performance type | Mejide | Edurne | Padilla | Martínez | Result |
|---|---|---|---|---|---|---|---|
| Senmaru | 1 | Novelty Magic Act | | | | | Eliminated |
| Guillermo Gomez | 2 | Rollerskating Dancer | | | | | Eliminated |
| Paupi El Mago | 3 | Horror Magician | | | | | Eliminated |
| Alex Dowis | 4 | Light Painting Act | | | | | Advanced |
| Gisela Quiros | 5 | Singer & Guitarist | | | ^{5} | | Eliminated (Lost Judges' Vote) |
| Enjoy Productions | 6 | Comedy Dance Group | | | | | Eliminated |
| Belen Elvira | 7 | Opera Singer | | | | | Eliminated |
| Albert Infante | 8 | Drag Flamenco Dancer | Buzzed Out | | | | Eliminated |
| Duo Believe | 9 | Pole Aerialists | | | | | Advanced (Won Judges' Vote) |
| Papa & Neylia | 10 | Dance Duo | Live Golden Buzzer | Live Golden Buzzer | Live Golden Buzzer | Live Golden Buzzer | Golden Buzzer Advancement |
| Isama & Miguel | 11 | Accordion Duo | | | | | Eliminated |
| Encarna Garrido | 12 | Archery Act | | | | | Eliminated |
| Rob Delion | 13 | Singer | | | | | Eliminated (Lost Judges' Vote) |
| Manolo Costa & Mindanguillo^{4} | 14 | Comedy Magic Duo | ^{3} | | | | Eliminated |

- ^3 Manolo Costa & Mindanguillo pressed Risto Mejide's buzzer as part of their performance, however he indicated that he would've done so himself regardless.
- ^4 This act also pressed the Golden Buzzer as part of their performance.
- ^5 Despite the majority vote being for Duo Believe, Padilla gave Gisela Quiros a vote for encouragement.

=== Finals summary ===
Buzzed Out | Winner |

==== Grand Final (30 April) ====
| Semi-finalist | Order | Performance type | Buzzes and Judges' Votes | | | | Result |
| Semi-finalist | Order | Performance type | Mejide | Edurne | Padilla | Martínez | Result |
|---|---|---|---|---|---|---|---|
| Cristian Montilla | 1 | Flamenco Singer | | | | | 10th - Eliminated |
| Duo Believe | 2 | Aerialists | | | | | 12th - Eliminated |
| Elsa Tortonda | 3 | Singer | | | | | 3rd Place |
| Alex Dowis | 4 | Light Painting Act | | | | | 7th - Eliminated |
| Maria Cruz | 5 | Flamenco Dancer | | | | | 9th - Eliminated |
| Celia Munoz | 6 | Ventriloquist Singer | | | | | 1st - Winner |
| Santi Marcilla | 7 | Close-Up Magician | | | | | 2nd Place |
| Papa & Neylia | 8 | Dance Duo | | | | | 6th - Eliminated |
| Juan Carlos Martos | 9 | Opera Singer | | | | | 11th - Eliminated |
| Stefanny & Michael | 10 | Dance Duo | | | | | 8th - Eliminated |
| Violincheli Brothers | 11 | String Duo | | | | | 5th - Eliminated |
| Chus Serrano | 12 | Drag Singer | | | | | 4th Place |

== Ratings ==
| Order | Episode | Viewers (millions) | Share |
|---|---|---|---|
| 1 | "Auditions 1" | 2.31 | 14.8% |
| 2 | "Auditions 2" | 2.68 | 17.2% |
| 3 | "Auditions 3" | 2.87 | 18.7% |
| 4 | "Auditions 4" | 2.72 | 18.2% |
| 5 | "Auditions 5" | 2.71 | 18.2% |
| 6 | "Auditions 6" | 2.82 | 19.0% |
| 7 | "Auditions 7" | 2.66 | 19.3% |
| 8 | "Auditions 8" | 2.67 | 19.2% |
| 9 | "Auditions 9" | 2.80 | 20.8% |
| 10 | "Auditions 10" | 2.73 | 20.8% |
| 11 | "Semi-Final 1" | 2.75 | 21.2% |
| 12 | "Road to the Final Special" | 1.58 | 14.5% |
| 13 | "Semi-Final 2" | 2.81 | 20.7% |
| 14 | "Semi-Final 3" | 2.66 | 21.0% |
| 15 | "Semi-Final 4" | 2.69 | 20.9% |
| 16 | "Grand Final" | 3.18 | 25.1% |
