= Hugo Molina =

Spanish musician and drummer

Hugo Molina is a drummer and musician from Spain. He became the youngest ever winner at the age of 2, in 2019 of a general edition of the Got Talent franchise—broadcasting on regular season schedule, and open to performers and auditions at any age and type of act—and together with DJ Arch Jnr from South Africa and Arina Shuhalevych (Арина Шугалевич) of Ukraine, who won a children’s edition of Ukrayina maye talant in 2016 at age of 2, one of the youngest winners of any version of the Got Talent series.

== Career ==
A native of Palos de le Frontera in Spain, a town in the province of Huelva in Andalusia, Molina was self-taught as a drummer from age 1 , which was when he began to learn how to play drums based on videos from YouTube and other sources. Molina’s parents, Manuel Jesús and Cristina, in 2019 entered him on the 5th season of the Telecinco show Got Talent España, Spain’s version of the international Got Talent franchise.

Molina debuted as a 2-year-old drummer, where he was recognized for being skilled enough already to play professionally on percussion instruments beginning with his first televised performance of the parade march “Oh Pecador”, associated with the traditional Semana Santa Easter fiesta. His performance was well received, and he advanced to the semifinals with another acclaimed performance of the march “Presentado a Sevilla”, with the musical accompaniment of a band. Then for the finals, he performed on drums for the popular villancico song “Campana sobre campana”, backed by a choir and again receiving acclamation for his performance.

He was proclaimed the winner of Season 5 after having just turned 3 years old, the youngest for any regular series winner in the Got Talent franchise, and in the highest-rated finals in the Got Talent España show’s history. Molina’s drumming skills as were noted internationally, and he was invited to meet with Pope Francis after Christmas in 2019. He has since then continued to perform, and also to work on other interests such as sports especially football.
