= Greetings Queenlings =

- Canada's Drag Race episode
- Episode no.: Season 5 Episode 2
- Original air date: November 28, 2024

Guest appearances
- Peaches and Sarain Fox (guest judges)

Episode chronology
← Previous "Go Off Queen"	Next → "The Slayoffs: Teams Edition"
- Canada's Drag Race season 5

"Greetings Queenlings" is the second episode of the fifth season of the Canadian reality competition television series Canada's Drag Race, which aired on November 28, 2024 on the television network Crave. In this episode the queens create public service announcements to explain earth to aliens. Feminist musician Peaches and activist Sarain Fox are the guest judges who joins regular panelists Brooke Lynn Hytes and Traci Melchor.

The episode received a Canadian Cinema Editors Award nomination at the 15th annual awards, and a Canadian Screen Award nomination at the 14th Canadian Screen Awards.

== Episode ==
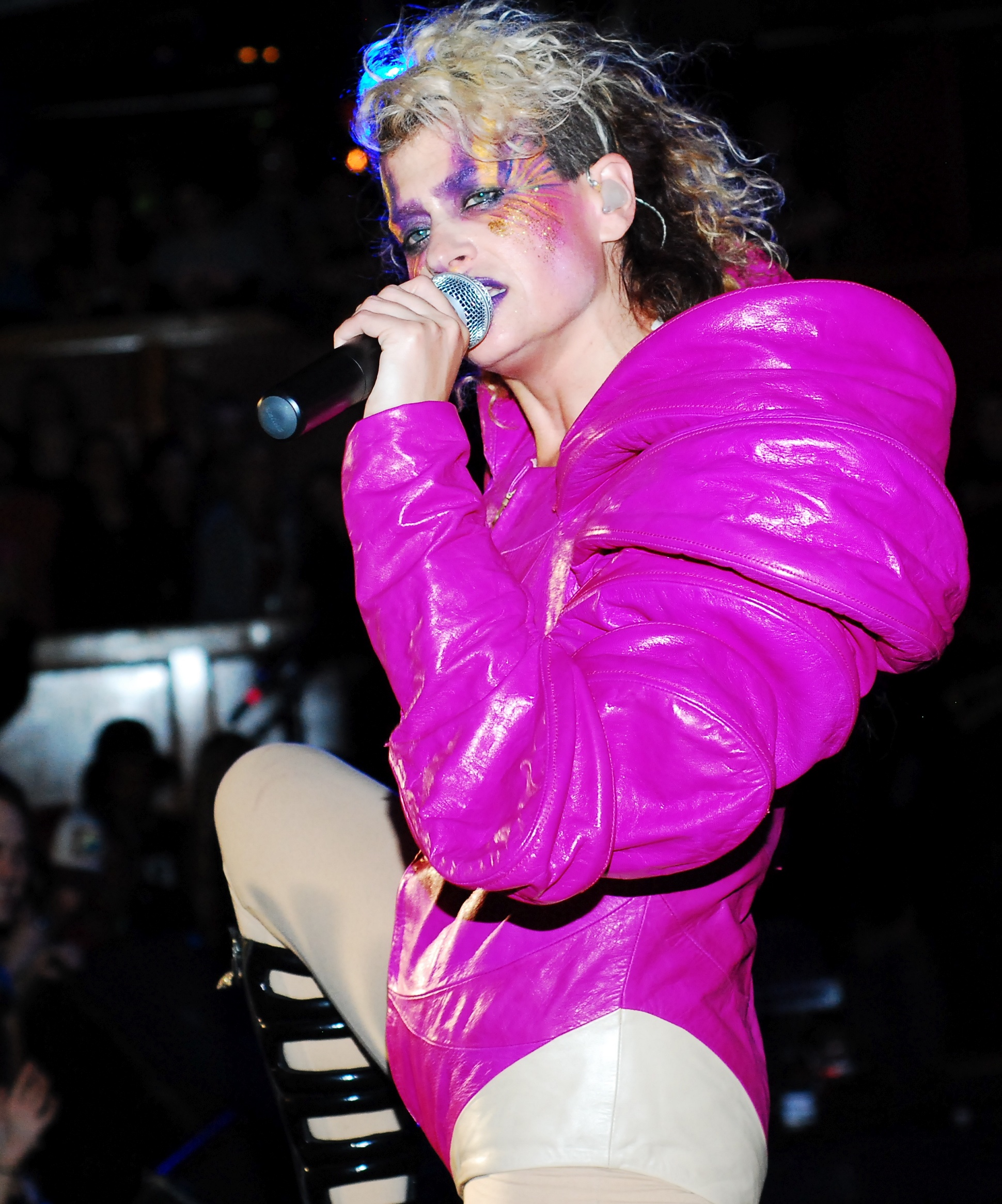
Peaches (pictured in 2009) is one of the guest judges.

The queens return to Untucked and see that the Golden Beaver has returned, a twist introduced the previous season. For the main challenge the contestants will work in groups to write, act in, and direct short instructional videos, or public service announcements, to share what life on Earth is like for aliens. The teams, captained by the three queens who received Thorns in the previous episode, are:

- Team "Family": Tara Nova, Sanjina DaBish Queen, Uma Gahd, and Xana
- Team "Manners": Perla, Helena Poison, and Minhi Wang
- Team "Sexuality": Tiffany Ann Co., Jaylene Tyme, Makayla Couture, and The Virgo Queen

While getting ready for the runway the following day the queens discuss their looks for the runway category, Time and Place. Jaylene Tyme, who is First Nations and Métis, shares that she is a Sixties Scoop survivor, where she was taken from her Indigenous family and raised by settlers. Moved by Jaylene Tyme's story Xana, who is also Métis, shares they also grew up without their Indigenous culture and that that their grandfather was also a Sixties Scoop survivor. Jaylene Tyme then pulls out a piece of regalia, a sash, and gifts it to Xana. She shares that it is for the Métis, and that she thinks "it's important for it to come from me." The Virgo Queen then shared about her background as an Afro-Indigenous person.

On the runway regular panelists Brooke Lynn Hytes and Traci Melchor are joined by guest judges Peaches and Sarain Fox. The runway theme is Time and Place. Helena Poison wears a 1950s-inspired Hell look; Jaylene Tyme presents a regalia look inspired by 1850s Treaty 4 Pow Wow; Makayla Couture has a Caribana Carnival costume; Minhi Wang re-creates Juice Boxx's entrance look from "Eh-laganza Eh-xtravaganza"; Perla does Victorian style 1888 London; Sanjina Dabish Queen does a 1950s Amsterdam Red Light District brothel look; Tara Nova pays homage to Joey Smallwood at Newfoundland and Labrador's entrance to confederation; The Virgo Queen's look is inspired by African royal regalia in the Romantic Era; Tiffany Ann Co.'s by Ancient Vietnam; while Uma Gahd and Xana both do futuristic looks, with Uma Gahd's referencing a post-apocalyptic desert Earth.

Helena Poison, Minhi Wang, and Perla are the best of the week, while Tara Nova, Tiffany Ann Co., and Xana are in the bottom. Perla is declared the winner of the challenge, while Helena Poison and Minhi Wang are safe. Following Untucked Perla chooses to use the Golden Beaver to save Xana from elimination. Tara Nova and Tiffany Ann Co. then lip sync to "Fuck The Pain Away" by Peaches. Tiffany Ann Co. wins the lip sync, and Tara Nova is eliminated.

== Aftermath ==
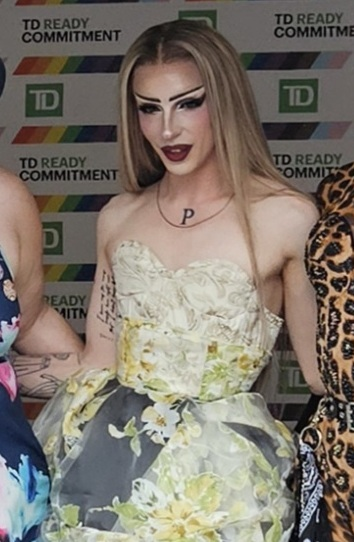
Perla (pictured in 2025) wins the maxi challenge.

The conversation between Jaylene Tyme, Xana, and The Virgo Queen went viral on social media following the episode, with a clip on TikTok getting over 7 million views and over 1 million likes, and over 6 million views on other platforms. Kevin O'Keeffe, writing for Xtra Magazine, described the moment as "tremendous and heart-wrenching." Brett White, writing for Pop Heist, called it "one of the most powerful moments...on any Drag Race [series]."

In an interview with the Missinipi Broadcasting Corporation The Virgo Queen described the moment as an "out-of-body experience", with Xana saying "sharing that medicine was...impactful not only to me but...Indigenous folks...[and] anybody who may be mixed race or BIPOC in any country who may not feel connected to their culture." In an interview with Pop Heist Jaylene Tyme defined it as Spirit, saying "the Spirit just kind of came over me."

=== Awards ===
In March 2025 Beth Biederman received a nomination for a Canadian Cinema Editors Award for Best Editing in Competition/Reality for her work on the episode. In March 2026 Kirsten Klontz received a Canadian Screen Award nomination for Best Achievement in Hair at the 14th Canadian Screen Awards, with the results to be announced on May 31, 2026.
