= List of Canada's Drag Race contestants =

Canada's Drag Race is a Canadian reality competition television series where drag queen Brooke Lynn Hytes, as host and head judge, is in search of the "Next Drag Superstar" for Canada. It first broadcast in 2020 with six complete seasons aired. During each season, drag performers apply to compete against each other through unique challenges. Based on the critiques given from the judges, they are progressively eliminated via a lip-sync contest, until only a few contenders remain. The selected finalists participate in a last episode from which a winner is determined to be given the title and any monetary prizes.

Since its sixth season, 79 contestants were selected by production and have competed so far. The six winners of the series, in chronological order, are Priyanka, Icesis Couture, Gisèle Lullaby, Venus, The Virgo Queen, and Van Goth. As of 2026, three of those winners had represented for their hometown: Toronto, Ontario.

== Winners ==
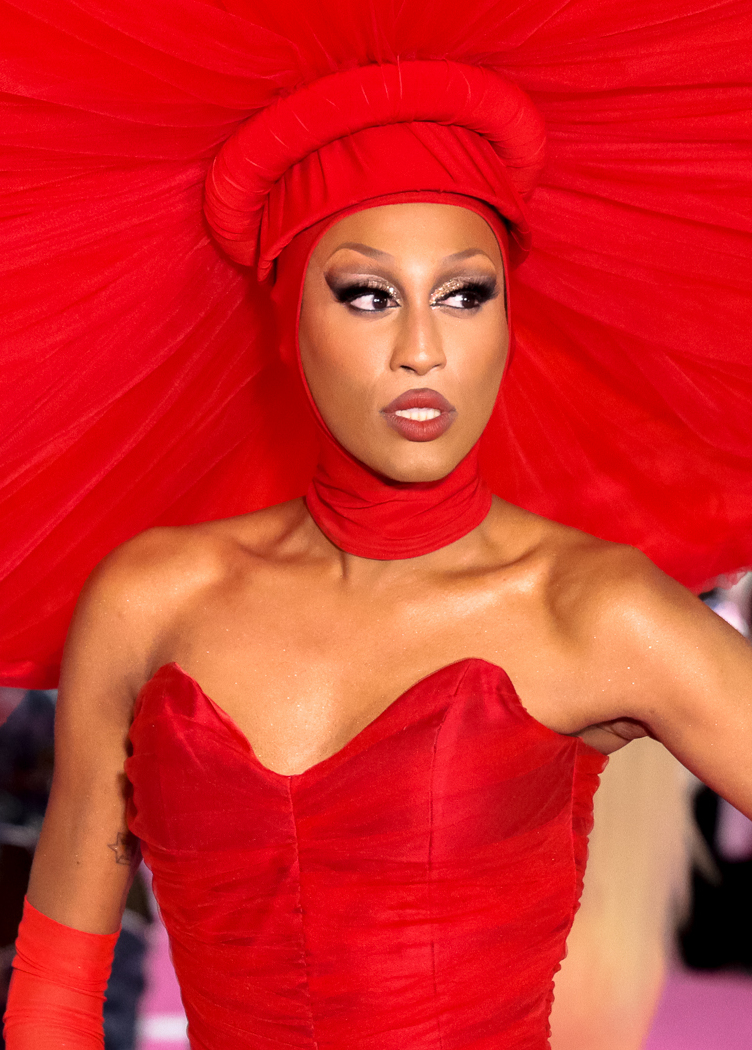
Season 1 winner
Priyanka

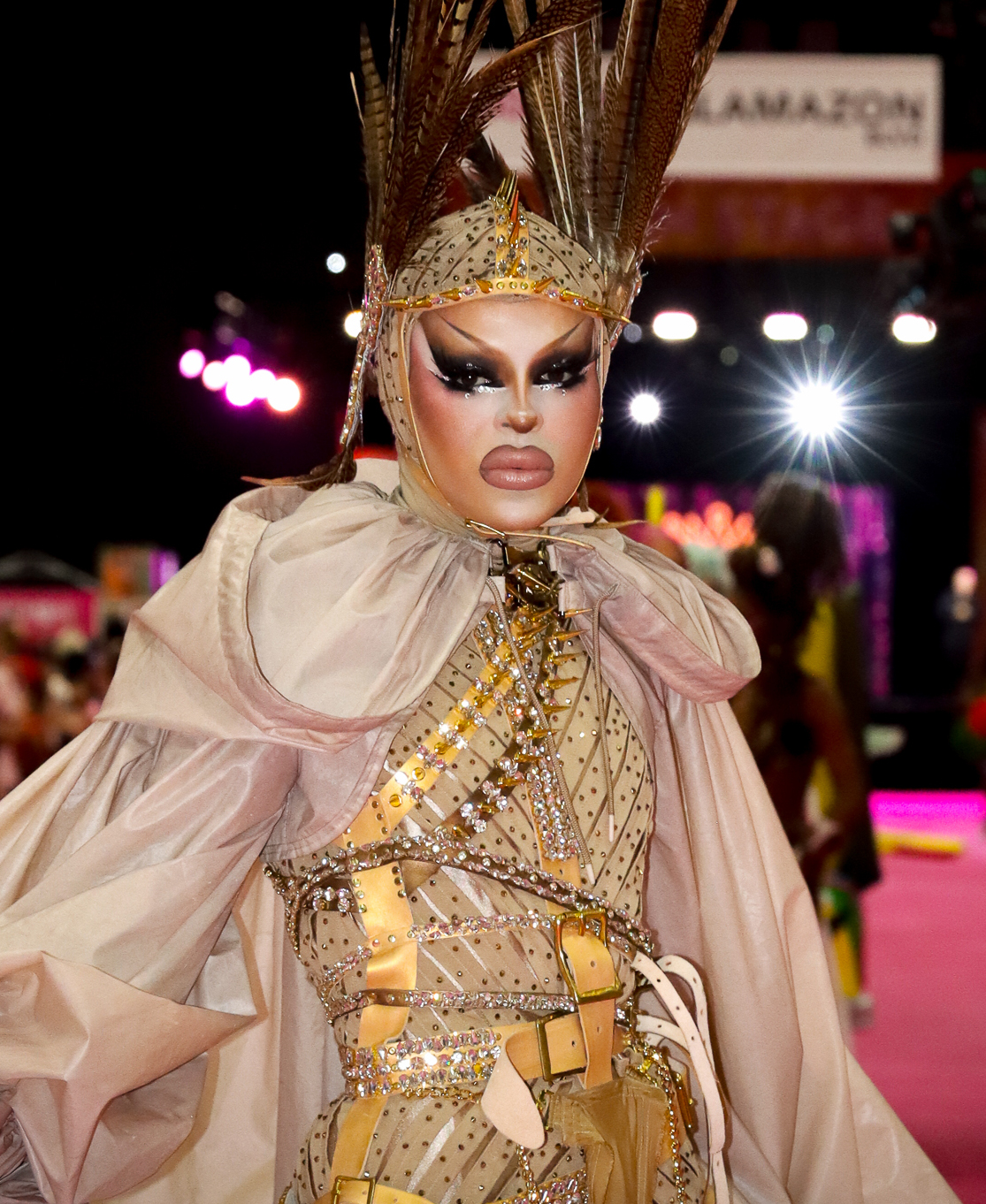
Season 2 winner
Icesis Couture

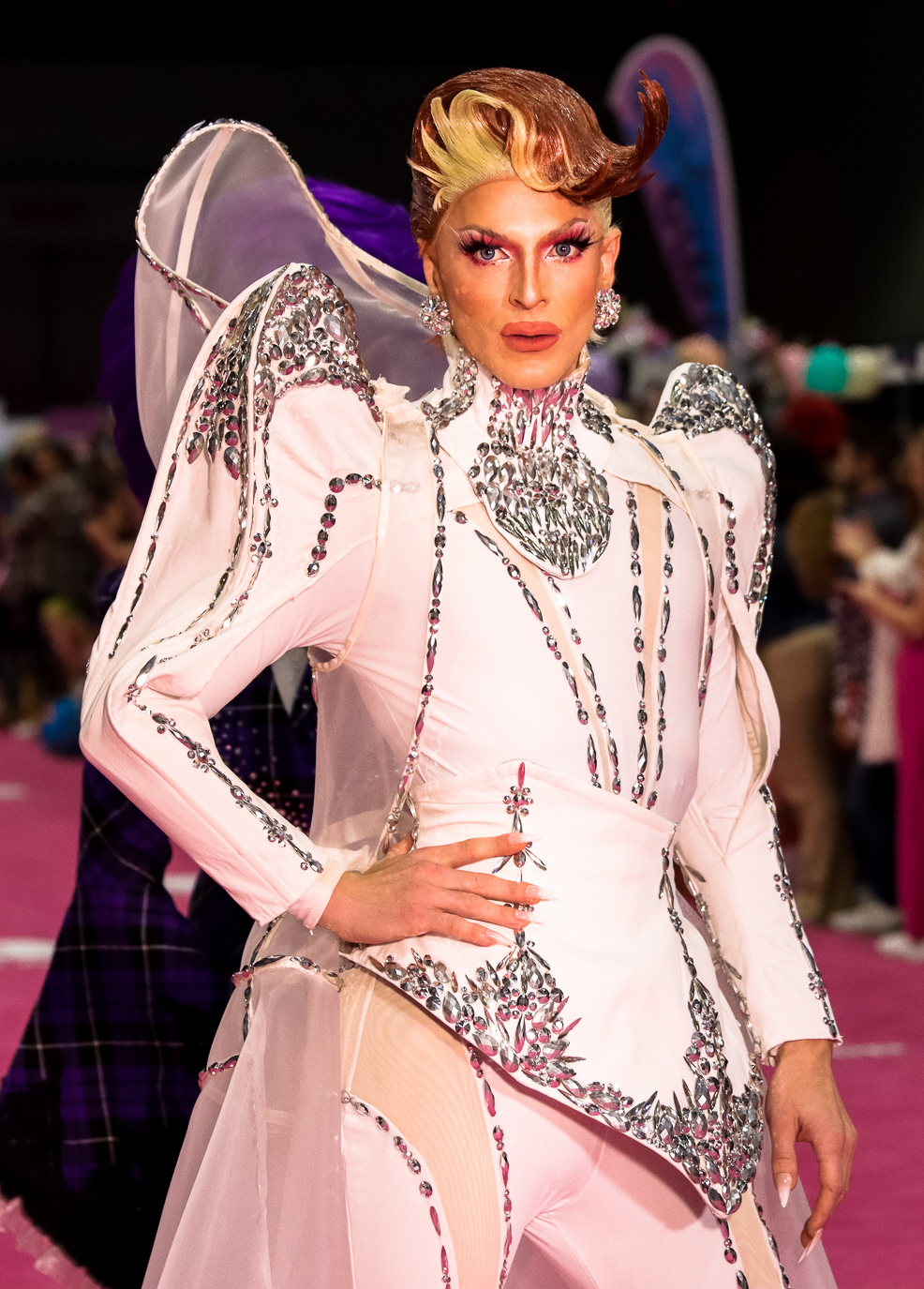
Season 3 winner
Gisèle Lullaby

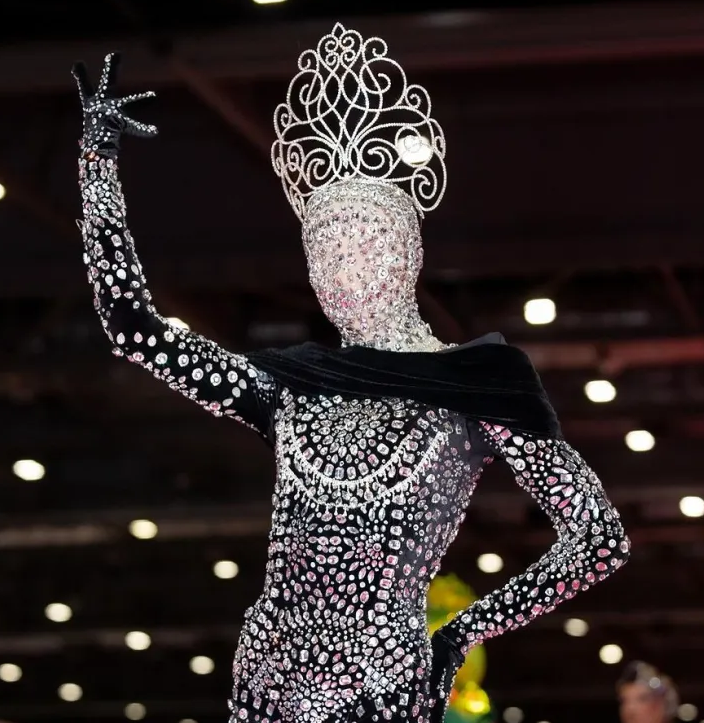
Season 4 winner
Venus

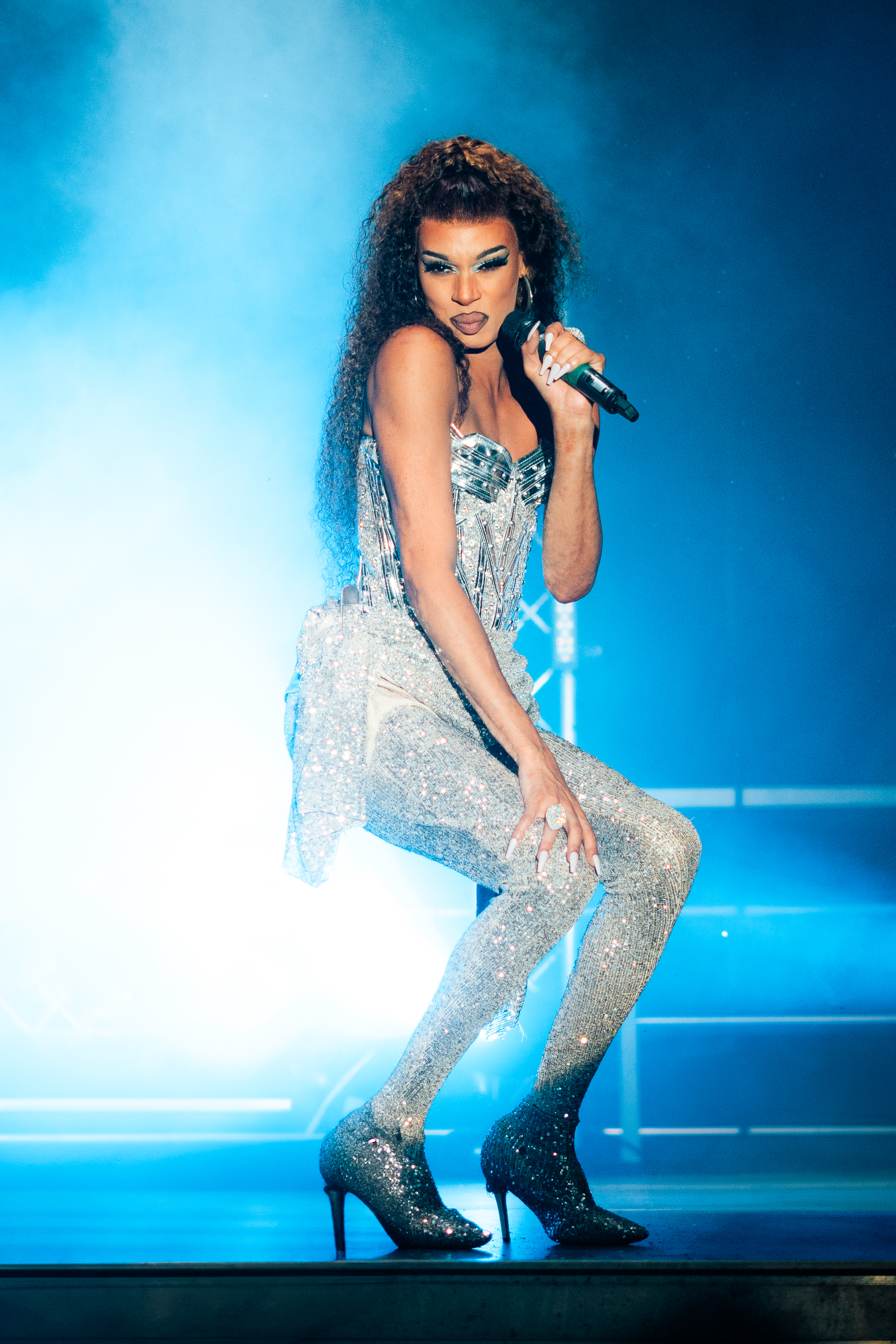
Season 5 winner
The Virgo Queen

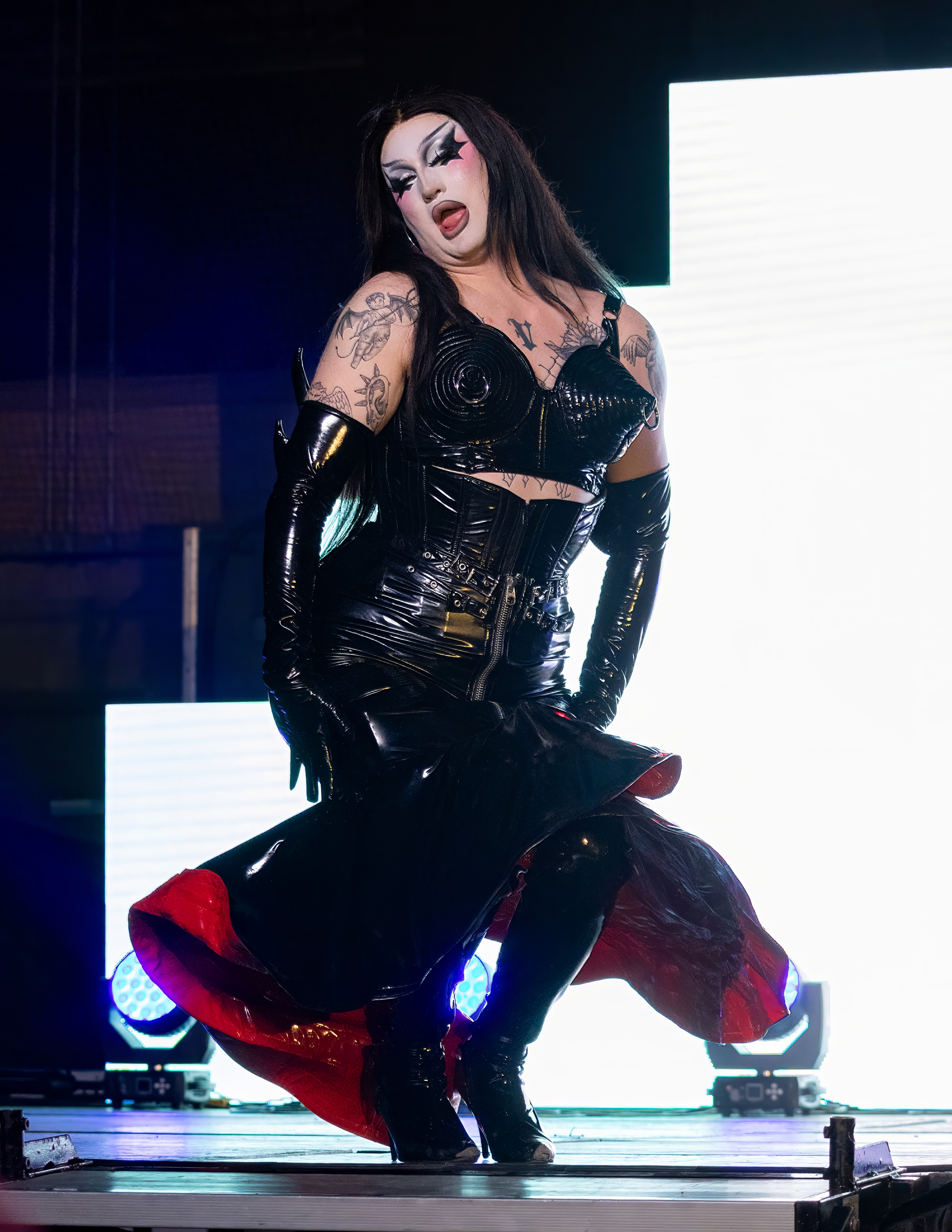
Season 6 winner
Van Goth

== Contestants ==
Legend:
| Contestant won the season. |
| Contestant was saved from elimination. |
| Contestant returned to competition after being eliminated during the season. |
| Contestant returned to competition after being eliminated in previous season. |
| Contestant was voted as Miss Congeniality of the season. |

Canada's Drag Race contestants and their backgrounds (Note: All ages, names, with hometowns, and outcome are stated at time of filming.)
| Season | Contestant | Age | Hometown | Outcome |
|---|---|---|---|---|
| 1 | Priyanka | 28 | Toronto, Ontario | Winner |
| 1 | Rita Baga | 32 | Montreal, Quebec | Runners-up |
| 1 | Scarlett BoBo | 29 | Toronto, Ontario | Runners-up |
| 1 | Jimbo | 36 | Victoria, British Columbia | 4th |
| 1 | Lemon | 23 | New York City, United States | 5th |
| 1 | Ilona Verley | 24 | Vancouver, British Columbia | 6th |
| 1 | BOA | 24 | Windsor, Ontario | 7th |
| 1 | Kiara | 22 | Montreal, Quebec | 8th |
| 1 | Tynomi Banks | 37 | Toronto, Ontario | 9th |
| 1 | Anastarzia Anaquway | 37 | East York, Ontario | 10th |
| 1 | Kyne | 21 | Kitchener-Waterloo, Ontario | 11th |
| 1 | Juice Boxx | 31 | Essex, Ontario | 12th |
| 2 | Icesis Couture | 34 | Ottawa, Ontario | Winner |
| 2 | Kendall Gender | 30 | Vancouver, British Columbia | Runners-up |
| 2 | Pythia | 26 | Montreal, Quebec | Runners-up |
| 2 | Gia Metric | 29 | Vancouver, British Columbia | 4th |
| 2 | Adriana | 29 | Quebec City, Quebec | 5th |
| 2 | Kimora Amour | 34 | Toronto, Ontario | 6th |
| 2 | Synthia Kiss | 29 | Vancouver, British Columbia | 7th |
| 2 | Eve 6000 | 29 | Toronto, Ontario | 8th |
| 2 | Suki Doll | 27 | Montreal, Quebec | 9th |
| 2 | Stephanie Prince | 24 | Calgary, Alberta | 10th |
| 2 | Océane Aqua-Black | 35 | Montreal, Quebec | 11th |
| 2 | Beth | 24 | Vancouver, British Columbia | 12th |
| 3 | Gisèle Lullaby | 33 | Montreal, Quebec | Winner |
| 3 | Jada Shada Hudson | 37 | Toronto, Ontario | Runner-up |
| 3 | Kimmy Couture | 25 | Ottawa, Ontario | 3rd |
| 3 | Miss Fiercalicious | 25 | Toronto, Ontario | 3rd |
| 3 | Vivian Vanderpuss | 29 | Victoria, British Columbia | 5th |
| 3 | Irma Gerd | 32 | St. John's, Newfoundland and Labrador | 6th |
| 3 | Bombae | 29 | Toronto, Ontario | 7th |
| 3 | Lady Boom Boom | 25 | Montreal, Quebec | 8th |
| 3 | Kaos | 27 | Calgary, Alberta | 9th |
| 3 | Chelazon Leroux | 22 | Saskatoon, Saskatchewan | 10th |
| 3 | Miss Moço | 35 | Toronto, Ontario | 11th |
| 3 | Halal Bae | 33 | Toronto, Ontario | 12th |
| 4 | Venus | 27 | Vancouver, British Columbia | Winner |
| 4 | Aurora Matrix | 23 | Toronto, Ontario | Runner-up |
| 4 | Denim | 24 | Montreal, Quebec | 3rd |
| 4 | Nearah Nuff | 22 | Calgary, Alberta | 3rd |
| 4 | Melinda Verga | 44 | Edmonton, Alberta | 5th |
| 4 | Kiki Coe | 35 | Ottawa, Ontario | 6th |
| 4 | Aimee Yonce Shennel | 31 | Ottawa, Ontario | 7th |
| 4 | Kitten Kaboodle | 57 | Toronto, Ontario | 7th |
| 4 | Luna DuBois | 24 | Toronto, Ontario | 9th |
| 4 | The Girlfriend Experience | 31 | Vancouver, British Columbia | 10th |
| 4 | Sisi Superstar | 31 | Montreal, Quebec | 11th |
| 5 | The Virgo Queen | 25 | Toronto, Ontario | Winner |
| 5 | Makayla Couture | 21 | Toronto, Ontario | Runner-up |
| 5 | Helena Poison | 32 | Toronto, Ontario | 3rd |
| 5 | Minhi Wang | 39 | Toronto, Ontario | 3rd |
| 5 | Perla | 29 | Toronto, Ontario | 5th |
| 5 | Xana | 26 | Vancouver, British Columbia | 6th |
| 5 | Uma Gahd | 36 | Montreal, Quebec | 7th |
| 5 | Jaylene Tyme | 52 | Vancouver, British Columbia | 8th |
| 5 | Sanjina DaBish Queen | 32 | Toronto, Ontario | 9th |
| 5 | Tiffany Ann Co. | 32 | Vancouver, British Columbia | 10th |
| 5 | Tara Nova | 23 | St. John's, Newfoundland and Labrador | 11th |
| 6 | Van Goth | 27 | Toronto, Ontario | Winner |
| 6 | Eboni La'Belle | 24 | St. Catharines, Ontario | Runner-up |
| 6 | PM | 31 | Vancouver, British Columbia | 3rd |
| 6 | Sami Landri | 26 | Moncton, New Brunswick | 3rd (Note: Sami Landri won the Shark Fan Favourite award.) |
| 6 | Karamilk | 25 | Toronto, Ontario | 5th |
| 6 | Saltina Shaker | 29 | Ottawa, Ontario | 6th |
| 6 | Mya Foxx | 31 | Halifax, Nova Scotia | 7th |
| 6 | Velma Jones (Note: Also referred to as Johnny Jones when in their drag king persona.) | 39 | Montreal, Quebec | 7th |
| 6 | Dulce | 24 | London, Ontario | 9th |
| 6 | Hazel | 27 | Vancouver, British Columbia | 10th |
| 6 | Star Doll | 25 | Toronto, Ontario | 11th |
| 6 | Paolo Perfección | 25 | Montreal, Quebec | 12th |
| 7 | Batty Banks | 31 | Vancouver, British Colombia | TBA |
| 7 | Bliss | 25 | Vancouver, British Colombia | TBA |
| 7 | Carlotta Carlisle | 38 | Deer Lake, Newfoundland and Labrador | TBA |
| 7 | Chiquita Mére | 31 | Shediac, New Brunswick | TBA |
| 7 | Gravy | 22 | St. John's, Newfoundland and Labrador | TBA |
| 7 | Guy Anabella | 34 | Toronto, Ontario | TBA |
| 7 | Kara Juku | 31 | Vancouver, British Colombia | TBA |
| 7 | Madee Lovegood | 30 | Toronto, Ontario | TBA |
| 7 | Moh Dafok | 36 | Montreal, Quebec | TBA |
| 7 | Paolo Perfección | 26 | Montreal, Quebec | TBA |
| 7 | Paris Matik | 24 | Toronto, Ontario | TBA |
| 7 | Pheromone Killz | 30 | Edmonton, Alberta | TBA |
