= Go Off Queen =

- Canada's Drag Race episode
- Episode no.: Season 5 Episode 1
- Original air date: November 21, 2024

Guest appearance
- Lu Kala (guest judge)

Episode chronology
← Previous "Grand Finale"	Next → "Greetings Queenlings"
- Canada's Drag Race season 5

"Go Off Queen" is the first episode of the fifth season of the Canadian reality competition television series Canada's Drag Race, which aired on November 21, 2024 on the television network Crave. In this episode the queens compete to earn one of three 'rosebuds' and leave a first impression with their entrance looks, performances, and runway looks. Singer Lu Kala is the guest judge who joins regular panelists Brooke Lynn Hytes, Brad Goreski and Traci Melchor.

The episode received a Canadian Cinema Editors Award nomination at the 15th annual awards in March 2025, and six nominations at the 14th Canadian Screen Awards, set to be presented on May 31, 2026.

== Episode ==
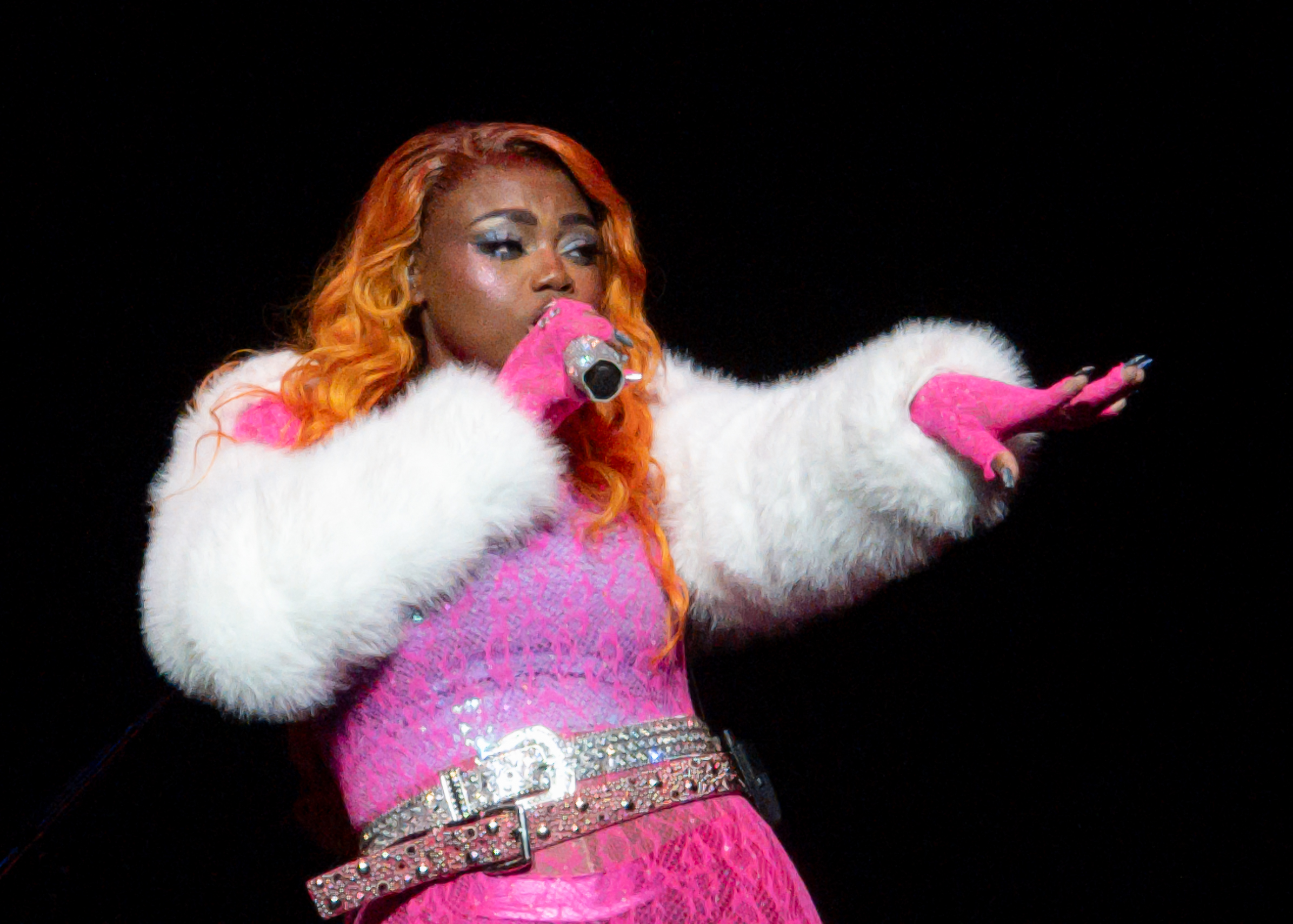
Lu Kala (pictured in 2025) is the guest judge.

The episode begins with eleven new queens entering the workroom for the first time. They are Minhi Wang from Toronto, who was previously a member of the Pit Crew on season 1; Tara Nova from St. John's, Newfoundland and Labrador; Sanjina DaBish Queen from Toronto; Perla from Toronto; Helena Poison from Toronto; Jaylene Tyme from Vancouver; The Virgo Queen from Toronto; Uma Gahd from Montreal; Tiffany Ann Co. from Vancouver; Xana from Vancouver; and Makayla Couture from Toronto, who is the drag daughter of Icesis Couture and previously appeared as Icesis Couture's makeover on the season 2 episode "Prom".

Brooke Lynn Hytes tells the queens that the maxi challenge has already began and that there are three rosebuds available, similar to last season's premiere, but the queen's who receive them will be in the top for the week. Additionally, there are three 'thorns' available for the bottom performers of the week. The queens then need to record verses and perform them in a music video for the song "Go Off Queen" featuring Brooke Lynn Hytes.

In the workroom while the queens get ready for the runway Tara Nova talks about how Velvet, the only LGBTQ bar in St. John's, only paid drag performers $37.50 per show.

On the runway regular panelists Brooke Lynn Hytes, Brad Goreski and Traci Melchor are joined by guest judge Lu Kala. The queens then present their looks for the category "You Oughta Know... Me" on the mainstage, a reference to the Alanis Morissette song "You Oughta Know". The first rosebud is awarded to Jaylene Tyme for her entrance look, the second to Makayla Couture for her music video performance, and the third to The Virgo Queen for her "You Oughta Know... Me" look. Tara Nova receives a thorn for her entrance look, Perla for her music video performance, and Tiffany Ann Co. for her "You Oughta Know... Me" look. The other queens are declared safe.

Following deliberation and Untucked the bottom queens are declared safe and that no one will be going home. Jaylene Tyme is then called safe, leaving Makayla Couture and The Virgo Queen as the top two queens of the week. They lip sync to "Pretty Girl Era" by guest judge Lu Kala, with The Virgo Queen winning the lip sync and a $5,000.00 tip.

== Production ==
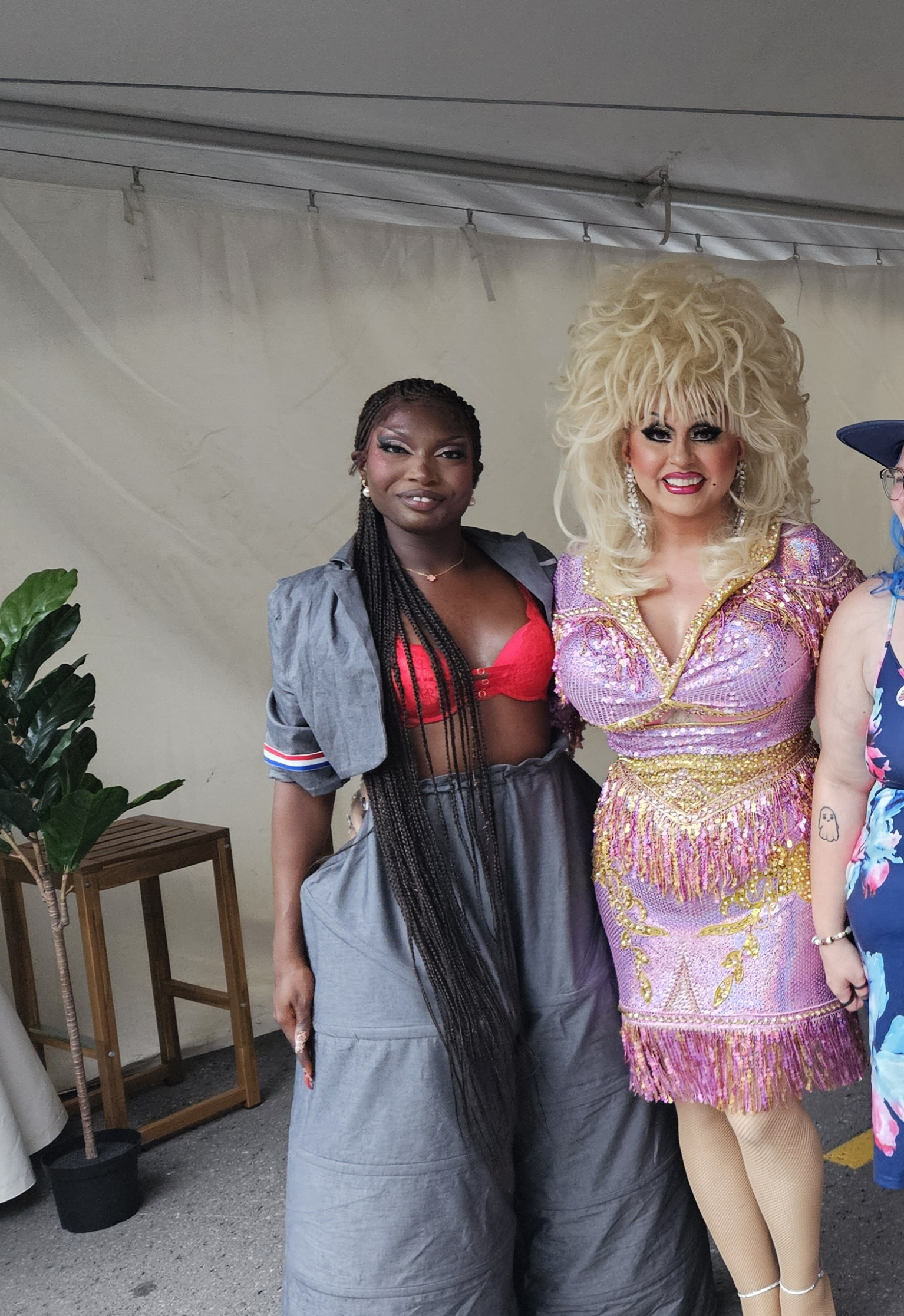
Jaylene Tyme and Makayla Couture (pictured in 2025) each receive a rosebud for their performances in the episode.

The episode originally aired on Crave on November 21, 2024, becoming available for streaming following.

=== Music ===
The song "Go Off Queen" by the Cast of Canada's Drag Race and Brooke Lynn Hytes was released by World of Wonder Productions for streaming and download on November 19, 2024, two days before the episode aired. The music video was also released on the Canada's Drag Race YouTube page "Drag Race on Crave" the same date.

=== Fashion ===
Jaylene Tyme's entrance look, which won her the first rosebud of the episode, pays tribute to Missing and Murdered Indigenous Women, Girls, and Two-Spirit People. The MMIWG movement was previously given a tribute on the Canada's Drag Race season 1 episode "U Wear It Well" when Ilona Verley incorporated the red handprints into her Coronation Eleganza look.

== Aftermath and reception ==
Following the airing of the episode and the queens discussion of pay rates for drag performers in St. John's the bar cancelled all following Canada's Drag Race viewing parties. The bar also pledged to ensure improved compensation for performers.

=== Awards ===
In March 2025 Peter Topalovic was nominated for a Canadian Cinema Editors Award in the category Best Editing in Competition / Reality at the 15th Canadian Cinema Editors Awards for his work on the episode.

On March 25, 2026 the nominations for the 14th Canadian Screen Awards were announced, with the results to be presented on May 31, 2026. The episode received a total of six nominations, the most for an episode of Canada's Drag Race. These are for Best Direction, Reality/Competition for Shelagh O'Brien; Best Writing, Lifestyle or Reality/Competition for Brandon Ash-Mohammed, Trevor Boris, Spencer Fritz, and Jake Benaim; Best Picture Editing, Reality/Competition for Peter Topalovic; Best Sound, Lifestyle, Reality, or Entertainment for John Diemer, Scott Brachmayer, Rosie Eberhard, Levi Linton, Dane Kelly, Rob Taylor, Eric Leigh, and Alastair Sims; Best Production Design or Art Direction, Non-Fiction for Andrew Kinsella and Tara Smith; and Best Casting, Non-Fiction for Heather Muir.
