= List of awards and nominations received by Canada's Drag Race =

Canada's Drag Race
Awards and nominations
Award	Wins	Nominations
American Reality Television Awards	0	1
Canadian Cinema Editors Awards	1	6
Canadian Screen Awards	42	65
Canadian Sync Awards	0	3
Indiescreen Awards	0	1

Totals (Note: Certain award groups do not simply award one winner. They acknowledge several different recipients, have runners-up, and have third place. Since this is a specific recognition and is different from losing an award, runner-up mentions are considered wins in this award tally. For simplification and to avoid errors, each award in this list has been presumed to have had a prior nomination.)
- Wins: 43
- Nominations: 76

The Canadian franchise of Drag Race began in 2020 with Canada's Drag Race, a spin-off of the American drag reality competition series RuPaul's Drag Race. The franchise has grown with two additional series, with Canada's Drag Race: Canada vs. the World in 2022 and Slaycation in 2024. A fourth series, Canada's Drag Race All Stars, is expected to premiere in 2026. The Canadian franchise has the largest number of series in the Drag Race franchise outside of the United States.

The franchise has received 43 awards from a total of 76 nominations, making it the most awarded edition of Drag Race outside of the United States. All three series have received nominations across various awards, with both Canada's Drag Race and Canada's Drag Race: Canada vs. the World winning multiple times. These awards notably include 42 Canadian Screen Awards, the highest level of film and television awards in Canada.

== American Reality Television Awards ==
The American Reality Television Awards are presented by the Academy for Reality Television for reality television in the United States. Canada's Drag Race has received one nomination.

Canada's Drag Race franchise wins and nominations at the American Reality Television Awards
Year	Category	Nominees	Result	Ref.
2021	International Reality Series	Canada's Drag Race (season 1)	Nominated	

== Canadian Cinema Editors Awards ==
The Canadian Cinema Editors Awards are presented by the Canadian Cinema Editors for editing in film and television. Canada's Drag Race has won once from a total of 6 nominations, with the win and two nominations for Canada's Drag Race: Canada vs. the World.

Canada's Drag Race franchise wins and nominations at the Canadian Cinema Editors Awards
Year	Category	Nominees	Result	Ref.
2023	Best Editing in Lifestyle/Competition/Reality	Jonathan Dowler, "Grand Finale" - Canada's Drag Race: Canada vs. the World	Won	
2024	Best Editing in Lifestyle/Competition/Reality	Jonathan Dowler, "Snatch Game"	Nominated	
2024	Best Editing in Lifestyle/Competition/Reality	Lindsay Ragone, "From Drags to Riches: The Rusical"	Nominated	
2025	Best Editing in Competition / Reality	Beth Biederman, "Greetings Queenlings"	Nominated	
2025	Best Editing in Competition / Reality	Kailey Birk, "Reading Battles" - Canada's Drag Race: Canada vs. the World	Nominated	
2025	Best Editing in Competition / Reality	Peter Topalovic, "Go Off Queen"	Nominated	
2026	Best Editing in Competition / Reality	Kailey Birk, "The Shade"	Nominated	

== Canadian Screen Awards ==
The Canadian Screen Awards are presented by the Academy of Canadian Cinema & Television for film, television, and digital media. Canada's Drag Race has received 34 awards from a total of 65 nominations, with 8 wins and 14 nominations for Canada's Drag Race: Canada vs. the World.

The franchise has won Best Reality/Competition Program or Series four times, and has won every award for Best Host or Presenter in Factual or Reality/Competition since its first nomination in 2021. Heather Muir has also won every award for Best Casting, Non-Fiction since the award's introduction in 2022.

Canada's Drag Race franchise wins and nominations at the Canadian Screen Awards
Year	Category	Nominees	Result	Ref.
2021	Best Reality/Competition Program or Series	Michael Kot, Laura Michalchyshyn, Betty Orr, Mike Bickerton, Pam McNair, RuPaul Charles, Fenton Bailey, Randy Barbato, Tom Campbell, Randy Lennox, Tracey Pearce (season 1)	Won	
2021	Best Host or Presenter in Factual or Reality/Competition	Jeffrey Bowyer-Chapman, Brooke Lynn Hytes, Stacey McKenzie (season 1)	Won	
2021	Best Casting	Heather Muir (season 1)	Nominated	
2021	Best Direction in a Reality/Competition Series	Shelagh O'Brien — "U Wear It Well"	Won	
2021	Best Writing in a Reality/Competition Series	Mike Bickerton, Elvira Kurt, Jen Markowitz — "Welcome to the Family"	Won	
2021	Best Sound in a Non-Fiction Series	John Diemer, Scott Brachmeyer, Daniel Hewett, Dane Kelly, Sarah Labadie, Carlo Scrignaro, Rob Taylor — "U Wear It Well"	Nominated	
2021	Best Production Design or Art Direction in a Non-Fiction Series	Peter Faragher — "Eh-Laganza Eh-Xtravaganza"	Won	
2021	Best Supporting Performance in a Web Program or Series	Priyanka — Drag Ball	Nominated	
2021	Best Host in a Web Program or Series	Traci Melchor — Drag Ball	Nominated	
2021	Audience Choice Award	Priyanka (season 1)	Nominated	
2022	Best Reality/Competition Program or Series	Pam McNair, Betty Orr, Trevor Boris, Laura Michalshyshyn, Michael Kot, Fenton Bailey, Randy Barbato, Tom Campbell, RuPaul Charles, Justin Stockman, Jen Markowitz, Spencer Fritz (season 2)	Won	
2022	Best Variety or Entertainment Special	Manny Groneveldt, John Simpson, Natalie Lambert, Marcelle Edwards — Canada’s Drag Race Anniversary Extravaganza	Won	
2022	Best Direction, Reality/Competition	Shelagh O’Brien — "Under the Big Top"	Won	
2022	Best Writing, Lifestyle or Reality/Competition	Brandon Ash-Mohammed — "Screech"	Won	
2022	Best Picture Editing, Reality/Competition	Lindsay Ragone — "Screech"	Nominated	
2022	Best Picture Editing, Reality/Competition	Baun Mah — "The Snatch Game"	Won	
2022	Best Picture Editing, Reality/Competition	Peter Topalovic — "Under the Big Top"	Nominated	
2022	Best Sound, Non-Fiction	John Diemer, Rob Taylor, Phil Nagy, Eric Leigh, Dane Kelly, Sarah Labadie — "Under the Big Top"	Nominated	
2022	Best Casting, Non-Fiction	Heather Muir (season 2)	Won	
2022	Best Host or Presenter, Factual or Reality/Competition	Brooke Lynn Hytes, Traci Melchor, Amanda Brugel, Brad Goreski (season 2)	Won	
2022	Cogeco Fund Audience Choice	Canada's Drag Race (season 2)	Nominated	
2023	Best Reality/Competition Program or Series	Trevor Boris, Michelle Mama, Yette Vandendam, Betty Orr, Laura Michalchyshyn, Michael Kot, Justin Stockman, Fenton Bailey, Randy Barbato, Tom Campbell, RuPaul Charles, Spencer Fritz (season 3)	Nominated	
2023	Best Direction, Reality/Competition	Shelagh O'Brien — "Squirrels Trip: The Rusical"	Won	
2023	Best Writing, Lifestyle or Reality/Competition	Brandon Ash-Mohammed, Trevor Boris, Spencer Fritz, Kevin Hazlehurst — "Squirrels Trip: The Rusical"	Won	
2023	Best Picture Editing, Reality/Competition	Lindsay Ragone — "Masquerade Ball"	Nominated	
2023	Best Picture Editing, Reality/Competition	Peter Topalovic — "Sidewalk to Catwalk"	Nominated	
2023	Best Sound, Lifestyle, Reality or Entertainment	John Diemer, Scott Brachmayer, Rosie Eberhard, Levi Linton, Rob Taylor, Alastair Sims, Eric Leigh — "Squirrels Trip: The Rusical"	Won	
2023	Best Production Design or Art Direction, Non-Fiction	Andrew Kinsella — "Sidewalk to Catwalk"	Won	
2023	Best Casting, Non-Fiction	Heather Muir (season 3)	Won	
2023	Best Host or Presenter, Factual or Reality/Competition	Brooke Lynn Hytes, Traci Melchor, Brad Goreski (season 3)	Won	
2023	Cogeco Fund Audience Choice	Canada's Drag Race (season 3)	Nominated	
2024	Best Reality/Competition Program or Series	Trevor Boris, Michelle Mama, Yette Vandendam, Betty Orr, Laura Michalchyshyn, Michael Kot, Justin Stockman, Fenton Bailey, Randy Barbato, Tom Campbell, RuPaul Charles, Spencer Fritz - Canada's Drag Race: Canada vs. the World (season 1)	Won	
2024	Best Host or Presenter, Factual or Reality/Competition	Brooke Lynn Hytes, Brad Goreski, Traci Melchor - Canada's Drag Race: Canada vs. the World (season 1)	Won	
2024	Best Casting, Non-Fiction	Heather Muir - Canada's Drag Race: Canada vs. the World (season 1)	Won	
2024	Best Picture Editing, Reality/Competition	Jonathan Dowler, "Grand Finale" - Canada's Drag Race: Canada vs. the World	Won	
2024	Best Picture Editing, Reality/Competition	Kyle Power, "Comedy Queens" - Canada's Drag Race: Canada vs. the World	Nominated	
2024	Best Sound Editing, Lifestyle or Reality/Competition	John Diemer, Scott Brachmayer, Rosie Eberhard, Levi Linton, Rob Taylor, Eric Leigh and Alastair Sims, "Bonjour Hi" - Canada's Drag Race: Canada vs. the World	Won	
2024	Best Direction, Reality/Competition	Shelagh O'Brien, "Bonjour Hi" - Canada's Drag Race: Canada vs. the World	Won	
2024	Best Writing, Lifestyle or Reality/Competition	Brandon Ash-Mohammed, Trevor Boris, Spencer Fritz and Kevin Hazlehurst, "Spy Queens" - Canada's Drag Race: Canada vs. the World	Won	
2024	Cogeco Fund Audience Choice	Canada's Drag Race: Canada vs. the World (season 1)	Nominated	
2025	Best Reality/Competition Program or Series	Trevor Boris, Yette Vandendam, Betty Orr, Laura Michalchyshyn, Michael Kot, Justin Stockman, Fenton Bailey, Randy Barbato, Tom Campbell, RuPaul Charles, Spencer Fritz, Brett Ashley, Tomás Maturana (season 4)	Won	
2025	Best Direction, Reality/Competition	Shelagh O’Brien, "Premiere Ball"	Won	
2025	Best Direction, Reality/Competition	Shelagh O’Brien, "Snatch Game: The Rusical" - Canada's Drag Race: Canada vs. the World	Nominated	
2025	Best Writing, Lifestyle or Reality/Competition	Brandon Ash Mohammed, Trevor Boris, Spencer Fritz, "From Drags to Riches: The Rusical"	Won	
2025	Best Writing, Lifestyle or Reality/Competition	Brandon Ash Mohammed, Trevor Boris, Spencer Fritz, "Snatch Game: The Rusical" - Canada's Drag Race: Canada vs. the World	Nominated	
2025	Best Photography, Lifestyle or Reality/Competition	Joey Sadler, "Snatch Game: The Rusical" - Canada's Drag Race: Canada vs. the World	Nominated	
2025	Best Sound, Lifestyle, Reality, or Entertainment	John Diemer, Scott Brachmayer, Rosie Eberhard, Levi Linton, Rob Taylor, Eric Leigh, Alastair Sims, "Premiere Ball"	Nominated	
2025	Best Sound, Lifestyle, Reality, or Entertainment	John Diemer, Scott Brachmayer, Rosie Eberhard, Levi Linton, Dane Kelly, Rob Taylor, Eric Leigh, Alastair Sims, "Snatch Game: The Rusical" - Canada's Drag Race: Canada vs. the World	Won	
2025	Best Production Design or Art Direction, Non-fiction	Andrew Kinsella, Tara Smith, "Premiere Ball"	Won	
2025	Best Production Design or Art Direction, Non-fiction	Andrew Kinsella, Tara Smith, "The Hole" - Canada's Drag Race: Canada vs. the World	Nominated	
2025	Best Achievement in Make-up	Viktor Peters, "From Drags to Riches: The Rusical"	Won	
2025	Best Achievement in Hair	Kirsten Klontz, "A Star is Born"	Won	
2025	Best Casting, Non-fiction	Heather Muir (season 4)	Won	
2025	Best Host or Presenter, Factual or Reality/Competition	Brooke Lynn Hytes, Brad Goreski, Traci Melchor (season 4)	Won	
2026	Best Reality/Competition Program or Series	Trevor Boris, Lori Greenberg, Matthew Hornburg, Mark J.W. Bishop, Laura Michalchyshyn, Donna Luke, Justin Stockman, Spencer Fritz, Brett Ashley, Tomás Maturana (season 5)	Nominated	
2026	Best Direction, Reality/Competition	Shelagh O'Brien, "Go Off Queen"	Won	
2026	Best Writing, Lifestyle or Reality/Competition	Brandon Ash-Mohammed, Trevor Boris, Spencer Fritz, Jake Benaim, "Go Off Queen"	Won	
2026	Best Picture Editing, Reality/Competition	Peter Topalovic, "Go Off Queen"	Nominated	
2026	Best Picture Editing, Reality/Competition	Lindsay Ragone, "Grand Finale"	Won	
2026	Best Sound, Lifestyle, Reality, or Entertainment	John Diemer, Scott Brachmayer, Rosie Eberhard, Levi Linton, Dane Kelly, Rob Taylor, Eric Leigh, Alastair Sims, "Go Off Queen"	Won	
2026	Best Production Design or Art Direction, Non-Fiction	Andrew Kinsella, Tara Smith, "Go Off Queen"	Won	
2026	Best Achievement in Make-Up	Viktor Peters, "The Slayoffs: Teams Edition"	Won	
2026	Best Achievement in Hair	Kirsten Klontz, "Greetings Queenlings"	Nominated	
2026	Best Casting, Non-Fiction	Heather Muir, "Go Off Queen"	Won	
2026	Best Host or Presenter, Factual or Reality/Competition	Brooke Lynn Hytes, Brad Goreski, Traci Melchor (season 5)	Won	

== Canadian Sync Awards ==
The Canadian Sync Awards are awarded by the Guild of Music Producers for music syncing in film, television, video games, and digital media. Canada's Drag Race has received three nominations, with one for Canada's Drag Race: Canada vs. the World.

Canada's Drag Race franchise wins and nominations at the Canadian Sync Awards
Year	Category	Nominees	Result	Ref.
2023	Best Sync - Soundtrack, Episodic Series (Comedy)	Cody Partridge (season 3)	Nominated	
2025	Best Sync - Soundtrack, Reality/Competition Program or Series	Asha Dillon (season 5)	Nominated	
2025	Best Sync - Soundtrack, Reality/Competition Program or Series	Asha Dillon - Canada's Drag Race: Canada vs. the World (season 2)	Nominated	

== Indiescreen Awards ==
The Indiescreen Awards are awarded by the Canadian Media Producers Association for independent film, television, and digital media producers. Slaycation has received one nomination.

Canada's Drag Race franchise wins and nominations at the Indiescreen Awards
Year	Category	Nominees	Result	Ref.
2025	Television Producer Award	Blue Ant Studios, Matt Hornburg, Mark Bishop - Slaycation (season 1)	Nominated	

== See also ==
- List of awards and nominations received by RuPaul
- List of awards and nominations received by RuPaul's Drag Race
