= Indigenous drag performers =

Two-Spirit Flag

Indigenous drag performers are those who may incorporate aspects of their Indigenous and/or tribal identity into their drag performances. In the United States and Canada such performers may also be considered Indigiqueer and/or two-spirit.

== Overview ==
Some Indigenous drag performers see imbuing their creative work with Indigenous aesthetics, values, and themes as an act of resistance and resurgence. Through costume, makeup, design, and even naming the Indigenous drag performers break away from colonial norms and resist erasure. In this way, art and fashion can be seen as pathways to Indigenous reclamation and empowerment. According to researcher Treena Clark, the aesthetic expression that is present in drag performances can be seen as a strategy for cultural survival and resistance, which engages each individual artist in truth-telling, amplifies resilience, and promotes reconciliation. This idea of Indigenous drag being an act of artistry can be seen through interactions such as the one Jayelene Tyme and Xana had on Canada's Drag Race. During the interaction Xana, who was dealing with the struggles of feeling disconnected from her community and Indigenity expressed these emotions. Upon her expression, Tyme gifted her a Métis sash. Tyme stating, "I'm reminded how important it is for us to create spaces where people can feel safe, to share how they feel."

== Indigenous drag events ==
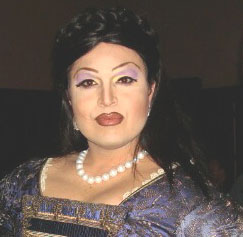
Grand Duchess Landa Lakes, a Two-Spirit Chickasaw drag queen, at Ducal Coronation 2008.

In 2017, the Miss First Nation drag competition, open to performers of Aboriginal and Torres Strait Islander identity, was established in Darwin, Australia. In 2023, the first Miss First Nation Supreme Queen was held in Sydney.

== Notable Indigenous drag performers ==
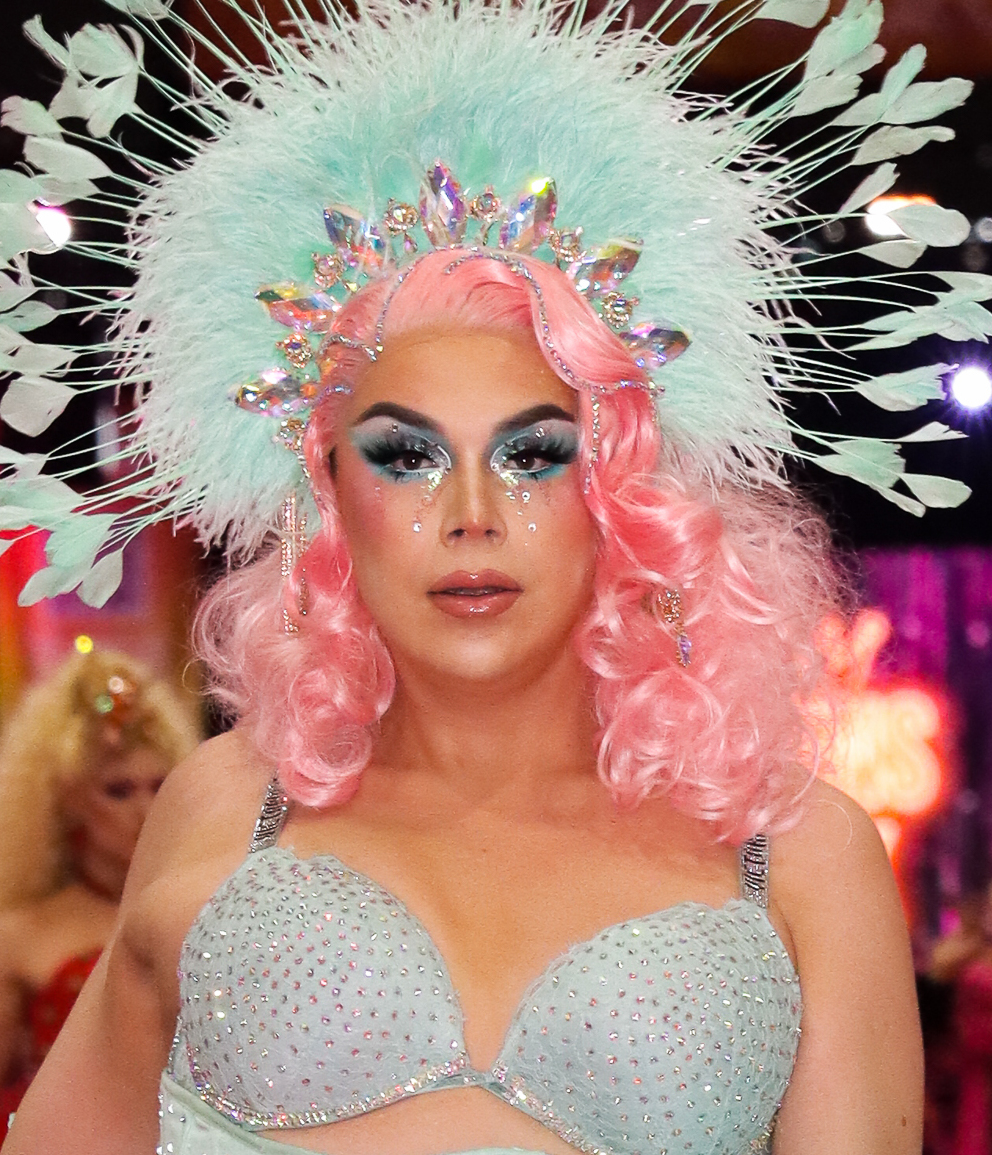
Chelazon Leroux at RuPaul's DragCon LA 2024

List of notable Indigenous drag performers including their nationality, specific Indigenous identity, tribe, nation, or reserve, and notability.

- Anita Landback, a Canadian drag queen who was profiled on Canada's a Drag.
- Beth, a Canadian Métis drag queen who competed on Canada's Drag Race season 2.
- Carla Rossi, an American two-spirit drag performer who is a citizen of the Confederated Tribes of Grand Ronde.
- Chelazon Leroux, a Canadian two-spirit drag queen from the Buffalo River Dene Nation who competed on Canada's Drag Race season 3.
- Eddi Licious, a Canadian Métis two-spirit drag king who was profiled on Canada's a Drag.
- Ilona Verley, an American-Canadian Nlaka'pamux two-spirit drag queen who competed on Canada's Drag Race season 1.
- Jaylene Tyme, a Canadian First Nations and Métis two-spirit drag queen who is registered with the Zagime Anishinabek Nation. She was profiled on Canada's a Drag and competed on Canada's Drag Race season 5.
- Kaos, a Canadian Métis two-spirit drag performer who competed on Canada's Drag Race season 3.
- Massey Whiteknife, also known as ICESIS Rain, a Canadian Cree two-spirit drag performer who is a member of the Mikisew Cree First Nation.
- Matraka, a Mexican Indigenous drag queen who competed on Drag Race Mexico season 1.
- Mirage, an American Native and Indigenous Mexican drag queen who competed on RuPaul's Drag Race season 16.
- Miss Chief Eagle Testickle, a Canadian Cree drag performer.
- Mya Foxx, a Canadian Inuk drag performer who competed on Call Me Mother season 2, and on Canada's Drag Race season 6
- Sasha Colby, an American Hawaiian drag queen who won Miss Continental and RuPaul's Drag Race season 15.
- Shuga Cain, an American Apache drag queen who competed on RuPaul's Drag Race season 11.
- Stacy Layne Matthews, an American Lumbee drag queen who competed on RuPaul's Drag Race season 3.
- The Virgo Queen, a Canadian Afro-Indigenous drag queen who won Canada's Drag Race season 5.
- Trixie Mattel, an American Ojibwe drag queen who competed on RuPaul's Drag Race season 7, won RuPaul's Drag Race All Stars season 3, and is known for her careers in music, television (Queen of the Universe, The Trixie & Katya Show, Trixie Motel), web series (I Like to Watch, UNHhhh), and business ventures (This is It!, Trixie Cosmetics, Trixie Motel).
- Uýra Sodoma, a Brazilian Indigenous travesti artist and drag performer.
- Venus, a Canadian Métis drag performer who won Canada's Drag Race season 4.
- VIZIN, an American drag performer and member of the Arikara tribe.
- Xana, a Canadian Metis two-spirit drag queen who competed on Canada's Drag Race season 5.
