= Pit Crew (Drag Race) =

Group of male models

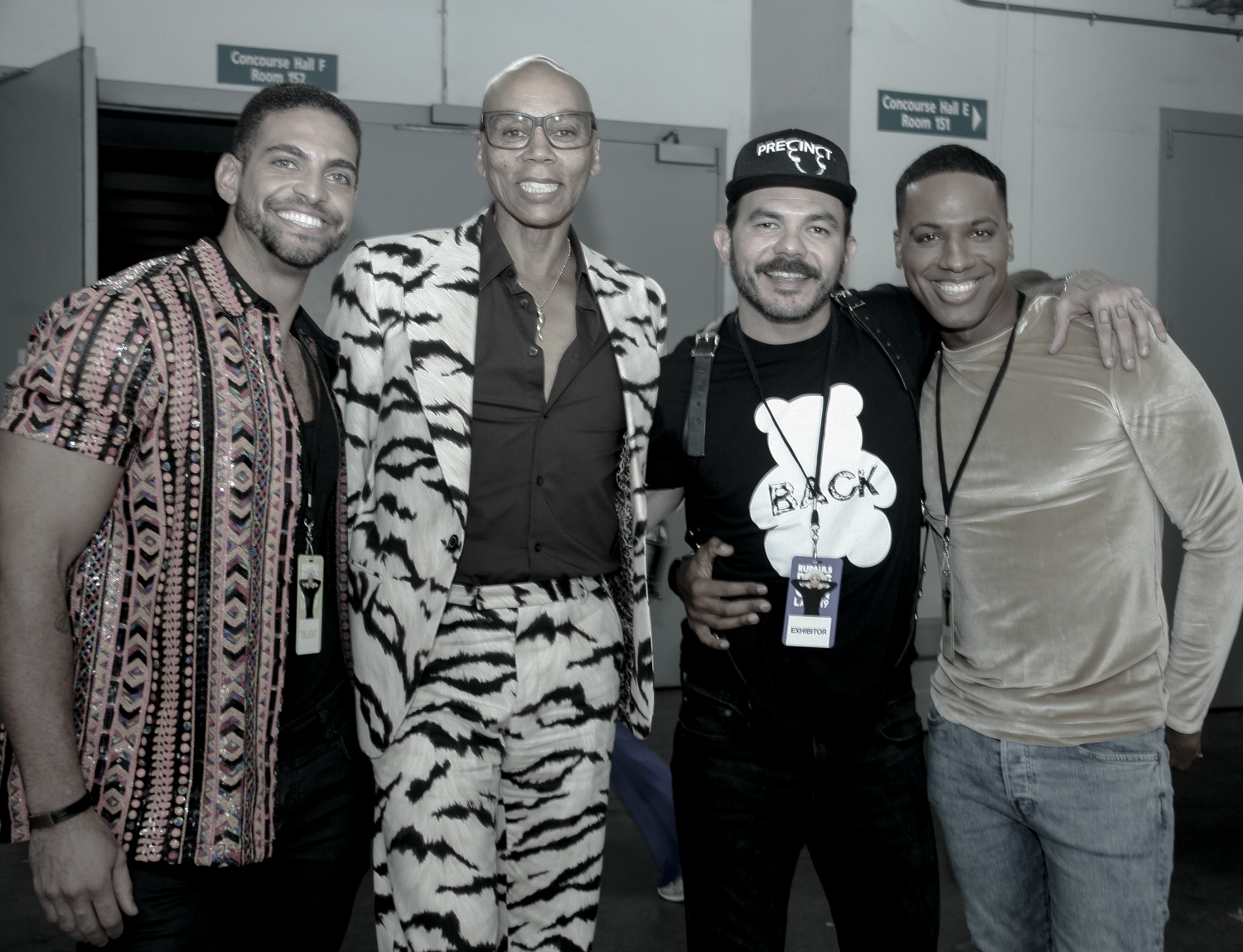
Pit Crew members with RuPaul (second from left), including Bruno Alcantara (far left) and Shawn Morales (second from right), at RuPaul's DragCon LA in 2019

The Pit Crew is the ensemble of scantily clad male models who appear on camera for various segments of the American television series RuPaul's Drag Race and its derivatives, utilizing the motif of car drag racing. During season 6 of Drag Race, and on Drag Race Thailand, the group are known as the Scruff Pit Crew. The group are called the Brit Crew on RuPaul's Drag Race UK. A behind-the-scenes weekly web series Oh Pit Crew launched in 2014 with season six and airs on WOW Presents Plus, and its related YouTube channel.

== Function ==
Crew members often appear dressed only in designer underwear, and features as human props, and in sketches, mini-, and maxi-challenges to aid the drag queen contestants. In one mini-challenge called "Pants Down Bottoms Up", the competing drag queens picked Pit Crew men by two to drop their pants until they found matching underwear.

== Members ==
=== RuPaul's Drag Race (2009–present) ===
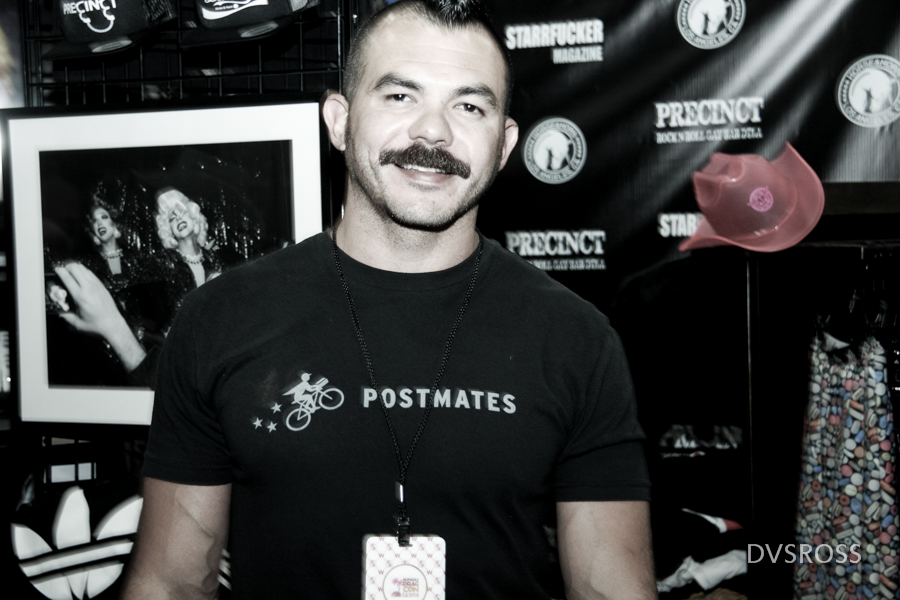
Shawn Morales in 2018

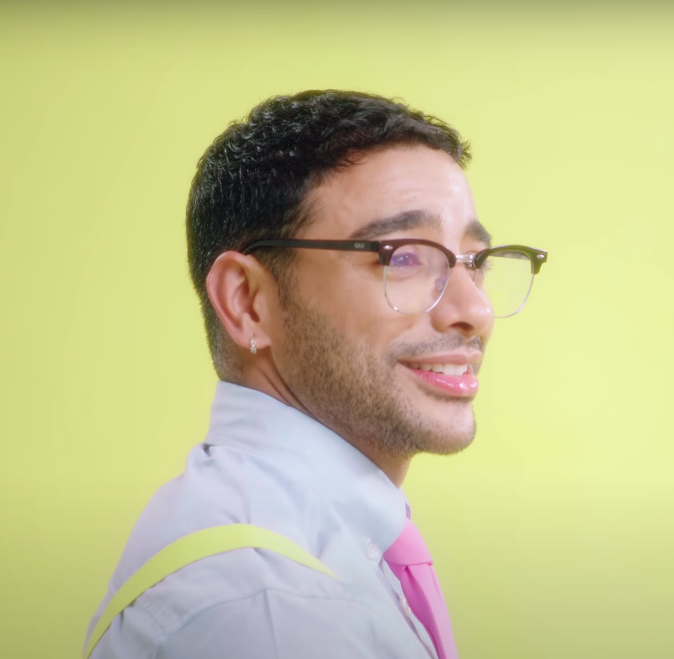
Laith Ashley in the music video for "Girl Baby" by Ezra Michel

Pit Crew members of the first season of RuPaul's Drag Race included Kenyon Glover, Keon Hunt, and Preston Taylor. Max "The Body" Philisaire participated during the second season.

Television host and men's lifestyle expert Jason J. Carter joined for seasons 3–10. Shawn Morales was a member for seasons 3–6. According to Morales, he and Carter got the job through their being go-go dancers in gay clubs; a friend "knew someone in the casting department" and secured an audition.

Ronnie Kroell was a Pit Crew member for the fifth season. Miles Davis Moody, an actor and model, was a member for seasons 6–8. Simon Sherry-Wood was a member for the sixth season, and previously starred on The Real World: Paris (2003). Bryce Eilenberg, a straight ally, was a member since season 7. Jared North and Yadier Despaigne joined the crew for season 9. Laith Ashley appeared as the Pit Crew's first openly trans man during the series' tenth season. Bruno Alcantara joined the crew for the eleventh season (2019), and Calixto Quan was a member during the fifteenth season.

=== RuPaul's Drag Race All Stars (2012–present) ===
Wilson Lai was a member during the fourth season of RuPaul's Drag Race All Stars.

=== Drag Race Thailand (2018–present) ===
Drag Race Thailand started in 2018 with an eight-member crew branded as the Scruff Pit Crew, after the queer men's dating mobile app. Up to three members appeared in each episode. Members include Nikkai, cosplay enthusiast Nut, and Pae.

=== RuPaul's Drag Race UK (2019–present) ===
The Brit Crew members were announced a few weeks prior to RuPaul's Drag Race UK premiering in October 2019. The casting requirements included that they were at least six feet tall, attractive, "athletic and toned physique", no tattoos, aged 18-35, and comfortable in just underwear. The series debuted with five members, and two more were added after the first episode. Season 1 members include:

- AJ Bediako, an actor, model, and gamer.
- Archie Ahern, a lawyer in the music industry.
- Ashraf "Raf" Ejjbair, a multi-sensory artist, go-go dancer, and event host.
- Matt Lister, a multi-medal winning slalom canoeist, model, and fitness writer, he is openly gay, an LGBTQ ambassador for the British Athletes Commission, and as of October 2019, engaged to his boyfriend.
- Mitch Marion, an openly gay part-time model, and filmmaker.
- Niko Wirachman (35–36 years old), is half German and half Indonesian, openly gay, is a professional dancer, and actor doing musical theater, and represented Germany in the 2017 Mr. Gay Europe contest.
- Tom Scanlon, a musical theater actor, and a drag queen in the quintet The Globe Girls.

=== RuPaul's Drag Race Live! (2020) ===
RuPaul's Drag Race Live! shows in Las Vegas features a rotating cast of RuPaul's Drag Race contestants in a live show akin to the Werq the World tour. The shows Pit Crew all double as dancers in the queens' numbers. Crew members include: AJ Watkins, Dallas Eli, Filip Lacina, Michael Silas, Nick Lemer, and Sebastian Gonzalez. In 2024, the season 16 episode "Drag Race Vegas Live! Makeovers" featured RuPaul's Drag Race contestants giving makeovers to members of the variety show's Pit Crew.

=== Canada's Drag Race (2020–present) ===
The Pit Crew on Canada's Drag Race attracted media attention for including Mina Gerges, who was the first plus-size man to be featured in the Pit Crew on any edition of the series, and Travis L'Henaff, an HIV-positive model and activist who has been featured in HIV/AIDS awareness campaigns in Canada. Other members included Evan Boutsov, Seth Falk, and Minhi Wang, who later competed on the show's fifth season.

=== RuPaul's Drag Race Down Under (2021–present) ===
Regular members of the Pit Crew of RuPaul's Drag Race Down Under included Max Currie, Sean Walters, and Rod Tian.

=== Drag Race España (2021–present) ===
The twelve members of Pit Crew on the Spanish adaptation were presented a few weeks prior to Drag Race España premiering in May 2021. New members were introduced during season 2, among them a trans man and a bear.

Megui Yeillow became the first Pit Crew member to compete on the show. Guille Flores has also been a member.

=== Drag Race Philippines (2022–present) ===
Pit Crew members of Drag Race Philippines have included JP Ocat, Ricardo De Jesus, Dheyle Dizon, and Jaycee Sahagun.

=== Drag Race Brasil (2023–present) ===
Pit Crew members of Drag Race Brasil have included Alex Burán and Richard Kuellar.
