= Bruno Alcantara =

Brazilian model

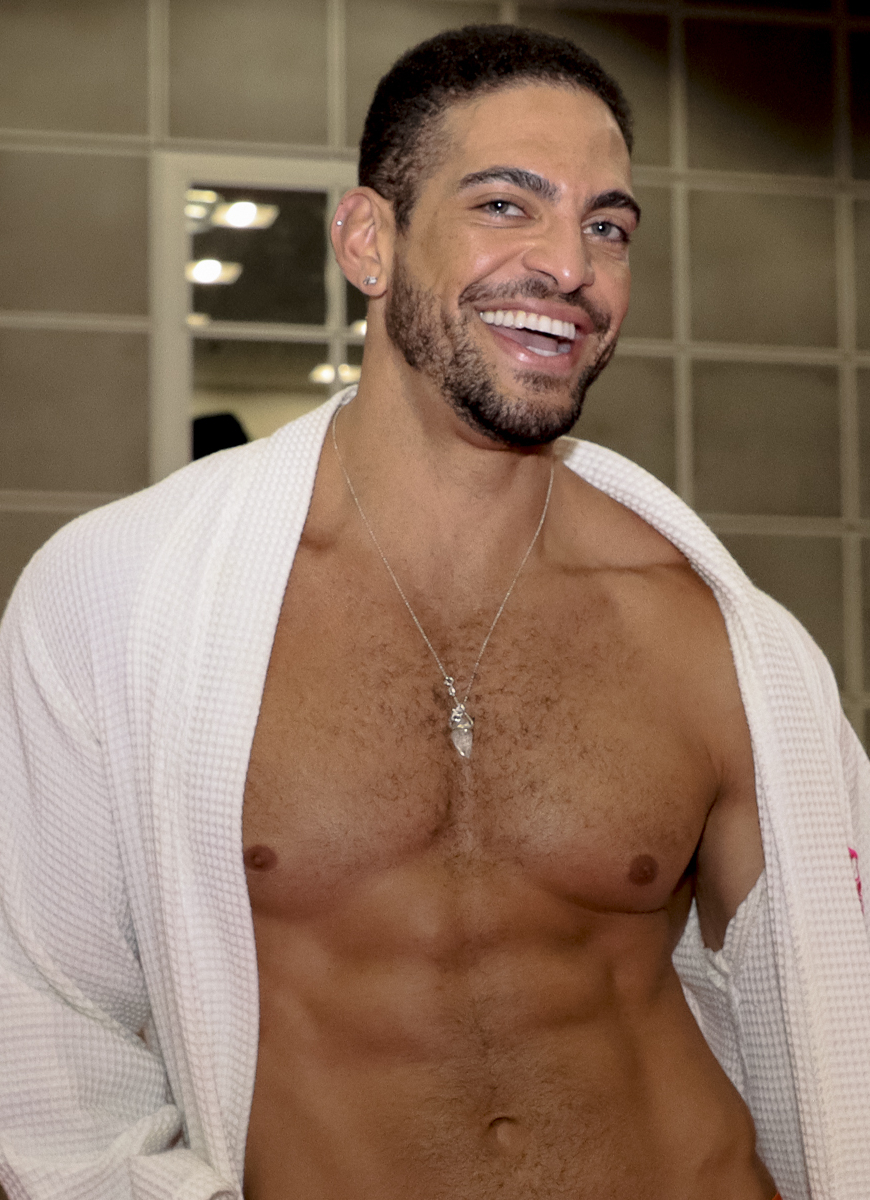
- Alcantara in 2022

Bruno Alcantara is a Brazilian model and a member of the Pit Crew on the American television series RuPaul's Drag Race. He joined the group for the show's eleventh season in 2019. Alcantara has hosted In Bed with Bruno and the WOW Presents Plus series Happy Endings with Bruno.

== Early life ==
Alcantara was born in Brazil.

== Personal life ==
Alcantara is gay.
