= Makayla Couture =

Canadian drag performer (born 2002)

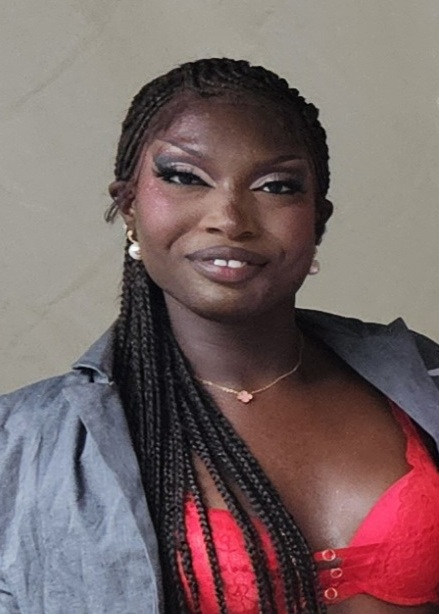
- Makayla Couture at Capital Pride 2025 in Ottawa on August 23rd.
- Born: July 3, 2002 (age 24); Toronto, Ontario, Canada
- Other name: Makayla Walker Louboutin
- Occupation: Drag queen
- Years active: 2021–present
- Television: Call Me Mother; Canada's Drag Race

Makayla Walker (born July 3, 2002), known professionally as Makayla Couture, is a Canadian drag performer, activist, and television personality based in Toronto, Ontario. She rose to prominence as a finalist on the fifth season for reality competition television series Canada's Drag Race in 2024, and later competed in its first All Stars iteration, where she placed in sixth.

Before competing, she appeared as a makeover guest from the same series in 2021, which made her the first special guest to later compete as a contestant from the Drag Race franchise. The next year, Makayla Couture soon competed and placed as a runner-up in another television series, Call Me Mother (2022).

== Early life and education ==
Makayla Walker was born on July 3, 2002, and was raised in the neighbourhood of Jane and Finch, located in the northwest end of Toronto, Ontario. She experienced discrimination during the sixth grade, where her locker had set aflame in middle school by a student. Walker attended public Earl Haig Secondary School, participating as a theatre major under the Claude Watson program.

== Career and public image ==
=== 2021–2023: Drag beginnings and Call Me Mother ===
Walker initially began performing under the drag persona Makayla Walker Louboutin at some local drag shows in Toronto. She made her first television appearance as a special guest for competition series Canada's Drag Race (2021), where she partook in a makeover challenge alongside contestant (and now winner) Icesis Couture. She presented herself as Ruby Couture and wore a red Cher–inspired outfit symbolizing fire. Walker now performs as Makayla Couture. The next year, Makayla Couture competed in the second season of Call Me Mother (2022). Over the course of the season, she was selected into the House of Dulcet formed by American drag queen Peppermint, won one challenge, and finished as a top four finalist.

As the drag panic rose throughout Canada in 2023, the drag performer protested with Violet Parks by hosting a Drag Queen Story Hour event at the McLaughlin Branch of the Oshawa Public Library on June 3. Makayla Couture later appeared in a Pride campaign for British cosmetics the Body Shop to involve customers to support the Equality Act for the United States. This promotional campaign featured two more drag performers, Angel Au and Lana Ja'Rae. Her activism soon continued by performing at various festivals and events highlighting the Ballroom scene, HIV awareness, and supporting the LGBTQ+ community.

=== 2024–present: Canada's Drag Race and breakthrough ===
For three consecutive years, Makayla Couture performed at the Wilfrid Laurier University since 2022. She was also included in the Lavender Wild lineup, located in music venue History. The concert occurred on August 24, 2024, that featured American singers Slayyyter and Rebecca Black. Later on, the drag performer sooner made her first film appearance for documentary Any Other Way: The Jackie Shane Story (2024), alongside American actress Sandra Caldwell. She depicted as the younger self of prominent soul singer Jackie Shane in rotoscoped footage.

Makayla Couture was announced to be competing in the fifth season of Canada's Drag Race, becoming the first makeover special guest to later appear as a contestant from the Drag Race franchise on October 23, 2024. In the premiere episode, she and her the ten competitors performed "Go Off Queen" (featuring series host Brooke Lynn Hytes) which impressed the judges but was ultimately placed in the top two. Makayla Couture soon won the 1990s–inspired girl group challenge on episode five; the song "Not" features singer Simone Denny. Afterwards, she portrayed American media proprietor Oprah Winfrey for the Snatch Game challenge and struggled for being "too simple and secretive." The drag performer again fell out short in an improv challenge where she attend a talk show hosted by former judge Brad Goreski. Both tasks caused Makayla Couture to be nearly eliminated twice but remained safe in two lip-sync contests against Perla and Uma Gahd.

Eventually, she finished the season as a runner-up behind winner The Virgo Queen, after lip-syncing to "From This Moment On" (1998) by singer and songwriter Shania Twain. Kevin O'Keeffe of Xtra Magazine commented she had been "rollercoaster of a time" and could soon have a "great deal of potential for a future [Drag Race spin-off] run as she continues to mature and develop".

== Personal life ==
Based in Toronto, Walker is a trans woman and uses the pronouns she/her. She is of Jamaican descent.

After appearing on Canada's Drag Race, Makayla Couture joined the House of Couture led by her drag mother Icesis Couture along with her drag sister Kimmy Couture, who also competed in the same series.

== Filmography ==
=== Films ===
List of film credits, with selected details
Year	Title	Genre	Role	Notes	Ref.
2024	Any Other Way: The Jackie Shane Story	Documentary	Jackie Shane	No notes	

=== Television ===
List of television credits, with selected details
Year	Title	Genre	Role	Notes	Ref.
2021; 2024	Canada's Drag Race	Competition	Guest	Season 2, Episode 8: "Prom"	
2021; 2024	Canada's Drag Race	Competition	Runner-up	No notes	
2022	Call Me Mother	Competition	Runner-up	No notes	
2025	Battle of the Generations	Competition	Contestant	Season 2, Episode 2: "Battle 22"	
2026	Canada's Drag Race All Stars	Competition	6th place	No notes	

=== Podcasts ===
List of podcast credits, with selected details
Year	Title	Role	Notes	Ref.
2022	Happy to See Me with Erika Casupanan	Guest	Season 1, Episode 10	

== See also ==
- List of people from Toronto
