= Sanjina DaBish Queen =

Drag performer

- Born: Surrey, British Columbia
- Occupation: Drag performer
- Television: Canada's Drag Race

Sanjina DaBish Queen is a Canadian drag performer who competed on the first season of Call Me Mother and the fifth season of Canada's Drag Race.

== Career ==
On Canada's Drag Race, Sanjina DaBish Queen discussed her experience with body dysmorphia as well as her strained relationship with her mother. Sanjina DaBish Queen was eliminated from the competition after placing in the bottom two of a design challenge and losing a lip-sync contest against Uma Gahd.

Sanjina DaBish Queen and Toronto mayor Olivia Chow rang in 2025 as part of the city's New Year festivities.

== Personal life ==
Sanjina DaBish Queen was born and raised in Surrey, British Columbia. She has described herself as "the trans, Fijian, Bolly-hood queen" of Toronto.

== Filmography ==
- Call Me Mother (season 1; 2021)
- Canada's Drag Race (season 5; 2024)

== See also ==
- List of people from Toronto
