= Helena Poison =

Drag performer

- Born: Matt Fancy
- Occupation: Drag performer
- Television: Canada's Drag Race

Helena Poison is the stage name of Matt Fancy, a Canadian drag performer who competed on the fifth season of Canada's Drag Race.

== Career ==
Helena Poison is a drag performer, designer, and make-up artist who competed on the fifth season of Canada's Drag Race. On the show, she won one main challenge and never placed in the bottom. She also impersonated actress Jennifer Tilly for the Snatch Game challenge. Helena Poison was a top four finalist.

== Personal life ==
Fancy is originally from St. Catharines, Ontario. He is based in Toronto.

Helena Poison's name references two songs by My Chemical Romance ("Helena" and "Party Poison").

== Filmography ==
- Canada's Drag Race (season 5; 2024)

== See also ==
- List of drag queens
- List of people from Toronto
