= Canadian Cinema Editors =

Professional association of film and TV editors

Canadian Cinema Editors (CCE) is a professional, educational and cultural association of film editors founded in 2007. The bilingual non-profit organization promotes picture editing in television, film and new media. Central goals of the organization include showcasing achievements of Canadian picture editors to the world, bringing together fellow editors and assistant editors together at social events and screenings, and educating its members and the public in the art and science of picture editing.

== Membership ==
The Canadian Cinema Editors offers five types of membership levels: student, associate, regional associate, full, and lifetime. Applications to join as an associate member are open to all post-production professionals including picture editors, assistant editors, post-production supervisors and other film professionals interested in joining. Regional associate members receive a discount based on their place a residence. As of 2022, the regions qualifying for the discount include: Western Canada (Alberta, Saskatchewan & Manitoba); Yukon, Northwest Territories & Nunavut; Quebec; Atlantic Canada (Nova Scotia, New Brunswick, PEI, Newfoundland & Labrador). Current students enrolled in full time study or in a co-op work experience can apply for a student membership and receive a significant discount. Full membership is offered to associate members who apply and qualify based on criteria such as: the quality of their achievements, their passion to the craft of editing and education of the craft to peers and students. Full Members must be sponsored by at least 2 current Full Members. A jury of peers votes on the application, based on a minimum of 60 hours of edited work and overall quality. Successful applicants may use the designation C.C.E. after their name. A lifetime membership is granted to an individual who has won a CCE lifetime achievement award.

Full Members (as of 2017)

- Ricardo Acosta
- Jamie Alain
- Trevor Ambrose
- George Appleby
- Michel Arcand
- Geoff Ashenhurst
- Mike Banas
- Michael John Bateman
- Manfred Becker
- Thorben Bieger
- Lisa Binkley
- James Bredin
- Ralph Brunjes
- Don Cassidy
- Caroline Christie
- Julian Clarke
- Alan Collins
- Richard Comeau
- Chris Cooper
- Jean Coulombe
- Daryl Davis
- Paul Day
- Teresa De Luca
- Pia Di Ciaula
- Michael Doherty
- Christopher Donaldson
- Daria Ellerman
- Ken Filywych
- Ellen Fine
- Eric Goddard
- Roushell Goldstein
- Lisa Grootenboer
- Cathy Gulkin
- Wendy Hallam
- Matthew Hannam
- Teresa Hannigan
- Reginald Harkema
- Nick Hector
- Michèle Hozer
- James Ilecic
- Thomas Joerin
- Roslyn Kalloo
- Debra Karen
- Dave Kazala
- Bert Kish
- Bruce Lange
- Stephen Lawrence
- Allan Lee
- Mike Lee
- Isabelle Malenfant
- Roger Mattiussi
- Lara Mazur
- Gordon McClellan
- Kimberlee McTaggart
- Rik Morden
- Michael Morningstar
- Kelly Morris
- Jane Morrison
- Mike Munn
- Dona Noga
- Werner Nold
- Michael Pacek
- Deborah Palloway
- Stephen Philipson
- Jay Prychidny
- Gordon Rempel
- Charles Robichaud
- Lisa Robison
- George Roulston
- Mark Sanders
- Ron Sanders
- Gary L "Kelly" Smith
- Mary Stephen
- Brett Sullivan
- Vesna Svilanovic
- David B. Thompson
- Gordon Thorne
- D. Gillian Truster
- Pete Watson
- Craig Webster
- L. Ion Webster
- Steve Weslak
- Greg West
- Ben Wilkinson
- Mairin Wilkinson
- Paul Winestock
- Ron Wisman Sr

== Board of Directors ==
As of October 2022, the board of directors consists of:

- Chris Mutton (President)
- Kimberlee McTaggart (Vice president)
- Janet Savill (Secretary)
- Lesley Mackay Hunter (Treasurer)
- Pauline Decroix (Bilingualism Chair)
- Xi Feng (Events and Education Chair)
- Adam van Boxmeer (Sponsorship Chair)
- Andrew Cromey (Communications Chair)
- Greg Ng (British Columbia Regional Chair)
- Mandeep Sodhi (Western Canada Regional Chair)
- Craig Macintosh (Ontario Regional Chair)
- Isabelle Malenfant, CCE (Quebec Regional Chair)
- Wes Paster (Atlantic Regional Chair)

Operations Manager

- Alison Dowler

== The CCE Awards ==
The CCE awards were introduced in 2011 as a way to celebrate the best editing in Canada. The first CCE awards ceremony was held at the Capital Theatre in Toronto on May 19, 2011. Winners were announced in eight categories.

== 2011 CCE Award Winners ==
Category	Person/People	Show
Best Editing in Feature Length Dramatic	Michele Conroy, CCE	Splice
Best Editing in MOW or Mini-series	Mike Lee, CCE	Keep Your Head Up, Kid: The Don Cherry Story
Best Editing in One-hour Broadcast Long Form Dramatic	Lisa Grootenboer, CCE	The Tudors: Episode 405, Bottom of the Pot
Best Editing in Half-hour Broadcast Short Form Dramatic	David B. Thompson, CCE	Living in Your Car: Episode 101
Best Editing in Documentary	Nick Hector, CCE	Force of Nature: The David Suzuki Movie
Best Editing in Lifestyle/Reality	Jeff Reynolds & Jay Prychidny	Canada's Next Top Model: Episode 308, Rockin' The Runway
Best Editing in Animation	Annellie Samuel	Producing Parker: Episode 120, How Green Is My Parker
Best Editing in Short Film	Roderick Deogrades	The Day I Thought I Died
Student Merit Award	Deborah Gurofsky – We Make Machines (Queens University) Lauren Horn – Two Cities (Sheridan College) Cameron Nixdorf - Sasha (York University) Ernesto Sosa Lopez - Kilometres (York University)	

== 2012 CCE Award Winners ==
Category	Person/People	Show
Best Editing in Feature Length Dramatic	Roger Mattiussi, CCE	Afghan Luke
Best Editing in Long Form Television Series (1 hr. drama, comedy, family program)	Teresa De Luca, CCE	Combat Hospital: Episode 110, Reason to Believe
Best Editing in Television Movie or Mini-Series	Don Cassidy, CCE	The Kennedys: Episode 4
Best Editing in 1/2 hour Broadcast Short Form (under 30 min.)	Brigitte Rabazo	Todd and the Book of Pure Evil: Episode 206, Fisting Fantasy
Best Editing in Documentary	Michèle Hozer, CCE	West Wind: The Vision of Tom Thompson
Best Editing in Lifestyle/Reality	Jonathan Dowler	Undercover Boss: Episode 1003, 1-800 GOT JUNK
Best Editing in Animation	Kurt Skyers & Robert Henry	Scaredy Squirrel: Episode 22, Perfect Pickle / Goat Police
Best Editing in Short Film	Michelle Szemberg	Business Ethics
Lifetime Achievement Awards	George Appleby, CCE; Ron Wisman Snr, CCE	

== 2013 CCE Award Winners ==
Category	Person/People	Show
Best Editing in Feature length	Roderick Deogrades	Still Mine
Best Editing in Television Movie or Mini-Series	Ron Wisman Sr., CCE	An Officer and a Murderer
Best Editing in Long Form Television Series – (1 hour drama, comedy, family program)	Stephen Lawrence, CCE	The Transporter: Episode 112, Trojan Horsepower
Best Editing in 1/2 hour Broadcast Short Form	Charles Robichaud	R.L. Stine's The Haunting Hour: Uncle Howie
Best Editing in Documentary	Nick Hector, CCE	Echoes
Best Editing in Lifestyle/Reality	Al Flett & Erin Cummings	Ice Pilots: Episode 406, Crash Landing
Best Editing in Animation	Kurt Skyers & Joycelyn Poon	Babar and the Adventures of Badou: Babar the Pirate/Stripes vs. Scales
Best Editing in Short film	Bryan Atkinson	Night Light
Best Editing in Any Live Action Web Series (Comedy or Drama)	Anthony Baird & Thom Smalley	Guidestones: Episode 30, Market Collapse
Lifetime Achievement Awards	Ralph Brunjes, C.C.E. Kelly Smith, C.C.E. (Posthumous) Rik Morden, C.C.E. (Posthumous)	
Student Merit Awards	Haya Waseem (Sheridan College) Mitch Spicer (Vancouver Film School) Roxana Perez Fernandez (Vancouver Film School) Matt Yim (University of Regina) Jon Anctil (Capilano University) Zhengwei Chen (Fanshawe College) Jason O'Hara (Ryerson University)	Mimos Captive Fish Can Fly April Doesn't Hurt Here Marathon Gossip Demur

== 2014 CCE Award Winners ==
Category	Person/People	Show
Best Editing in Feature length	Matthew Hannam	Enemy
Best Editing in Television Movie or Mini-Series	Garth C. Scales, CCE	What Remains
Best Editing in Long Form Television Series – (1 hour drama, comedy, family program)	Stephen Lawrence, CCE	Orphan Black, Episode 103
Best Editing in 1/2 hour Broadcast Short Form	Jay Prychidny	The Next Step, Ep 30 Winner
Best Editing in Documentary	Mark Ratzlaff	Blood Relative
Best Editing in Lifestyle/Reality	Giorgio Saturnino & Michael Esteves	Jonathan Toews, Every Picture Tells A Story
Best Editing in Animation	Paul Hunter	The Nut Job
Best Editing in Short Film	Erin Deck	Sunday Punch
Best Editing in Web Series	Michael Doherty, CCE	Darknet, Episode 101
Lifetime Achievement Award	Debra Karen	
Student Merit Award	Walter Woodman (Ryerson University) Ray Savaya (Sheridan College) Mark Fifield (Humber College) Daniel Haack (Ryerson University) Angelica Falco (Sheridan College)	Noah Walk the Moon Rosbilt Bridges Anatomy of a Sunbeam

== 2015 CCE Award Winners ==
Category	Person/People	Show
Best Editing in Lifestyle/Reality/Factual	Jonathan Dowler, Al Manson, Kyle Martin, Ben O'Neil & Steve Taylor	The Amazing Race Canada: Episode 205
Best Editing in Short Film	Adam Locke-Norton	Entangled
Best Editing in Live Action Web Series	Graham Chisholm & Stephen Roque	Whatever, Linda: Oh Henry
Best Editing in Animation	Jamie Ebata & Dan Lee	The Day My Butt Went Psycho: Episode 23
Best Editing in Half Hour Broadcast Short Form	James Bredin, CCE Matthew Hannam, CCE	Schitt's Creek, Don't Worry It's His Sister Sensitive Skin: Episode 106
Best Editing in Television Movie or Mini-series	Kye Meechan	The Book of Negroes: Episode 1
Best Editing in Feature Length	Matthew Hannam, CCE	James White
Best Editing in Documentary	Ricardo Acosta, CCE	Marmato
Best Editing in Long Form Television Series	Christopher Donaldson, CCE	Penny Dreadful: Episode105, Closer Than Sisters
Student Merit Award	Jacob DoForno (Humber College) Dylan Lattimer (the University of Toronto) Margaret MacDougall (Sheridan College) Neena Malebennur (Humber College) Mitch Theriault (Sheridan College)	Jacob DoForno from Humber College For "Happy Endings" Dylan Lattimer from the University of Toronto For "Fragility" Margaret MacDougall from Sheridan College For "Her Shadow" Neena Malebennur from Humber College For "In Focus" Mitch Theriault from Sheridan College For "Battles and Brotherhood"

== 2016 CCE Award Winners ==
Category	Person/People	Show
Best Editing in Animation	Stephanie Duncan, Joycelyn Poon & Lee Maund	Trucktown: Trucktown Run
Best Editing in Documentary- Short Form	Tiffany Beaudin	Claude Lanzmann: Spectres of the Shoah
Best Editing in Feature Documentary	Cathy Gulkin, CCE	Guantanamo's Child
Best Editing in Feature Film	Duff Smith	River
Best Editing in 1/2 Hour Scripted	Jorge Parra	Still Standing: Eganville
Best Editing in Lifestyle/Docudrama	Neil Sitka & Miles Davren	Vegas Rat Rods: Episode 201
Best Editing in MOW/Mini-Series	Don Cassidy, CCE	Texas Rising
Best Editing in 1 Hour Scripted	Michael Doherty, CCE	Hannibal: Antipasto
Best Editing in Reality/Competition	Steve Taylor, Michael Tersigni, Anna Bigos & James Osso	The Amazing Race Canada: I Said Straight, You Gorilla
Best Editing in Short Film	Stéphane Lafleur Ben Lawrence	O Negative I Remember
Best Editing in Web Based Series	Nicolas Wong	We Are Disorderly: Our New Friend
Student Award of Merit	Eric Bos (Sheridan College) Eric Bos (Sheridan College) Kevin Horan (Vancouver Film School) Andriy Koval (Centennial College) Chi Hsin Lui (Vancouver Film School) Harrison Perez (Humber College) Rene Seijas Zamboni & Miguel Quintero (Vancouver Film School)	House of Glory Lockwood Voskhod As I Like Her - Evan Reconnection

== 2017 CCE Award Winners ==
Category	Person/People	Show
Best Editing in Animation	Paul Hunter & Aaron Woodley	Spark
Best Editing in Documentary- Short Form	Brenda Terning Greg West, CCE	Vital Bonds Building Star Trek
Best Editing in Feature Documentary	Tony Kent	Spirit Unforgettable
Best Editing in Feature Film	Kye Meechan	ARQ
Best Editing in 1/2 Hour Scripted	Sabrina Pitre	Mech-X4: "Let's Dig Deep"
Best Editing in Lifestyle/Docudrama	Robert Kew	Still Standing: "Inuvik"
Best Editing in MOW/Mini-Series	Lisa Grootenboer, CCE	Mary Kills People: "Bloody Mary"
Best Editing in 1 Hour Scripted	Aaron Marshall	Penny Dreadful: "A Blade of Grass"
Best Editing in Reality/Competition	Jonathan Dowler, Michael Tersigni, Al Manson, Dave McMahon, Ryan Monteith & Cynthia Flengeris	The Amazing Race Canada: "Second Place Isn't Good Enough"
Best Editing in Short Film	Jane MacRae	Thresher
Best Editing in Web Based Series	Sam Thomson & Jay Wolting	Save Me: "HBD 101"

== EditCon ==
EditCon is an annual conference organized by the CCE that celebrates the art of picture editing. The first EditCon was held on February 10, 2018, at the TIFF Bell Lightbox. It was sold out to 150 guests. Editcon has featured notable editor guests such as Michelle Tesoro, ACE, Wendy Hallam Martin, ACE, CCE, Jinmo Yang, ACE, Elísabet Ronaldsdóttir, ACE, Harry Yoon, ACE, and Dylan Tichenor, ACE. Since 2021, EditCon has moved to a hybrid virtual and in-person event. Prerecorded or live panels are presented online with virtual breakout rooms for smaller group discussions. An in-person event is held on the same day in multiple cities. In 2023, in-person events were held in Toronto, Montreal and Vancouver.

== Educational programs and events ==
The CCE offers workshops in conjunction with Centennial College in Toronto, LaSalle College in Vancouver, and Nova Scotia Community College in Halifax.

Recent workshops include Assistant Editing (with James Lawson or Paul Whitehead), Documentary Editing (with Ricardo Acosta, Michèle Hozer, or Kelly Morris), Drama Editing (with Matthew Hannam or Jeanne Slater), Reality Editing (with Jonathan Dowler), and Animation Editing (with Jamie Ebata and Dan Lee).

The CCE regularly holds panel discussions and screenings to educate regarding new post-production issues, and to promote editing as a primary creative force in television and film. Panels have included discussion of the RED camera and how it affects post production, the role of Post Production Supervisor (panelists included Gregor Hutchison, Rachel Sutherland, Adam Roberts, Doug Wilkinson, Julie Lawrence and Gary Mueller), and sound editing. Screenings, followed by questions and answers time with the editor include "Dead Ringers" (editor Ron Sanders, C.C.E.), "Cairo Time" (editor Teresa Hannigan, C.C.E.) and "District 9" (editor Julian Clarke, C.C.E.).

== See also ==
- Directors Guild of Canada
