= Perla (drag queen) =

Drag performer

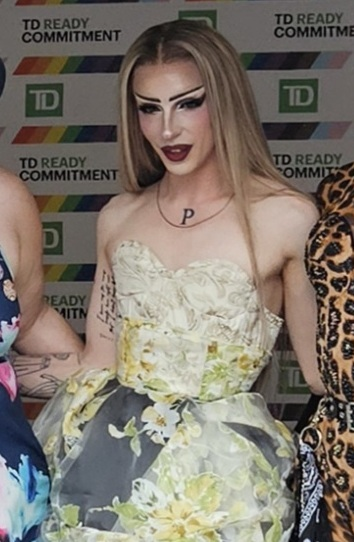
- Perla at Capital Pride 2025 in Ottawa
- Born: Paul Conrad Schneider; Calgary, Alberta, Canada
- Other names: Perla Coddington
- Occupation: Drag performer
- Television: Canada's Drag Race

Perla is the stage name of Paul Conrad Schneider, a Canadian drag performer competing on the fifth season of Canada's Drag Race.

== Early life and education ==
Schneider was born and raised in Calgary, Alberta. He enjoyed theatre at a young age and came out as gay at the age of fourteen.

== Career ==
Perla is a drag performer and model. In Toronto, she performs at Crews and Tangos. In 2022, she won the Absolut Empire's Ball, an annual event established by Scarlett BoBo. Perla competed on the fifth season of Canada's Drag Race. She impersonated Mary-Kate Olsen for the Snatch Game challenge. Perla was eliminated from the competition by Makayla Couture, placing fifth overall.

With fellow Canada's Drag Race alumni Aurora Matrix and Van Goth, Perla is a co-host of The Powder Room, a podcast on Drag Race and other pop culture topics. The trio won the People's Choice Award at the 2025 Canadian Podcast Awards.

== Personal life ==
Schneider is based in Toronto. He is a former fashion blogger.

== Filmography ==
- Canada's Drag Race (season 5; 2024)

== See also ==
- List of drag queens
- List of people from Calgary
- List of people from Toronto
