= Minhi Wang =

Drag performer and model

- Born: Shih-Ming Yao; 1984 or 1985 (age 40–41); Australia
- Occupations: Drag performer; model
- Television: Canada's Drag Race

Minhi Wang is the stage name of Shih-Ming Yao (born 1984 or 1985), an Australian-Canadian drag performer and model best known for competing on the fifth season of Canada's Drag Race.

== Career ==
Minhi Wang is Ming Yao's drag persona. Minhi Wang competed on the fifth season of Canada's Drag Race. Previously, Yao appeared on the show's first season as a member of the Pit Crew. Yao is the second Pit Crew member to compete as a contestant within the Drag Race franchise, following Megui Yeillow of Drag Race España.

On Canada's Drag Race, Minhi Wang won the main challenge of the fourth episode, which tasked contestants with designing an outfit.

Outside of drag, Yao is also a model and an influencer.

== Personal life ==
Originally from Perth, Yao is based in Toronto.

== Filmography ==
- Canada's Drag Race (season 1; 2020), as part of the Pit Crew
- Canada's Drag Race (season 5; 2024)

== See also ==
- List of drag queens
- List of people from Toronto
