= Xana (drag queen) =

Canadian drag performer

- Occupations: Drag performer, musician
- Years active: 2017–present
- Known for: Contestant on Canada's Drag Race (Season 5)

Xana is a Canadian drag performer who competed on the fifth season of Canada's Drag Race.

== Career ==
Xana competed on the fifth season of Canada's Drag Race. She impersonated Bettie Page during the Snatch Game challenge. Xana was eliminated from the competition after placing in the bottom two of a design challenge and losing a lip-sync contest to The Virgo Queen, placing sixth overall.

== Personal life ==
Xana lives in Vancouver. Xana and fellow contestant Jaylene Tyme are a part of the Métis Indigenous community. Jaylene Tyme gifted Xana a Métis ceinture fléchée on the second episode of Canada's Drag Race. Xana is also two-spirit.

== Filmography ==
- Canada's Drag Race (season 5; 2024–2025) - 6th place
- Slaycation season 2 (2025) - Winner

== See also ==
- LGBTQ culture in Vancouver
- List of drag queens
- List of people from Vancouver
