= Tara Nova =

Canadian drag performer

- Born: January 5, 2001 (age 25); Gambo, Newfoundland and Labrador, Canada
- Other name: Tara Oram-Feltham
- Occupation: Drag performer
- Television: Canada's Drag Race

Tara Nova is the stage name of Tara Oram-Feltham, a Canadian drag performer who competed on the fifth season of Canada's Drag Race.

== Career ==
Tara Nova competed on the fifth season of Canada's Drag Race (2024). On the first episode, she revealed that Velvet, the only LGBTQ bar in St. John's, paid drag performers $37.50 per show. The bar cancelled its weekly Canada's Drag Race viewing parties after the episode was broadcast and pledged to ensure improved compensation for performers. On the second episode, Tara Nova was the first contestant to be eliminated from the competition, placing eleventh overall.

== Personal life ==
Originally from Gambo, Newfoundland and Labrador, Oram-Feltham is based in St. John's. In January 2026, she came out as a transgender woman.

== Filmography ==
- Canada's Drag Race - season 5 (2024)
