= Tiffany Ann Co. =

Drag performer

- Occupation: Drag performer
- Television: Canada's Drag Race

Tiffany Ann Co. is a Vietnamese-Canadian drag performer who competed on the fifth season of Canada's Drag Race and the first season of Canada's Drag Race All Stars.

== Career ==
Tiffany Ann Co. is a drag performer. In 2022, she starred in It's Just Drag, alongside Drag Race queens such as Ra'Jah O'Hara and Heidi N Closet at the Commodore Ballroom. In 2023, she performed in Fitness Is Such a Drag outside the Vancouver Art Gallery. She competed on the fifth season of Canada's Drag Race (2024). On the third episode ("The Slayoffs: Teams Edition"), she was the second contestant to be eliminated from the competition.

== Personal life ==
Tiffany Ann Co. is based in Vancouver, having immigrated from Vietnam to Canada.

== Filmography ==
- Canada's Drag Race (season 5; 2024)

== See also ==
- List of drag queens
- List of people from Vancouver
