= The Virgo Queen =

Drag performer

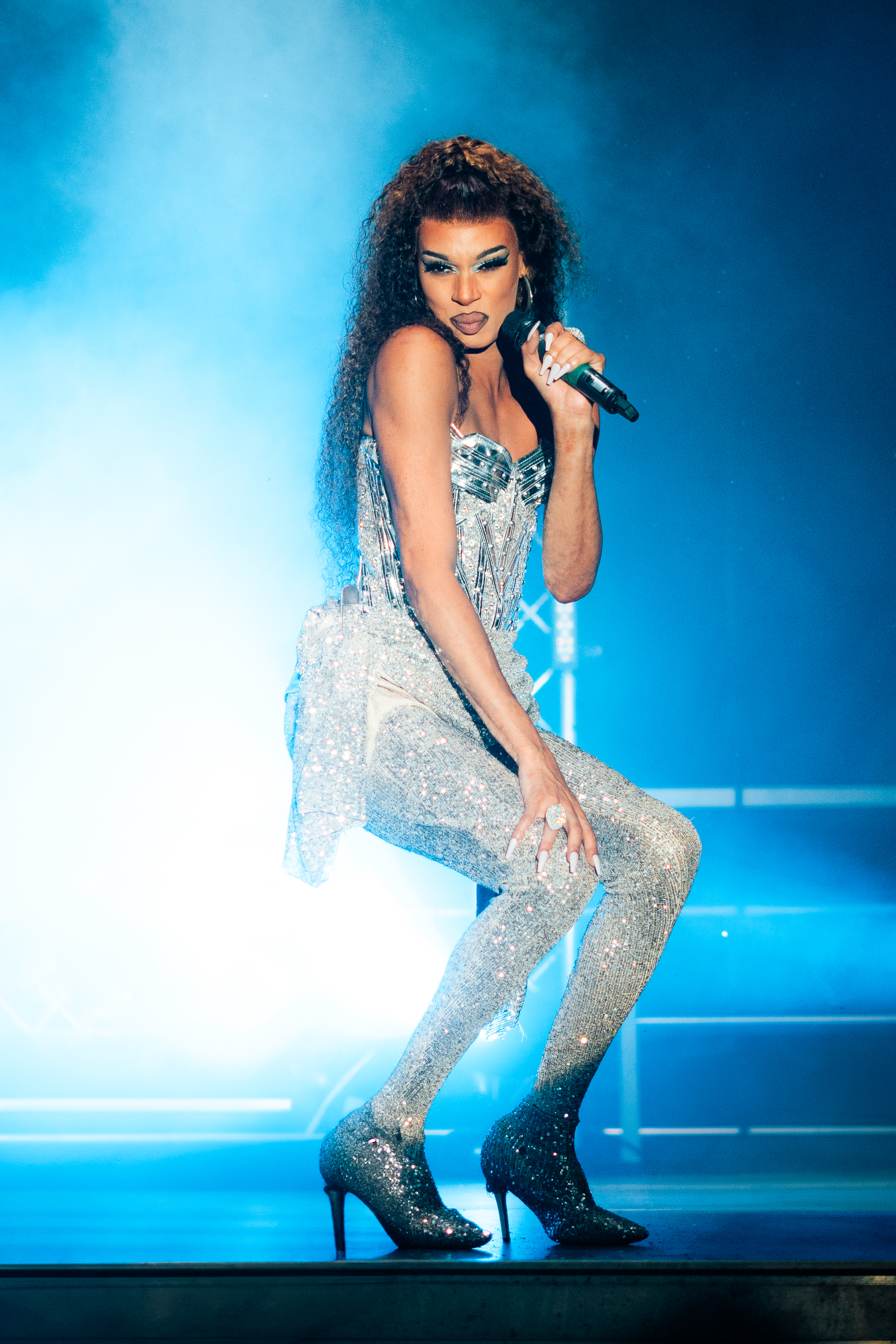
- The Virgo Queen performing at Pride Hamilton in August 2025.
- Born: Jaden MacPhee; 1998 or 1999 (age 27–28)
- Occupation: Drag performer
- Television: The Next Star; Canada's Drag Race

The Virgo Queen is the stage name of Jaden MacPhee, a Canadian drag performer who won the fifth season of Canada's Drag Race. Previously, MacPhee was a finalist on the Canadian reality series The Next Star.

== Career ==
The Virgo Queen was introduced to drag through the eighth season of RuPaul's Drag Race, after a friend told her she resembled Naomi Smalls. She has performed at a halftime show for the Toronto Raptors basketball team.

The Virgo Queen won the fifth season of Canada's Drag Race. She is the series' first Black winner.

== Personal life ==
MacPhee is based in Toronto, and is Afro-Indigenous with indigenous roots in Nova Scotia.

== See also ==
- Indigenous drag performers
- List of people from Toronto

== Filmography ==
- The Next Star (season 6; 2013)
- Canada's Drag Race (season 5; 2024)
