= Canada's Drag Race season 5 =

2024–2025 season of Canada's Drag Race

Canada's Drag Race
- Season 5
- Promotional poster for season five
- Hosted by: Brooke Lynn Hytes
- Judges: Brooke Lynn Hytes; Brad Goreski; Traci Melchor
- No. of contestants: 11
- Winner: The Virgo Queen
- Runner-up: Makayla Couture
- Miss Congeniality: Jaylene Tyme
- No. of episodes: 9

Release
- Original network: Crave (Canada); WOW Presents Plus (International)
- Original release: November 21, 2024 – January 16, 2025

Season chronology
- ← Previous; Season 4 Next → Season 6

The fifth season of Canada's Drag Race premiered on November 21, 2024. The season airs on Crave in Canada and on WOW Presents Plus internationally.

== Production ==
Crave announced that the series was renewed for a fifth season in November 2023, with a casting call taking place from November 9 to 23. Brooke Lynn Hytes, Brad Goreski, and Traci Melchor returned as the main judges.

Eleven contestants were announced on October 23, 2024, with a premiere for the season slated for November 21.

The season sees the return of "The Golden Beaver" twist, which was first introduced in the previous season. The Golden Beaver grants the maxi challenge winner the ability to save one of the bottom three competitors from lip syncing for their life.

== Contestants ==
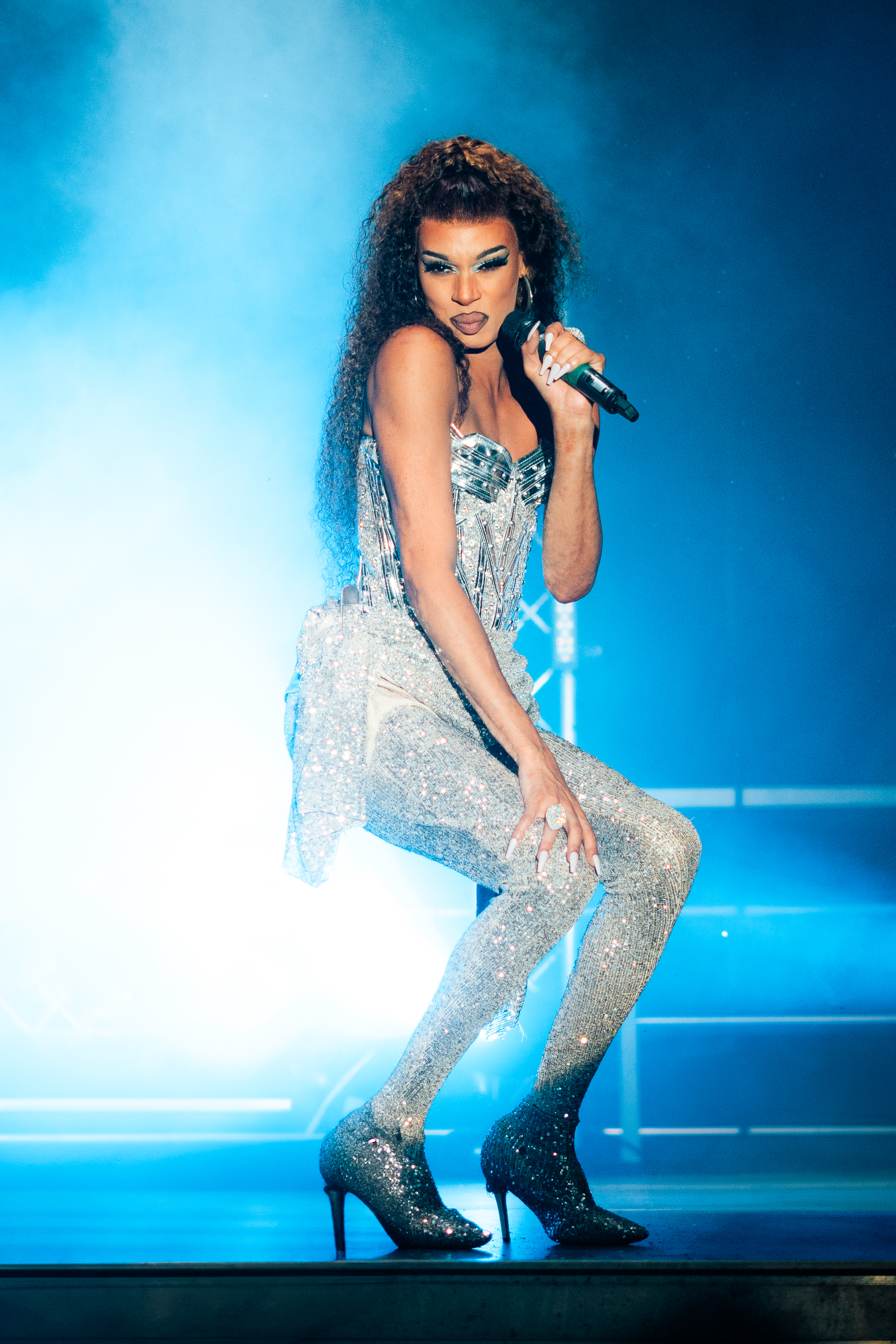
The winner, The Virgo Queen.

Canada's Drag Race season 5 contestants and their backgrounds (Note: All ages, names, with hometowns, and outcome are stated at time of filming.)
Contestant	Age	Hometown	Outcome
The Virgo Queen	25	Toronto, Ontario	Winner
Makayla Couture	21	Toronto, Ontario	Runner-up
Helena Poison	32	Toronto, Ontario	3rd place
Minhi Wang	39	Toronto, Ontario	3rd place
Perla	29	Toronto, Ontario	5th place
Xana	26	Vancouver, British Columbia	6th place
Uma Gahd	36	Montreal, Quebec	7th place
Jaylene Tyme	52	Vancouver, British Columbia	8th place (Note: Jaylene Tyme was voted Miss Congeniality by fellow contestants.)
Sanjina DaBish Queen	32	Toronto, Ontario	9th place
Tiffany Ann Co.	32	Vancouver, British Columbia	10th place
Tara Nova	23	St. John's, Newfoundland and Labrador	11th place

Footnotes

== Contestant progress ==
Legend:

The Virgo Queen won Canada's Drag Race season 5.
Makayla Couture was the runner-up.
Jaylene Tyme was voted Miss Congeniality (Miss C) by fellow contestants.
WIN indicates that the contestant won the challenge.
TOP2 indicates that the contestant was one of the two best performing in the challenge, but lost the lip sync to win it.
SAFE indicates that the contestant was declared safe by the judges.
BVR (Golden Beaver) indicates that the contestant received the Golden Beaver and was saved from the bottom two.
WDN (Wooden Beaver) indicates that the contestant received the Wooden Beaver through a chain created by the challenge winner and was saved from the bottom.
BTM (Bottom) indicates that the contestant was up for elimination.
ELIM (Eliminated) indicates that the contestant was eliminated.
Guest indicates that the contestant returned as a guest.

Contestants progress with placements in each episode
Contestant	Episode								
Contestant	1	2	3	4	5	6	7	8	9
The Virgo Queen	WIN	SAFE	WIN	SAFE	SAFE	BTM	BTM	SAFE	Winner
Makayla Couture	TOP2	SAFE	SAFE	BVR	WIN	BTM	SAFE	BTM	Runner-up
Helena Poison	SAFE	SAFE	SAFE	SAFE	BVR	WDN	SAFE	WIN	Eliminated
Minhi Wang	SAFE	SAFE	SAFE	WIN	SAFE	WDN	WIN	SAFE	Eliminated
Perla	SAFE	WIN	BTM	SAFE	SAFE	WDN	SAFE	ELIM	Guest
Xana	SAFE	BVR	SAFE	SAFE	BTM	WIN	ELIM		Guest
Uma Gahd	SAFE	SAFE	SAFE	BTM	SAFE	ELIM			Guest
Jaylene Tyme	SAFE	SAFE	BVR	SAFE	ELIM				Miss C
Sanjina DaBish Queen	SAFE	SAFE	SAFE	ELIM					Guest
Tiffany Ann Co.	SAFE	BTM	ELIM						Guest
Tara Nova	SAFE	ELIM							Guest

== Lip syncs ==
Legend:

The contestant won the lip sync to win the challenge.
The contestant was eliminated after their first time in the bottom.
The contestant was eliminated after their second time in the bottom.
The contestant won their Slay Off lip sync, gave their team a point and was declared safe from elimination.
The contestant won the Lip Sync for the Crown and was declared the winner of the season.

Episode	Top contestants			Song	Winner
1	Makayla Couture	vs.	The Virgo Queen	"Pretty Girl Era" (Lu Kala)	The Virgo Queen
Episode	Bottom contestants			Song	Eliminated
2	Tara Nova	vs.	Tiffany Ann Co.	"Fuck the Pain Away" (Peaches)	Tara Nova
Episode	Contestants			Song	Winner
3	Makayla Couture	vs.	Minhi Wang	"Too Hot" (Alanis Morissette)	Makayla Couture
3	Helena Poison	vs.	Jaylene Tyme	"San Francisco (Live at Carnegie Hall)" (Rufus Wainwright)	Helena Poison
3	Uma Gahd	vs.	Xana	"Heads Will Roll (A-Trak Remix)" (Yeah Yeah Yeahs)	Uma Gahd
3	The Virgo Queen	vs.	Tiffany Ann Co.	"Exes" (Tate McRae)	The Virgo Queen
3	Perla	vs.	Sanjina DaBish Queen	"Bad Bitches Don't Cry" (Priyanka ft. Ralph)	Sanjina DaBish Queen
3	Bottom contestants			Song	Eliminated
3	Perla	vs.	Tiffany Ann Co.	"Hot" (Avril Lavigne)	Tiffany Ann Co.
4	Sanjina DaBish Queen	vs.	Uma Gahd	"Contemporary Love" (Rêve)	Sanjina DaBish Queen
5	Jaylene Tyme	vs.	Xana	"Here Comes the Sunshine" (Love Inc.)	Jaylene Tyme
6	Makayla Couture vs. The Virgo Queen vs. Uma Gahd			"Hello" (Martin Solveig, Dragonette)	Uma Gahd
7	The Virgo Queen	vs.	Xana	"Taking Chances" (Céline Dion)	Xana
8	Makayla Couture	vs.	Perla	"Desperate Measures" (Marianas Trench)	Perla
Episode	Final contestants			Song	Winner
9	Makayla Couture	vs.	The Virgo Queen	"From This Moment On" (Shania Twain)	The Virgo Queen

== Beaver Progress ==
Legend:

The contestant won the Maxi Challenge and possessed the Golden Beaver to save one of the bottom queens.
The contestant won the Maxi Challenge and possessed the Wooden Beaver to save one of the queens in the bottom and start the chain.
The contestant received the Wooden Beaver, was saved from elimination, and had to pass it on to another queen that is in the bottom.
The contestant received the Golden Beaver and was saved from the bottom.
The contestant received the Wooden Beaver through a chain created by the challenge winner and was saved from the bottom.

Episode	Beaver Gifter	Bottom Queens	Saved
2	Perla	Tara Nova, Tiffany Ann Co. and Xana	Xana
3	The Virgo Queen	Perla, Jaylene Tyme and Tiffany Ann Co.	Jaylene Tyme
4	Minhi Wang	Makayla Couture, Sanjina DaBish Queen and Uma Gahd	Makayla Couture
5	Makayla Couture	Helena Poison, Jaylene Tyme and Xana	Helena Poison
6	Xana	Helena Poison, Makayla Couture, Minhi Wang, Perla, The Virgo Queen and Uma Gahd	Perla
6	Perla	Helena Poison, Makayla Couture, Minhi Wang, Perla, The Virgo Queen and Uma Gahd	Helena Poison
6	Helena Poison	Helena Poison, Makayla Couture, Minhi Wang, Perla, The Virgo Queen and Uma Gahd	Minhi Wang

== Guest judges ==
On November 1, 2024, it was announced Brooke Lynn Hytes, Traci Melchor, and Brad Goreski would be returning to the judging panel, along with various guest judges. Guest judges listed by order of appearance:

- Lu Kala, singer
- Peaches, feminist musician and producer
- Sarain Fox, activist and filmmaker
- Shea Couleé, contestant from RuPaul's Drag Race Season 9 and All Stars 7, and winner of All Stars 5
- Lauren Chan, model and editor
- Simone Denny, singer-songwriter
- Steph Tolev, comedian and actress
- Ts Madison, actress, activist, and judge on RuPaul's Drag Race
- Orville Peck, musician

=== Special guests ===
Guests who appeared in episodes, but did not judge on the main stage.

Episode 4

- Aleksandar Antonijevic, photographer
- Joanna Griffiths, businesswoman and CEO of Knix Wear Inc.

Episode 7

- Suki Doll, contestant from Canada's Drag Race Season 2

Episode 8

- Jimbo, contestant from Canada's Drag Race Season 1 and RuPaul's Drag Race: UK vs. the World Series 1, and winner of All Stars 8

Episode 9

- Jimbo, contestant from Canada's Drag Race Season 1 and UK vs. the World Series 1, and winner of All Stars 8
- Aleksandar Antonijevic, photographer
- John Diemer, recording engineer
- Hollywood Jade, choreographer
- Kitten Kaboodle, contestant and Miss Congeniality from Canada's Drag Race Season 4
- Venus, winner of Canada's Drag Race Season 4

== Episodes ==
No. overall	No. in season	Title	Original release date
39	1	"Go Off Queen"	November 21, 2024
Eleven new queens enter the workroom. For the first main challenge, the queens write, record, and perform verses to "Go Off Queen". The judges reveal that the queens will be awarded thorns and roses based on their entrance and runway looks, as well as for their performance in the main challenge. On the runway, category is You Oughta Know... Me. Jaylene Tyme, Makayla Couture and The Virgo Queen were awarded with roses and receive positive critiques. Perla, Tara Nova and Tiffany Ann Co. were awarded with thorns and receive negative critiques. It is then announced that Makayla Couture and The Virgo Queen are the top two queens of the week and will lip-sync for the win. They lip-sync to "Pretty Girl Era" by Lu Kala. After the lip-sync, The Virgo Queen is announced as the winner of the challenge. Brooke Lynn Hytes then announces that no one is going home.: Guest Judges: Lu Kala; Main Challenge: Write, record, and perform verses to "Go Off Queen"; Runway Theme: You Oughta Know... Me; Top Two: Makayla Couture and The Virgo Queen; Lip-Sync Song: "Pretty Girl Era" by Lu Kala; Challenge Winner: The Virgo Queen; Challenge Prize: A $5,000 cash tip courtesy of Gilead Sciences Canada; Eliminated: None
40	2	"Greetings Queenlings"	November 28, 2024
For this week's main challenge, the queens team up to film a PSA teaching aliens about life on Earth.: Manners - Helena Poison, Minhi Wang and Perla; Family - Sanjina DaBish Queen, Tara Nova, Uma Gahd and Xana; Sexuality - Jaylene Tyme, Makayla Couture, The Virgo Queen and Tiffany Ann Co.; On the runway, category is Time and Place. Helena Poison, Minhi Wang and Perla receive positive critiques, with Perla winning the challenge. Tara Nova, Tiffany Ann Co. and Xana receive negative critiques. Brooke reveals that the twist from the previous season is back: the winner of the main challenge receives the power of the Golden Beaver, granting them the ability to save one of the bottom three queens from lip syncing for their life. Perla uses the Golden Beaver to save Xana from the bottom two. Tara Nova and Tiffany Ann Co. lip-sync to "Fuck the Pain Away" by Peaches. Tiffany Ann Co. wins the lip-sync and Tara Nova is the first queen to sashay away.: Guest Judges: Peaches and Sarain Fox; Main Challenge: In teams, film a PSA teaching aliens about life on Earth; Runway Theme: Time and Place; Challenge Winner: Perla; Challenge Prize: A $5,000 cash tip courtesy of Safer Six; Bottom Two: Tara Nova and Tiffany Ann Co.; Lip-Sync Song: "Fuck the Pain Away" by Peaches; Eliminated: Tara Nova; Farewell Message: "Just like water, I must flow to the next River... We are a family! ♡"
41	3	"The Slayoffs: Teams Edition"	December 5, 2024
For this week's main challenge, the queens team up to participate in a lip-sync slay off extravaganza. Brooke Lynn Hytes reveals that each team will pick one person to lip-sync to each song. The winner of the lip-sync will earn a point for their team, and would be safe from elimination. The loser of the lip-sync would be eligible for possible elimination. The team who earns the most points at the end will all be safe from elimination. The losing queens on the losing team would then be in the bottom.: Team Perla - Jaylene Tyme, Makayla Couture, Perla, Tiffany Ann Co. and Uma Gahd; Team The Virgo Queen - Helena Poison, Minhi Wang, Sanjina DaBish Queen, The Virgo Queen and Xana; In the first round, Makayla Couture and Minhi Wang lip-sync to "Too Hot" by Alanis Morissette. Makayla Couture wins the lip-sync and earns a point for Team Perla. In the second round, Helena Poison and Jaylene Tyme lip-sync to "San Francisco (Live at Carnegie Hall)" by Rufus Wainwright. Helena Poison wins the lip-sync and earns a point for Team The Virgo Queen. In the third round, Uma Gahd and Xana lip-sync to "Heads Will Roll (A-Trak Remix)" by Yeah Yeah Yeahs. Uma Gahd wins the lip-sync and earns a point for Team Perla. In the fourth round, The Virgo Queen and Tiffany Ann Co. lip-sync to "Exes" by Tate McRae. The Virgo Queen wins the lip-sync and earns a point for Team The Virgo Queen. In the final round, Perla and Sanjina DaBish Queen lip-sync to "Bad Bitches Dont Cry" by Priyanka ft. Ralph. Sanjina DaBish Queen wins the lip-sync and earns the final point for Team The Virgo Queen. Team The Virgo Queen is then announced as the winning team, with The Virgo Queen winning the challenge. Team Perla is the losing team, with Jaylene Tyme, Perla and Tiffany Ann Co. being announced as the bottom three, due to them losing their lip-syncs. The Virgo Queen uses the Golden Beaver to save Jaylene Tyme from the bottom two. Perla and Tiffany Ann Co. lip-sync to "Hot" by Avril Lavigne. Perla wins the lip-sync and Tiffany Ann Co. sashays away.: Guest Judge: Shea Couleé; Main Challenge: In teams, participate in a lip-sync slay off extravaganza; Challenge Winner: The Virgo Queen; Challenge Prize: A $5,000 cash tip and a $5,000 donation to LGBT Youthline courtesy of Neutrogena; Bottom Two: Perla and Tiffany Ann Co.; Lip-Sync Song: "Hot" by Avril Lavigne; Eliminated: Tiffany Ann Co.; Farewell Message: As Tiff!
42	4	"Fast Fashion"	December 12, 2024
For this week's mini-challenge, the queens do a boudoir photoshoot. Sanjina DaBish Queen wins the mini-challenge. For the main challenge, the queens present two looks on the runway: Slow Mo Couture and Fast Fashion. On the runway, Helena Poison, Jaylene Tyme and Minhi Wang receive positive critiques, with Minhi Wang winning the challenge. Makayla Couture, Sanjina DaBish Queen and Uma Gahd receive negative critiques. Minhi Wang uses the Golden Beaver to save Makayla Couture from the bottom two. Sanjina DaBish Queen and Uma Gahd lip-sync to "Contemporary Love" by Rêve. Uma Gahd wins the lip-sync and Sanjina DaBish Queen sashays away.: Guest Judge: Lauren Chan; Mini-Challenge: Boudoir photoshoot; Mini-Challenge Winner: Sanjina DaBish Queen; Mini-Challenge Prize: A $2,500 cash tip courtesy of Knix; Main Challenge: Present two looks on the runway; Runway Themes: Slow Mo Couture and Fast Fashion; Challenge Winner: Minhi Wang; Challenge Prize: A trip for two to the Montréal Village; Bottom Two: Sanjina DaBish Queen and Uma Gahd; Lip-Sync Song: "Contemporary Love" by Rêve; Eliminated: Sanjina DaBish Queen; Farewell Message: "I♡U HOES so so so much! ♡ BUT... Virgo my beautiful mother, bring home the crown. Praaarapp!!!"
43	5	"The One Where They Went '90s"	December 19, 2024
For this week's mini-challenge, the queens get into quick drag and audition to be a '90s showcase supermodel. Uma Gahd wins the mini-challenge. For the main challenge, the queens write, record, and perform verses to "Duh" and "Not".: Backdoor Girls - Helena Poison, Jaylene Tyme, Minhi Wang and Uma Gahd performing "Duh"; VMXP - Makayla Couture, Perla, The Virgo Queen and Xana performing "Not"; On the runway, category is Grunge and Glamour. Makayla Couture, Perla and The Virgo Queen receive positive critiques, with Makayla Couture winning the challenge. Helena Poison, Jalene Tyme and Xana receive negative critiques. Makayla Couture uses the Golden Beaver to save Helena Poison from the bottom two. Jaylene Tyme and Xana lip-sync to "Here Comes the Sunshine" by Love Inc. Xana wins the lip-sync and Jaylene Tyme sashays away.: Guest Judge: Simone Denny; Mini-Challenge: Get into quick drag and audition to be a '90s showcase supermodel; Mini-Challenge Winner: Uma Gahd; Mini-Challenge Prize: A $2,500 cash tip courtesy of Shoefreaks; Main Challenge: Write, record, and perform verses to "Duh" and "Not"; Runway Theme: Grunge and Glamour; Challenge Winner: Makayla Couture; Challenge Prize: A $5,000 cash tip courtesy of Gilead Sciences Canada; Bottom Two: Jaylene Tyme and Xana; Lip-Sync Song: "Here Comes the Sunshine" by Love Inc.; Eliminated: Jaylene Tyme; Farewell Message: "~~Fuck you~~ Remember the power inside of you, it is tobe you! All my relations, the mother of Season 5 Jaylene ♡"
44	6	"Snatch Game"	December 26, 2024
For this week's mini-challenge, the queens read each other to filth. Helena Poison wins the mini-challenge. For the main challenge, the queens play the Snatch Game. Brad Goreski and Traci Melchor star as the celebrity contestants. The cast consisted of: Helena Poison as Jennifer Tilly; Makayla Couture as Oprah Winfrey; Minhi Wang as Chairman Mao; Perla as Mary-Kate Olsen; The Virgo Queen as Judge Lynn Toler; Uma Gahd as Dee Gruenig; Xana as Bettie Page; After the Snatch Game, Xana is announced as the winner of the challenge, and will possess the Wooden Beaver. On the runway, category is Alien Superstar. Brooke Lynn Hytes then reveals that Xana will have the power to save one queen with the Wooden Beaver. That queen will then choose another queen to save. This continues until there are three queens left. The three queens who don't receive the Wooden Beaver will be up for elimination. Xana uses the Wooden Beaver to save Perla, Perla uses the Wooden Beaver to save Helena Poison, and Helena Poison uses the Wooden Beaver to save Minhi Wang. As Makayla Couture, The Virgo Queen and Uma Gahd did not receive the Wooden Beaver, they are in the bottom three. They lip-sync to "Hello" by Martin Solveig and Dragonette. Makayla Couture and The Virgo Queen win the lip-sync and Uma Gahd sashays away.: Guest Judge: Steph Tolev; Mini-Challenge: Reading is Fundamental; Mini-Challenge Winner: Helena Poison; Mini-Challenge Prize: A $2,500 cash tip courtesy of The Men's Room; Main Challenge: Snatch Game; Runway Theme: Alien Superstar; Challenge Winner: Xana; Challenge Prize: A $5,000 cash tip courtesy of Cedars Campground; Bottom Three: Makayla Couture, The Virgo Queen and Uma Gahd; Lip-Sync Song: "Hello" by Martin Solveig and Dragonette; Eliminated: Uma Gahd; Farewell Message: "BE SO UNSTOPPABLE... THAT NOBODY CAN STOP YOU! GAHD BLESS! ｡☆°"
45	7	"The Devil Wore Custom"	January 2, 2025
For the main challenge, the queens have to design an outfit to be worn by Brooke Lynn. In addition, season 2's Suki Doll comes to offer advice and to actually help with constructing their outfits, for a fixed short amount of time each. On the runway, Brooke Lynn models the queen's designs and for the queens themselves, category is Wardrobe Malfunction. Helena Poison and Minhi Wang receive mostly positive critiques with Minhi Wang winning the challenge. Makayla Couture and Perla receive mixed critiques with both being declared safe. The Virgo Queen and Xana receive negative critiques and are both up for elimination. They lipsync to "Taking Chances" by Celine Dion. The Virgo Queen wins the lipsync and Xana sashays away.: Guest Judge: Sarain Fox; Main Challenge: Designing an outfit to be modeled by Brooke Lynn Heights; Runway Theme: Wardrobe Malfunction; Challenge Winner: Minhi Wang; Challenge Prize: A luxury trip for two to Punta Cana courtesy of Air Canada Vacations; Bottom Two: Xana and The Virgo Queen; Lip-Sync Song:"Taking Chances" by Celine Dion; Eliminated: Xana; Farewell Message: "Had so much fun antagonizing you. It was an honor. Season 5 sisters for life. heart Bye Slurs!°"
46	8	"What Just Happened?!"	January 9, 2025
For the mini challenge, the girls get in news anchor and get in front of a green screen to describe the scene being put on the background. The Virgo Queen wins the mini challenge. For the maxi challenge, the queens attend a talk show hosted by Brad which recaps the season. On the runway, category is Statuesque. Helena Poison and The Virgo Queen receive positive critiques with Helena Poison winning the challenge. Makayla Couture, Minhi Wang and Perla receive negative critiques, with Minhi Wang being declared safe. Makayla Couture and Perla lip-sync to "Desperate Measures by Marianas Trench. Makayla wins the lipsync and Perla sashays away.: Guest Judge: Ts Madison; Mini-Challenge: Reporting in front of a green screen; Mini-Challenge Winner: The Virgo Queen; Mini-Challenge Prize: A $2,500 cash tip courtesy of Swish Embassy; Main Challenge: Recap Talk Show hosted by Brad Goreski; Runway Theme: Statuesque; Challenge Winner: Helena Poison; Challenge Prize: A $5,000 cash tip courtesy of House of Jimbo; Bottom Two: Perla and Makayla Couture; Lip-Sync Song: "Desperate Measures" by Marianas Trench; Eliminated: Perla; Farewell Message: "Bye Cunts! JK, I Love You All So Much! Toronto Top 5 Forever! BTW, I Shit In All Your Alcoves heart XO Perla"
47	9	"Grand Finale"	January 16, 2025
For the final challenge of the season, the queens write, record, and perform their own debut single: Makayla Couture – To The Sky (Limitless); Minhi Wang – Wangderful; Helena Poison – Poison; The Virgo Queen – The Stars Have Aligned; The contestants also do a photoshoot with Season 4 winner Venus. The queens then walk the runway for a final time with the category Coronation Eleganza, and are joined by the eliminated queens. After the runway it is announced that Minhi Wang and Helena Poison are eliminated, making The Virgo Queen and Makayla Couture the top two. They lip-sync to "From This Moment On" by Shania Twain. They then announce that The Virgo Queen is the winner, making Makayla Couture the runner-up.: Guest Judge: Orville Peck; Main Challenge: Write and record, and perform your own debut single and do a photoshoot with Venus; Runway Theme: Coronation Eleganza; Miss Congeniality: Jaylene Tyme; Eliminated: Minhi Wang and Helena Poison; Lip Sync Song: "From This Moment On" by Shania Twain; Runner-up: Makayla Couture; Winner of Canada's Drag Race Season Five: The Virgo Queen
