= Uma Gahd =

Canadian drag performer

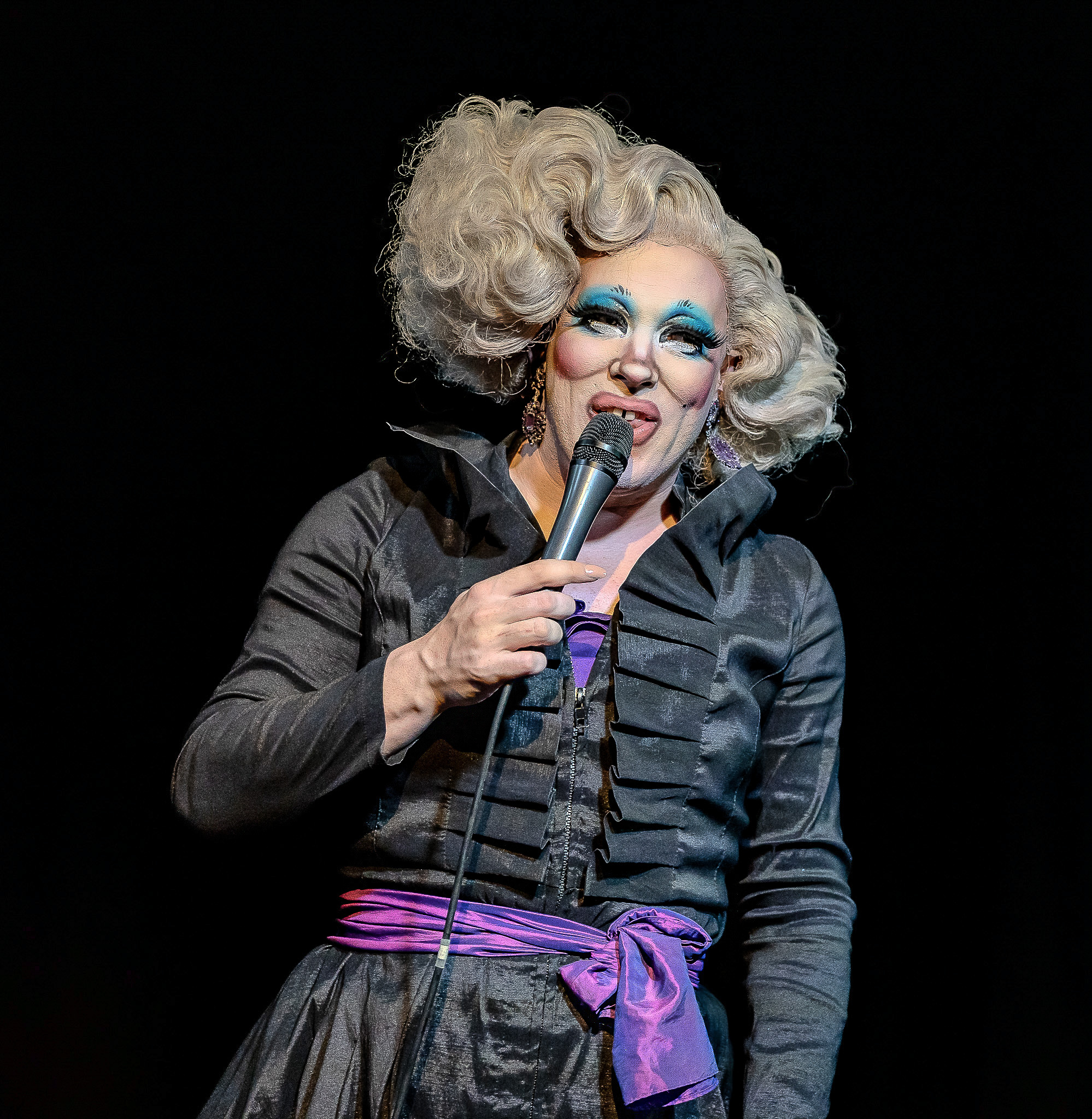
- Uma Gahd in 2025
- Born: Ryan Sauvé
- Occupation: Drag queen
- Television: Canada's Drag Race

Uma Gahd is the stage name of Ryan Sauvé, a Canadian drag queen who competed on the fifth season of Canada's Drag Race. She was eliminated in the sixth episode, the Snatch Game, following her impersonation of rainbow sponge saleswoman Dee Gruening, finishing in 7th place. Her drag comedy play Are You There, Margaret? It's Me, Gahd appeared at the Edinburgh Fringe Festival. She co-founded the House of Laureen, and co-created a show at Montreal's MAI that "focused on inclusivity" for performers and attendees.

== Filmography ==
- Canada's Drag Race (season 5, 7th place; 2024)

== Theatre ==
- Are You There, Margaret? It's Me, Gahd
