= List of Canada's Drag Race episodes =

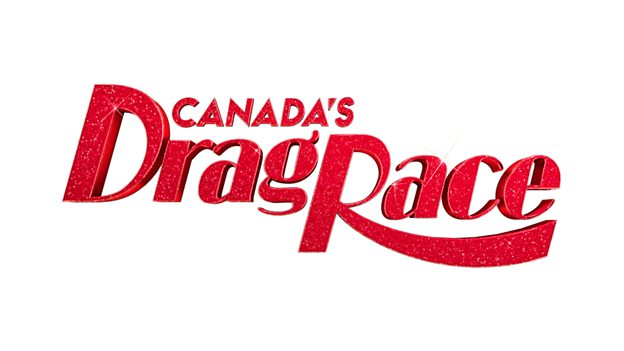
Logo for Canada's Drag Race

Canada's Drag Race is a Canadian reality competition streaming television series, based on America's RuPaul's Drag Race. The series is produced by Blue Ant Studios and premiered on Crave in Canada and WOW Presents Plus internationally on July 2, 2020. The show documents Canadian drag queen Brooke Lynn Hytes' search of the next "Canadian Drag Superstar". In January 2021, the show was renewed for a second season, which began airing in October. In November 2021, the show was renewed for a third season, which began airing in July 2022.

== Series overview ==
Season	Episodes	Originally released	
Season	Episodes	First released	Last released
1	10	July 2, 2020	September 3, 2020
2	10	October 14, 2021	December 16, 2021
3	9	July 14, 2022	September 8, 2022
4	9	November 16, 2023	January 11, 2024
5	9	November 21, 2024	January 16, 2025
6	9	November 20, 2025	January 15, 2026

== Episodes ==
=== Season 1 (2020) ===
Season 1 aired from July 2, 2020 to September 3, 2020. The season included Brooke Lynn Hytes, Stacey McKenzie, and Jeffrey Bowyer-Chapman as judges. In May 2020, Anastarzia Anaquway, BOA, Ilona Verley, Jimbo, Juice Boxx, Kiara, Kyne, Lemon, Priyanka, Rita Baga, Scarlett BoBo, and Tynomi Banks were revealed as the twelve competing queens for the first season. In the season finale, Priyanka won the competition, with Rita Baga and Scarlett BoBo as runners-up.

No. overall	No. in season	Title	Original release date
1	1	"Eh-laganza Eh-xtravaganza"	July 2, 2020
2	2	"Her-itage Moments"	July 9, 2020
3	3	"Not Sorry Aboot It"	July 16, 2020
4	4	"Single-Use Queens"	July 23, 2020
5	5	"Snatch Game"	July 30, 2020
6	6	"Star Sixty-Nine"	August 6, 2020
7	7	"Miss Loose Jaw"	August 13, 2020
8	8	"Welcome to the Family"	August 20, 2020
9	9	"The Snow Ball"	August 27, 2020
10	10	"U Wear It Well"	September 3, 2020

=== Season 2 (2021) ===
For the second season, Brooke Lynn Hytes remained as a judge, while Stacey McKenzie and Jeffrey Bowyer-Chapman were replaced by Brad Goreski, Amanda Brugel, and Traci Melchor. The twelve competitors were revealed to be Adriana, Beth, Eve 6000, Gia Metric, Icesis Couture, Kendall Gender, Kimora Amour, Océane Aqua-Black, Pythia, Suki Doll, Stephanie Prince, and Synthia Kiss. Season 2 started airing on October 14, 2021, and concluded on December 16, 2021, with Icesis Couture, Kendall Gender, and Pythia as finalists. Icesis Couture took the title as "Canada's Next Drag Superstar."

No. overall	No. in season	Title	Original release date
11	1	"Lost and Fierce"	October 14, 2021
12	2	"Under the Big Top"	October 21, 2021
13	3	"Screech"	October 28, 2021
14	4	"Snatch Game"	November 4, 2021
15	5	"Bye Flop"	November 11, 2021
16	6	"The Sinner's Ball"	November 19, 2021
17	7	"The Roast of Brooke Lynn Hytes"	November 26, 2021
18	8	"Prom"	December 3, 2021
19	9	"The Reunion"	December 9, 2021
20	10	"Queen of the North"	December 16, 2021

=== Season 3 (2022) ===
For the third season, Brooke Lynn Hytes remained as a judge alongside Goreski and Melchor. Brugel did not return to the judges panel. The twelve competitors were revealed to be Bombae, Chelazon Leroux, Gisèle Lullaby, Halal Bae, Irma Gerd, Jada Shada Hudson, Kaos, Kimmy Couture, Lady Boom Boom, Miss Fiercalicious, Miss Moço, and Vivian Vanderpuss. Season 3 premiered on July 14, 2022, and concluded on September 8. Gisèle Lullaby won the competition with Jada Shada Hudson as runner-up.

No. overall	No. in season	Title	Original release date
21	1	"Sidewalk to Catwalk"	July 14, 2022
22	2	"The Who-Knows"	July 21, 2022
23	3	"Ruets"	July 28, 2022
24	4	"Bitch Stole My Look"	August 4, 2022
25	5	"Snatch Game"	August 11, 2022
26	6	"Cosmetic Queens"	August 18, 2022
27	7	"Squirrels Trip: The Rusical"	August 25, 2022
28	8	"Masquerade Ball"	September 1, 2022
29	9	"True North Strong (and Fierce)"	September 8, 2022

=== Season 4 (2023–2024) ===
No. overall	No. in season	Title	Original release date
30	1	"Premiere Ball"	November 16, 2023
31	2	"QV-She"	November 23, 2023
32	3	"OH-SHE-GAGGIN"	November 30, 2023
33	4	"Out of the Closet"	December 7, 2023
34	5	"Snatch Game"	December 14, 2023
35	6	"Lip Sync Slay Offs"	December 21, 2023
36	7	"From Drags to Riches: The Rusical"	December 28, 2023
37	8	"A Star Is Born"	January 4, 2024
38	9	"Grand Finale"	January 11, 2024

=== Season 5 (2024–2025) ===
No. overall	No. in season	Title	Original release date
39	1	"Go Off Queen"	November 21, 2024
40	2	"Greetings Queenlings"	November 28, 2024
41	3	"The Slayoffs: Teams Edition"	December 5, 2024
42	4	"Fast Fashion"	December 12, 2024
43	5	"The One Where They Went '90s"	December 19, 2024
44	6	"Snatch Game"	December 26, 2024
45	7	"The Devil Wore Custom"	January 2, 2025
46	8	"What Just Happened?!"	January 9, 2025
47	9	"Grand Finale"	January 16, 2025

=== Season 6 (2025–2026) ===
No. overall	No. in season	Title	Original release date
48	1	"Not Sorry Aboot It"	November 20, 2025
49	2	"Yachty Girls"	November 27, 2025
50	3	"Pick Your Poison"	December 4, 2025
51	4	"Reading Battles are Back Back Back Again"	December 11, 2025
52	5	"The Shade"	December 18, 2025
53	6	"Slayoffs"	December 25, 2025
54	7	"Paris (Ontario) Fashion Week"	January 1, 2026
55	8	"Charisma, Uniqueness, Nerve, and Talent"	January 8, 2026
56	9	"Pop Queens of the North"	January 15, 2026

=== Season 6 (2026–2027) ===
No. overall	No. in season	Title	Original release date
57	1	TBA	November 19, 2026
