= Sidewalk to Catwalk =

- Canada's Drag Race episode
- Episode no.: Season 3 Episode 1
- Original air date: July 14, 2022

Guest appearance
- Monika Schnarre (guest judge)

Episode chronology
← Previous "Queen of the North"	Next → "The Who-Knows"
- Canada's Drag Race season 3

"Sidewalk to Catwalk" is the premiere episode of the third season of the Canadian reality competition television series Canada's Drag Race, which aired on July 14, 2022 on the television network Crave. In this episode the queens model a streetwear runway look before destroying it to create a new outfit. Monika Schnarre is the guest judge who is joined by regular panelists Brooke Lynn Hytes, Brad Goreski and Traci Melchor.

The episode was nominated for two Canadian Screen Awards at the 11th Canadian Screen Awards, winning one.

== Episode ==
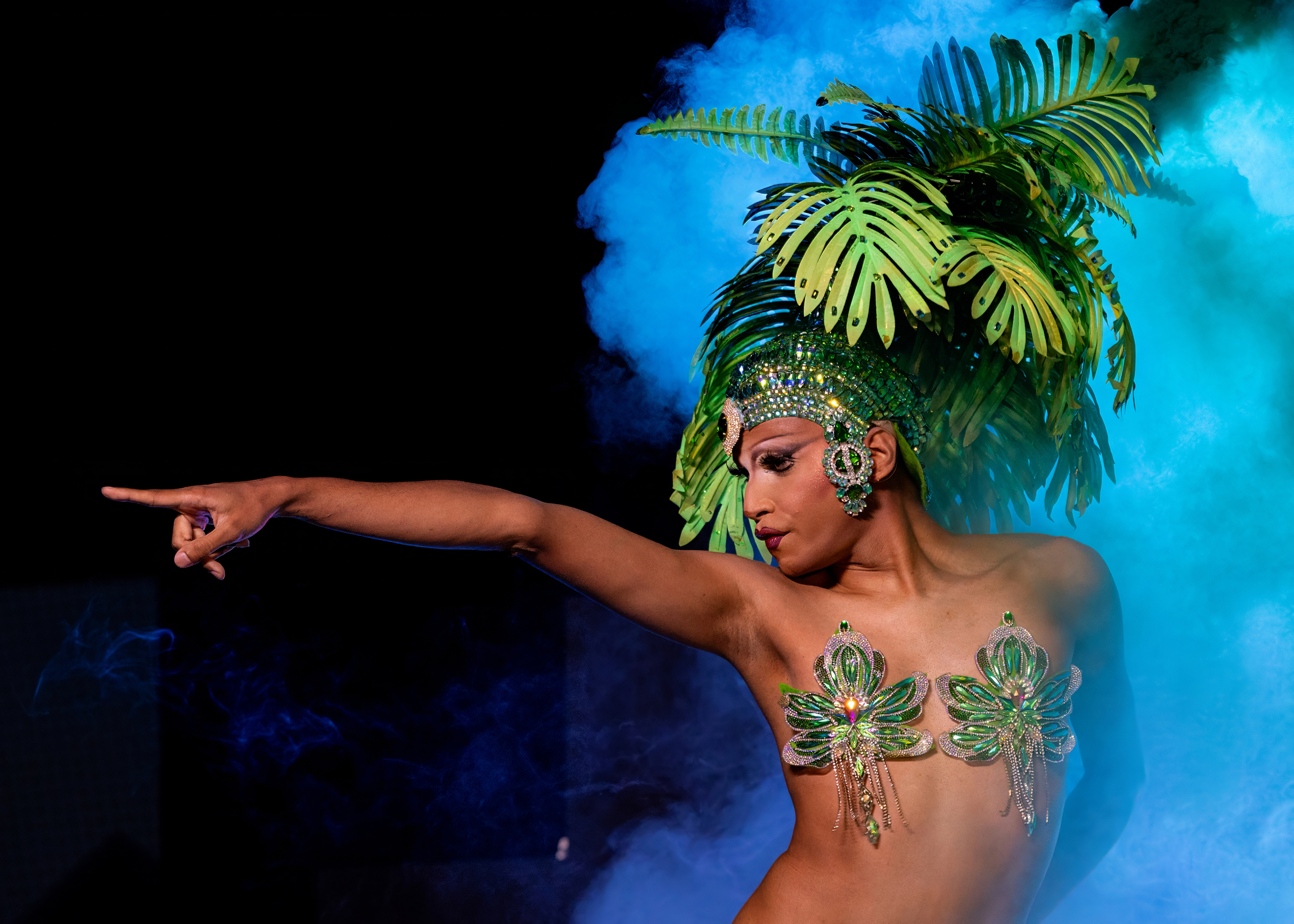
Bombae (pictured in 2025) is the first queen to enter the workroom and wins the mini challenge.

The episode begins with twelve new queens entering the workroom for the first time. They are Bombae from Toronto; Kimmy Couture from Ottawa, who is the drag daughter of season two winner Icesis Couture and the first transgender contestant on Canada's Drag Race; Chelazon Leroux from Saskatoon, the first contestant from Saskatchewan; Jada Shada Hudson from Toronto; Miss Moço from Toronto; Gisèle Lullaby from Montreal; Kaos from Calgary; Miss Fiercalicious from Toronto; Vivian Vanderpuss from Victoria, British Columbia; Lady Boom Boom from Montreal; Irma Gerd from St. John's, Newfoundland and Labrador, who is the first contestant from Atlantic Canada; and Halal Bae from Toronto.

For the mini challenge, the contestants walk in the Sissy That Sidewalk rooftop fashion show, modeling Canadian streetwear looks. Bombae wins the challenge, winning $2,500 courtesy of the Rupaul's Drag Race Werq the World Tour.

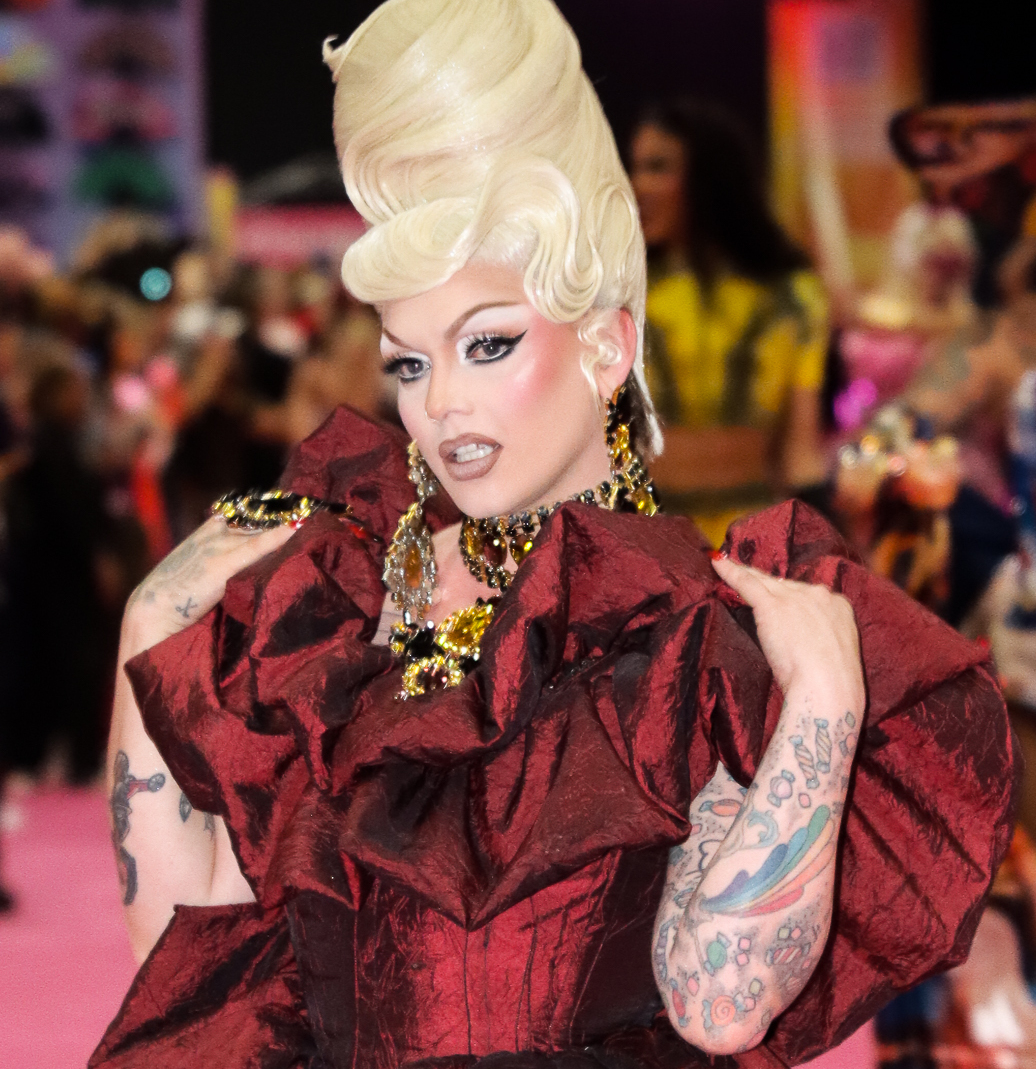
Lady Boom Boom (pictured in 2024) wins the maxi challenge.

For the maxi challenge the queens have to make new "catwalk couture" runway looks using their streetwear looks from the mini challenge. On the runway regular panelists Brooke Lynn Hytes, Brad Goreski and Traci Melchor are joined by guest judge Monika Schnarre.

Jada Shada Hudson, Kaos and Lady Boom Boom are the best performers of the week, while Halal Bae, Miss Fiercalicious and Miss Moço are the worst. Lady Boom Boom wins the challenge, winning $5,000 courtesy of Palm Holdings. Jada Shada Hudson, Kaos, and Miss Fiercalicious are safe, leaving Halal Bae and Miss Moço up for elimination. They face off in a lip sync to "Beauty and a Beat" by Justin Bieber featuring Nicki Minaj. Miss Moço wins the lip sync and Halal Bae is eliminated.

== Reception ==
The episode was nominated for two Canadian Screen Awards at the 11th Canadian Screen Awards. Andrew Kinsella won for Best Production Design or Art Direction, Non-Fiction, while the other nomination was for Peter Topalovic for Best Picture Editing, Reality/Competition.
