= Snatch Game (Canada's Drag Race season 3) =

- Canada's Drag Race episode
- Episode no.: Season 3 Episode 5
- Original air date: August 11, 2022

Guest appearance
- Sarain Fox

Episode chronology
← Previous "Bitch Stole My Look"	Next → "Cosmetic Queens"
- Canada's Drag Race season 3

"Snatch Game" is the fifth episode of the third season of the Canadian reality competition television series Canada's Drag Race, which aired on August 11, 2022, on the television network Crave. The episode sees contestants improvising celebrity impersonations while playing the Snatch Game. Sarain Fox is the guest judge, who is joined by regular panelists Brooke Lynn Hytes, Brad Goreski, and Traci Melchor.

== Episode ==
For the mini-challenge the queens read each other, inspired by the documentary Paris is Burning. Lady Boom Boom wins the challenge, winning $2,500 courtesy of the Men's Room.

For the maxi challenge the queens will compete in the annual Snatch Game, where they must improvise as celebrity characters on a panel, a parody of Match Game. The celebrities impersonated are:

- Bombae as Aziz Ansari
- Gisèle Lullaby as Marie Curie
- Irma Gerd as Marilyn Monroe
- Jada Shada Hudson as Saucy Santana
- Kimmy Couture as Ariana Grande
- Lady Boom Boom as Mado Lamotte
- Miss Fiercalicious as Kourtney Kardashian
- Vivian Vanderpuss as Tammy Faye Messner

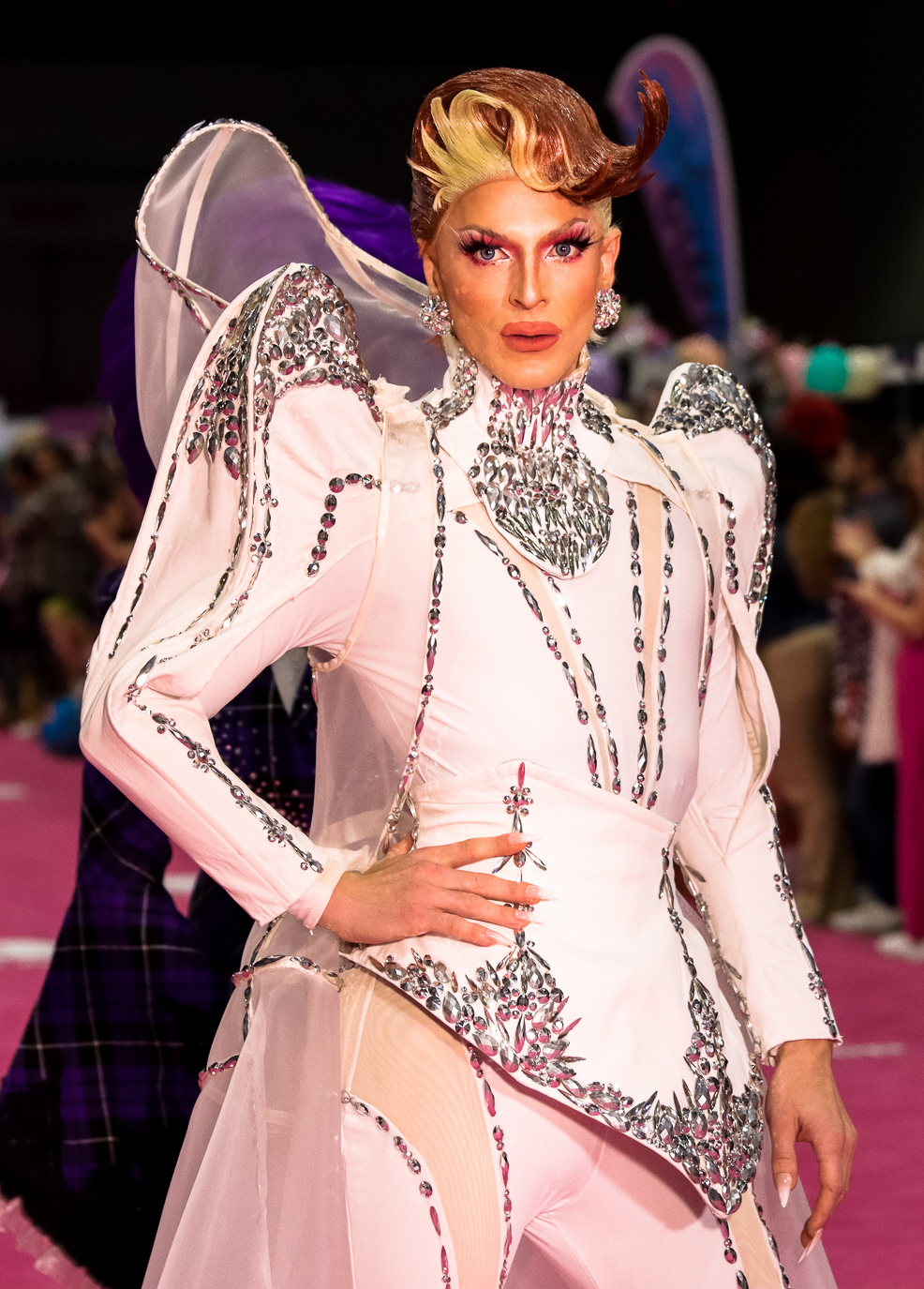
Gisèle Lullaby (pictured in 2023) wins the Snatch Game for her portrayal of Nobel-prize winning scientist Marie Curie.

On the runway regular panellists Brooke Lynn Hytes, Brad Goreski, and Traci Melchor are joined by guest judge Sarain Fox. The runway theme is Periodic Table of Elements. Gisèle Lullaby, Irma Gerd and Vivian Vanderpuss are the best performers of the week, while Bombae, Kimmy Couture and Lady Boom Boom are the worst.

Gisèle Lullaby wins the challenge, winning $5,000 courtesy of Palm Holdings. Irma Gerd, Vivian Vanderpuss, and Bombae are safe. Kimmy Couture and Lady Boom Boom are up for elimination and lip sync to "Run Away with Me" by Carly Rae Jepsen. Kimmy Couture wins the lip sync and Lady Boom Boom is eliminated.

== See also ==
- Snatch Game (Canada's Drag Race season 1)
- Snatch Game (Canada's Drag Race season 2)
