= Squirrels Trip: The Rusical =

- Canada's Drag Race episode
- Episode no.: Season 3 Episode 7
- Original air date: August 25, 2022

Guest appearances
- Jeremy Dutcher (guest judge); Hollywood Jade

Episode chronology
← Previous "Cosmetic Queens"	Next → "The Masquerade Ball"
- Canada's Drag Race season 3

"Squirrels Trip: The Rusical" is the seventh episode of the third season of the Canadian reality competition television series Canada's Drag Race, which aired on August 25, 2022 on the television network Crave. In this episode the queens act and lipsync in a Rusical. Jeremy Dutcher is the guest judge who is joined by regular panelists Brooke Lynn Hytes, Brad Goreski and Traci Melchor.

The episode won three Canadian Screen Awards at the 11th Canadian Screen Awards in April 2023.

== Episode ==
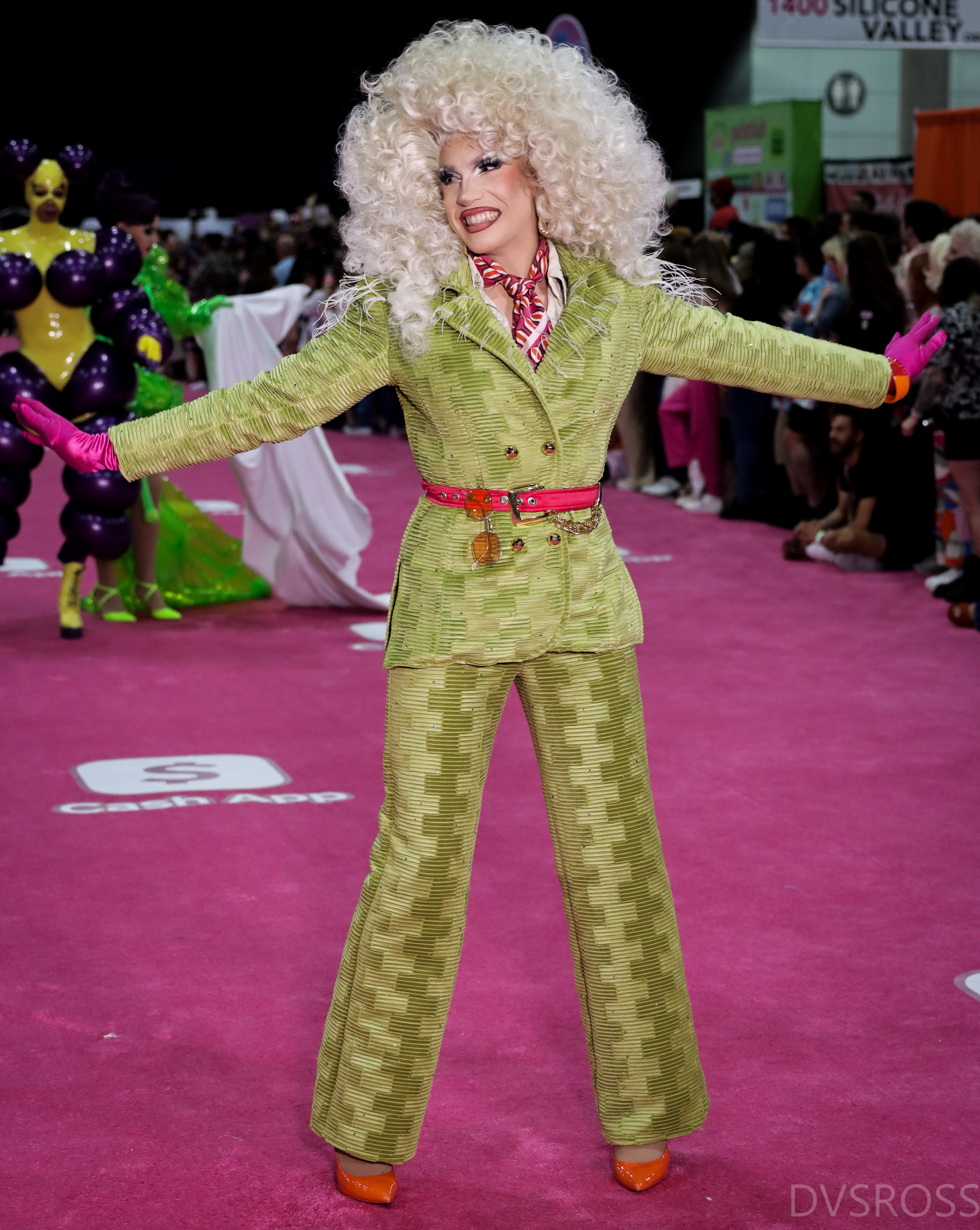
Vivian Vanderpuss (pictured in 2023) won the maxi challenge.

For the mini challenge, the contestants get into "quick actress drag" to audition for a role in a new superhero movie, Superqueens. Kimmy Couture wins the challenge, receiving $2,500 courtesy of Made.

For the maxi challenge the queens act and lip sync in the rusical "Squirrels Trip: The Rusical", about women who "hate each other". The queens record their vocals with Brad Goreski and then learn choreography from Hollywood Jade. On the runway regular panelists Brooke Lynn Hytes, Brad Goreski and Traci Melchor are joined by guest judge Jeremy Dutcher. The runway theme is "Dystopian Drag".

Kimmy Couture, Miss Fiercalicious, and Vivian Vanderpuss are the best performers of the week, while Gisèle Lullaby, Irma Gerd, and Jada Shada Hudson are the worst. Vivian Vanderpuss is declared the winner of the challenge, also receiving $2,500 from Made. Kimmy Couture, Miss Fiercalicious, and Jada Shada Hudson are safe, while Gisèle Lullaby and Irma Gerd are up for elimination. They face off in a lip-sync contest to "Love Is" by Alannah Myles. Gisèle Lullaby is declared the winner and Irma Gerd is eliminated from the competition.

== Production ==
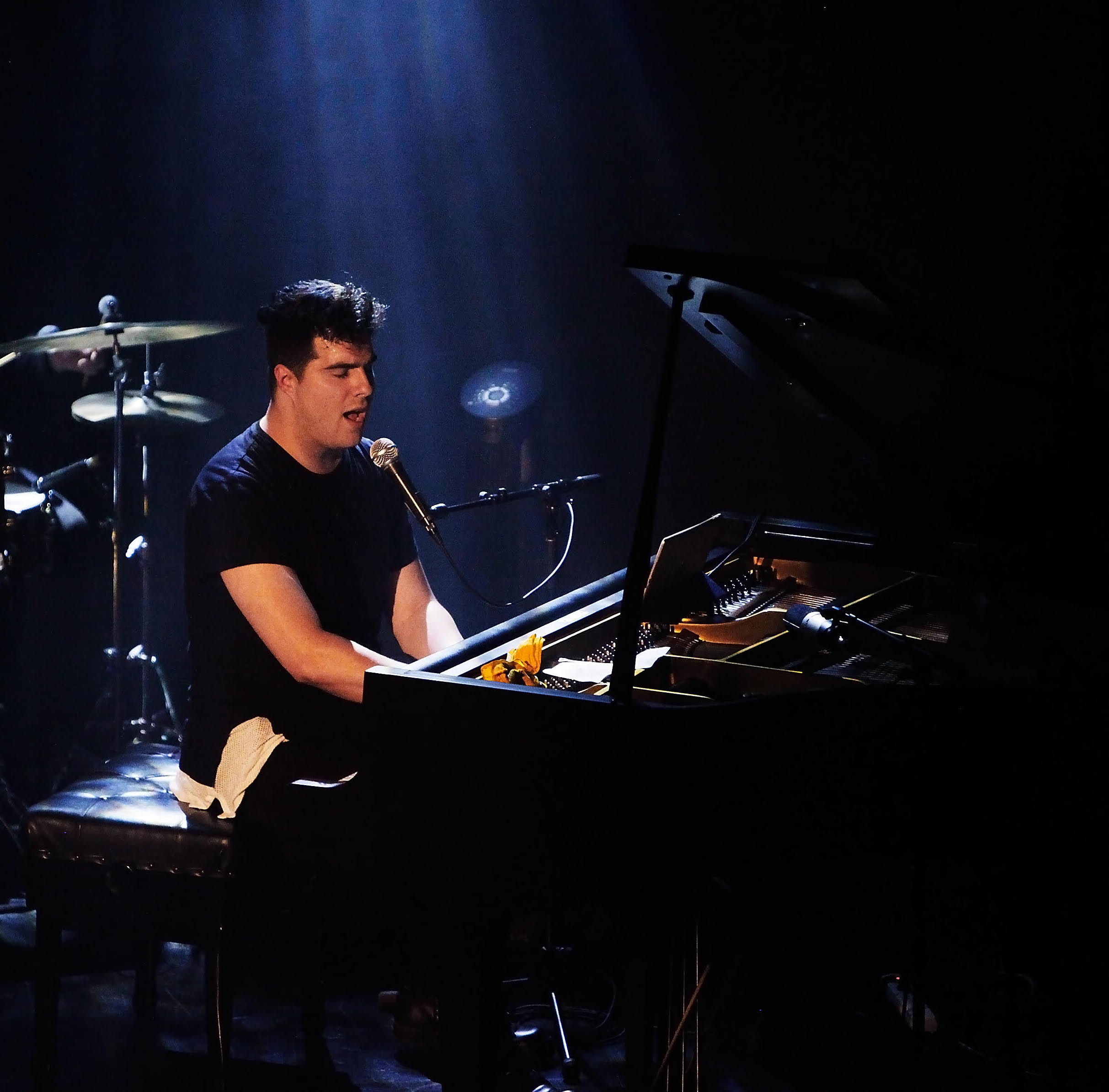
Jeremy Dutcher is a guest judge.

The episode first aired on August 25, 2022.

The rusical was released as an audio single for digital download and streaming following the episode.

== Reception ==
At the 11th Canadian Screen Awards in April 2023 the episode won three different Canadian Screen Awards. It won Best Direction, Reality/Competition for Shelagh O'Brien; Best Writing, Lifestyle or Reality/Competition for Brandon Ash-Mohammed, Trevor Boris, Spencer Fritz, and Kevin Hazlehurst; and Best Sound, Lifestyle, Reality or Entertainment for John Diemer, Scott Brachmayer, Rosie Eberhard, Levi Linton, Rob Taylor, Alastair Sims, and Eric Leigh.

In a 2025 ranking of every rusical in Drag Race, Vulture ranked "Squirrels Trip" 10th out of 47 rusicals. Vulture called the rusical "an underrated gem" and specifically praised Vivian Vanderpuss's and Kimmy Couture's performances. It was also the highest ranked Canadian rusical.
