= The Masquerade Ball (Canada's Drag Race) =

- Canada's Drag Race episode
- Episode no.: Season 3 Episode 8
- Original air date: September 1, 2022

Guest appearance
- Lesley Hampton (guest judge)

Episode chronology
← Previous "Squirrels Trip: The Rusical"	Next → "True North Strong (and Fierce)"
- Canada's Drag Race season 3

"The Masquerade Ball" is the eighth episode of the third season of the Canadian reality competition television series Canada's Drag Race, which aired on September 1, 2022 on the television network Crave. In this episode the queens model two outfits and create a third outfit inspired by masquerade balls for the ball challenge. Lesley Hampton is the guest judge who is joined by regular panelists Brooke Lynn Hytes, Brad Goreski and Traci Melchor.

The episode was nominated for a Canadian Screen Award for Best Picture Editing, Reality/Competition at the 11th Canadian Screen Awards.

== Episode ==
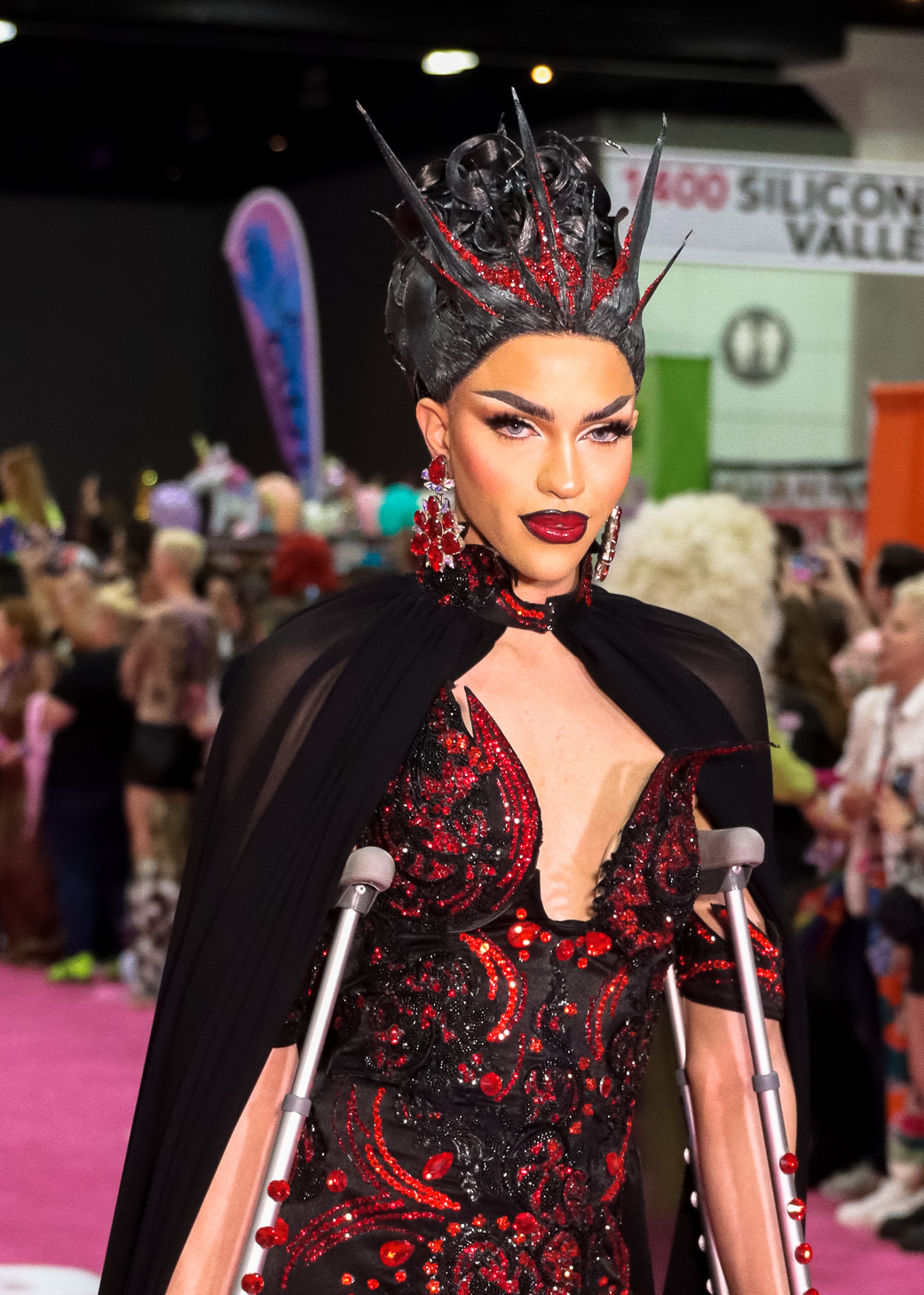
Miss Fiercalicious (pictured in 2023) wins the challenge.

For the maxi challenge the queens have to compete in a ball challenge. They need to model two runway looks in the categories "Masc For Mascara" (a masculine or butch gender bending look) and "In-Cog-SHEdo" (a look that includes a reveal), then create a new runway look that incorporates a mask in the style of a masquerade ball. On the runway regular panelists Brooke Lynn Hytes, Brad Goreski and Traci Melchor are joined by guest judge Lesley Hampton.

Gisèle Lullaby, Jada Shada Hudson, and Miss Fiercalicious receive praise for their performances, while Kimmy Couture and Vivian Vanderpuss receive negative critiques. Miss Fiercalicious wins the challenge, winning $5,000 courtesy of Snag Tights. Gisèle Lullaby and Jada Shada Hudson are safe, leaving Kimmy Couture and Vivian Vanderpuss up for elimination. They face off in a lip sync to "CTRL + ALT + DEL" by Rêve. Kimmy Couture wins the lip sync and Vivian Vanderpuss is eliminated.

== Fashion ==
Miss Fiercalicious's "Masc For Mascara" look pays homage to make-up artist and costume designer Mathu Andersen, while her "In-Cog-SHEdo" look pays homage to Josephine Baker. Gisèle Lullaby's "Masc For Mascara" look makes references to Madonna's Jean Paul Gaultier executive corset look from the “Express Yourself” video and the Blonde Ambition tour with cartoon sailor Popeye.

== Reception ==
At the 11th Canadian Screen Awards Lindsay Ragone was nominated for a Canadian Screen Award in the category Best Picture Editing, Reality/Competition.
