= Canada's Drag Race season 3 =

2022 season of Canada's Drag Race

Canada's Drag Race
- Season 3
- Promotional poster for season three
- Hosted by: Brooke Lynn Hytes
- Judges: Brooke Lynn Hytes; Brad Goreski; Traci Melchor
- No. of contestants: 12
- Winner: Gisèle Lullaby
- Runner-up: Jada Shada Hudson
- Miss Congeniality: Vivian Vanderpuss
- No. of episodes: 9

Release
- Original network: Crave (Canada); BBC Three (United Kingdom); WOW Presents Plus (International)
- Original release: July 14 – September 8, 2022

Season chronology
- ← Previous; Season 2 Next → Season 4

The third season of Canada's Drag Race premiered on July 14 and concluded on September 8, 2022. The season airs on Crave in Canada, BBC Three in the United Kingdom and WOW Presents Plus internationally.

Casting for the third season started late 2021 and the twelve contestants were announced on June 15, 2022.

The winner of the third season of Canada's Drag Race was Gisèle Lullaby, with Jada Shada Hudson as runner-up. Vivian Vanderpuss was named Miss Congeniality, although her win was announced by the producers on the show's social media channels rather than in the finale episode.

Following the death of Queen Elizabeth II on September 8, 2022, the broadcast of the finale was delayed in the United Kingdom during the period of national mourning.

== Contestants ==
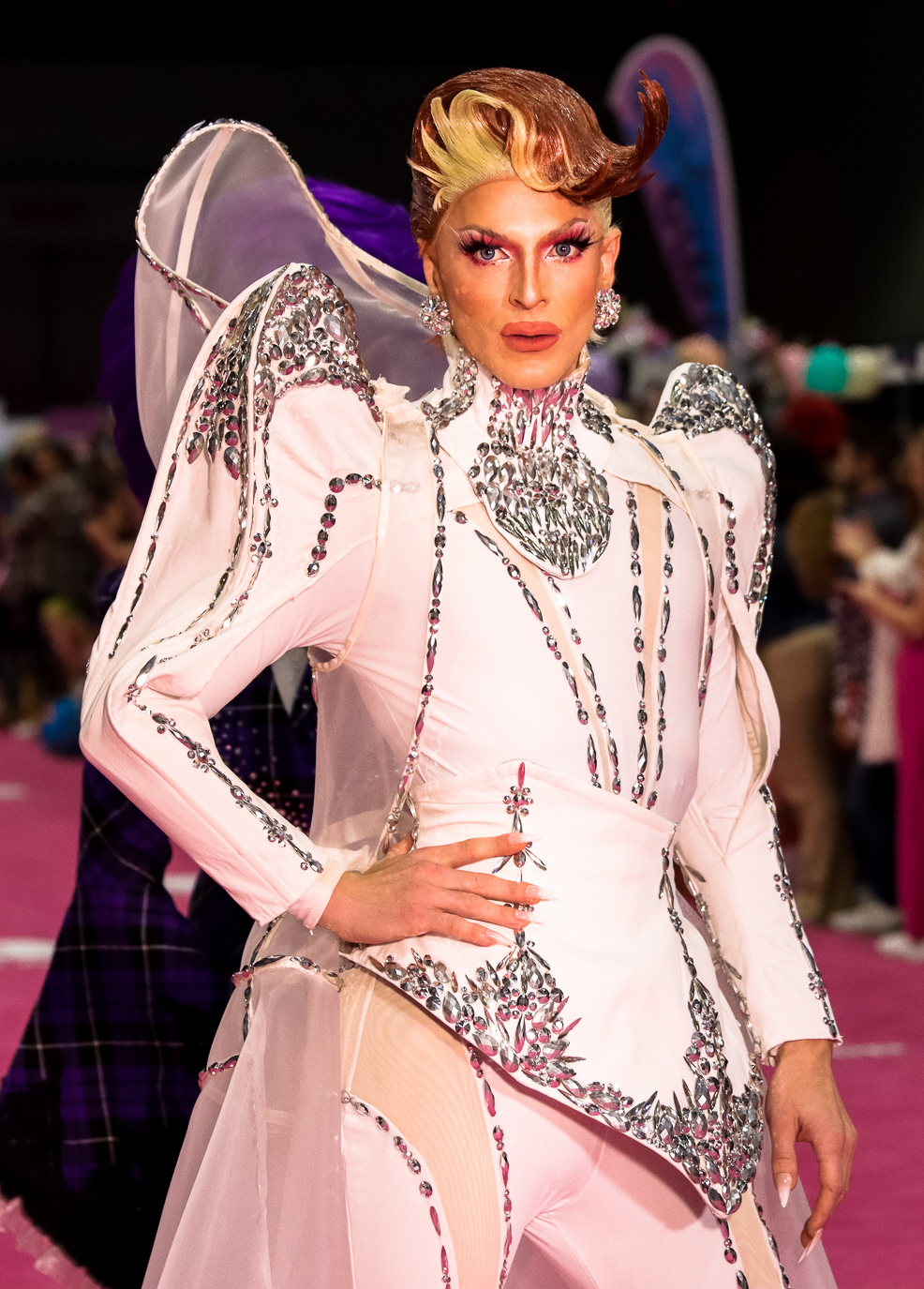
The winner, Gisèle Lullaby.

Canada's Drag Race season 3 contestants and their backgrounds (Note: All ages, names, with hometowns, and outcome are stated at time of filming.)
Contestant	Age	Hometown	Outcome
Gisèle Lullaby	33	Montreal, Quebec	Winner
Jada Shada Hudson	37	Toronto, Ontario	Runner-up
Kimmy Couture	25	Ottawa, Ontario	3rd place
Miss Fiercalicious	25	Toronto, Ontario	3rd place
Vivian Vanderpuss	29	Victoria, British Columbia	5th place (Note: Vivian Vanderpuss was voted Miss Congeniality on the official Canada's Drag Race Instagram page after the finale aired.)
Irma Gerd	32	St. John's, Newfoundland and Labrador	6th place
Bombae	29	Toronto, Ontario	7th place
Lady Boom Boom	25	Montreal, Quebec	8th place
Kaos	27	Calgary, Alberta	9th place
Chelazon Leroux	22	Saskatoon, Saskatchewan	10th place
Miss Moço	35	Toronto, Ontario	11th place
Halal Bae	33	Toronto, Ontario	12th place

Footnotes

== Contestant progress ==
Legend:

Gisèle Lullaby won Canada's Drag Race season 3.
Jada Shada Hudson was the runner-up.
Vivian Vanderpuss was voted Miss Congeniality (Miss C) after the show aired.
WIN indicates that the contestant won the challenge.
SAFE indicates that the contestant was declared safe by the judges.
BTM (Bottom) indicates that the contestant was up for elimination.
ELIM (Eliminated) indicates that the contestant was eliminated.
Guest indicates that the contestant returned as a guest.

Contestants progress with placements in each episode
Contestant	Episode								
Contestant	1	2	3	4	5	6	7	8	9
Gisèle Lullaby	SAFE	SAFE	SAFE	WIN	WIN	SAFE	BTM	SAFE	Winner
Jada Shada Hudson	SAFE	BTM	WIN	BTM	SAFE	SAFE	SAFE	SAFE	Runner-up
Kimmy Couture	SAFE	WIN	SAFE	SAFE	BTM	SAFE	SAFE	BTM	Eliminated
Miss Fiercalicious	SAFE	SAFE	BTM	SAFE	SAFE	WIN	SAFE	WIN	Eliminated
Vivian Vanderpuss	SAFE	SAFE	SAFE	SAFE	SAFE	SAFE	WIN	ELIM	Miss C
Irma Gerd	SAFE	SAFE	SAFE	SAFE	SAFE	BTM	ELIM		Guest
Bombae	SAFE	SAFE	SAFE	SAFE	SAFE	ELIM			Guest
Lady Boom Boom	WIN	SAFE	SAFE	SAFE	ELIM				Guest
Kaos	SAFE	SAFE	SAFE	ELIM					Guest
Chelazon Leroux	SAFE	SAFE	ELIM						Guest
Miss Moço	BTM	ELIM							Guest
Halal Bae	ELIM								Guest

== Lip syncs ==
Legend:

The contestant was eliminated after their first time in the bottom.
The contestant was eliminated after their second time in the bottom.
The contestant won the Lip Sync for the Crown and was declared the winner of the season.

Episode	Contestants			Song	Eliminated
1	Halal Bae	vs.	Miss Moço	"Beauty and a Beat" (Justin Bieber ft. Nicki Minaj)	Halal Bae
2	Jada Shada Hudson	vs.	Miss Moço	"High School Confidential" (Rough Trade)	Miss Moço
3	Chelazon Leroux	vs.	Miss Fiercalicious	"Don't Call Me Baby" (Kreesha Turner)	Chelazon Leroux
4	Jada Shada Hudson	vs.	Kaos	"Stranger in My House (Thunderpuss Radio Mix)" (Tamia)	Kaos
5	Kimmy Couture	vs.	Lady Boom Boom	"Run Away with Me" (Carly Rae Jepsen)	Lady Boom Boom
6	Bombae	vs.	Irma Gerd	"Table Dancer" (Keshia Chanté)	Bombae
7	Gisèle Lullaby	vs.	Irma Gerd	"Love Is" (Alannah Myles)	Irma Gerd
8	Kimmy Couture	vs.	Vivian Vanderpuss	"CTRL + ALT + DEL" (Rêve)	Vivian Vanderpuss
Episode	Final contestants			Song	Winner
9	Gisèle Lullaby	vs.	Jada Shada Hudson	"A New Day Has Come (Radio Remix)" (Céline Dion)	Gisèle Lullaby

== Guest judges ==
In June 2022, the judges for the third season were announced. Brooke Lynn Hytes, Brad Goreski, and Traci Melchor remain behind the judging table. The season also includes several guest judges, listed in chronological order:

- Monika Schnarre, model
- Carole Pope, singer
- Vanessa Vanjie Mateo, contestant from RuPaul's Drag Race Season 10 and Season 11
- Hollywood Jade, dancer and choreographer
- Jimbo, contestant from Canada's Drag Race Season 1 and RuPaul's Drag Race: UK vs. the World Series 1
- Sarain Fox, activist
- Mei Pang, makeup artist and beauty vlogger
- Jeremy Dutcher, musicologist
- Lesley Hampton, anishinaabe artist and fashion designer
- Sarah Nurse, hockey player

=== Special guests ===
Episode 9:

- Icesis Couture, winner of Canada's Drag Race Season 2

== Episodes ==
No. overall	No. in season	Title	Original release date
21	1	"Sidewalk to Catwalk"	July 14, 2022
Twelve new queens enter the werkroom. For the first mini-challenge, the queens serve "streetwear chic" looks in a rooftop fashion show. Bombae wins the mini-challenge. For the main challenge, the queens must turn their streetwear mini-challenge looks into high fashion catwalk couture outfits. On the runway, Jada Shada Hudson, Kaos and Lady Boom Boom receive positive critiques, with Lady Boom Boom winning the challenge. Halal Bae, Miss Fiercalicious and Miss Moço receive negative critiques, with Miss Fiercalicious being safe. Halal Bae and Miss Moço lip-sync to "Beauty and a Beat" by Justin Bieber ft. Nicki Minaj. Miss Moço wins the lip-sync, and Halal Bae is the first queen to sashay away.: Guest Judge: Monika Schnarre; Mini-Challenge: Serve a "streetwear chic" look in a rooftop fashion show; Mini-Challenge Winner: Bombae; Mini-Challenge Prize: $2,500 courtesy of the Rupaul's Drag Race Werq the World Tour; Main Challenge: Create an entirely new "catwalk couture" look using their mini-challenge streetwear look; Runway Theme: Sidewalk to Catwalk; Challenge Winner: Lady Boom Boom; Challenge Prize: $5,000 courtesy of Palm Holdings; Bottom Two: Halal Bae and Miss Moço; Lip Sync Song: "Beauty and a Beat" by Justin Bieber ft. Nicki Minaj; Eliminated: Halal Bae; Farewell Message: "I'll meat you girls on the other side. ♡ XOXO, Halal. P.S. Love you Bom! Get that crown"
22	2	"The Who-Knows"	July 21, 2022
For the mini-challenge, the queens are asked to design a quick-drag look made from a hockey jersey and gear, and audition to be on a drag queen hockey team. Chelazon Leroux wins the mini-challenge. For the main challenge, the queens must host segments of the prestigious award show the Who-Knows, and present the awards. On the runway, category is Goddesses of the Ancient World. Chelazon Leroux, Kimmy Couture and Miss Fiercalicious receive positive critiques, with Kimmy Couture winning the challenge. Irma Gerd, Jada Shada Hudson and Miss Moço receive negative critiques, with Irma Gerd being safe. Jada Shada Hudson and Miss Moço lip-sync to "High School Confidential" by Rough Trade. Jada Shada Hudson wins the lip-sync, and Miss Moço sashays away.: Guest Judge: Carole Pope; Mini-Challenge: Design a hockey equipment "quick-drag" look and audition for a drag queen hockey team; Mini-Challenge Winner: Chelazon Leroux; Mini-Challenge Prize: $2,500 courtesy of the drag queen hip pad company Planet Pepper + the power to form the groups for the Main Challenge; Main Challenge: Host and present segments of the Who-Knows awards show; Runway Theme: Goddesses of the Ancient World; Challenge Winner: Kimmy Couture; Challenge Prize: $5,000 and a weekend getaway for two to Prince Edward County, courtesy of Welcome to the Dans; Bottom Two: Jada Shada Hudson and Miss Moço; Lip Sync Song: "High School Confidential" by Rough Trade; Eliminated: Miss Moço; Farewell Message: "Hey queens! Y'all are so incredible + beautiful. Have fun! Be kind! Jada - I love you! XO, Moço"
23	3	"Ruets"	July 28, 2022
For this week's mini-challenge, the queens get into masculine quick drag and try to make Brooke Lynn laugh on a blind date. Vivian Vanderpuss wins the mini-challenge. For the main challenge, the queens choreograph and perform lip-sync numbers to well-known RuPaul duets in pairs. The queens perform the following numbers: Chelazon Leroux and Kaos: "Adrenaline" by RuPaul and Myah Marie; Kimmy Couture and Lady Boom Boom: "I Feel Like Dancing" by RuPaul and La Toya Jackson; Bombae and Miss Fiercalicious: "Let the Music Play" by RuPaul and Michelle Visage; Irma Gerd and Jada Shada Hudson: "Peanut Butter" by RuPaul and Big Freedia; Gisèle Lullaby and Vivian Vanderpuss: "Throw Ya Hands Up" by RuPaul and Lady Bunny; On the runway, category is Sleeves. Irma Gerd, Jada Shada Hudson, Kimmy Couture and Lady Boom Boom receive positive critiques, with Jada Shada Hudson winning the challenge. Bombae, Chelazon Leroux, Kaos and Miss Fiercalicious receive negative critiques, with Bombae and Kaos being safe. Chelazon Leroux and Miss Fiercalicious lip-sync to "Don't Call Me Baby" by Kreesha Turner. Miss Fiercalicious wins the lip-sync and Chelazon Leroux sashays away.: Guest Judges: Vanessa Vanjie Mateo and Hollywood Jade; Mini-Challenge: Create a "quick-drag" masculine character and make Brooke laugh on a blind date; Mini-Challenge Winner: Vivian Vanderpuss; Mini-Challenge Prize: A $2,500 gift card courtesy of ShoeFreaks + the power to assign the songs for the Main Challenge; Main Challenge: In pairs, choreograph and perform lip-sync numbers to well-known RuPaul duets; Runway Theme: Sleeves; Challenge Winner: Jada Shada Hudson; Challenge Prize: A $5,000 gift card courtesy of Fabricland; Bottom Two: Chelazon Leroux and Miss Fiercalicious; Lip Sync Song: "Don't Call Me Baby" by Kreesha Turner; Eliminated: Chelazon Leroux; Farewell Message: "Loved meeting you all. Good luck writing your own jokes. Stay deadly. Chelazon"
24	4	"Bitch Stole My Look"	August 4, 2022
For this week's mini-challenge, the queens improvise a "Tuck Talk" sponsored by Trojan. Jada Shada Hudson wins the mini-challenge. For the main challenge, the queens have to create a runway look from a box of materials, with the twist being that every queen's box has identical contents. On the runway, category is Bitch Stole My Look. Bombae, Gisèle Lullaby and Kimmy Couture receive positive critiques, with Gisèle Lullaby winning the challenge. Irma Gerd, Jada Shada Hudson and Kaos receive negative critiques, with Irma Gerd being safe. Jada Shada Hudson and Kaos lip-sync to "Stranger in My House (Thunderpuss Radio Mix)" by Tamia. Jada Shada Hudson wins the lip-sync and Kaos sashays away.: Guest Judges: Sarain Fox and Jimbo; Mini-Challenge: Improvise a "Tuck Talk" sponsored by Trojan; Mini-Challenge Winner: Jada Shada Hudson; Mini-Challenge Prize: $2,500 worth of pleasure products from Trojan; Main Challenge: Create a distinctive runway look from the same material as the other queens; Runway Theme: Bitch Stole My Look; Challenge Winner: Gisèle Lullaby; Challenge Prize: $5,000 courtesy of Snag Tights; Bottom Two: Jada Shada Hudson and Kaos; Lip Sync Song: "Stranger in My House (Thunderpuss Radio Mix)" by Tamia; Eliminated: Kaos; Farewell Message: "All you girls fucking rock!!! Always keep your confidence going strong! Live your inner Kaos!!! Vivian you bitch get that crown! P.S. Bombae, I'm keeping the wig! See y'all real soon!!! ♡ Kaos"
25	5	"Snatch Game"	August 11, 2022
For this week's mini-challenge, the queens read each other to filth. Lady Boom Boom wins the mini-challenge. For this week's maxi-challenge, the queens impersonate celebrities and play the Snatch Game. Brad Goreski and Traci Melchor star as the celebrity contestants. The cast consists of: Bombae as Aziz Ansari; Gisèle Lullaby as Marie Curie; Irma Gerd as Marilyn Monroe; Jada Shada Hudson as Saucy Santana; Kimmy Couture as Ariana Grande; Lady Boom Boom as Mado Lamotte; Miss Fiercalicious as Kourtney Kardashian; Vivian Vanderpuss as Tammy Faye Messner; On the runway, category is Periodic Table of Elements. Gisèle Lullaby, Irma Gerd and Vivian Vanderpuss receive positive critiques, with Gisèle Lullaby winning the challenge. Bombae, Kimmy Couture and Lady Boom Boom receive negative critiques, with Bombae being safe. Kimmy Couture and Lady Boom Boom lip-sync to "Run Away with Me" by Carly Rae Jepsen. Kimmy Couture wins the lip-sync and Lady Boom Boom sashays away.: Guest Judge: Sarain Fox; Mini-Challenge: Reading is Fundamental; Mini-Challenge Winner: Lady Boom Boom; Mini-Challenge Prize: $2,500 cash courtesy of the Men's Room; Main Challenge: Snatch Game; Runway Theme: Periodic Table of Elements; Challenge Winner: Gisèle Lullaby; Challenge Prize: $5,000 courtesy of Palm Holdings; Bottom Two: Kimmy Couture and Lady Boom Boom; Lip Sync Song: "Run Away with Me" by Carly Rae Jepsen; Eliminated: Lady Boom Boom; Farewell Message: "BOOK ME"
26	6	"Cosmetic Queens"	August 18, 2022
For this week's mini-challenge, the queens create a Drag Family Portrait Session in groups. Jada Shada Hudson wins the mini-challenge. For the main challenge, the queens film a commercial and do a photoshoot to promote their own eyeshadow palette.: Bombae - Butter Chicken; Gisèle Lullaby - Was That French?; Irma Gerd - Snot Rocket; Jada Shada Hudson - Turn Up; Kimmy Couture - Transcending; Miss Fiercalicious - Fierce; Vivian Vanderpuss - Cat Mom; On the runway, category is Paint. Jada Shada Hudson, Miss Fiercalicious and Vivian Vanderpuss receive positive critiques, with Miss Fiercalicious winning the challenge. Bombae, Gisèle Lullaby and Irma Gerd receive negative critiques, with Gisèle Lullaby being safe. Bombae and Irma Gerd lip-sync to "Table Dancer" by Keshia Chanté. Irma Gerd wins the lip-sync and Bombae sashays away.: Guest Judge: Mei Pang; Mini-Challenge: Drag Family Portrait Session; Mini-Challenge Winner: Jada Shada Hudson; Mini-Challenge Prize: $2,500 cash courtesy of Dirt Squirrel Apparel; Main Challenge: Film a commercial and do a photoshoot to promote their own eyeshadow palette; Runway Theme: Paint; Challenge Winner: Miss Fiercalicious; Challenge Prize: $5,000 courtesy of Neutrogena; Bottom Two: Bombae and Irma Gerd; Lip Sync Song: "Table Dancer" by Keshia Chanté; Eliminated: Bombae; Farewell Message: "Will you see me again? WHO KNOWS? Love you ♡ Bom"
27	7	"Squirrels Trip: The Rusical"	August 25, 2022
For this week's mini-challenge, the queens audition for a parody sci-fi film. Kimmy Couture wins the mini-challenge. For the main challenge, the queens will perform in Squirrels Trip: The Rusical.: Gisèle Lullaby plays Jill; Irma Gerd plays Jackae; Jada Shada Hudson plays Grace; Kimmy Couture plays Amber; Miss Fiercalicious plays Ronnie; Vivian Vanderpuss plays Kiki; On the runway, category is Dystopian Drag. Kimmy Couture, Miss Fiercalicious and Vivian Vanderpuss receive positive critiques, with Vivian Vanderpuss winning the challenge. Gisèle Lullaby, Irma Gerd and Jada Shada Hudson receive negative critiques, with Jada Shada Hudson being safe. Gisèle Lullaby and Irma Gerd lip-sync to "Love Is" by Alannah Myles. Gisèle Lullaby wins the lip-sync and Irma Gerd sashays away.: Guest Judge: Jeremy Dutcher; Mini-Challenge: Audition for a parody sci-fi film; Mini-Challenge Winner: Kimmy Couture; Mini-Challenge Prize: $2,500 cash courtesy of Made; Main Challenge: Squirrels Trip: The Rusical; Runway Theme: Dystopian Drag; Challenge Winner: Vivian Vanderpuss; Challenge Prize: $2,500 courtesy of Made; Bottom Two: Gisèle Lullaby and Irma Gerd; Lip Sync Song: "Love Is" by Alannah Myles; Eliminated: Irma Gerd; Farewell Message: "Thank you ever so! Hope you had a GERD time ♡ VIVIAN 👑"
28	8	"Masquerade Ball"	September 1, 2022
For this week's main challenge, the queens have to make three looks for The Masquerade Ball: Masc for Mascara, Incog-She-To and Masquerade Eleganza. On the runway, Gisèle Lullaby and Miss Fiercalicious receive positive critiques, with Miss Fiercalicious winning the challenge. Kimmy Couture and Vivian Vanderpuss receive negative critiques and are up for elimination. They lip-sync to "CTRL + ALT + DELETE" by Rêve. Kimmy Couture wins the lip-sync and Vivian Vanderpuss sashays away.: Guest Judge: Lesley Hampton; Main Challenge: The Masquerade Ball; Runway Themes: Masc for Mascara, Incog-She-To and Masquerade Eleganza; Challenge Winner: Miss Fiercalicious; Challenge Prize: $5,000 courtesy of Snag Tights; Bottom Two: Kimmy Couture and Vivian Vanderpuss; Lip Sync Song: "CTRL + ALT + DEL" by Rêve; Eliminated: Vivian Vanderpuss; Farewell Message: "I miss you already. I think it's really important that you remember the size of my lips! Jizelle 👑👑👑"
29	9	"True North Strong (and Fierce)"	September 8, 2022
For the final challenge of the season, the queens will have to write and record their own verse for and perform to "True North Strong and Fierce". They will also have to do a photoshoot with Season 2's winner Icesis Couture. The queens walk the runway one last time in their Coronation Eleganza. The eliminated queens return and walk the runway one last time as well. After the runway, it is announced that Kimmy Couture and Miss Fiercalicious are eliminated, leaving Giséle Lullaby and Jada Shada Hudson as the final two. They lip-sync to "A New Day Has Come (Radio Remix)" by Céline Dion. It is announced that Giséle Lullaby is the winner, leaving Jada Shada Hudson as the runner-up.: Guest Judge: Sarah Nurse; Main Challenge: Write and record your own verse for and perform to "True North Strong and Fierce" as well as a photoshoot with Icesis Couture; Runway Theme: Coronation Eleganza; Miss Congeniality: Vivian Vanderpuss; Eliminated: Kimmy Couture and Miss Fiercalicious; Top Two: Gisèle Lullaby and Jada Shada Hudson; Lip Sync Song: "A New Day Has Come (Radio Remix)" by Céline Dion; Runner-up: Jada Shada Hudson; Winner of Canada's Drag Race Season Three: Gisèle Lullaby

== Awards ==
Award	Date of ceremony	Category	Nominees	Result	Ref.
Canadian Screen Awards	April 16, 2023	Best Reality/Competition Program or Series	Trevor Boris, Michelle Mama, Yette Vandendam, Betty Orr, Laura Michalchyshyn, Michael Kot, Justin Stockman, Fenton Bailey, Randy Barbato, Tom Campbell, RuPaul Charles, Spencer Fritz	Nominated	
Canadian Screen Awards	April 16, 2023	Best Direction, Reality/Competition	Shelagh O'Brien — "Girls Trip: The Rusical"	Won	
Canadian Screen Awards	April 16, 2023	Best Writing, Lifestyle or Reality/Competition	Brandon Ash-Mohammed, Trevor Boris, Spencer Fritz, Kevin Hazlehurst — "Girls Trip: The Rusical"	Won	
Canadian Screen Awards	April 16, 2023	Best Picture Editing, Reality/Competition	Lindsay Ragone — "Masquerade Ball"	Nominated	
Canadian Screen Awards	April 16, 2023	Best Picture Editing, Reality/Competition	Peter Topalovic — "Sidewalk to Catwalk"	Nominated	
Canadian Screen Awards	April 16, 2023	Best Sound, Lifestyle, Reality or Entertainment	John Diemer, Scott Brachmayer, Rosie Eberhard, Levi Linton, Rob Taylor, Alastair Sims, Eric Leigh — "Girls Trip: The Rusical"	Won	
Canadian Screen Awards	April 16, 2023	Best Production Design or Art Direction, Non-Fiction	Andrew Kinsella — "Sidewalk to Catwalk"	Won	
Canadian Screen Awards	April 16, 2023	Best Casting, Non-Fiction	Heather Muir	Won	
Canadian Screen Awards	April 16, 2023	Best Host or Presenter, Factual or Reality/Competition	Brooke Lynn Hytes, Traci Melchor, Brad Goreski	Won	
