= Karamilk =

Canadian entertainer

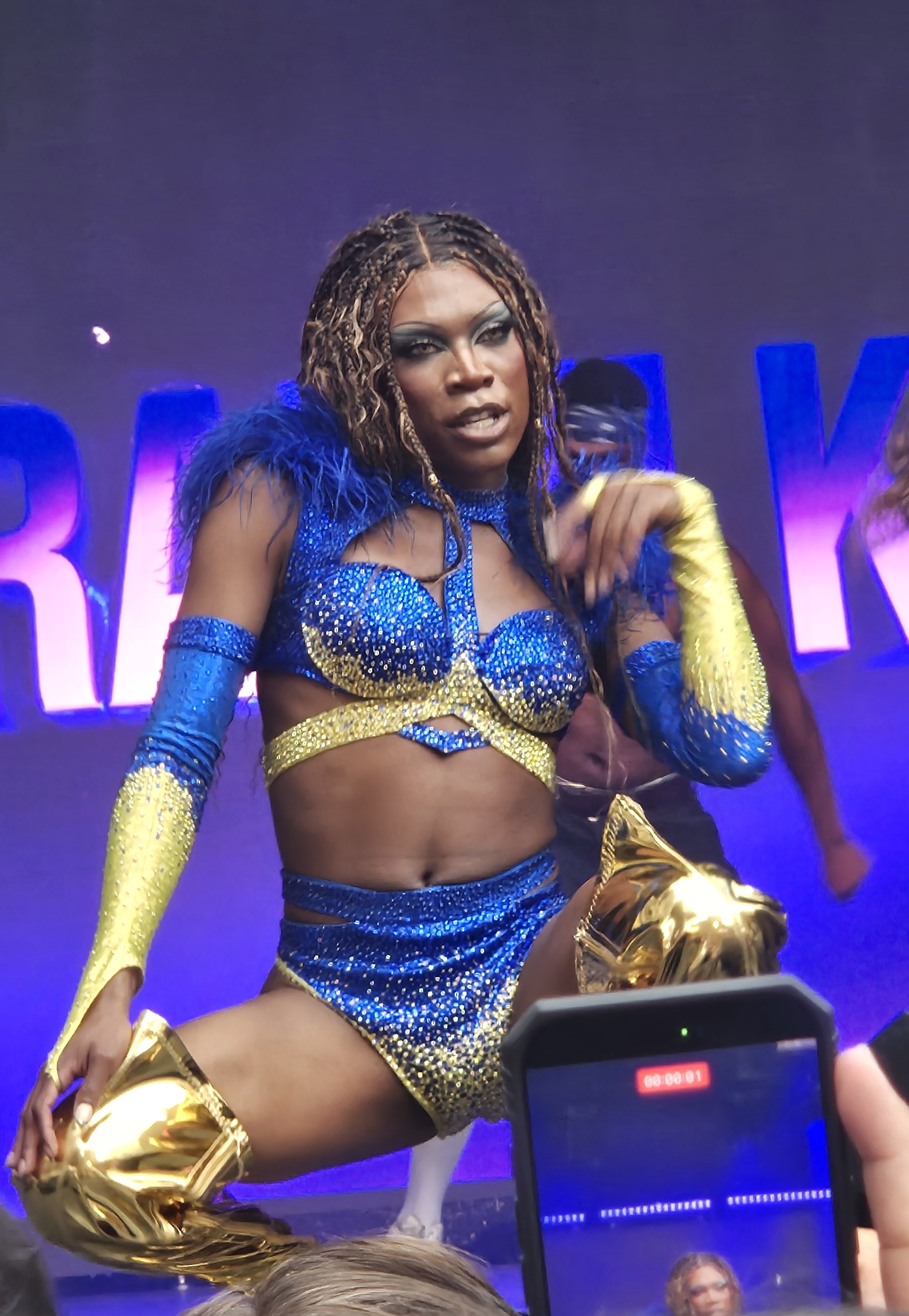
- Karamilk performing at Capital Pride 2026 in Ottawa
- Born: February 5, 2000 (age 26); Halifax, Nova Scotia, Canada
- Other name: Jaden Slawter
- Education: Carleton University
- Occupations: Drag queen, dancer, event organizer

Jaden Slawter (born February 5, 2000), known by the stage name Karamilk, is a Canadian drag queen, dancer, and event organizer. She rose to prominence as a competitor on the sixth season of Canada's Drag Race.

== Early life and education ==
Karamilk was born on February 5, 2000, and was raised in the Lower Sackville neighbourhood of Halifax, Nova Scotia by pastor parents. Growing up she was unable to display her queerness, with "being queer and being gay, or, like, even going out" not something she was allowed to do. Karamilk did competitive dance throughout her childhood.

Karamilk moved to Ottawa, Ontario to attend the communication and media studies program at Carleton University, graduating in 2022. While at Carleton she was president of the Rideau River Residents Association.

== Career ==
Karamilk started her work in event organizing while a student at Carleton University, helping to organize the university's first on campus drag show. In 2020 she had a summer internship working for Capital Pride, the pride organization in Ottawa, assisting with planning the 2020 Pride festival. She also worked for Carleton University's Student Experience Office in 2022 and assisted in organizing their first pride festival in 2023. She later worked for Pride Toronto.

She began backup dancing for other drag acts in Ottawa in 2020 before getting in drag the first time in 2022. She won the first season of Ottawa's Next Drag Superstar at The Lookout Bar later that year, only a few months after starting drag. She also won Absolut Empire's Ball Season 4.

In early 2025 she was featured in the Crave makeover television series Drag Brunch Saved My Life.

In October 2025 she was announced as one of twelve competitors on the sixth season of Canada's Drag Race. She landed in the bottom in the third episode following her performance as Flavor Flav on the Snatch Game, performing in front of her drag grandmother Icesis Couture who was the guest judge that week. She beat Star Doll in a lip sync to "Tonight I'm Getting Over You" by Carly Rae Jepsen. She was again in the bottom in episode five, beating Dulce in a lip sync to "Dancing and Crying" by guest judge Kiesza. In the season's lip sync slay off she won the first round against Velma Jones before losing a lip sync to Eboni La'Belle. She was eliminated before the grand finale after losing a lip sync to Sami Landri to Vita Chambers' "Fix You", placing fifth overall.

== Personal life ==
She is of Barbadian and Jamaican descent. After living in Ottawa during and following her education at Carleton University she is now based in Toronto as of 2025.

Her drag mother is Kimmy Couture, making her part of the House of Couture, whose other members include Icesis Couture and Makayla Couture. Her drag character is inspired by Rihanna, SZA, and Normani.

== Filmography ==
Television
Year	Title	Role	Notes
2025	Drag Brunch Saved My Life	Herself	Guest
2025–2026	Canada's Drag Race	Herself	Contestant; 5th place (Season 6)

Web series
Year	Title	Role	Notes
2025	The Powderpuff Girls	Herself	1 episode
2025	THYRSTY BOYS	Herself	1 episode
2026	The Extra Mile	Herself	1 episode
2026	The CUP	Herself	1 episode
2026	Sap It Up	Herself	1 episode
2026	Facing Reality	Herself	1 episode
