= Tracy Trash =

Canadian drag queen

Tracy Trash is the stage name of Marc-André Leclair, a Canadian drag queen and actor most noted for his supporting performance in the 2023 film One Summer (Le temps d'un été).

Leclair is originally from the Montreal borough of Pierrefonds-Roxboro. After studying theatre at Collège Lionel-Groulx, he began performing as a drag queen at Cabaret Mado in the early 2000s, later telling the press that he got into the scene so that he wouldn't have to support himself between acting jobs by selling sandwiches and coffee.

In 2014 he played Ms. Gracie in a stage production of Puelo Deir's Saint Jude du Village.

In 2017, Leclair participated in Ils de jour, elles de nuit, an Ici ARTV documentary series about drag queens, alongside Barbada de Barbades, Gaby, Lady Boom Boom, Lady Pounana and Rita Baga.

In 2021 he played the starring role in a production of Michel Tremblay's play Hosanna.

In 2023 he appeared in One Summer as Angel, and in a small supporting role in Solo. He received a Canadian Screen Award nomination for Best Supporting Performance in a Comedy Film at the 12th Canadian Screen Awards in 2024, for One Summer.

In 2025, he portrayed Miss Dalloway, a caricatured supernatural expert, in the film My Stepmother Is a Witch (Ma belle-mère est une sorcière).
