= Kaos (drag queen) =

Canadian Drag Performer

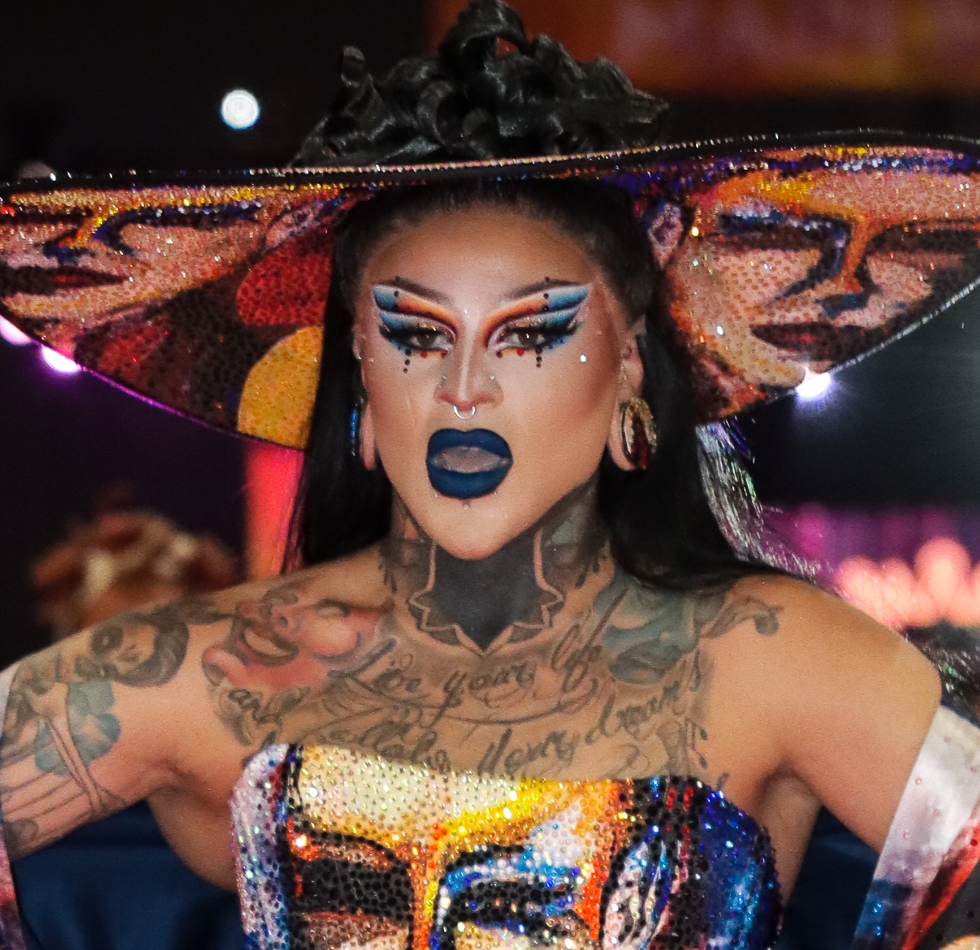
- Kaos at RuPaul's DragCon LA, 2024
- Born: Jesilo Bernard
- Occupation: Drag Queen
- Television: Canada's Drag Race (season 3)

Kaos is the stage name of Jesilo Bernard, a Canadian drag performer who competed on season 3 of Canada's Drag Race.

== Career ==
Kaos competed on season 3 of Canada's Drag Race. She was eliminated from the competition after placing in the bottom two of the season's second design challenge, and losing a lip sync against Jada Shada Hudson to the Thunderpuss remix of Tamia's "Stranger in My House" (2001).

A writer for Screen Rant wrote, "Kaos fully embraces their name when it comes to their drag. They believe that more is more, and many of their looks are elaborate and have numerous elements to take in." Bernardo Sim included Kaos in Pride.com's 2023 list of the 20 best "trades" from the Drag Race franchise.

== Personal life ==
Kaos is from Calgary. Kaos uses the pronouns she/her/they/them in drag, and he/him/they out of drag.

On July 23, 2024, Kaos and fellow Drag Race alumni Morphine Love Dion were involved in a car accident after their Uber crashed into the center divider wall on the Interstate 10 freeway in Jefferson Park, Los Angeles and a second vehicle collided with the car. Kaos and Dion were among the 10 injured from the crash, and one person was killed.

== Filmography ==
=== Television ===
- Canada's Drag Race (season 3)
- Bring Back My Girls (2023)

== See also ==
- Indigenous drag performers
