= Queens (web series) =

2020 Canadian web series

Queens is a Canadian comedy-mystery web series, which premiered June 19, 2020 on CBC Gem. The series centres on a group of drag queens in Toronto, Ontario who are planning to compete in the Miss Church Street pageant, who each have their preparations mysteriously sabotaged.

The series stars Champagna as Elaina, Ivory Towers as Shoshanna, Quick Lewinsky as Mooney, Allysin Chaynes as Naomi, Lucy Flawless as Sharron, Lucinda Miu as Minnie, Baby Bel Bel as Babs, Kyah Green as Lou and Jada Shada Hudson as Paper.

The series was created by Justin Gray, himself a drag performer under the name Fisher Price, and directed by Pat Mills. The series was produced by Caitlin Brown, Eddie Majnemer, Michael Bawcutt and Natalie Cooper for Harlow Creative.

Following the premiere on June 19, the cast took part in a videoconferenced panel discussion as part of Pride Toronto's online Pride festivities.

The series was named Best Canadian Web Series in Now's annual year-end reader poll.
