= Mado Lamotte =

Canadian drag queen

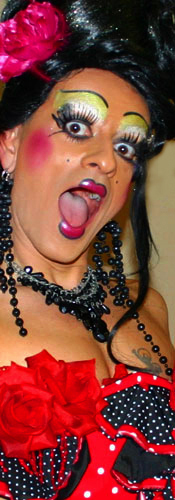
- Mado Lamotte at Cabaret Mado in 2007
- Born: Luc Provost; Montreal, Quebec, Canada
- Occupations: Drag queen, restaurateur
- Years active: 1987 – present

Mado Lamotte is the stage name of Luc Provost, a Canadian drag queen, author, singer and gay community personality, most noted as the owner of the Cabaret Mado drag club in Montreal, Quebec.

== Career ==
Provost, who studied theatre at the Université du Québec à Montréal, began his drag performance career in 1987. As Mado Lamotte she was MC and DJ of Ciel Mon Mardi at Sky in the 1990s, before opening her own drag cabaret, Cabaret Mado, in Montreal's Gay Village in 2002. She was also for many years the organizer and host of Mascara, the annual drag stage show at Divers/Cité.

Lamotte is also an author, who has written a weekly column for the defunct Ici weekly newspaper and a monthly article for the Fugues gay and lesbian newsmagazine. In 2000, she published a collection of her columns entitled Tu vois ben qu'est folle ("She's obviously crazy").

She released a single, "Le Rap à Minifée", in 1996, and a full-length album, Full Mado - Le Remix Album, in 2010. She has made cameo appearances in the films Saved by the Belles and Cadavre Exquis premiere edition, and starred in the 2007 play Saving Céline, in which she (credited as Mado Lamotte, not Luc Provost) portrayed a drag queen obsessed by Céline Dion who becomes embroiled in a murder plot against the singer.

On August 12, 2017, as a part of Fierté Montréal Canada, Mado celebrated her 30th anniversary as a performer with a free show at the Parc des faubourgs in Montréal. In the same year she was the host of Ils de jour, elles de nuit, an Ici ARTV television documentary series about drag queens which profiled Rita Baga, Barbada de Barbades, Gaby, Lady Boom Boom, Lady Pounana and Tracy Trash.

In 2018, Provost opened La Dinette chez Mado, a diner-style restaurant adjacent to Cabaret Mado.

In 2023 Provost published the memoir Une Madographie, and played the title character in Hosanna, Michel Tremblay's 1973 play about a drag queen, in a stage production directed by Maxime Robin for Théàtre Le Trident.

In 2024 she announced a stand-up comedy tour, consisting of 20 shows between December 2024 and June 2025.

== In popular culture ==
In August 2022, Lady Boom Boom selected Mado as her Snatch Game character impersonation in the third season of Canada's Drag Race. She ended up in the bottom two, and was eliminated after a lip sync against fellow contestant Kimmy Couture. Fellow contestant and Montreal-based drag colleague Gisèle Lullaby had also intended to play Mado, but later ceded the character to Boom Boom on the grounds that she had a backup character, Marie Curie, while Boom Boom did not; Gisèle Lullaby, notably, won the challenge.

== Discography ==
- 1996: Le Rap à Minifée (CD single)
- 2010: Full Mado: Le Remix Album

== Filmography ==
- 2003: Saved by the Belles
- 2006: Cadavre Exquis premiere edition
- 2007: La Reine Mado

== Awards ==
- Officer, Order of Montreal, 2024
