= Hosanna (play) =

Play written by Michel Tremblay

Hosanna is a 1973 play by French-Canadian writer Michel Tremblay. The story takes place in the Montreal, Quebec, apartment of Hosanna, a drag queen dressed as Elizabeth Taylor's Cleopatra, and centres on the relationship between her and Cuirette, an aging "stud" and gay biker, after they have returned from a Halloween party. It became the first Canadian play about and starring a drag queen when it was performed at Théâtre de Quat'Sous in Montreal in 1973.

The play deals with several issues including gender identity, sexual identity, the ignorance and acceptance of ageing, and social expressions of homosexuality. Hosanna discusses her relationship with her mother and shows her anxieties over her knowledge of who she really is. The scholar and activist Viviane Namaste has criticized Hosanna, which ends with its protagonist identifying as a gay man after a series of humiliations, as reinforcing a patriarchal, transphobic ideology in which a "reliance on the ideas of illusion, deception, and betrayal presupposes that we as transgendered people do not know who we are. [...] It is through such a violently anti-transgendered discourse that Tremblay enables gay male subject-positions."

The play was translated into English by John Van Burek and Bill Glassco.

== Sequels ==
Hosanna recurred as a character in the 1974 film Once Upon a Time in the East (Il était une fois dans l'est), in a different storyline not directly drawn from the original play.

Tremblay later revisited the story of Hosanna in his 2022 novel La Shéhérazade des pauvres, which centred on the now-elderly Hosanna recalling her life in an interview with a journalist long after her retirement.

== Productions ==
Hosanna was first performed at le Théâtre de Quat'sous in Montreal, Quebec, on 10 May 1973. Hosanna was first performed in English at Tarragon Theatre in Toronto, Ontario, on 15 May 1974. Hosanna then appeared on Broadway in New York City at the Bijou Theatre on 14 October 1974.

A Tron Theatre production of a translation of the play into contemporary Scots by Bill Findlay and Martin Bowman was staged as part of Glasgow Mayfest in 1991.

A 2021 production staged at Cabaret Mado in Montreal starred Tracy Trash as Hosanna. In 2023, a production directed by Maxime Robin for Théàtre Le Trident blended Hosanna with La Shéhérazade des pauvres, with Vincent Roy playing the young Hosanna and Mado Lamotte playing the elderly Hosanna.
