= Kimmy Couture =

Filipino-Canadian drag performer

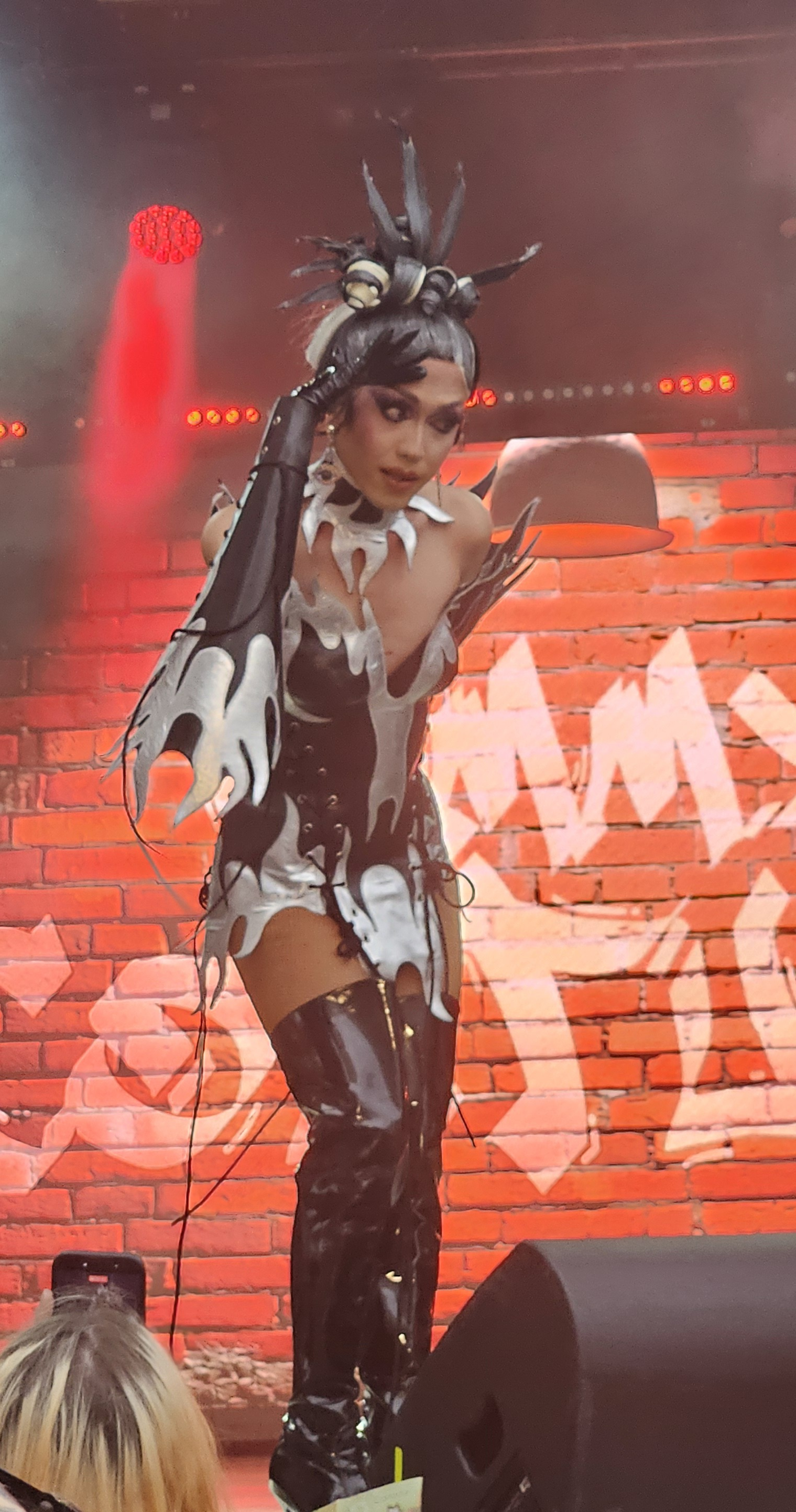
- Kimmy Couture performing at Capital Pride 2026 in Ottawa
- Born: September 30, 1996 (age 30); Southern Leyte, Philippines
- Other name: Kimmy Dymond
- Occupation: Drag queen

Kimmy Couture (born September 30, 1996) is a Filipino-Canadian drag queen known for being the first transgender contestant on Canada's Drag Race when she competed on season 3 of the series.

== Career ==
Kimmy Couture was first introduced to drag by friends in 2011 who got her a gig, following which club managers "loved all her performances" and continued to book her. During this time, she also performed under the name Kimmy Dymond. In 2018, she was crowned Ms Capital Pride, becoming the first transgender woman to win the title. She also appeared on CTV News in 2019, as well as being part of the first Winter Pride in February 2019 as part of Winterlude.

In 2021, Kimmy Couture was prominently featured in the documentary (613) Queens by Rowan O'Brien, along with drag daughter Jasmine Dymond, which showcased the local Ottawa drag scene.

In 2022, Kimmmy Couture was announced as one of the twelve queens competing on the third season of Canada's Drag Race. In episode 2, she won the maxi challenge for her performance in the Who-Knows Awards, a parody of the Juno Awards. She impersonated American singer-songwriter Ariana Grande for the Snatch Game challenge, a performance which landed her in the bottom. She won the lip sync against Lady Boom Boom to "Run Away with Me" by Carly Rae Jepsen. Kimmy Couture ranked in the bottom again in episode 8, beating Vivian Vanderpuss in a lip sync to Rêve's "CTRL + ALT + DEL". Kimmy Couture made it to the finale but was eliminated by the judges before the final lip sync, placing in joint 3rd with Miss Fiercalicious.

Kimmy Couture was chosen as the headliner for the 2022 Capital Pride, and appeared in Winter Pride 2023 co-headlining the drag show with Jada Shada Hudson, Miss Fiercalicious, and local Ottawa drag performers. Kimmy Couture also attended the 2023 edition of RuPaul's DragCon UK.

In June 2023, she received a Plaque of Awards from the Southern Leyte Pride Federation and the Province of Southern Leyte as part of the province's 63rd anniversary. The award was in recognition of "Outstanding Contributions and Achievements in the Field of Arts and Entertainment" and for "exemplary leadership, dedication, and excellence in advocating and empowering the LGBT community".

== Personal life ==
Kim Couture was born in Southern Leyte, Philippines, and immigrated to Canada around 2011. She is a transgender woman and uses both she/her and they/them pronouns in and out of drag. She currently lives in Ottawa, Ontario. Her "drag mother" is Icesis Couture, winner of season 2 of Canada's Drag Race. Her drag daughter Karamilk competed on season 6 of Canada's Drag Race.

Following her time on Drag Race, Kimmy Couture discussed how masculinity-centered challenges during the season triggered feelings of gender dysphoria. She also discussed how members of marginalized communities, such as being trans and a person of colour, can come with the expectation to educate people outside of those communities on issues, stating that it felt like her life was just about "answering the same questions" over and over again.

== Filmography ==
=== Film ===
Year	Title	Role	Notes
2021	(613) Queens	Herself	Documentary short

=== Television ===
Year	Title	Role	Notes
2019	CTV News	Herself	
2022	Canada's Drag Race	Herself	Contestant; 3rd place
2022	Your Morning	Herself	

=== Web series ===
Year	Title	Role	Publisher	Ref.
2019	The Ottawa Drag Scene: Kimmy Dymond	Herself	Ashley Stefureak	
2022	Meet the Queen's of Canada's Drag Race Season 3	Herself	Crave	
2022	iHeartRadio	Herself	iHeartRadio	
2022	Canada's Drag Race Season 3: After the Sashay	Herself	Xtra Magazine	

=== Podcasts ===
Year	Title	Role	Notes	Ref.
2022	The Chop Bloque	Herself	Guest; 2 episodes	

== Discography ==
=== Singles ===
Title	Year	Album
"Squirrels Trip: The Rusical" (The Cast of Canada's Drag Race, Season 3)	2022	Non-album singles
"True North Strong and Fierce" (The Cast of Canada's Drag Race, Season 3)	2022	Non-album singles
