= Lesley Hampton =

First Nations fashion designer in Ontario

- Born: St. John's, Newfoundland and Labrador
- Citizenship: Temagami First Nation and Canada
- Education: George Brown College; University of Toronto (HBA)
- Known for: fashion design

Lesley Hampton is a First Nations Canadian fashion designer from Toronto.

== Early life ==
Hampton was born in St. John's, Newfoundland and Labrador, but also lived in Calgary, Yellowknife, Australia, and Indonesia during her youth. She is part of the Temagami First Nation and has Anishinaabe, Mohawk and Scottish ancestry.

She studied fashion at George Brown College before attending the Mississauga campus of the University of Toronto, where she studied art, earning an honours Bachelor of Arts (HBA) in 2015. Hampton began her fashion career in 2016, when she was 22 years old and still in school.

== Career ==
Her first collection was created in her first semester of college, and was shown at Vancouver Fashion Week, followed by Vogue Runway. The next year, her fall/winter showcase featured Adrianne Haslet, who lost her leg in the Boston Marathon bombing, as well as five plus-sized women and one woman with albinism. In 2019, Hampton became the first designer in over a decade to feature a cast of all Indigenous models during Toronto Fashion Week. Hampton also designed a dress that was worn by Mrs. Universe winner Ashley Callingbull-Burnham in 2019 to raise awareness of Missing and murdered Indigenous women. It was both praised and critiqued in the media, and she later archived images of the dress off of her website.

In June 2022, one of Hampton's collections was featured at the Indigenous Fashion Arts Festival in Toronto. She has also taken part in London Fashion Week and the Santa Fe Indian Market. Her designs have been worn by Elaine Lui, Devery Jacobs and Lizzo.

Hampton started her own scholarship, a $10,0000 award for an Indigenous student with a passion for arts and culture and ties to Ontario land.

She appeared as a guest judge in an episode of the third season of Canada's Drag Race, which aired in summer 2022.

== Awards and Accolades ==
Hampton was nominated for an Ontario Premier's Award in 2018, and was the recipient of the George Brown College Alumni Entrepreneur of the Year Award that same year. In 2019, Hampton was included in Toronto Life magazine's 50 Most Influential Torontonians. Hampton was the First Nation youth winner of the 2021 Indspire Awards. She is also the recipient of the Fashion Impact Award from the Canadian Arts and Fashion Awards. She was the recipient of the inaugural Hazel McCallion Alumni Award of Excellence from the University of Toronto Mississauga in 2024.
