= Chelazon Leroux =

Canadian drag performer

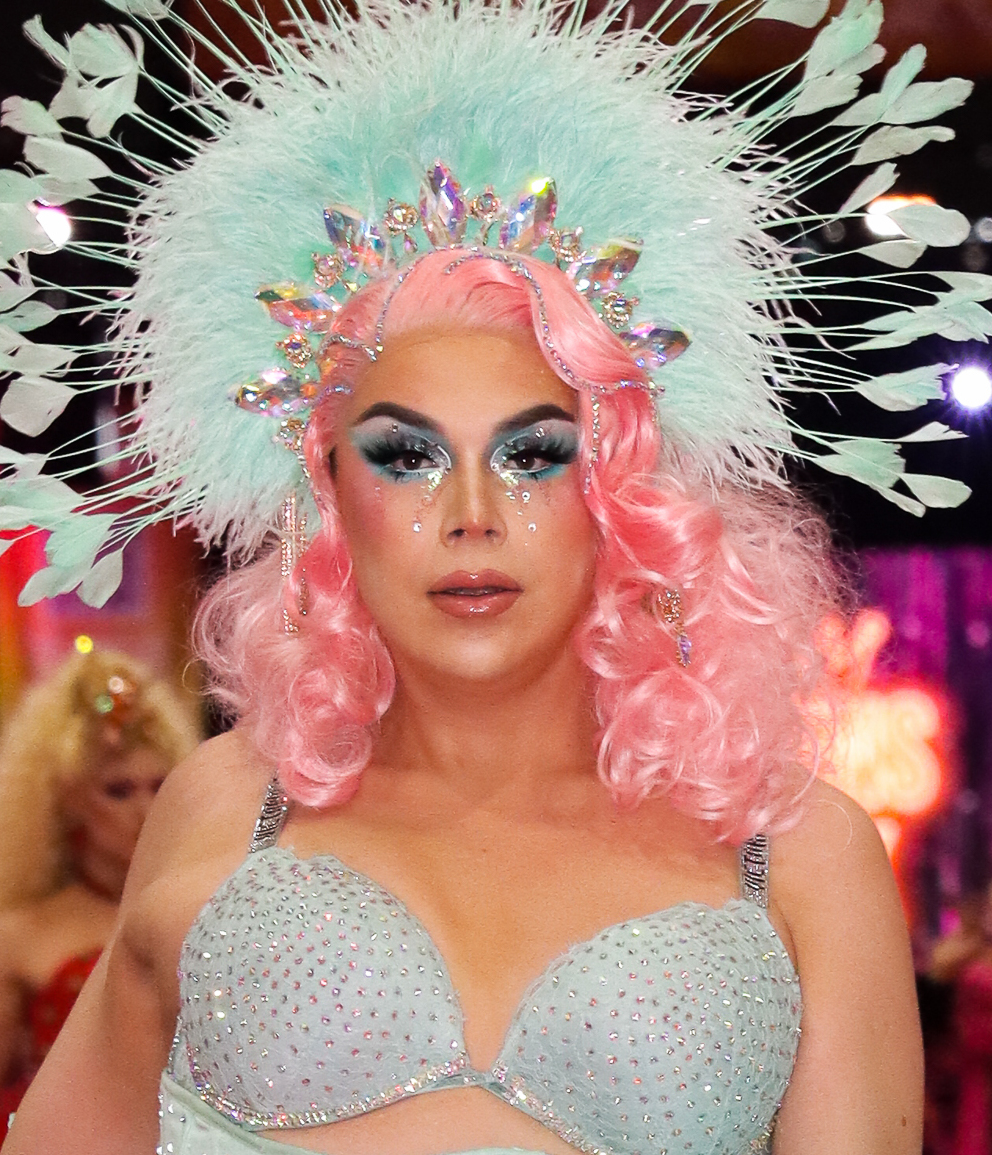
- Leroux at RuPaul's DragCon LA, 2024
- Born: Layten Byhette; November 7, 1999 (age 26)
- Occupation: Drag queen
- Television: Canada's Drag Race (season 3)

Chelazon Leroux (born November 7, 1999) is the stage name of Layten Byhette, a Canadian Dene drag performer, comedian, model, and activist who competed on season 3 of Canada's Drag Race.

== Early life ==
Chelazon Leroux was raised in northern Saskatchewan. Leroux recalls feeling like she did not fit in on the reservation or in her small town in Canada. Growing up, she did not have a positive image of Indigenous representation in the media. At the age of 18, Chelazon Leroux decided to move to the larger city of Edmonton, Canada.

== Career ==
Chelazon Leroux competed on season 3 of Canada's Drag Race.

Chelazon Leroux’s first experience with drag was in their home community at the age of 13 during a talent show for a mental health awareness week. One of the events that was put on was called “Mr. Beautiful and Mrs.Handsome” which Chelazon Leroux describes as drag without being called drag as men wore dresses and women wore work clothes, all while being a comedy.

Their aesthetic for their drag is unapologetically indigenous as they attempt to incorporate their identity. They implement beaded earrings or full-on regalia to express their heritage and showcase indigenousness.

Chelazon Leroux works with Lavender Promotions as their drag management team.

They finished their time on Canada’s Drag Race in 10th place ー eliminated on episode 3. During their time on the show they won one mini challenge: the Frostiest Queen challenge.

They walked in London Fashion Week in 2021 for indigenous designer Jill Setah representing missing and murdered indigenous women.

Chelazon Leroux is in a network of Native American, two-spirit comedians called IndigE-girl Comedy. In November 2023, she was a part of a sold out tour: The Airing of Grievances.

Chelazon Leroux started using TikTok to educate and advocate for Indigenous peoples, and has more than 541,000 followers on the platform. The app allowed her a space to use comedy as a way of sharing stories of her Indigenous upbringing. She has also hosted a series of beauty tutorials called Deadly Like Auntie. The videos share tips, such as how to make a proper hair bun.

== Activism ==
Chelazon Leroux uses their social media platforms to advocate for Native Americans and individuals who identify as two-spirit and LGBTQ+. They use their TikTok platform to share stories of their upbringing and be exactly who they are, allowing them to celebrate their culture. The goal behind their social media content is to educate and give particular views as they say it is in their bloodline to tell stories, allowing them to share their own story without anyone else narrating it for them.

== Personal life ==
Chelazon Leroux is Two-spirit and uses the pronouns he/she/they in and out of drag. She considers Buffalo River Dene Nation home.

The term Two Spirit is used in Native American cultures to define those who identify as having both masculine and feminine spirits. For Native Americans who identify as Two Spirit, the term can be a gender, sexual, or spiritual identity. Chelazon Leroux identifies as a Two Spirit individual who defines it as being a ‘bridge between two worlds’.

Her “auntie” persona largely influences Chelazon Leroux’s influencing. They refer to themselves as Auntie in TikTok videos and interviews every day. They say they use the term as their “love letter to indigenous women'' since, in Native culture, aunties are the matriarchs who carry forward tradition. In an interview, they highlighted that the term represents the ones who raised them and showed them it was okay to be who they are. Moreover, it also illustrates the women who gave them unconditional love and permission to be who they are. Chelazon Leroux also mentions that aunties are the ones who provide them with a sense of humor and creativity in their daily lives and professions.

Native culture uses the term as a term of endearment for indigenous elders, who could include literal aunts, close family friends, or a respected figure within the community. It is used to show appreciation for a person's experience or wisdom.

== Filmography ==
=== Television ===
- Canada's Drag Race (season 3)
- Bring Back My Girls (2023)

== See also ==
- Indigenous drag performers
