= Fugues (magazine) =

Canadian lifestyle magazine

- Editor: Yves Lafontaine
- Categories: lifestyle
- Frequency: Monthly
- Circulation: 42,000 (2013, certified by CCAB)
- Publisher: Éditions Nitram
- First issue: April 1984
- Country: Canada
- Based in: Montreal
- Language: French English
- Website: www.fugues.com
- ISSN: 0831-1625

Fugues is a magazine with a focus on gay content, which publishes monthly in Montreal, Quebec, Canada, since April 1984. The magazine is primarily written in French, although some English content is also published as well. It focuses on news related to LGBT communities, gay culture, nightlife, health, fitness, fashion, travel, festivals, arts and entertainment. Each issue contains articles on news, trends, culture, nightlife, community activities, special folders, and opinion articles.

== Content ==
The magazine aims to highlight both popular and under-the-radar events, personalities and products that appeal to LGBT people both local and abroad visiting Montreal (and Quebec Province), through a variety of portals that include a print publication, an interactive website, a digital newsletter, and an extensive social media presence. Fugues' informed commentary on a variety of topics—including nightlife, dining, entertainment, politics, community issues, fashion, travel, sports, and celebrity— informs a community and engages an influential and loyal readership.

Fugues writes in order to support and promote the LGBT community. It features a listing of locations in the current Quebec gay scene as well as softcore erotic advertisements and a large directory section, including community group information, business contacts, real estate, ads for health and body care, massage and escort services, counseling services and phone lines. It also features a horoscope column with a love twist, several columns, several features and special sections each month.

== Distribution ==
Fugues is published as an alternative format (7 in × 10 1/4 in, 18 cm × 26 cm) glossy magazine and is distributed as a free publication not only in Montreal's Gay Village, but also all over town and in selected cities across Canada such as Quebec City, Ottawa, Toronto, Vancouver and over 20 smaller cities all over the Province of Quebec. It is the only LGBT magazine title in Quebec with a regular print circulation.

== Other publications by the same publisher ==
Cover of Guide Arc-en-ciel for Fall 2000 / Winter 2001

Fugues publishers publish a number of other publications including:

- Guide Arc-en-ciel
- Quebec Rainbow Guide (English version of Guide Arc-en-ciel)
- DecorHomme
- Zip (erotic magazine)
