= Miss Moço =

Drag performer and photographer

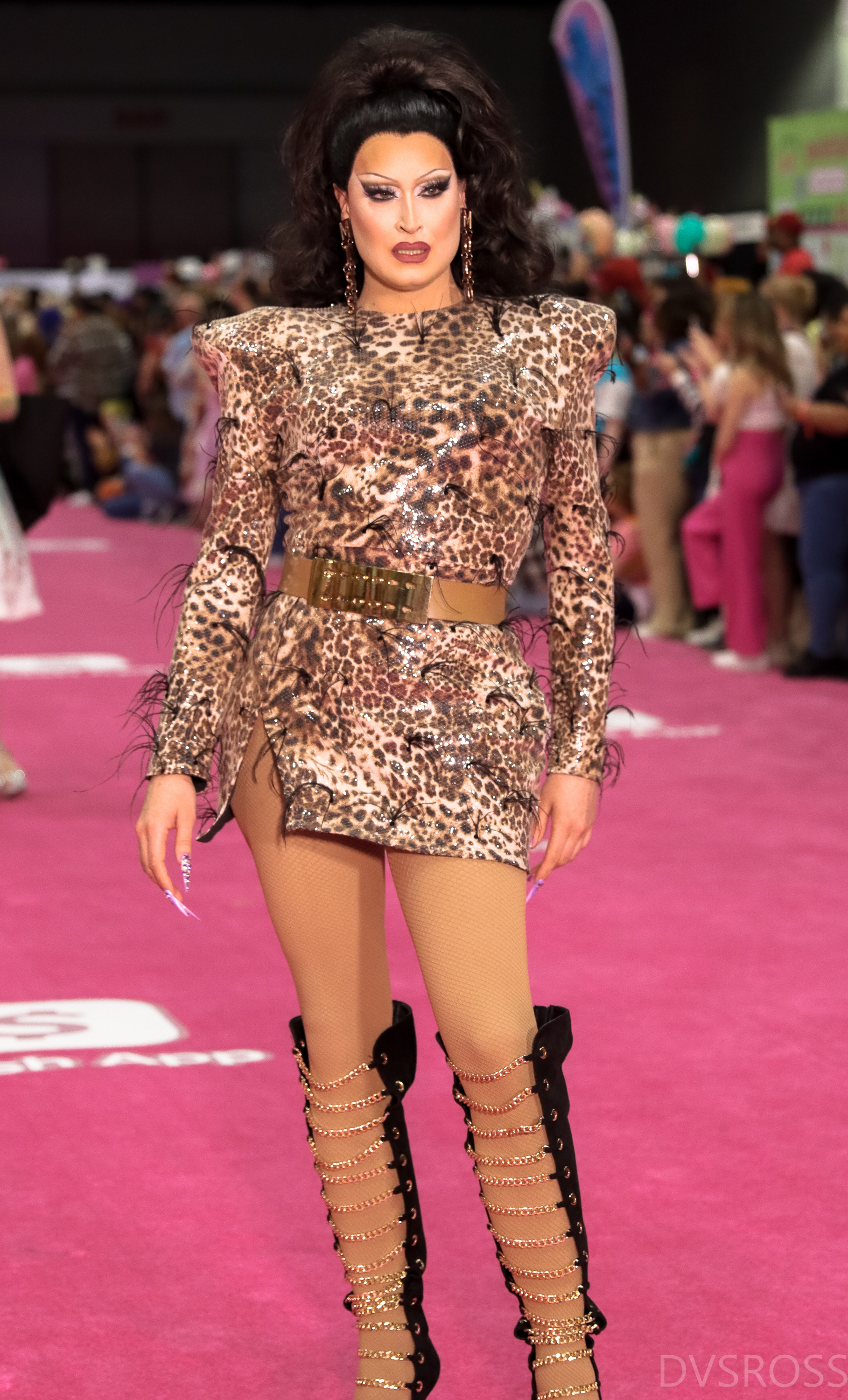
- Miss Moço at RuPaul's DragCon LA, 2023
- Born: Adam Moco; Cambridge, Ontario, Canada
- Education: George Brown College; Humber College
- Occupations: Drag queen; photographer
- Television: Canada's Drag Race (season 3)
- Website: missmoco.ca

Miss Moço is the stage name of Adam Moco, a Portuguese-Canadian drag performer and photographer who competed on season 3 of Canada's Drag Race.

== Early life and education ==
Adam Moco was born in Cambridge, and raised in Galt, Ontario. He attended George Brown College and Humber College to study fashion business and photography, respectively.

== Career ==
Miss Moço is a drag performer and photographer who moved to Toronto early in her career. She is the resident host of Drag Brunch at the Drake Hotel in Toronto every Saturday. She has also hosted interactive "quote-along" screenings of popular youth cult films at the TIFF Next Wave film festival, including Josie and the Pussycats in 2025 and High School Musical 3: Senior Year in 2026.

She also founded a drag pageant in Portugal (Miss Drag Lisboa) in 2017. In 2022, she competed on season 3 of Canada's Drag Race. She was the second contestant eliminated from the competition.

Outside of drag, Moco has also continued to work as a photographer, with some of his photographic work having been exhibited at Toronto's annual 10x10 art show.

== Personal life ==
Moco is based in Toronto. He was married to Anton Levin, who sometimes performed at Moço's drag brunch under the drag name Anita Moment. After their breakup, he entered a new relationship with Andrew Spice, a psychologist and musician, with the couple holding their wedding at the Drake Hotel in 2024.

== Filmography ==
=== Television ===
- Canada's Drag Race (season 3)
- Bring Back My Girls (2023)
