= Bombae =

Indian-Canadian drag performer

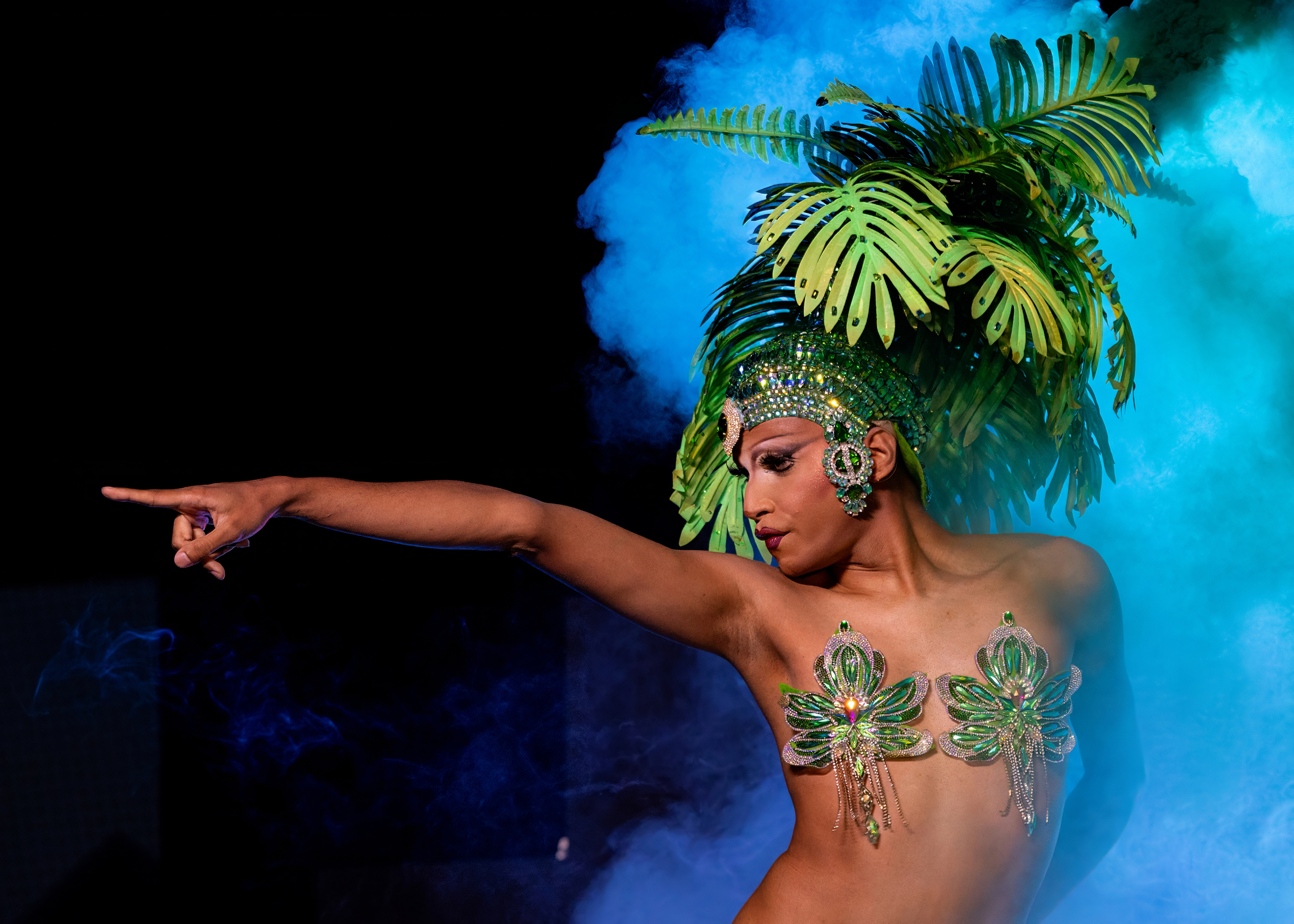
- Bombae performing in 2025
- Born: Mudit Ganguly; Mumbai, India
- Occupation: Drag queen
- Television: Canada's Drag Race (season 3)

Bombae is the stage name of Mudit Ganguly, an Indian-Canadian drag performer who competed on season 3 of Canada's Drag Race.

== Career ==
Bombae is a drag performer. She watched drag through internationally televised episodes of Ru Paul's Drag Race while living in India. After moving to Toronto, Ontario, she began to attend live shows. In the late 2010s, she first performed during Pride Toronto. After receiving positive feedback, she decided to continue. Her drag mother is Halal Bae. Russ Martin of Xtra Magazine described her style as "deeply weird and wonderful". When asked to describe her style in three words, Bombae chose "Chaotic. Disaster. Model."

Bombae competed on season 3 of Canada's Drag Race, impersonating Aziz Ansari for the Snatch Game challenge. Bombae left the season after a challenge in which contestants had to brand themselves through makeup palettes. Regarding the end of her time on Drag Race, Bombae indicated that she felt her makeup had been misunderstood, but expressed willingness to return for an all-stars series.

Bombae's Indian heritage influenced her drag. During her Drag Race season, she wore an outfit inspired by Kathakali, a traditional Indian dance, for a section titled "Goddesses of the Ancient World". Her final runway performance on Drag Race drew from the colours of the Hindu holiday of Holi. Bombae has stated that she wants gay people from South Asia to take her as an example of being able to live openly by leaving the region, as well as to use her performances to make people think about drag, gender, culture.

== Personal life ==
Bombae lives in Toronto. She relocated from Mumbai in 2016. She uses the pronouns she/her in drag. She has streamed a series titled The Gays Are Fighting on Twitch with Russ Martin, with elements including "helium karaoke [and] frat party drinking games".

== Filmography ==
=== Television ===
- Canada's Drag Race (season 3)
- Bring Back My Girls (2023)
