= Halal Bae =

Egyptian-born Canadian drag performer

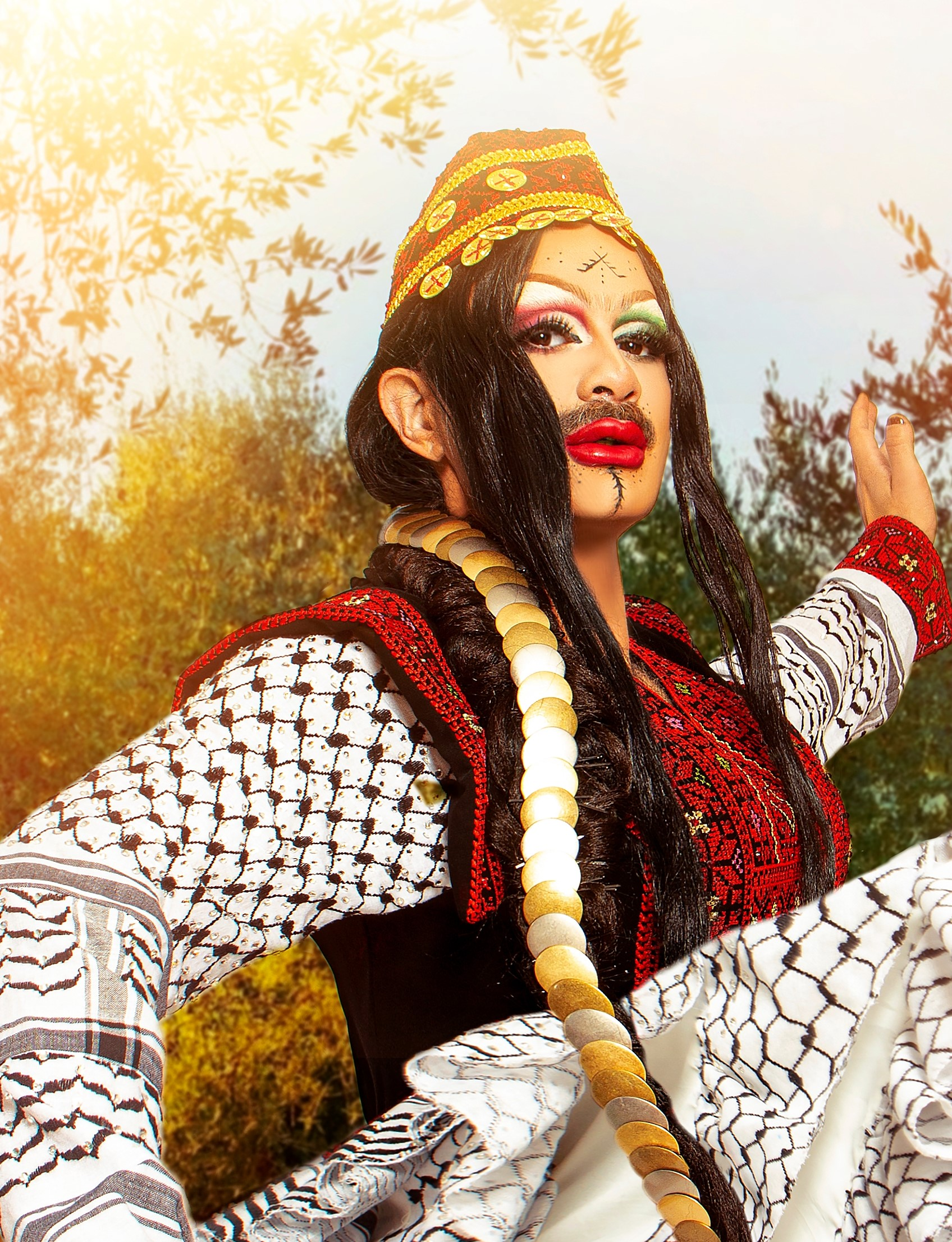
- Halal Bae
- Born: Alexandria, Egypt
- Occupation: Drag queen
- Television: Canada's Drag Race (season 3)

Halal Bae is an Egyptian-born Canadian drag performer from Toronto, Ontario who competed on season 3 of Canada's Drag Race.

== Early life ==
Halal Bae was born in Egypt and is of Egyptian-Palestinian ancestry. She was raised by a Muslim family in the Middle East, before immigrating to Canada at the age of 18.

== Career ==
Halal Bae is a drag performer. She gained prominence in Toronto, and was named the city's best drag performer by NOW Magazine in 2020. She competed on the third season of Canada's Drag Race, becoming the first North African performer on the franchise. Halal Bae was also the first contestant to have a mustache, which Screen Rant said "[expanded] the idea of what it means to be a drag performer and how drag queens must look to be considered valid". Tobin Ng of Broadview said Halal Bae received praise on social media "for bringing Muslim and Middle Eastern representation to the show", and Michel Cook of Instinct magazine wrote, "Not only did they help shatter stereotypes as to what a queer Muslim person truly is, Bae is the first North African person to hit the Drag Race competition."

== Personal life ==
Halal Bae is queer and based in Toronto. CBC News has described her as an "Arab Muslim activist queen". Halal Bae likes to focus on social work, community building, and has said: "For me, drag is used as a political tool, as a means of expressing my artistic practice, of community-building."

According to The New Arab, she is "a staunch supporter of a free Palestine".

Halal Bae uses the pronouns she/her in drag and he/they out of drag.
