= Lady Boom Boom =

Canadian drag performer

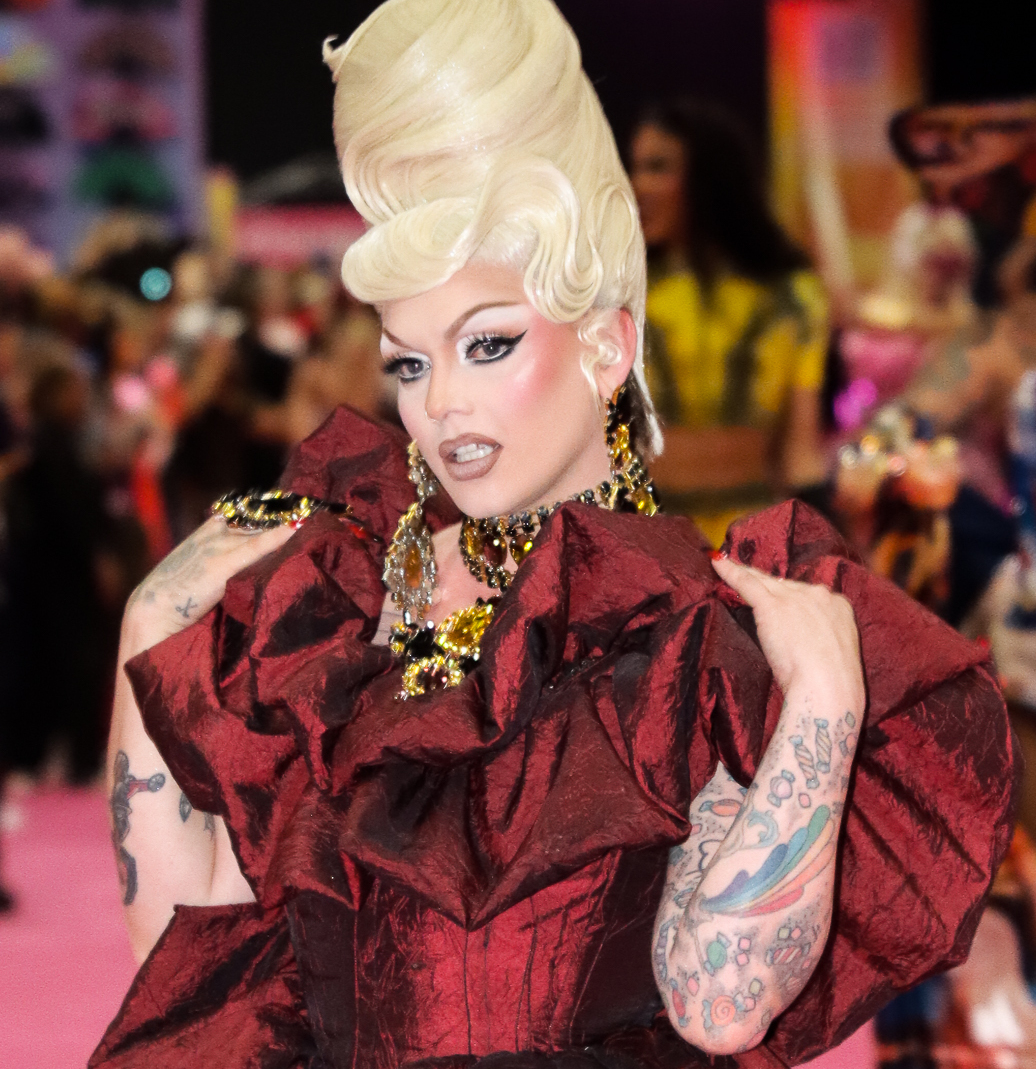
- Lady Boom Boom at RuPaul's DragCon LA, 2024
- Born: Henri Delisle Langlois
- Occupation: Drag queen
- Television: Canada's Drag Race (season 3)

Lady Boom Boom is the stage name of Henri Delisle Langlois, a Canadian drag performer who competed on season 3 of Canada's Drag Race.

== Education ==
Lady Boom Boom is trained in design.

== Career ==
In 2017, she participated in Ils de jour, elles de nuit, an Ici ARTV documentary series about drag queens, alongside Barbada de Barbades, Gaby, Rita Baga, Lady Pounana and Tracy Trash.

Lady Boom Boom is a drag performer. In 2022, she competed on season 3 of Canada's Drag Race. She impersonated Mado Lamotte for the Snatch Game challenge, and was subsequently eliminated from the competition after placing in the bottom two and losing a lip-sync against Kimmy Couture to "Run Away with Me" (2015) by Carly Rae Jepsen. Lady Boom Boom has also hosted Canada's Drag Race viewing parties in Quebec City.

== Personal life ==
Now based in Montreal, Lady Boom Boom is originally from Quebec City.

== Filmography ==
=== Television ===
- Canada's Drag Race (season 3)
- Bring Back My Girls (2023)
