= Gisèle Lullaby =

French Canadian drag performer

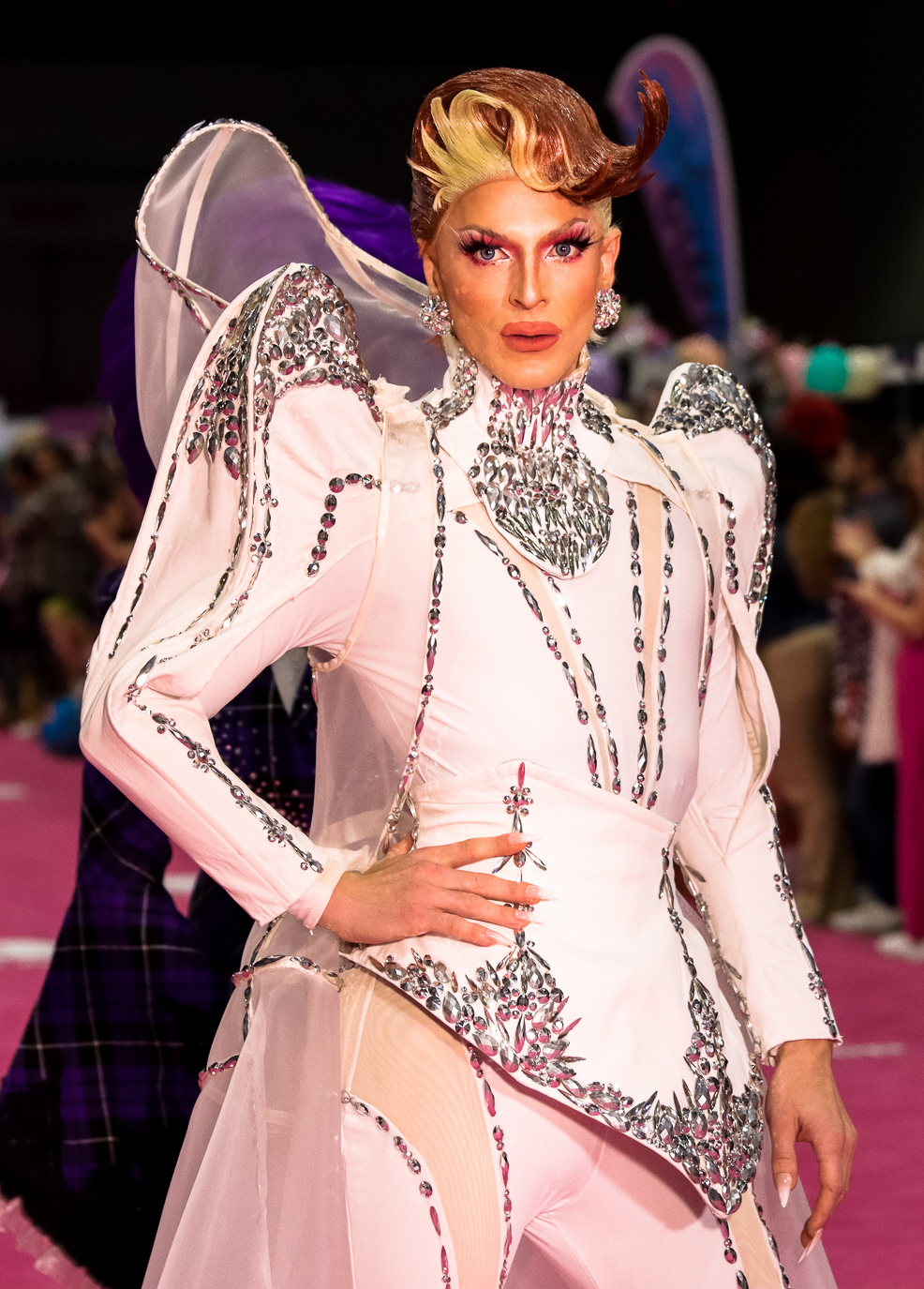
- Gisèle Lullaby at RuPaul's DragCon LA, 2023
- Born: Simon Gosselin; August 1, 1988 (age 36); Boucherville, Quebec, Canada
- Television: Canada's Drag Race (season 3)
- Website: giselelullaby.com

Gisèle Lullaby is the stage name of Simon Gosselin (born August 1, 1988), a French Canadian drag performer most known for winning the third season of Canada's Drag Race.

== Career ==
Originally from Boucherville, Quebec, Gosselin began as a backup dancer for drag queens at Cabaret Mado, but did not perform in drag himself until a 2009 birthday party for Montreal nightlife personality Franky Dee, when he was convinced to do drag and perform to Beyoncé's "Single Ladies". She has been a longtime host of her own Tuesday night show, Full Gisèle, at Cabaret Mado.

In 2020, Gisèle Lullaby participated in Saint-Jeanne, an LGBTQ-inclusive Saint-Jean-Baptiste Day livestream coordinated by singer-songwriter Safia Nolin.

Gisèle Lullaby competed on the third season of Canada's Drag Race. After being safe for first 3 episodes, in episode 4 she won the design challenge, she then impersonated Marie Curie for the Snatch Game challenge, receiving praise for her black comedy routine about Curie suffering increasing effects of radiation sickness, pulling from a historical figure not traditionally seen as a source of comedy. She was named the winner of the season in the finale. His victory also marked the first time a Quebec native and resident won the title. In addition, he is the first Francophone contestant (although he speaks English as a second language) to win the Canadian title as well as the fourth French-speaking winner in the Drag Race franchise.

On September 18, 2022, Gisèle Lullaby presented an award at the Prix Gémeaux ceremony alongside Rita Baga, Barbada de Barbades and Mona de Grenoble.

In 2022, she joined the record label So Fierce Music and partnered up with music producer Velvet Code to create the song Je Ne Sais Quoi.

== Personal life ==
Gosselin is from Boucherville, but is now living in Montreal, Quebec. Before deciding to make drag her career, Gisèle wanted to do theater.

== Filmography ==
=== Television ===
Year	Title	Role	Notes
2021	Qui sait chanter?	Herself	Guest
2022	Canada's Drag Race	Herself	Winner (Season 3)
2022	Tout le monde en parle	Herself	Guest, Ici Radio-Canada Télé
2023	Drags – Les reines de la pop!	Herself	
2024	Canada's Drag Race	Herself	Guest (Season 4)

=== Web series ===
Year	Title	Role	Notes	Ref
2022	After the Sashay	Herself	Guest by Xtra! Magazine	
2022	Fugues Entrevue	Herself	Guest by Fugues Magazine	
2022	Chats with iHeartRadio	Herself	Guest by iHeartRadio Canada	
2023	Bring Back My Girls	Herself		

Preceded by Icesis Couture	Winner of Canada's Drag Race; Canada season 3	Succeeded by Venus
