= Irma Gerd =

Canadian drag performer

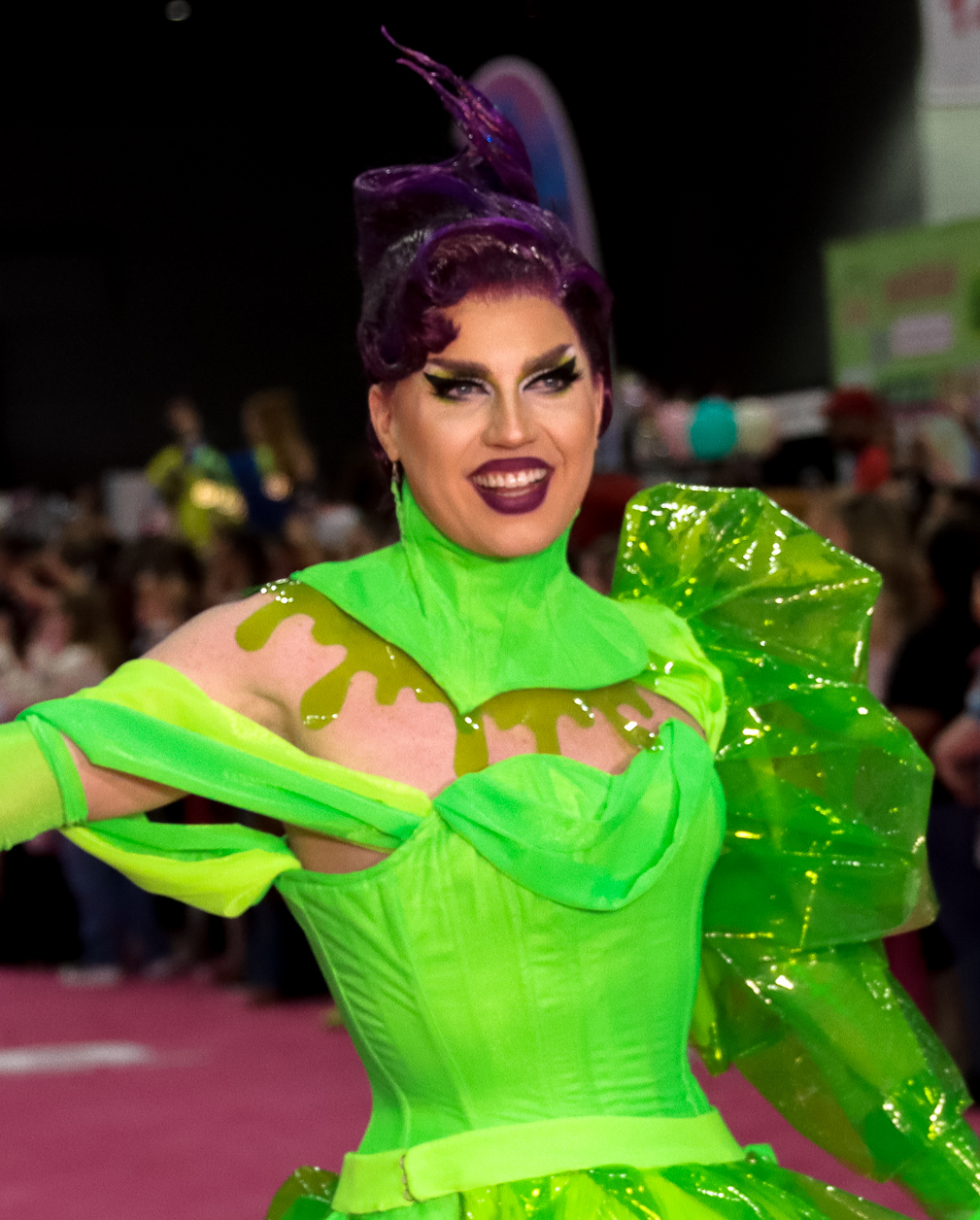
- Irma Gerd at RuPaul's DragCon LA, 2023
- Born: Jason Wells; September 24, 1989 (age 36); Corner Brook, Newfoundland, Canada
- Television: Canada's a Drag (season 2); Canada's Drag Race (season 3)
- Website: queenirmagerd.com

Irma Gerd is the stage name of Jason Wells (born September 24, 1989), a Canadian drag performer who is best known for competing on the third season of Canada's Drag Race, where she placed sixth.

== Early life ==
Wells is originally from Corner Brook.

== Career ==
Irma Gerd began performing in 2012. She is a founding member of the non-binary drag collective, the Phlegm Fatales. Irma Gerd hosted Drag Race viewing parties at Valhalla Tavern in St. John's, as of 2018. She was featured on the third season of Canada's Drag Race. On Canada's Drag Race she became the first contestant from Atlantic Canada to compete on the show.

== Personal life ==
Wells uses the pronouns they/them out of drag and she/her in drag.

== Filmography ==
=== Television ===
Year	Title	Role	Notes
2019	Canada's a Drag	Herself	Season 2
2022	Canada's Drag Race	Herself	Season 3; contestant (6th place)

=== Web series ===
Year	Title	Role	Notes	Ref
2022	After the Sashay	Herself	Guest by Xtra Magazine	
2022	CBC News	Herself	Guest by CBC NL - Newfoundland and Labrador	

- Bring Back My Girls (2023)
