= Vivian Vanderpuss =

Canadian drag performer

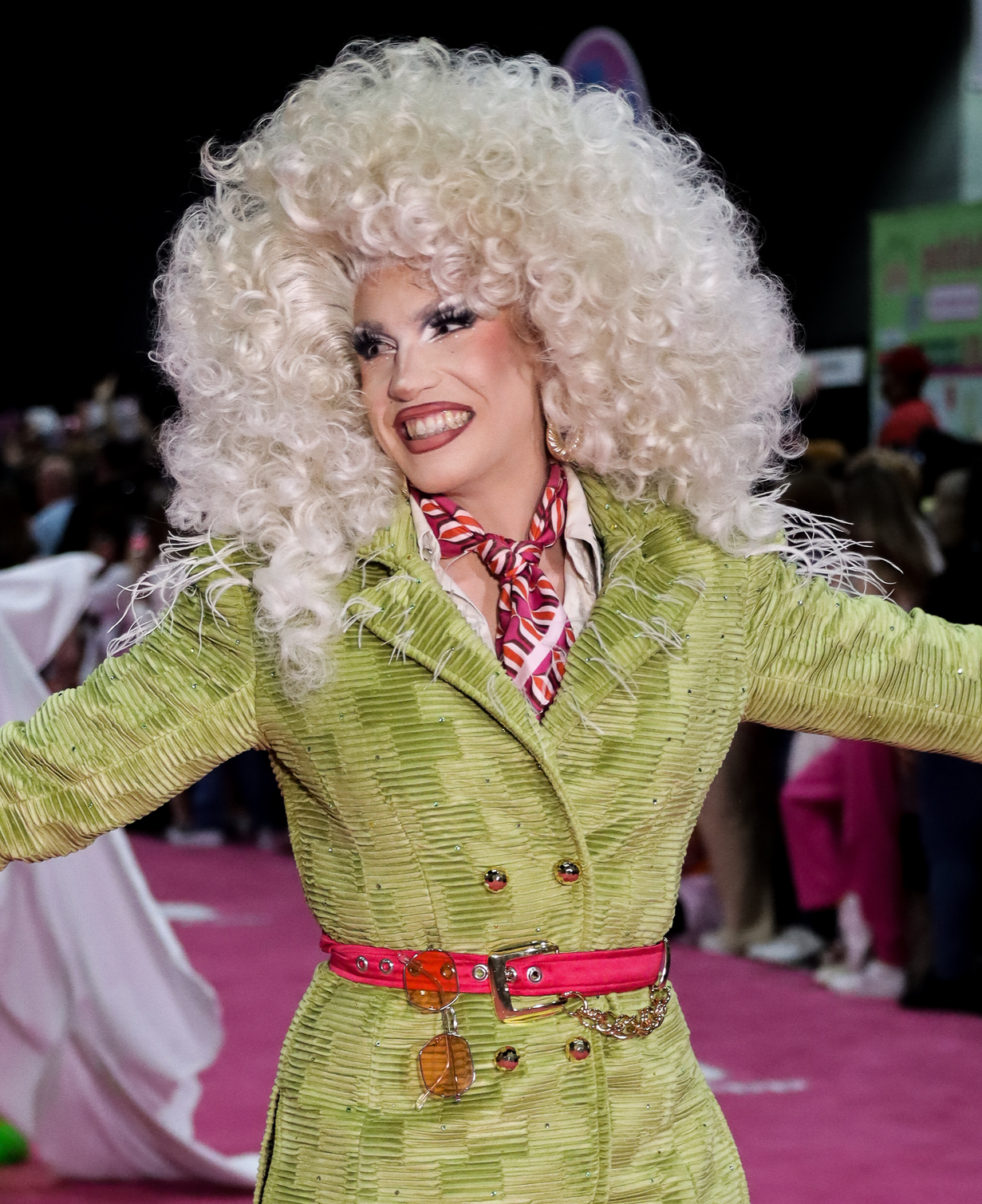
- Vivian Vanderpuss at RuPaul's DragCon LA, 2023
- Born: Mackenzie Lemire; Kingsville, Ontario, Canada
- Occupation: Drag performer
- Website: vivianvanderpuss.com

Vivian Vanderpuss is the stage name of Mackenzie Lemire, a Canadian drag performer most known for competing on the third season of Canada's Drag Race, winning the title of Miss Congeniality.

== Early life ==
Lemire is originally from Kingsville, Ontario and now resides in Victoria, British Columbia.

== Career ==
She was featured in the docu-series Canada's a Drag.

In summer 2023, the Victoria-based Phillips Brewing and Malting company introduced Cat Kiss Prickly Pear Mojito Gose, a special limited-edition beer with Vivian Vanderpuss on the label, as a charitable fundraiser for the Vancouver Island Persons Living with HIV/AIDS Society and Skipping Stone.

== Personal life ==
Lemire uses the pronouns he/him out of drag and she/her in drag.

== Filmography ==
| Year | Title | Genre | Role | Notes |
|---|---|---|---|---|
| 2020 | Canada's a Drag | TV | Herself | Guest; Season 3, episode 10 |
| 2022 | Canada's Drag Race | TV | Contestant | 5th place; Season 3 Miss Congeniality (9 episodes) |
| 2023 | Bring Back My Girls | | | |
| 2025 | Lucid | Horror film | Syd/The Monster | |
