= Jada Shada Hudson =

Barbadian-Canadian drag performer

- Born: Dwight Giraud; Barbados
- Occupation: Drag queen
- Television: Canada's Drag Race (season 3)
- Website: jadahudson.com

Jada Shada Hudson is the stage name of Dwight Giraud, a Barbadian-Canadian drag performer who competed on season 3 of Canada's Drag Race and season 1 of Canada's Drag Race All Stars.

== Career ==
Jada Shada Hudson is a drag performer. She has performed at drag shows in Toronto.

Jada Shada Hudson competed on season 3 of Canada's Drag Race, ultimately placing as runner-up. She impersonated Saucy Santana for the Snatch Game challenge. Before the final episode, Jada Shada Hudson had won one challenge and placed in the bottom twice. She has also appeared in the CBC Gem web series Queens.

== Personal life ==
Giraud was raised in Bridgetown, Barbados. He relocated to Canada in 2009.

== Filmography ==
=== Television ===
- Canada's Drag Race (season 3)
- Bring Back My Girls (2023)
- Slaycation (season 1)
