= Miss Fiercalicious =

Canadian drag performer

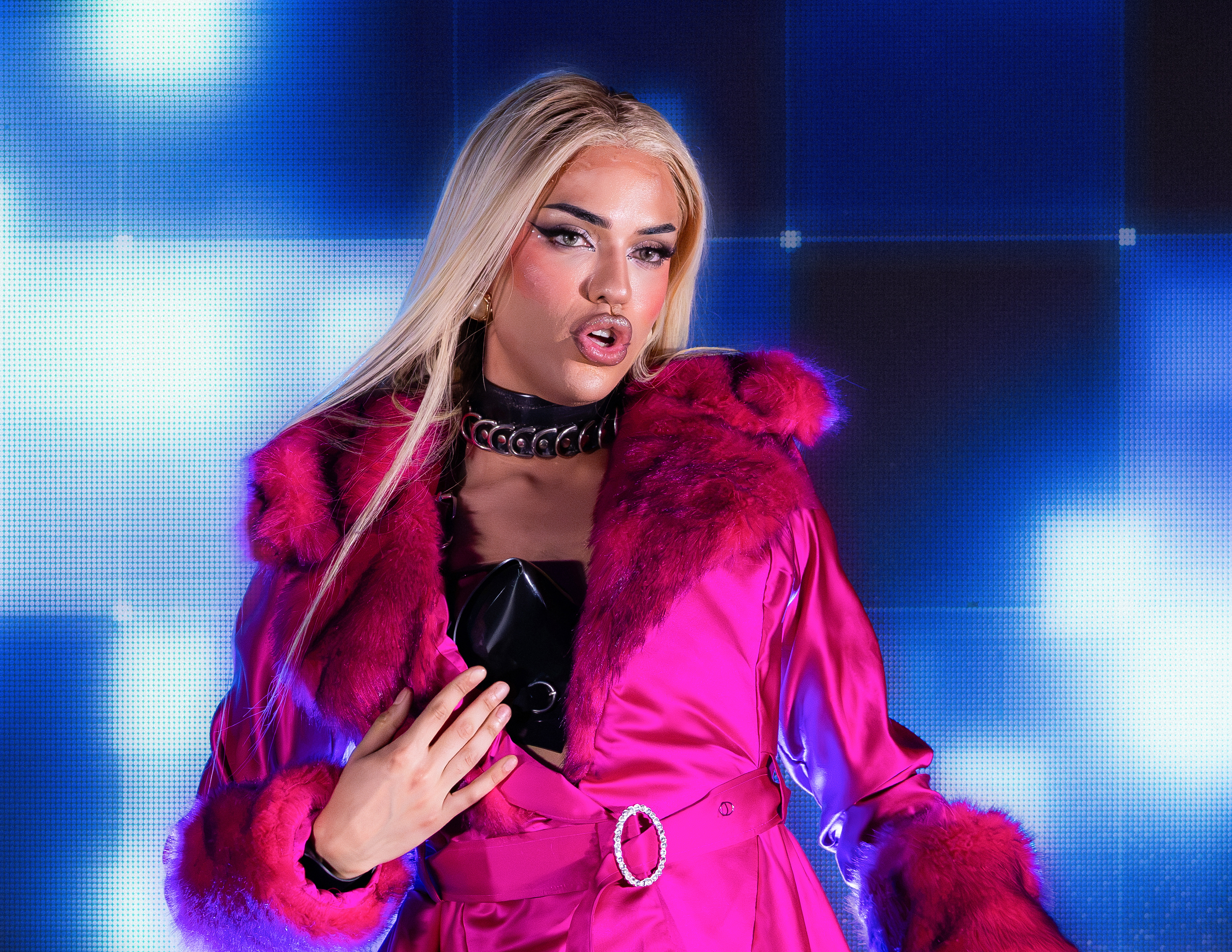
- Miss Fiercalicious performing in 2026
- Born: Paulo Fortes; August 7, 1996 (age 30); Toronto, Ontario, Canada
- Education: University of Western Ontario
- Occupation: Drag performer
- Television: Canada's Drag Race (season 3); The Traitors (season 1); Canada's Drag Race: Canada vs. the World (season 2)

Miss Fiercalicious is the stage name of Paulo Fortes (born August 7, 1996), a Canadian drag performer who competed on the third season of Canada's Drag Race, the first season of The Traitors Canada, and the second season of Canada's Drag Race: Canada vs. the World.

== Education ==
Fortes studied at the University of Western Ontario where he majored in Biology, and minored in French.

== Career ==
Miss Fiercalicious competed on season 3 of Canada's Drag Race, placing in the top four. She eliminated Chelazon Leroux from the competition, after placing in the bottom two of the "Ruets" challenge and winning a lip-sync to "Don't Call Me Baby" by Kreesha Turner. Miss Fiercalicious impersonated Kourtney Kardashian for the Snatch Game challenge. This aired in 2022.

She appeared on the first season of the Canadian series The Traitors. This aired in 2023. She also appeared in the film Jump, Darling (2020), as well as the music video for Lights' song "Prodigal Daughter".

== Personal life ==
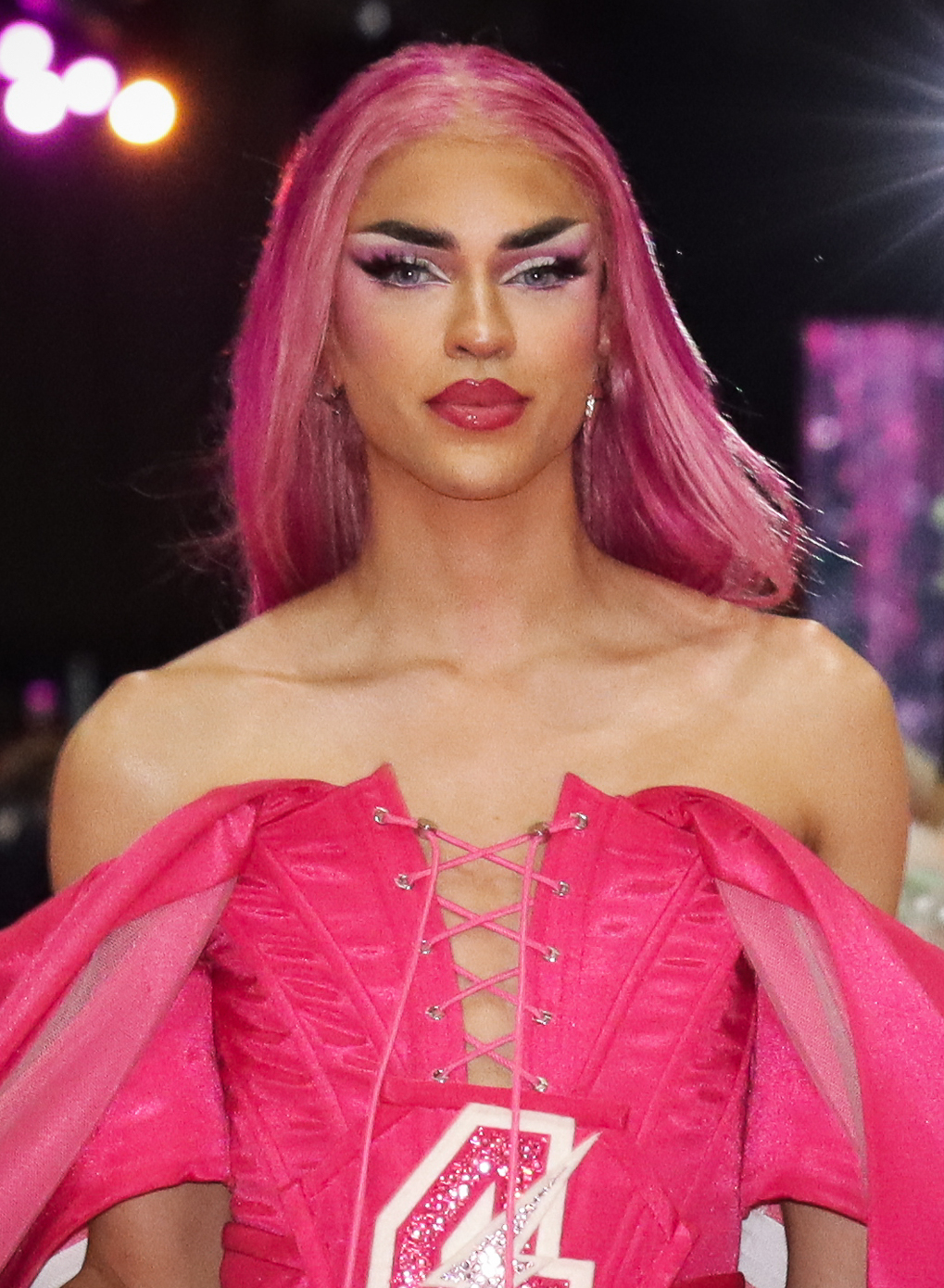
Miss Fiercalicious at RuPaul's DragCon LA, 2024

Miss Fiercalicious is based in Toronto. She uses the pronouns she/her in drag and he/him/they out of drag.

== Filmography ==
=== Films ===
Year	Title	Role	Notes
2020	Jump, Darling	Herself	

=== Television ===
Year	Title	Role	Notes
2021	Sort Of	Herself	
2021	Canada's Drag Race	Herself	Contestant; season 3
2023	The Traitors Canada	Herself	Contestant; season 1
2024	Canada's Drag Race: Canada vs. the World	Herself	Contestant; season 2

=== Web ===
Year	Title	Role	Notes
2021	Cosmo Queens	Herself	
2023	Bring Back My Girls	Herself	Canada's Drag Race season 3 reunion

== See also ==
- List of University of Western Ontario people
