= Snatch Game (Canada's Drag Race season 2) =

- Canada's Drag Race episode
- Episode no.: Season 2 Episode 4
- Original air date: November 4, 2021

Guest appearances
- Connor Jessup (guest judge); Boman Martinez-Reid

Episode chronology
← Previous "Screech"	Next → "Bye Flop"
- Canada's Drag Race season 2

"Snatch Game" is the fourth episode of the second season of the Canadian reality competition television series Canada's Drag Race, which aired on November 4, 2021, on the television network Crave. The episode sees contestants improving celebrity impersonations while playing the Snatch Game. Connor Jessup is the guest judge, who is joined by alternating judge Traci Melchor and regular panelists Brooke Lynn Hytes and Brad Goreski.

The episode won a Canadian Screen Award for Best Picture Editing, Reality/Competition at the 10th Canadian Screen Awards.

== Episode ==
The mini-challenge is the queens read each other, inspired by the documentary Paris is Burning. Icesis Couture wins the challenge.

For the maxi challenge the queens will compete in the annual Snatch Game, where they must improvise as celebrity characters on a panel, a parody of Match Game. Snatch Game players are regular judge Brad Goreski and social media personality Boman "Bomanizer" Martinez-Reid. Similar to last season's Snatch Game the queens walk the "sh-etalk" red carpet before the game. The celebrities impersonated are:

- Adriana as Sofía Vergara
- Eve 6000 as Bernie Sanders
- Gia Metric as Jim Carrey (as Ace Ventura from Ace Ventura: Pet Detective)
- Icesis Couture as La Veneno
- Kendall Gender as Kris Jenner
- Kimora Amour as Leslie Jones
- Pythia as Grimes
- Suki Doll as Yoko Ono
- Synthia Kiss as Rachel Zoe

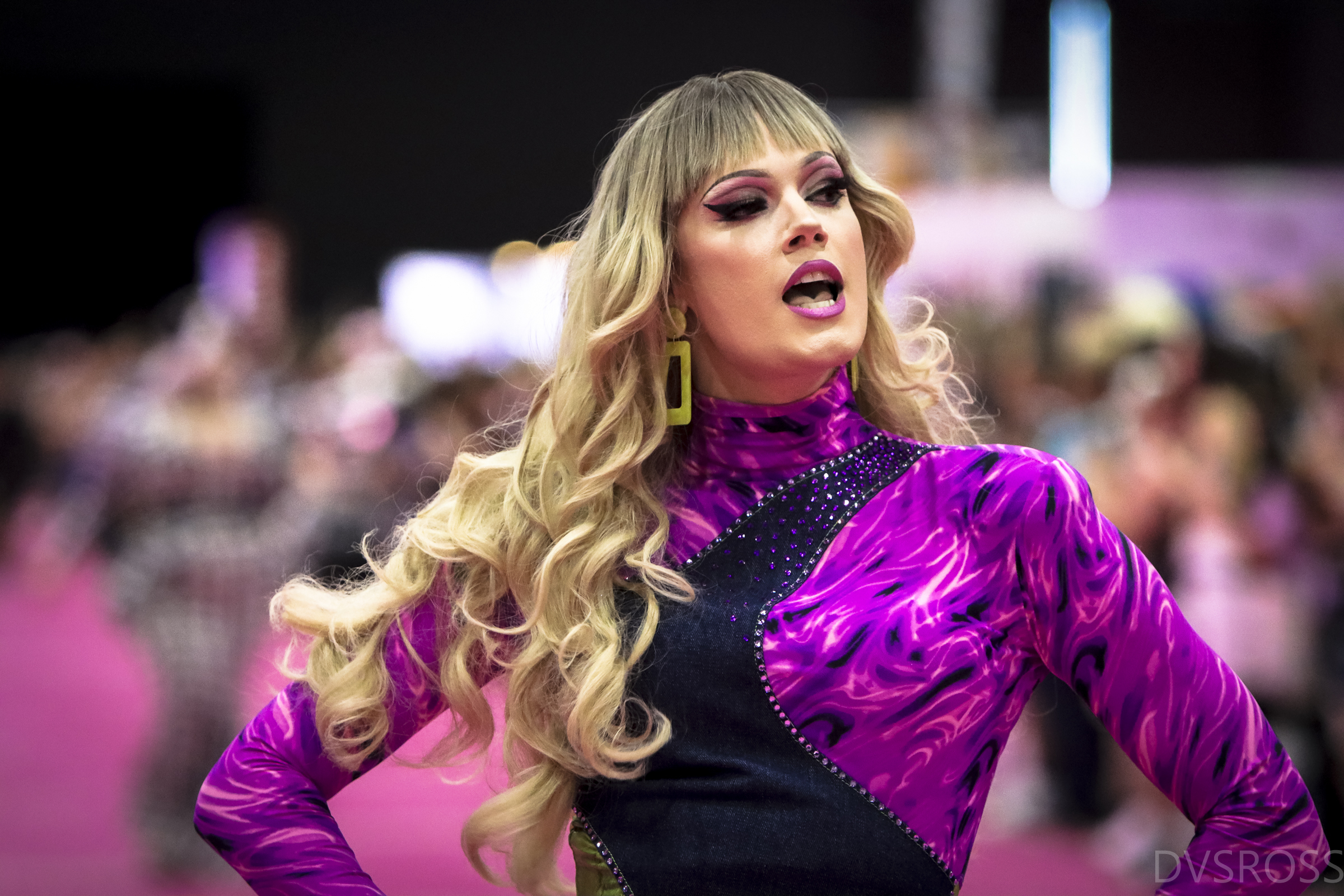
Synthia Kiss wins the Snatch Game for her portrayal of Rachel Zoe.

On the runway regular panellists Brooke Lynn Hytes and Brad Goreski are joined by alternating judge Traci Melchor and guest judge Connor Jessup. The runway theme is 'Made in Canada' where the queens wear looks inspired by Canadian screen icons. Adriana does Vanessa Morgan, Eve 6000 does Carrie-Anne Moss, Gia Metric does Mike Myers as Austin Powers , Icesis Couture and Suki Doll do Sandra Oh, Kendall Gender does Stacey McKenzie, Kimora Amour does Deborah Cox as Josephine Baker, Pythia does Catherine O'Hara, and Synthia Kiss does Jeanne Beker. The best and worst performers of the week are Adriana, Eve 6000, Kimora Amour, Pythia, Suki Doll, and Synthia Kiss.

Synthia Kiss is declared the winner of the challenge, with Adriana, Kimora Amour, and Pythia are safe. Eve 6000 and Suki Doll are up for elimination and lip sync to "Happiness" by KAPRI. Eve 6000 wins the lip sync and Suki Doll is eliminated.

== Reception ==
The episode won a Canadian Screen Award for Best Picture Editing, Reality/Competition for Baun Mah at the 10th Canadian Screen Awards in April 2022. It beat Canada's Drag Race's other two nominations in the category: "Screech" and "Under the Big Top".

== See also ==
- Snatch Game (Canada's Drag Race season 1)
- Snatch Game (Canada's Drag Race season 3)
