= Under the Big Top (Canada's Drag Race) =

- Canada's Drag Race episode
- Episode no.: Season 2 Episode 2
- Original air date: October 21, 2021

Guest appearance
- Hollywood Jade

Episode chronology
| ← Previous "Lost and Fierce" | Next → "Screech" |
- Canada's Drag Race season 2

"Under the Big Top" is the second episode of the second season of the Canadian reality competition television series Canada's Drag Race, which aired on October 21, 2021 on the television network Crave. In this episode the queens act and sing live in a circus-themed Rusical.

Choreographer Hollywood Jade is the guest judge who is joined by regular panelists Brooke Lynn Hytes and Brad Goreski and alternating judge Traci Melchor.

The episode was nominated for three Canadian Screen Awards at the 10th Canadian Screen Awards in April 2022, winning one for Best Direction, Reality/Competition.

== Episode ==
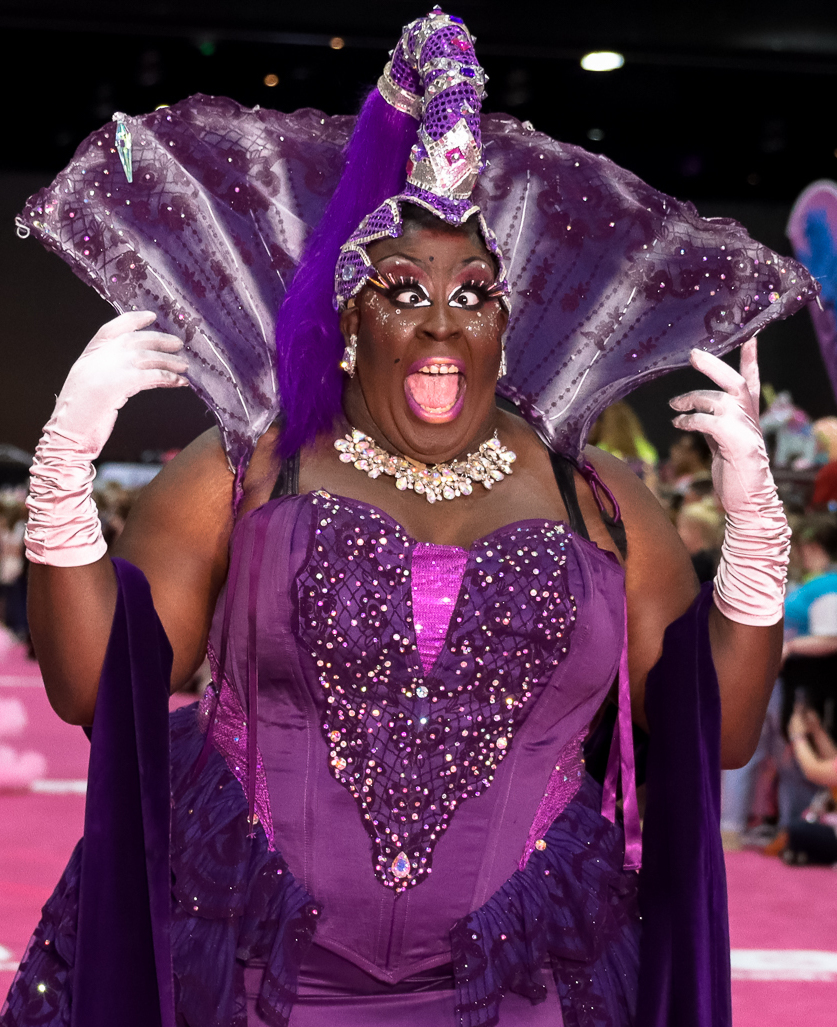
The episode sees Océane Aqua-Black eliminated from the competition.

For the mini challenge, the contestants get into "quick drag" to compete in the "Queen of my Neighbourhood Pageant", where they model a look representing their neighbourhoods: Adriana and Océane Aqua-Black from Vieux-Quebec, Eve 6000 from Church Street, Toronto, Gia Metric from Sunset Beach, Vancouver, Icesis Couture from Downtown Ottawa, Kendall Gender from Davie Village, Vancouver, Kimora Amour from Scarborough, Pythia from Ville-Marie, Montreal, Stephanie Prince from Downtown Calgary, Suki Doll from Downtown Montreal, and Synthia Kiss from West End, Vancouver. Océane Aqua-Black wins the challenge.

For the maxi challenge, the contestants perform in a live-singing circus-themed Rusical (musical theatre challenge) "Under the Big Top", the first Rusical challenge on Canada's Drag Race. The runway theme is "Circus Bizzurcus". Eve 6000, Gia Metric, Icesis Couture, Kendall Gender, Océane Aqua-Black, Pythia, and Suki Doll are chosen as the best and worst of the week.

Pythia is declared the winner of the challenge for her Pennywise inspired performance, while Icesis Couture and Océane Aqua-Black are up for elimination. The latter two face off in a lip-sync contest to "Stupid Shit" (2008) by Girlicious. Icesis Couture is declared the winner and Océane Aqua-Black is eliminated from the competition.

== Production ==
The episode first aired on Crave television and streaming on October 21, 2021.

An extended play featuring the musical numbers from the Rusical was released for streaming and digital download.

== Reception ==
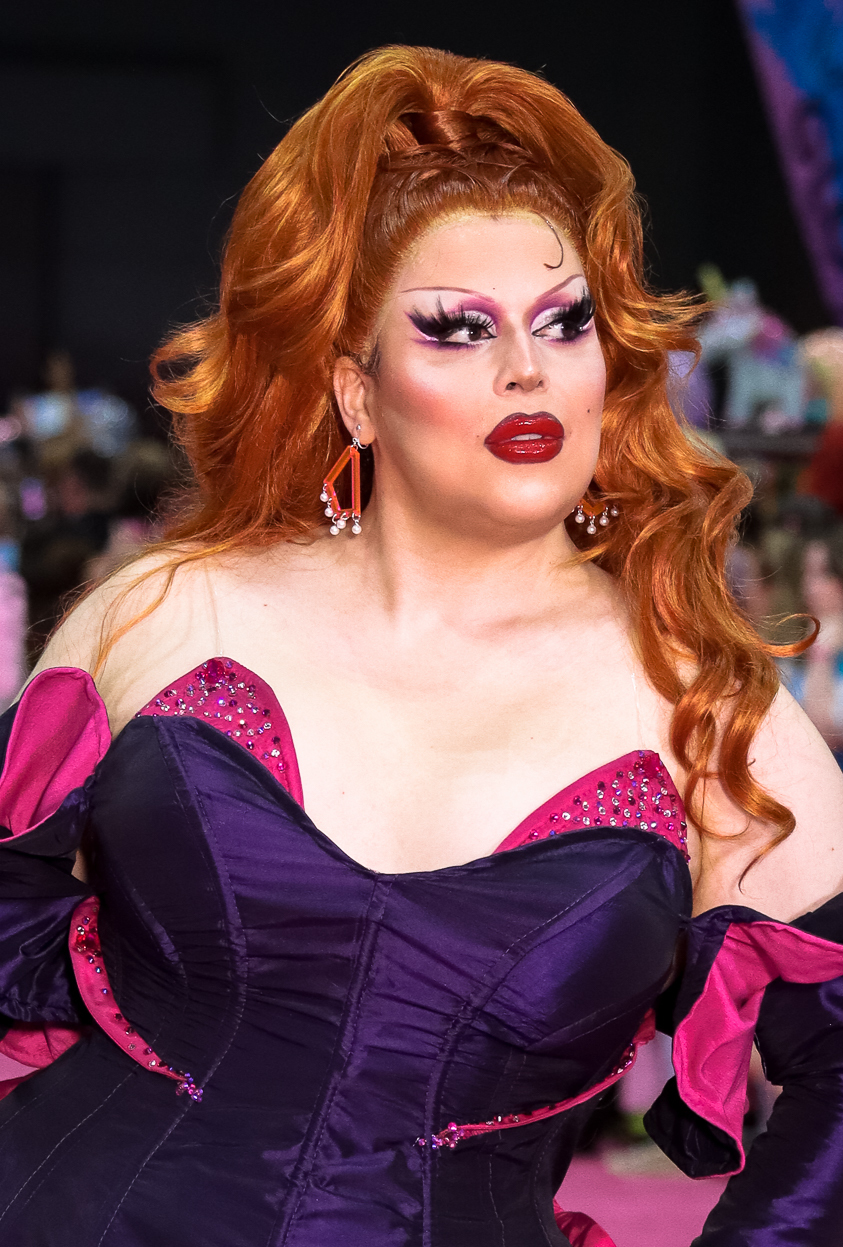
Eve 6000's (pictured in 2023) performance in the episode spawned an internet meme.

The episode was nominated for three Canadian Screen Awards at the 10th Canadian Screen Awards in April 2022. It won for Best Direction, Reality/Competition for Shelagh O'Brien. It was also nominated for Best Picture Editing, Reality Competition for Peter Topalovic, one of three nominations for Canada's Drag Race in the category for the 10th Awards. The other nomination was for Best Sound, Non-Fiction for John Diemer, Rob Taylor, Phil Nagy, Eric Leigh, Dane Kelly, and Sarah Labadie.

Eve 6000's performance as Revealina quickly became an internet meme following the episode, notably for her delivery of the first line of her song: "I've got a trick up my sleeve."

In a 2025 ranking of every rusical in Drag Race, Vulture ranked "Under the Big Top" 14th out of 47 rusicals, the second highest Canadian rusical after "Squirrels Trip: The Rusical", which ranked 10th.
