= Screech (Canada's Drag Race) =

- Canada's Drag Race episode
- Episode no.: Season 2 Episode 3
- Original air date: October 28, 2021

Guest appearances
- Fefe Dobson (Guest judge); Jimbo

Episode chronology
← Previous "Under the Big Top"	Next → "Snatch Game"
- Canada's Drag Race season 2

"Screech" is the third episode of the second season of the Canadian reality competition television series Canada's Drag Race, which aired on October 28, 2021 on the television network Crave. In this episode the queens act in a parody of a slasher film.

Singer Fefe Dobson is the guest judge who is joined by regular panelists Brooke Lynn Hytes and Brad Goreski and alternating judge Amanda Brugel.

The episode was nominated for two Canadian Screen Awards at the 10th Canadian Screen Awards in April 2022, winning for Best Writing, Lifestyle or Reality/Competition.

== Episode ==
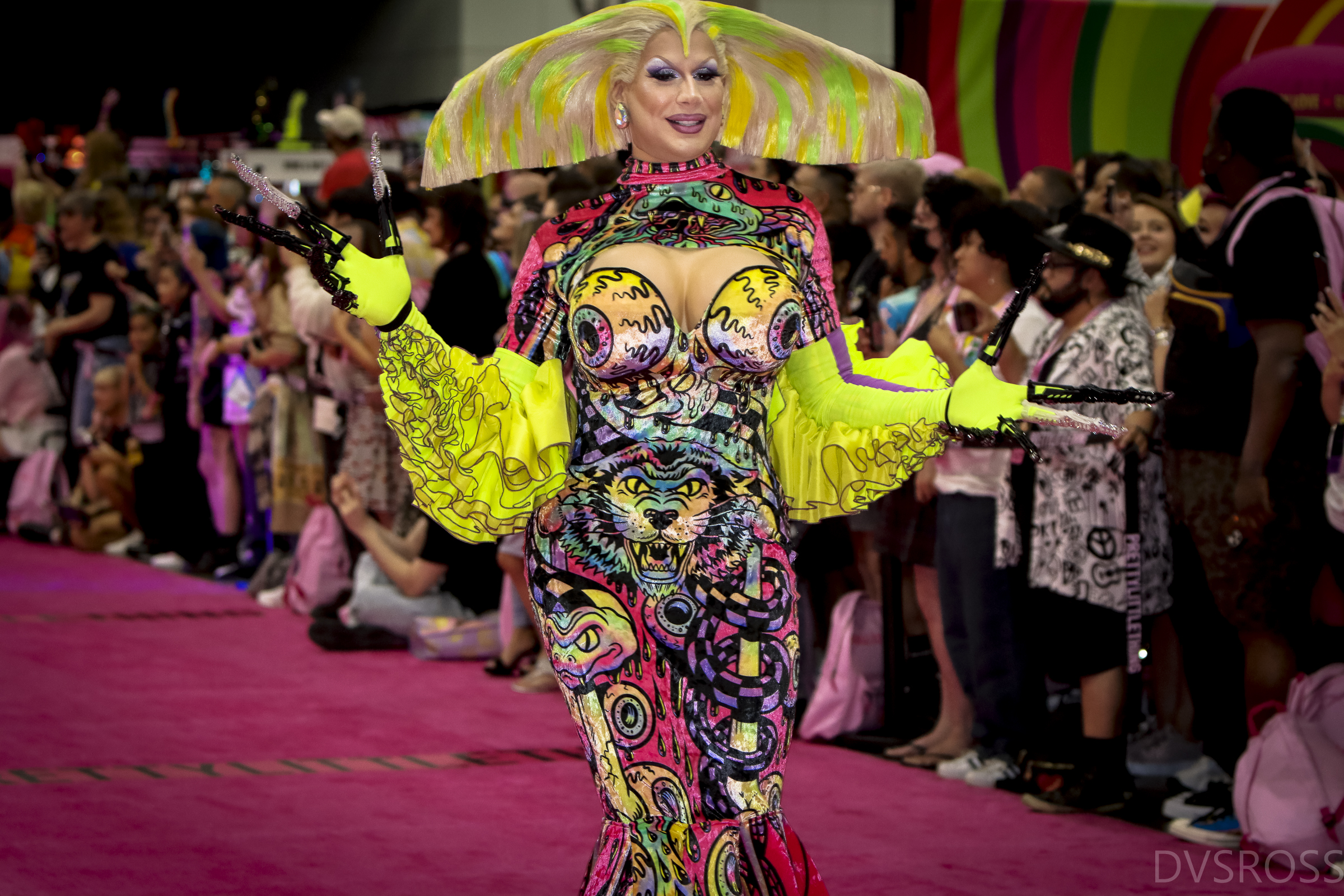
Jimbo (pictured in 2022) makes a guest appearance.

For the episode's maxi challenge the queens will act in Screech!, a parody of the slasher film genre. The name is a reference to the Newfoundland rum Screech. The film is directed by Amanda Brugel and guest judge Fefe Dobson, with Canada's Drag Race season 1 contestant Jimbo making a cameo appearance. The runway theme is Good Girl Gone Bad. The best and worst of the week are Adriana, Eve 6000, Gia Metric, Kendall Gender, Stephanie Prince, and Synthia Kiss.

Adriana wins the challenge, and Stephanie Prince and Synthia Kiss are up for elimination. They lip sync to "Ghost" by Fefe Dobson, with Synthia Kiss winning the lip sync. Stephanie Prince is eliminated.

== Reception ==
At the 10th Canadian Screen Awards in April 2022 "Screech" won the Canadian Screen Award for Best Writing, Lifestyle or Reality/Competition for Brandon Ash-Mohammed's work on the episode. It was also one of Canada's Drag Race's three nominations for Best Picture Editing, Reality/Competition, with Lindsay Ragone being nominated for her work. It lost to the Canada's Drag Race episode "Snatch Game".

== See also ==
- "Scream Queens" (RuPaul's Drag Race)
