= So Fierce Music =

Canadian record label and entertainment company

So Fierce Music is a Canadian record label and entertainment company founded by Velvet Code during the COVID-19 pandemic. The company caters to artists who have been treated as insignificant by the music industry due to their identity or background.

== History ==
So Fierce Music was founded in 2020 by Canadian musical artist Velvet Code. Velvet Code has over 20 years working in the music field along with working with Lady Gaga, and he created this record label / entertainment company due to his knowledge of how hard it can be for LGBTQ+ artists in the music industry. On September 25, 2020, the first musical release on the label was performed by artist Sofonda Cox.

== Artists ==
- Sofonda Cox
- Gisele Lullaby
- Deity Jane
- Velvet Code
- Icesis Couture
- Adriana
- Oceane Aqua-Black
- Scarlett Bobo
- Jay Light
- Brandon Hilton
- Danny Dymond
- Elle Taylor
- Jaime Adrian
- Justin Cross
- Kali Marz
- London Shanel
- Tash Riot
- Trey Mon$y
- Kalym
- Preston Faye
- Roman
- Bashful Tendencies
- Of Eden
- Lester Jay
- Juan Lords
- Naomi Leone
- Shay Dee
- London Shanel
- Jordyn Balor
- Mona Moore
- David Rabadi

== Discography ==
- Sofonda Cox - Thrive (2020)
- Sofonda Cox - Thrive, Velvet Code Remix (2021)
- London Shanel - BAD BXTCH, feat. Velvet Code (2021)
- Danny Dymond - What Do You Want, feat. Velvet Code (2021)
- Jordyn Balor - Test Drive, feat. Velvet Code (2021)
- Icesis Couture - La Pusetta, feat. Velvet Code (2021)
- Deity Jane - Hypertension Honey, feat. Velvet Code (2021)
- Mona Moore - Slay, feat. Velvet Code (2021)
- Kali Marz - S.O.S. (I Want Your Love), feat. Velvet Code (2021)
- Elle Taylor - Goddess, feat. Velvet Code (2021)
- Jay Light - Damn Daddy (2021)
- Juan Lords - Your Love or My Love (2021)
- Jaime Adrian - What Were You Drinking, feat. Velvet Code (2021)
- Kalym - Perdidos (2022)
- Preston Faye - Eros, feat. Velvet Code (2022)
- Roman - Price to Pay, feat. Velvet Code (2022)
- Oceane Aqua-Black - READDIT, feat Velvet Code (2022)
- Oceane Aqua-Black - Creampie, feat Velvet Code (2022)
- Bashful Tendencies - Press Delete (2022)
- Elle Taylor - Bussy Boy, feat. Velvet Code (2022)
- Velvet Code - As Above so Below, feat. Of Eden (2022)
- Kali Marz - Say My Name, feat. Velvet Code (2022)
- Lester Jay - Make It Right, feat. Velvet Code (2022)
- Jaime Adrian - Feed My Ego, feat. Velvet Code (2022)
- Naomi Leone - Xtravaganza, feat. Velvet Code (2022)
- Shay Dee - All Eyes on Me, feat. Velvet Code (2022)
- Gisele Lullaby - Je Ne Sais Quoi, feat. Velvet Code (2022)
