= Canada's Drag Race: Canada vs. the World season 1 =

2022 season of Canada's Drag Race: Canada vs. the World

Canada's Drag Race: Canada vs. the World
- Season 1
- Promotional poster for season one
- Hosted by: Brooke Lynn Hytes
- Judges: Brooke Lynn Hytes; Brad Goreski; Traci Melchor
- No. of contestants: 9
- Winner: Ra'Jah O'Hara
- Runner-up: Silky Nutmeg Ganache
- Miss Congeniality: Anita Wigl'it
- No. of episodes: 6

Release
- Original network: Crave (Canada); BBC Three (United Kingdom); WOW Presents Plus (International)
- Original release: November 18 – December 23, 2022

Season chronology
- Next → Season 2

The first season of Canada's Drag Race: Canada vs. the World premiered on November 18, 2022. Brooke Lynn Hytes acts as both the host and main judge, with Brad Goreski and Traci Melchor as supporting judges.

The contestants for the season were announced on October 17, 2022.

The winner of the first season of Canada's Drag Race: Canada vs. The World was Ra’Jah O’Hara, with Silky Nutmeg Ganache as the runner-up. As the winner of the season, Ra’Jah won a cash prize of $100,000 and earned the title "Queen of the Motherpucking World".

On January 11, 2023, it was officially announced through the social media channels of Canada's Drag Race that Anita Wigl'it had won the title of Miss Congeniality.

== Contestants ==
Ages, names, and cities stated are at time of filming.

Contestants of Canada's Drag Race: Canada vs. the World season 1 and their backgrounds
Contestant	Age	Hometown	Original season(s)	Original placement(s)	Outcome
Ra'Jah O'Hara (Note: Ra'Jah Davenport O'Hara is referred to as Ra'Jah O'Hara on the show.)	36	Dallas, United States	US season 11	9th place	Winner
Ra'Jah O'Hara	36	Dallas, United States	All Stars 6	Runner-up	Winner
Silky Nutmeg Ganache	31	Chicago, United States	US season 11	3rd place	Runner-up
Silky Nutmeg Ganache	31	Chicago, United States	All Stars 6	11th place	Runner-up
Rita Baga	34	Montreal, Canada	Canada season 1	Runner-up	3rd place
Victoria Scone	29	Cardiff, United Kingdom	UK series 3	10th place (Note: Victoria Scone was forced to withdraw from UK series 3 after injuring her knee.)	3rd place
Vanity Milan	30	South London, United Kingdom	UK series 3	4th place	5th place
Icesis Couture	35	Ottawa, Canada	Canada season 2	Winner	6th place (Note: Icesis Couture quit the competition prior to the main challenge.)
Anita Wigl'it	32	Auckland, New Zealand	Down Under season 1	8th place	7th place (Note: Anita Wigl'it was voted Miss Congeniality on the official Canada's Drag Race Instagram page after the show aired.)
Stephanie Prince	24	Calgary, Canada	Canada season 2	10th place	8th place
Kendall Gender	31	Vancouver, Canada	Canada season 2	Runner-up	9th place

== Contestant progress ==
Legend:

Ra'Jah O'Hara won Canada's Drag Race: Canada vs. the World season 1.
Silky Nutmeg Ganache was the runner-up.
Anita Wigl'it was voted Miss Congeniality (Miss C) after the show aired.
WIN indicates that the contestant won the challenge and the Lip Sync for the World.
TOP2 indicates that the contestant won the challenge, but lost the Lip Sync for the World.
SAFE indicates that the contestant was declared safe by the judges.
BTM (Bottom) indicates that the contestant was up for elimination.
ELIM (Eliminated) indicates that the contestant was eliminated.
QUIT indicates that Icesis Couture quit the competition.
Guest indicates that the contestant returned as a guest.

Contestants progress with placements in each episode
Contestant	Episode					
Contestant	1	2	3	4	5	6
Ra'Jah O'Hara	SAFE	TOP2	SAFE	BTM	SAFE	Winner
Silky Nutmeg Ganache	SAFE	SAFE	WIN	TOP2	BTM	Runner-up
Rita Baga	TOP2	SAFE	BTM	SAFE	WIN	Eliminated
Victoria Scone	SAFE	SAFE	TOP2	WIN	TOP2	Eliminated
Vanity Milan	WIN	SAFE	SAFE	BTM	ELIM	Guest
Icesis Couture	SAFE	WIN	SAFE	QUIT		Guest
Anita Wigl'it	SAFE	BTM	ELIM			Miss C
Stephanie Prince	BTM	ELIM				Guest
Kendall Gender	ELIM					Guest

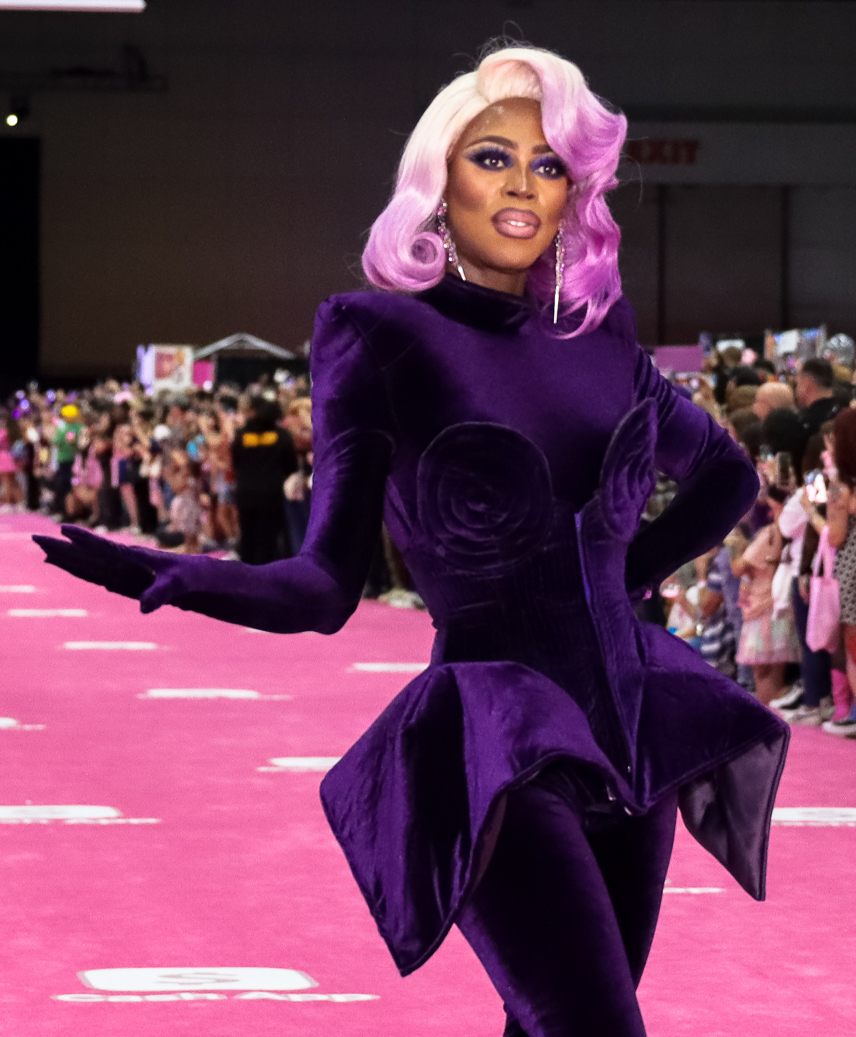
The winner, Ra'Jah O'Hara.

The premiere season featured contestants competing from the United Kingdom, Canada, New Zealand, and the United States. The season was ultimately won by Ra'Jah O'Hara, who previously competed on season 11 of RuPaul's Drag Race as well as season 6 of RuPaul's Drag Race All Stars.

== Lip syncs ==
Legend:

The contestant was eliminated after their first time in the bottom.
The contestant was eliminated after their second time in the bottom.
The contestant won the first round of the Lip Sync Smackdown for the Crown and advanced to the second.
The contestant won the second round of the Lip Sync Smackdown for the Crown and was declared the winner of the season.

Episode	Contestants (Elimination)			Song	Winner	Bottom	Eliminated
1	Rita Baga (Kendall)	vs.	Vanity Milan (Kendall)	"Brand New Bitch" (Anjulie)	Vanity Milan	Kendall, Stephanie	Kendall Gender
2	Icesis Couture (Stephanie)	vs.	Ra'Jah O'Hara (Stephanie)	"Sk8er Boi" (Avril Lavigne)	Icesis Couture	Anita, Stephanie	Stephanie Prince
3	Silky Nutmeg Ganache (Anita)	vs.	Victoria Scone (Anita)	"Nobody's Supposed to Be Here (Hex Hector Dance Mix)" (Deborah Cox)	Silky Nutmeg Ganache	Anita, Rita	Anita Wigl'it
4	Silky Nutmeg Ganache (Vanity)	vs.	Victoria Scone (Vanity)	"Your Daddy Don't Know" (Toronto)	Victoria Scone	Ra'Jah, Vanity	None
5	Rita Baga (Vanity)	vs.	Victoria Scone (Vanity)	"Freak" (Estelle ft. Kardinal Offishall)	Rita Baga	Silky, Vanity	Vanity Milan
Episode	Final contestants			Song	Winner		
6	Ra'Jah O'Hara	vs.	Victoria Scone	"Do It" (Nelly Furtado ft. Missy Elliott)	Ra'Jah O'Hara		
6	Rita Baga	vs.	Silky Nutmeg Ganache	"Broken Bones" (Love Inc.)	Silky Nutmeg Ganache		
6	Ra'Jah O'Hara	vs.	Silky Nutmeg Ganache	"River Deep, Mountain High" (Celine Dion)	Ra'Jah O'Hara		

== Guest judges ==
- Anjulie, singer
- Sarain Fox, activist
- Priyanka, winner of Canada's Drag Race Season 1
- Jeanne Beker, television personality
- Hollywood Jade, dancer and choreographer
- Gary Janetti, actor and husband of Brad Goreski
- Joe Zee, fashion stylist
- Monét X Change, contestant from RuPaul's Drag Race Season 10, winner of All Stars 4, and runner-up of All Stars 7

=== Special guests ===
Guests who appeared in episodes, but did not judge on the main stage.

Episode 2:

- Justin Trudeau, Prime Minister of Canada

Episode 6:

- Aleksandar Antonijevic, photographer

== Episodes ==
No. overall	No. in season	Title	Original release date
1	1	"Bonjour, Hi"	November 18, 2022
Nine queens from across the Drag Race franchise enter the competition. Brooke Lynn Hytes informs them that for the main challenge, the queens must be in groups of three and perform an original song: Bonjour, Hi.: Team Touché: Anita Wigl'it, Rita Baga and Victoria Scone.; Team Maple She'rups: Icesis Couture, Kendall Gender and Stephanie Prince.; Team SRV: Ra'Jah O'Hara, Silky Nutmeg Ganache and Vanity Milan.; On the runway, category is Queen of the World. Ra'Jah O'Hara, Rita Baga and Vanity Milan receive positive critiques with Rita Baga and Vanity Milan being announced as the Top 2 queens of the week. Anita Wigl'it, Kendall Gender and Stephanie Prince receive negative critiques with Anita Wigl'it being saved from the bottom. The Top 2 queens lip-sync for the world to "Brand New Bitch" by Anjulie. Vanity Milan wins the lip-sync and eliminates Kendall Gender.: Guest Judge: Anjulie; Main Challenge: Performing an original song in groups of three; Runway Theme: Queen of the World; Challenge Winners: Rita Baga and Vanity Milan; Lip-Sync Song: "Brand New Bitch" by Anjulie; Lip-Sync for The World Winner: Vanity Milan; Bottom Two: Kendall Gender and Stephanie Prince; Eliminated: Kendall Gender; Farewell Message: "It was an honour to compete with the best of the best!! To my Canadian sisters, I LOVE U! Stephanie, you deserve a chance to shine. ♡ Kendall"
2	2	"Snatch Summit"	November 25, 2022
The queens enter the Workroom and it is revealed that Rita Baga would have sent Kendall Gender home. For this week's mini-challenge, the queens play Reading is Fundamental and read each other to filth with Anita Wigl'it winning the mini-challenge. For the maxi-challenge, the queens must impersonate celebrities in the Snatch Summit.: Anita Wigl'it as Adele; Icesis Couture as Donatella Versace; Ra'Jah O'Hara as Big Freedia; Rita Baga as Guilda; Silky Nutmeg Ganache as Lizzo; Stephanie Prince as Cardi B; Vanity Milan as Spice; Victoria Scone as Kim Woodburn; Before the runway, the queens receive a special visit from the Prime Minister of Canada, Justin Trudeau. On the runway, category is Celestial Bodies. Icesis Couture and Ra'Jah O'Hara receive positive critiques and are announced as the Top 2 queens of the week. Anita Wigl'it, Silky Nutmeg Ganache, Stephanie Prince and Victoria Scone receive negative critiques with Silky Nutmeg Ganache and Victoria Scone being saved from the bottom. The Top 2 queens lip-sync for the world to "Sk8er Boi" by Avril Lavigne. Icesis Couture wins the lip-sync and eliminates Stephanie Prince.: Guest Judges: Priyanka and Sarain Fox; Mini Challenge: Reading is fundamental; Mini Challenge Winner: Anita Wigl'it; Main Challenge: Impersonate celebrities in the Snatch Summit; Runway Theme: Celestial Bodies; Challenge Winners: Icesis Couture and Ra'Jah O'Hara; Lip-Sync Song: "Sk8er Boi" by Avril Lavigne; Lip-Sync for The World Winner: Icesis Couture; Bottom Two: Anita Wigl'it and Stephanie Prince; Eliminated: Stephanie Prince; Farewell Message: "I look GOOOOD!! Good luck ya'll!! Love you!!!! Keep slaying!! – Steph. Good luck cleaning."
3	3	"The Weather Ball"	December 2, 2022
The queens enter the Workroom and it is revealed that Ra'Jah O'Hara would have sent Stephanie Prince home. For this week's maxi-challenge, the queens must show three looks for the Weather Ball: Air Body Lace, Arctic Foxy Lady and Caught in the Rain Couture. The latter look must be constructed in the Workroom using unconventional materials. On the runway, Ra'Jah O'Hara and Icesis Couture are announced as safe. Silky Nutmeg Ganache and Victoria Scone receive positive critiques and are announced as the Top 2 queens of the week. Anita Wigl'it, Rita Baga and Vanity Milan receive negative critiques with Vanity Milan being saved from the bottom. The Top 2 queens lip-sync for the world to "Nobody's Supposed to Be Here (Dance Mix)" by Deborah Cox and Hex Hector. Silky Nutmeg Ganache wins the lip-sync and eliminates Anita Wigl'it.: Guest Judges: Hollywood Jade and Jeanne Beker; Main Challenge: The Weather Ball; Runway Theme: Air Body Lace, Arctic Foxy Lady and Caught in the Rain Couture; Challenge Winners: Silky Nutmeg Ganache and Victoria Scone; Lip-Sync Song: "Nobody's Supposed to Be Here (Dance Mix)" by Deborah Cox and Hex Hector; Lip-Sync for The World Winner: Silky Nutmeg Ganache; Bottom Two: Anita Wigl'it and Rita Baga; Eliminated: Anita Wigl'it; Farewell Message: "To my queens, you can visit Down Under anytime. Come and go as you please, but know that you will always have a place in my heart. With love, Anita xxx"
4	4	"Comedy Queens"	December 9, 2022
The queens enter the Workroom and it is revealed that Victoria Scone would have sent Anita Wigl'it home. For this week's mini challenge, the queens must record personalized Cameo-style videos. Ra'Jah O'Hara wins the mini challenge and gets to assign the performance order in the main challenge. For the main challenge the queens must write and perform a comedy routine. Prior to the main challenge Icesis Couture informs the other queens that she will be leaving the competition due to mental health issues. On the runway, category is Plaid Girls Club. Silky Nutmeg Ganache and Victoria Scone receive positive critiques and are again announced as the Top 2 queens of the week. Rita Baga receives mixed critiques and is declared safe. Ra'Jah O'Hara and Vanity Milan receive negative critiques and are declared the bottoms of the week. The Top 2 queens lip-sync for the world to "Your Daddy Don't Know" by Toronto. Victoria Scone wins the lip-sync but before she can reveal her lipstick it is announced that no one will be eliminated this week.: Guest Judge: Gary Janetti; Mini Challenge: Record Cameo-style personalized messages; Mini Challenge Winner: Ra'Jah O'Hara; Quit: Icesis Couture; Main Challenge: Write and perform a comedy routine; Runway Theme: Plaid Girls Club; Challenge Winners: Silky Nutmeg Ganache and Victoria Scone; Lip-Sync Song: "Your Daddy Don't Know" by Toronto; Lip-Sync for The World Winner: Victoria Scone; Bottom Two: Ra'Jah O'Hara and Vanity Milan; Eliminated: None
5	5	"Spy Queens"	December 16, 2022
The queens enter the Workroom and it is revealed that Victoria Scone would have sent Vanity Milan home. Silky Nutmeg Ganache does not reveal her lipstick choice to the group but privately informs Vanity that she picked her as well. For this week's main challenge the queens must act in the spoof Spy Queens. As the winner of last week's lip-sync Victoria gets to assign the roles: Ra'Jah O'Hara as The Body Ody Ody, Rita Baga as The Mother of the House, Silky Nutmeg Ganache as The Lip Sync Assassin, Vanity Milan as The Look Queen, and Victoria Scone as The Reading Fundamentalist. On the runway, category is Y2Gay: 2000s Club Kids. Ra'Jah O’Hara, Rita Baga and Victoria Scone receive positive with Rita Baga and Victoria Scone are announced as the Top 2 queens of the week and Ra'Jah O'Hara is declared safe. Silky Nutmeg Ganache and Vanity Milan receive negative critiques leaving them as the bottoms of the week. The Top 2 queens lip-sync for the world to "Freak" by Estelle ft. Kardinal Offishall. Rita Baga wins the lip-sync and eliminates Vanity Milan.: Guest Judge: Joe Zee; Main Challenge: Act in the spoof Spy Queens; Runway Theme: Y2Gay: 2000s Club Kids; Challenge Winners: Rita Baga and Victoria Scone; Lip-Sync Song: "Freak" by Estelle ft. Kardinal Offishall; Lip-Sync for The World Winner: Rita Baga; Bottom Two: Silky Nutmeg Ganache and Vanity Milan; Eliminated: Vanity Milan; Farewell Message: ”When I’m doubt Twerk it out! Love ya! Keep killing it Vanity”
6	6	"Grand Finale"	December 23, 2022
The queens enter the Workroom and it is revealed that Victoria Scone again would have sent Vanity Milan home. The next day it is announced that the season will culminate in a lip-sync smackdown for the crown. The queens are then interviewed by guest judge Monét X Change, who also coaches them in a cosmic-themed photo shoot. On the runway, category is Coronation Eleganza Extravaganza. After the judges' final critiques and appearances by the eliminated queens the lip-sync smackdown begins. The first lip-sync is between Ra'Jah O'Hara and Victoria Scone. They lip-sync to "Do It" by Nelly Furtado ft. Missy Elliott. Ra'Jah O'Hara wins the lip-sync and Victoria Scone is eliminated. The second lip-sync is between Rita Baga and Silky Nutmeg Ganache. They lip-sync to "Broken Bones" by Love Inc. Silky Nutmeg Ganache wins the lip-sync and Rita Baga is eliminated. The final lip-sync is between Ra'Jah O'Hara and Silky Nutmeg Ganache. They lip-sync to "River Deep – Mountain High" by Celine Dion. Following the lip-sync it is announced that Ra'Jah O'Hara is the winner, leaving Silky Nutmeg Ganache as the runner-up.: Guest Judge: Monét X Change; Runway Theme: Coronation Eleganza Extravaganza; Miss Congeniality: Anita Wigl'it; Final Four: Ra'Jah O'Hara, Rita Baga, Silky Nutmeg Ganache and Victoria Scone; Lip-Sync Smackdown #1: Ra'Jah O'Hara vs. Victoria Scone; Lip-Sync Song: "Do It" by Nelly Furtado ft. Missy Elliott; Eliminated: Victoria Scone; Lip-Sync Smackdown #2: Rita Baga vs. Silky Nutmeg Ganache; Lip-Sync Song: "Broken Bones" by Love Inc.; Eliminated: Rita Baga; Lip-Sync Smackdown #3: Ra'Jah O'Hara vs. Silky Nutmeg Ganache; Lip-Sync Song: "River Deep – Mountain High" by Celine Dion; Runner-up: Silky Nutmeg Ganache; Winner of Canada's Drag Race: Canada vs. the World Season One: Ra'Jah O'Hara

== Awards ==
Award	Date of ceremony	Category	Nominees	Result	Ref.
Canadian Cinema Editors Awards	May 2023	Best Editing in Lifestyle/Competition/Reality	Jonathan Dowler, "Grand Finale" - Canada's Drag Race: Canada vs. the World	Won	
Canadian Screen Awards	May 2024	Best Reality/Competition Program or Series	Trevor Boris, Michelle Mama, Yette Vandendam, Betty Orr, Laura Michalchyshyn, Michael Kot, Justin Stockman, Fenton Bailey, Randy Barbato, Tom Campbell, RuPaul Charles, Spencer Fritz	Won	
Canadian Screen Awards	May 2024	Host or presenter, factual or reality competition	Brooke Lynn Hytes, Brad Goreski, Traci Melchor	Won	
Canadian Screen Awards	May 2024	Casting, non-fiction	Heather Muir	Won	
Canadian Screen Awards	May 2024	Editing in a reality or competition program or series	Jonathan Dowler, "Grand Finale"	Won	
Canadian Screen Awards	May 2024	Editing in a reality or competition program or series	Kyle Power, "Comedy Queens"	Nominated	
Canadian Screen Awards	May 2024	Sound in a lifestyle, reality or entertainment program or series	John Diemer, Scott Brachmayer, Rosie Eberhard, Levi Linton, Rob Taylor, Eric Leigh and Alastair Sims, "Bonjour Hi"	Won	
Canadian Screen Awards	May 2024	Direction in a reality or competition program or series	Shelagh O'Brien, "Bonjour Hi"	Won	
Canadian Screen Awards	May 2024	Writing in a lifestyle or reality/competition program or series	Brandon Ash-Mohammed, Trevor Boris, Spencer Fritz and Kevin Hazlehurst, "Spy Queens"	Won	
