= Suki Doll =

Canadian drag performer

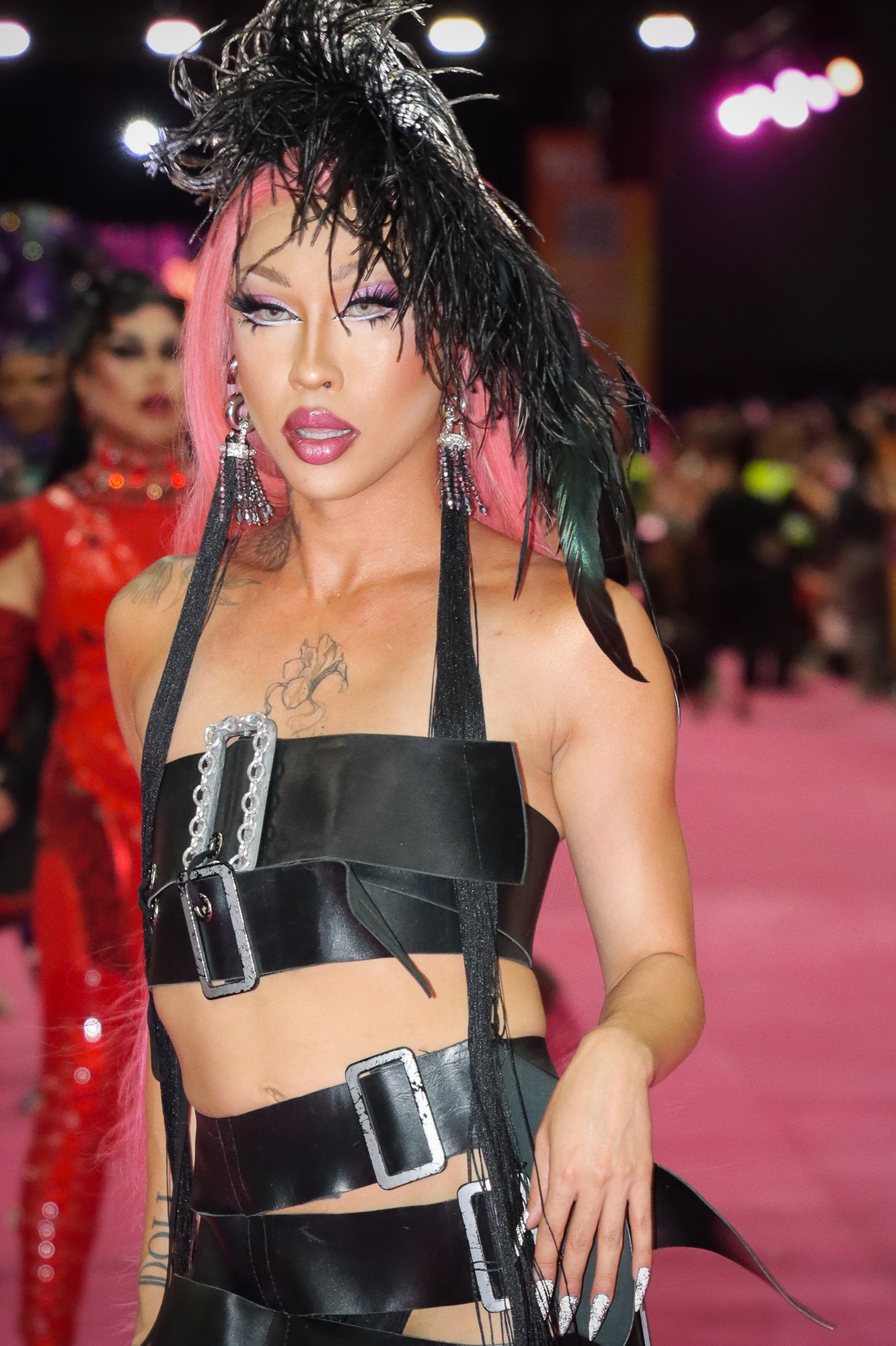
- Suki Doll at RuPaul's DragCon LA, 2024
- Born: André Pham; July 4, 1993 (age 33); Montreal, Quebec, Canada
- Occupation: Drag queen
- Television: Canada's Drag Race (season 2); Drag Race Philippines: Slaysian Royale (season 1)
- Website: thesukidoll.com

André Pham (born July 4, 1993), better known by the stage name Suki Doll, a Canadian drag performer and costume designer who competed on season 2 of Canada's Drag Race and season 1 of Drag Race Philippines: Slaysian Royale.

== Early life ==
André Pham was born on July 4, 1993 in Montreal, Quebec, Canada, one of six children. Raised in a religious household, she frequently found solace in Christina Aguilera's song "Beautiful". At a young age, her parents divorced and she and her siblings were raised by their mother, who worked three jobs to support the family while living in public housing. Pham frequently wore her mother's clothing, shoes and accessories, leading to a passion for fashion. She would later attend fashion school and cites her mother as one of her main inspirations. Pham worked as a designer in the fashion industry for a decade before turning to pursuing drag full-time after appearing on Drag Race.

== Career ==
Pham began doing drag as Leila Doll in 2013 after her then-boyfriend, a drag queen, did her makeup for the first time. She first began appearing publicly as a "shooter drag", a drag queen who sells alcoholic drinks to patrons. She competed for the title of Miss Sky in 2013 before temporarily retiring until 2017, when she competed in Drag-moi at Cabaret Mado.

Pham competed as Suki Doll on season 2 of Canada's Drag Race. Her stage name translates to "the loved one" in homage to her mother, who "taught her love and its limitless boundary". Her runways paid homage to designer Azzedine Alaïa and actress Sandra Oh. She impersonated Yoko Ono for the Snatch Game challenge. Suki was later crowned Miss Congeniality by her castmates. Following the show, Suki Doll toured with her fellow cast members. She also participated in the Courage Across Canada tour with Canada's Drag Race contestants Eve 6000, Icesis Couture, Kimmy Couture, Kimora Amour, and Océane Aqua-Black.

Russ Marin of Xtra Magazine has described Suki Doll as "one of very few drag performers of Asian descent working regularly" in Quebec. She has also performed in Toronto's Queens of Dim Sum event, which highlights Asian and Pacific Islander drag artists.

Following her run on season 2 she has continued working as a designer having created outfits worn by Icesis Couture and by Brooke Lynn Hytes on later seasons of Canada's Drag Race. She has furthermore created looks for Nicky Doll (Drag Race France), Rita Baga (Drag Race Belgique), Miss Fiercalicious (Canada's Drag Race: Canada vs. the World) and Pythia (RuPaul's Drag Race Global All Stars).

In 2025, Suki was announced to compete on the inaugural season of Drag Race Philippines: Slaysian Royale, ending her run as Miss Congee-niality (Congeniality) and one of the Top 4 finalists with Arizona Brandy.

== Personal life ==
Pham is from Montreal. She is of Chinese, Cambodian and Vietnamese descent. Her main fashion inspirations are Azzedine Alaïa and Guo Pei.

== Filmography ==
- Canada's Drag Race
- Drag Race Philippines: Slaysian Royale
