= Jay Light =

Jay Light may refer to:

- Jay Light (musician), an oboist, author, and professor of music at Drake University
- Jay O. Light, a professor of finance and the dean of Harvard Business School from 2005 to 2010.
