= Beth (drag queen) =

Canadian drag performer

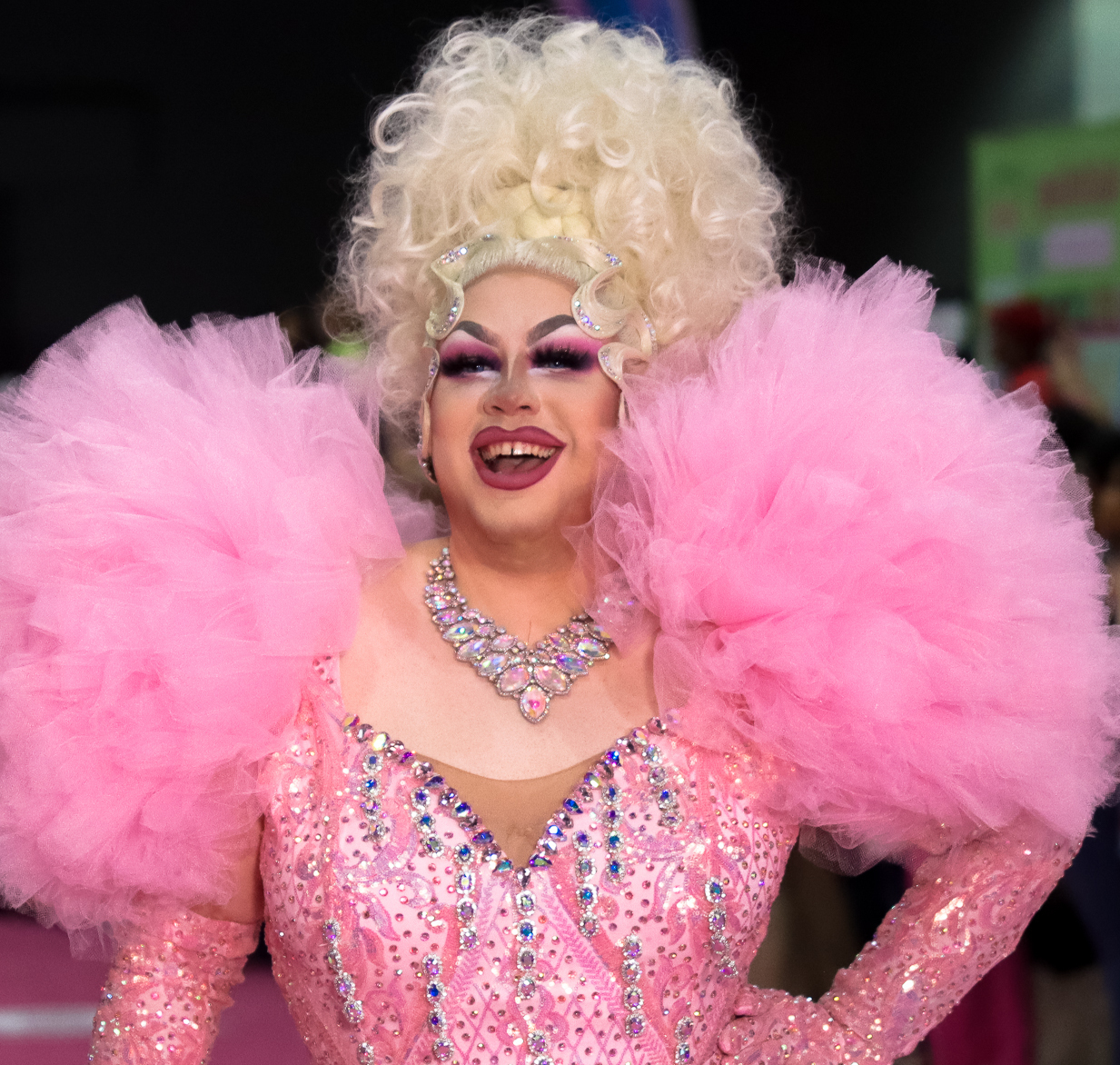
- Beth at RuPaul's DragCon LA, 2023
- Born: Rolland Bissonette; January 14, 1997 (age 29); Nelson, British Columbia, Canada
- Occupation: Drag queen
- Television: Canada's Drag Race (season 2)
- Website: allthatbeth.com

Beth is the stage name of Rolland Bissonette (born January 14, 1997), an Indigenous Canadian (Métis) and two-spirit drag performer who competed on season 2 of Canada's Drag Race.

== Career ==
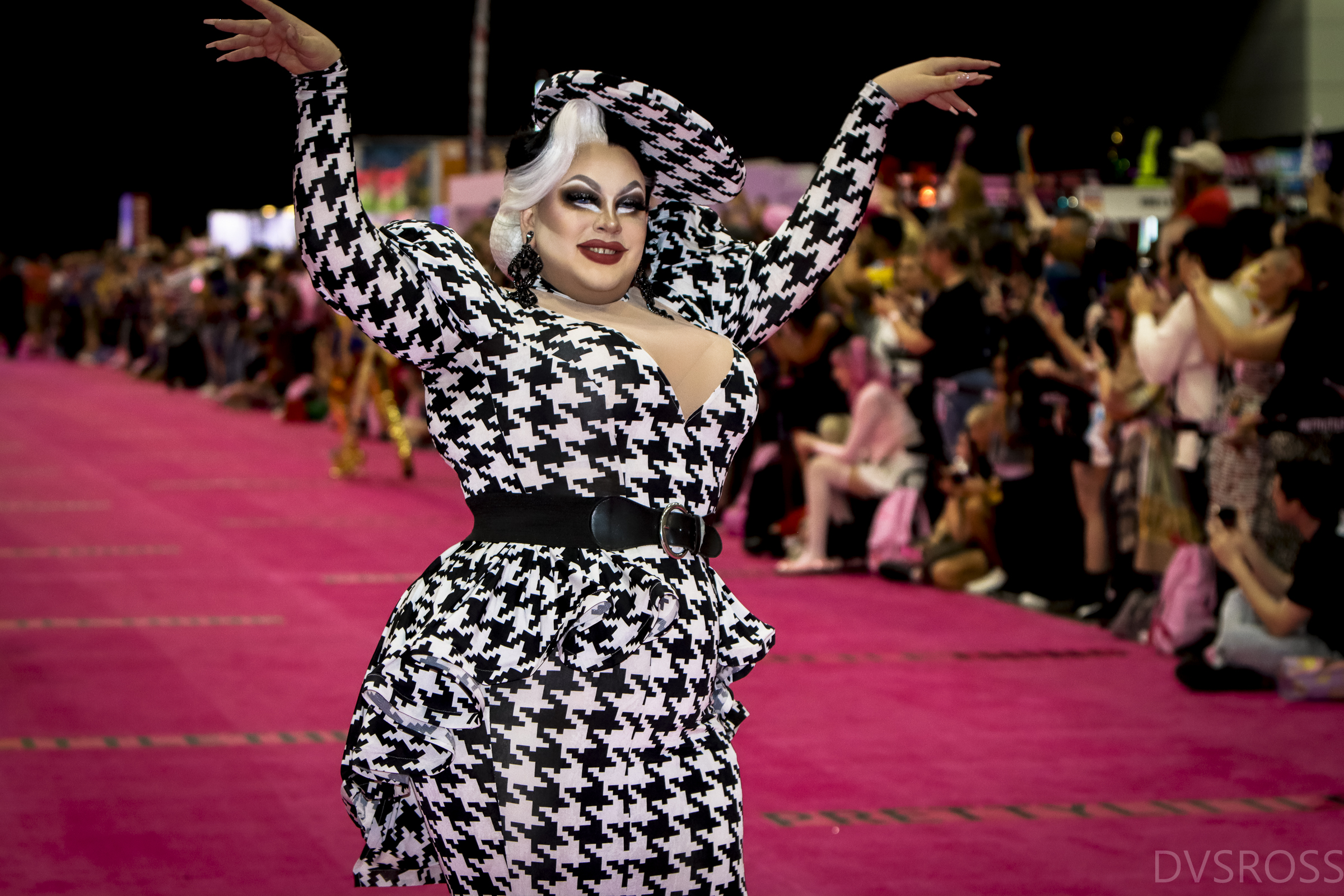
Beth at RuPaul's DragCon LA in 2022

Beth competed on season 2 of Canada's Drag Race. She was the first contestant eliminated, after losing a lip sync against to "Maneater" by Nelly Furtado. Michael Cook of Instinct wrote, "While her time on Season 2 ... might have been brief, the impression that Beth left on the competition and her fellow competitors was definitely memorable. With a passion for indigenous two-spirit people and a fresh post-pandemic perspective, Beth's post-Canada's Drag Race career is poised for greatness."

== Personal life ==
Beth is originally from Nelson and lives in Vancouver. She has three brothers, including a twin. She uses the pronouns she/her in drag and he/she/they out of drag.

== Filmography ==
=== Television ===
- Canada's Drag Race

=== Web series ===
- Bring Back My Girls (2022)
