= Stephanie Prince =

Drag performer

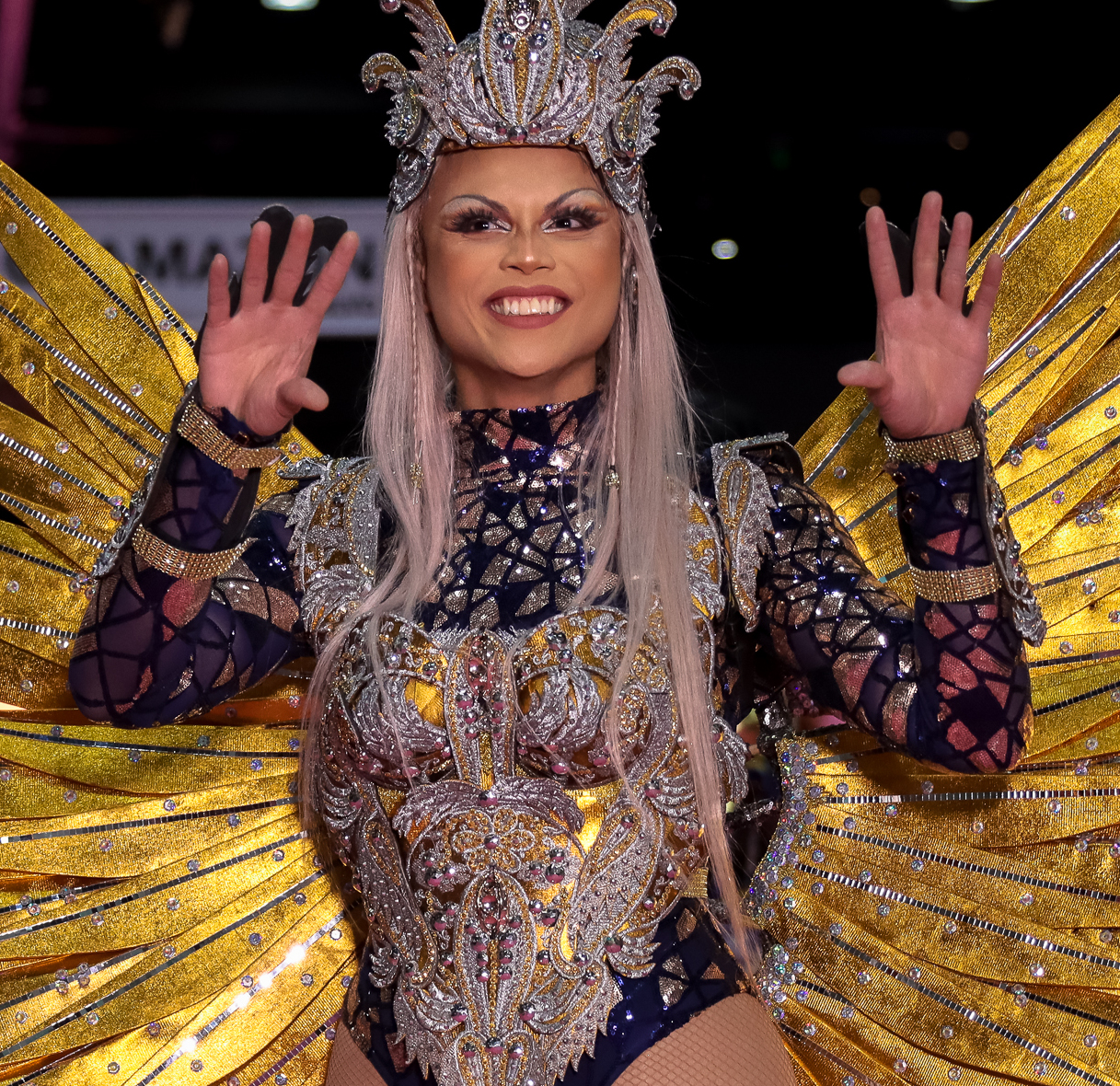
- Stephanie Prince at RuPaul's DragCon LA, 2023
- Born: Stephen Pasay; November 4, 1997 (age 29); Manila, NCR, Philippines
- Occupation: Drag performer
- Known for: Canada's Drag Race (season 2); Canada's Drag Race: Canada vs. the World (season 1)
- Website: stephaniesbutt.com

Stephen Pasay (born November 4, 1997), better known by the stage name Stephanie Prince, is a Filipino-Canadian drag performer most known for competing on the second season of Canada's Drag Race and the first season of its spin-off Canada's Drag Race: Canada vs. the World. Born in the Philippines, she resides in Calgary, Alberta.

== Career ==
Stephanie Prince competed on the second season of Canada's Drag Race. Josiah Antonio, ABS-CBN News said of her time on the show: "Stephanie Prince gave a remarkable showing on the runaway with her Jollibee-inspired entrance look. She was also praised during the design challenge with her high fashion dress made of posters."

Stephanie Prince returned to compete on the spin-off Canada's Drag Race: Canada vs. the World in November 2022. She was placed in the bottom two alongside fellow Canada's Drag Race Season 2 contestant Kendall Gender in the first episode following a girl group challenge, however she was saved by Vanity Milan, who represented the British version of the franchise, who eliminated Kendall Gender. The following episode, Stephanie Prince portrayed Cardi B during the Snatch Game challenge, which landed her in the bottom two for the second consecutive week, this time alongside Anita Wigl'it, who represented the Australian and New Zealand version of the franchise. Icesis Couture, who won the second season of Canada's Drag Race, decided to eliminate Stephanie Prince during this episode.

== Filmography ==
=== Television ===
Year	Title	Role	Notes
2021	Canada's Drag Race (Season 2)	Herself	Contestant (10th place)
2022	Canada's Drag Race: Canada vs. the World (Season 1)	Herself	Contestant (8th place)

- Bring Back My Girls (2024)

== Discography ==
=== As featured artist ===
Title	Year
"Bonjour, Hi (Maple She'rups Version)" (The Cast of Canada's Drag Race: Canada vs. the World (Note: The queens on this track from the cast include Icesis Couture, Kendall Gender, and Stephanie Prince.))	2022
