= Kapri (singer) =

Canadian singer

KAPRI is a Canadian pop and dance music singer from Edmonton, Alberta, whose single "Deeper" was a Juno Award nominee for Dance Recording of the Year at the Juno Awards of 2018.

In 2021 her cover of Alexis Jordan's 2010 single "Happiness" was used as a lip sync number in a second season episode of Canada's Drag Race, although the selection faced some discussion among the show's viewers as KAPRI's recording was unlocatable on any music store or streaming platform. The situation led to unconfirmed speculation that the show had to commission a new cover of the song after using Jordan's original recording during production and then running into a copyright clearance issue.

KAPRI was born in Edmonton and raised by a single mother from Trinidad and Tobago. She attended Victoria School of the Arts before moving to Ottawa to attend Carleton University. After graduation, she moved to Toronto.
