= Boman Martinez-Reid =

Canadian video creator

Boman Martinez-Reid, also known as Bomanizer, is a Canadian creator of TikTok comedy videos. His videos parody reality television by featuring his own family and friends getting into overly dramatized fights and feuds about small, everyday matters.

Martinez-Reid, the son of a Jamaican Canadian father and a Spanish Canadian mother, grew up in Mississauga, Ontario. and launched his TikTok account in 2019 while studying radio and television arts at Ryerson University. He broke through to mass popularity on the platform in 2020.

In 2021, he appeared in a second season episode of Canada's Drag Race as a celebrity contestant in the Snatch Game, and did work with The Gag, Comedy Central's internet-based platform for emerging LGBTQ comedians. In the same year, he was named as an Icon in TikTok's inaugural Discover List of top content creators on the platform, and was first runner-up for Best Local Comedy TikTok in Now's annual Best of Toronto reader poll.

In 2023, Crave announced production on Made for TV, a mockumentary series in which Martinez-Reid will play a version of himself trying out various television occupations as he tries to "find his genre" for a television series. The series premiered July 12, 2024.

He is out as gay.
