= Kimora Amour =

Canadian drag queen

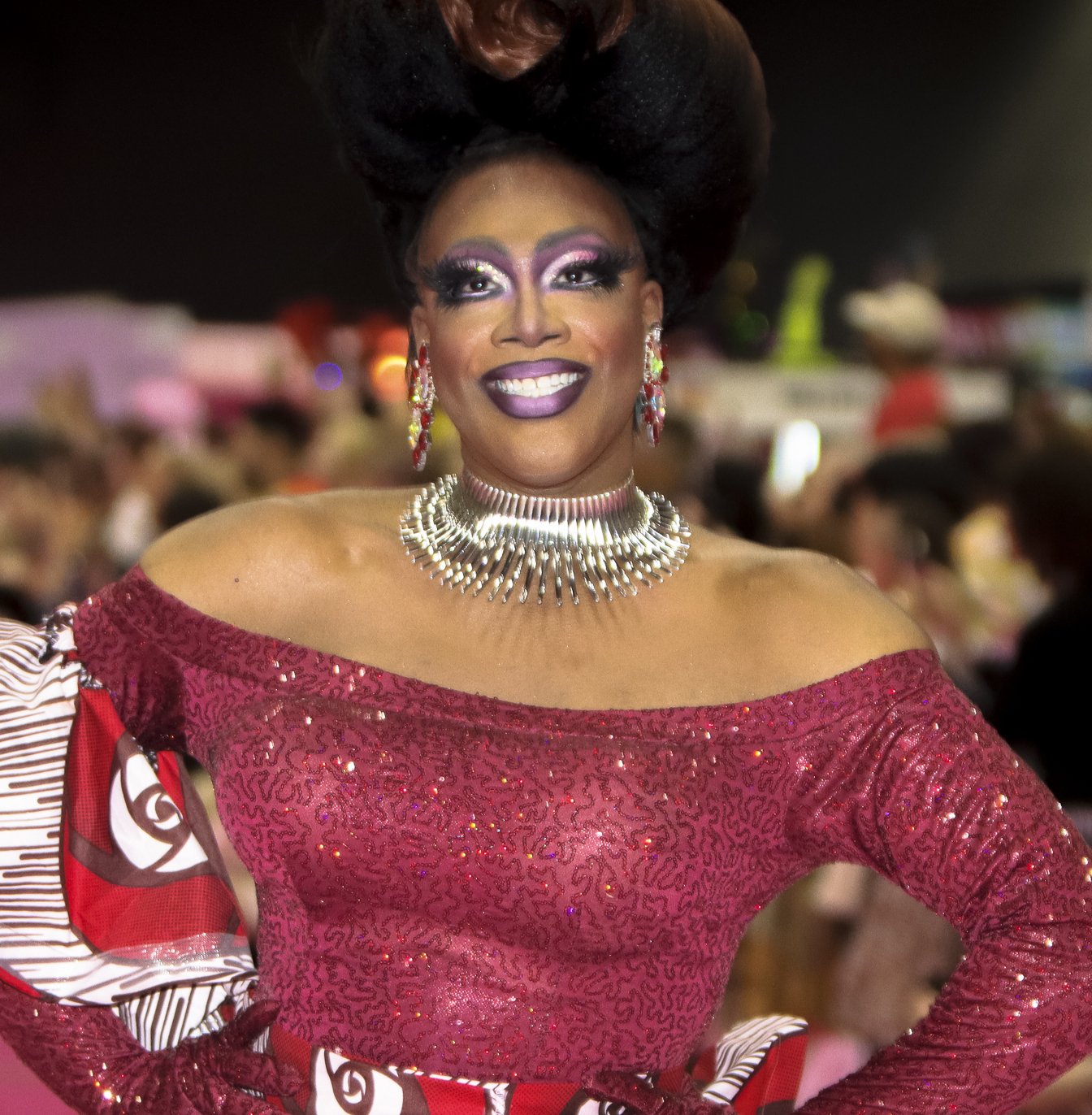
- Kimora Amour at RuPaul's DragCon LA, 2022
- Born: Justin Baird
- Occupation: Drag queen

Justin Baird, also known under the stage name Kimora Amour, is a Canadian drag queen, nurse, costume designer, and television personality best known as a competitor in the second season of Canada's Drag Race, and the ninth season of The Amazing Race Canada.

== Background ==
Justin Baird, of Guyanese descent, is father to a son, and lives in the Scarborough district of Toronto, Ontario. He works as a nurse in a pain management clinic, and has been a costume designer for Caribbean Carnival events such as Caribana.

He has been a close friend of fellow Canada's Drag Race contestant Jermaine Aranha, better known as Anastarzia Anaquway, ever since they first met at a ball. Kimora Amour has competed in various drag pageants, winning titles such as Ms. Opulence and Miss Trillium.

== Career ==
=== Kimora Amour ===
In 2021, Baird was a contestant on the Canada's Drag Race season 2 under the stage name Kimora Amour. On the show, Kimora Amour received special praise for a look she wore during the "Sinner's Ball" episode; given the runway prompt "Ugly as Sin", she chose to portray the ugly horrors of slavery by dressing as an enslaved woman, who eventually breaks her chains and runs toward freedom. For the first time in the history of the entire RuPaul's Drag Race franchise, the runway was presented with no comedic interjections from the judging panel, and was framed by brief fades to black upon both her entrance to and exit from the stage. The look was designed by Baird and Aranha.

After a poor showing in the "Roast of Brooke Lynn Hytes" episode, she was eliminated from the competition after giving a bizarre Lip Sync for Your Life performance; disliking the song and feeling checked out of the competition, she spent most of the lip sync stalking and hovering over opponent Gia Metric like an "annoying bird". She later attributed her poor performance in the roast episode to the lingering emotional intensity of having done the slavery runway the previous week, which left her struggling to perform at her best in either the main challenge or the lip sync.

In 2022, Kimora Amour was a judge on the CBX: Canadian Ballroom Extravaganza competition web series. In the same year, she raised allegations of racially insensitive behaviour among several Drag Race queens on Twitter, although the most widely publicized allegation was that first season CDR competitor and Drag Race Belgique host Rita Baga had once done a blackface number impersonating actress and singer Amber Riley.

In 2023, Kimora Amour was one of the participants, alongside fellow CDR alumni Icesis Couture and Suki Doll, in Courage Across Canada, a speaking tour in which the CDR queens spoke to high school students about bullying and homophobia.

=== The Amazing Race Canada ===
Justin Baird and his friend Jermaine Aranha competed as a team on the ninth season of The Amazing Race Canada. The team was eliminated in Saguenay, Quebec, becoming the sixth team to be eliminated in the season. The duo wanted to serve as an inspiration for other LGBTQ people.

== Filmography ==
=== Television ===
Television
Year	Title	Role	Notes
2021	Canada's Drag Race	Himself	Contestant; season 2
2023	The Amazing Race Canada	Himself	Contestant; season 9

=== Web series ===
- Bring Back My Girls (2022)
