= Canada's Drag Race season 2 =

2021 season of Canada's Drag Race

Canada's Drag Race
- Season 2
- Promotional poster for season two
- Hosted by: Brooke Lynn Hytes
- Judges: Brooke Lynn Hytes; Brad Goreski; Amanda Brugel; Traci Melchor
- No. of contestants: 12
- Winner: Icesis Couture
- Runners-up: Kendall Gender; Pythia
- Miss Congeniality: Suki Doll
- No. of episodes: 10

Release
- Original network: Crave
- Original release: October 14 – December 16, 2021

Season chronology
- ← Previous; Season 1 Next → Season 3

The second season of Canada's Drag Race premiered on October 14, and concluded on December 16, 2021. The season aired on Crave in Canada and WOW Presents Plus internationally.

Casting for the second season started early 2021 and the twelve contestants were announced on September 14, 2021. This season, Brad Goreski replaced Jeffrey Bowyer-Chapman as a judge, while Amanda Brugel and Traci Melchor replaced Stacey McKenzie.

The winner of the second season of Canada's Drag Race was Icesis Couture, with Kendall Gender and Pythia as runners-up.

== Contestants ==
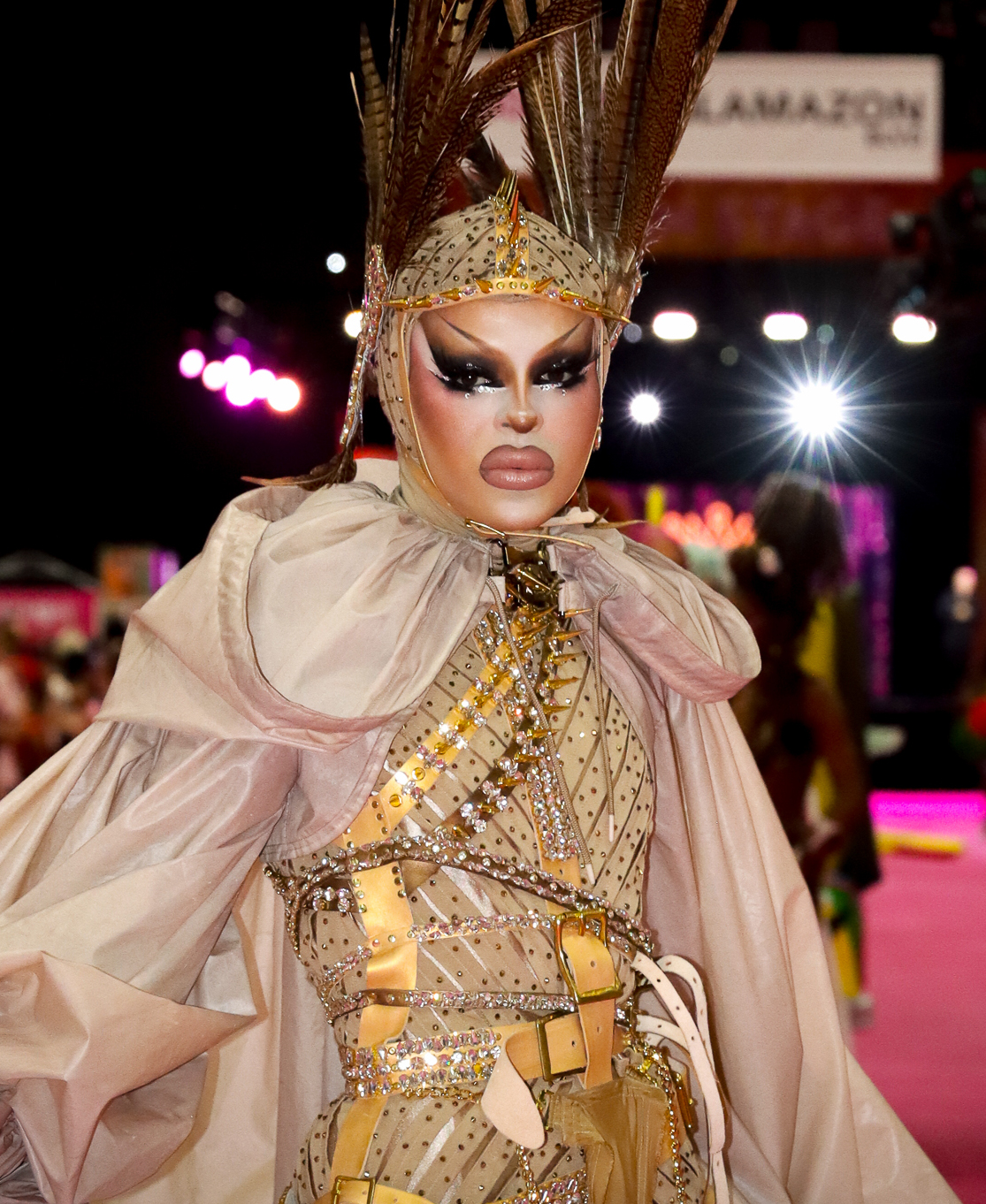
The winner, Icesis Couture.

Canada's Drag Race season 2 contestants and their backgrounds (Note: All ages, names, with hometowns, and outcome are stated at time of filming.)
Contestant	Age	Hometown	Outcome
Icesis Couture	34	Ottawa, Ontario	Winner
Kendall Gender	30	Vancouver, British Columbia	Runners-up
Pythia	26	Montreal, Quebec	Runners-up
Gia Metric	29	Vancouver, British Columbia	4th place
Adriana (Note: Adriana The Bombshell, also known as Adriana Schatzim, is referred to as Adriana on the show.)	29	Quebec City, Quebec	5th place
Kimora Amour	34	Scarborough, Ontario	6th place
Synthia Kiss	29	Vancouver, British Columbia	7th place
Eve 6000	29	Toronto, Ontario	8th place
Suki Doll	27	Montreal, Quebec	9th place (Note: Suki Doll was voted Miss Congeniality.)
Stephanie Prince	23	Calgary, Alberta	10th place
Océane Aqua-Black	35	Quebec City, Quebec	11th place
Beth	24	Vancouver, British Columbia	12th place

Footnotes

== Contestant progress ==
Legend:

Icesis Couture won Canada's Drag Race season 2.
Kendall Gender and Pythia were the runners-up.
Suki Doll was voted Miss Congeniality (Miss C) by fellow contestants.
WIN indicates that the contestant won the challenge.
STAY indicates that the contestant won a lip sync to advance to the finale.
SAFE indicates that the contestant was declared safe by the judges.
BTM (Bottom) indicates that the contestant was up for elimination.
ELIM (Eliminated) indicates that the contestant was eliminated.
Guest indicates that the contestant returned as a guest.

Contestants progress with placements in each episode
Contestant	Episode									
Contestant	1	2	3	4	5	6	7	8	9	10
Icesis Couture	WIN	BTM	SAFE	SAFE	SAFE	WIN	SAFE	BTM	STAY	Winner
Kendall Gender	SAFE	SAFE	SAFE	SAFE	SAFE	BTM	WIN	SAFE	STAY	Runner-up
Pythia	SAFE	WIN	SAFE	SAFE	SAFE	SAFE	SAFE	WIN	STAY	Runner-up
Gia Metric	BTM	SAFE	SAFE	SAFE	WIN	SAFE	BTM	SAFE	ELIM	Guest
Adriana	SAFE	SAFE	WIN	SAFE	SAFE	SAFE	SAFE	ELIM	Guest	Guest
Kimora Amour	SAFE	SAFE	SAFE	SAFE	SAFE	SAFE	ELIM		Guest	Guest
Synthia Kiss	SAFE	SAFE	BTM	WIN	BTM	ELIM			Guest	Guest
Eve 6000	SAFE	SAFE	SAFE	BTM	ELIM				Guest	Guest
Suki Doll	SAFE	SAFE	SAFE	ELIM					Miss C	Guest
Stephanie Prince	SAFE	SAFE	ELIM						Guest	Guest
Océane Aqua-Black	SAFE	ELIM							Guest	Guest
Beth	ELIM								Guest	Guest

== Lip syncs ==
Legend:

The contestant was eliminated after their first time in the bottom.
The contestant was eliminated after their second time in the bottom.
The contestant was eliminated after their third time in the bottom.
The contestant won the lip sync to advance to the finale.
The contestant won the Lip Sync for the Crown and was declared the winner of the season.

Episode	Contestants			Song	Eliminated
1	Beth	vs.	Gia Metric	"Maneater" (Nelly Furtado)	Beth
2	Icesis Couture	vs.	Océane Aqua-Black	"Stupid Shit" (Girlicious)	Océane Aqua-Black
3	Stephanie Prince	vs.	Synthia Kiss	"Ghost" (Fefe Dobson)	Stephanie Prince
4	Eve 6000	vs.	Suki Doll	"Happiness" (KAPRI)	Suki Doll
5	Eve 6000	vs.	Synthia Kiss	"I Love Myself Today" (Bif Naked)	Eve 6000
6	Kendall Gender	vs.	Synthia Kiss	"Heaven" (DJ Sammy, Yanou ft. Do)	Synthia Kiss
7	Gia Metric	vs.	Kimora Amour	"Get Down" (B4-4)	Kimora Amour
8	Adriana	vs.	Icesis Couture	"Everybody Say Love" (Mitsou)	Adriana
Episode	Contestants			Song	Winner
9	Gia Metric	vs.	Kendall Gender	"Main Event" (RuPaul)	Kendall Gender
9	Icesis Couture	vs.	Pythia	"Born Naked" (RuPaul ft. Clairy Browne)	Icesis Couture
9	Contestants			Song	Eliminated
9	Gia Metric	vs.	Pythia	"Call Me Mother" (RuPaul)	Gia Metric
Episode	Final contestants			Song	Winner
10	Icesis Couture vs. Kendall Gender vs. Pythia			"It's All Coming Back to Me Now" (Céline Dion)	Icesis Couture

== Guest judges ==
In June 2021, new judges for the second season were announced. Brad Goreski, Amanda Brugel, and Traci Melchor replace Stacey McKenzie and Jeffrey Bowyer-Chapman behind the judging table. The season also included several guest judges. Listed in chronological order:

- Caitlin Cronenberg, photographer
- Hollywood Jade, dancer and choreographer
- Fefe Dobson, singer
- Connor Jessup, actor
- Bif Naked, singer
- Gigi Gorgeous, YouTuber and model
- Emma Hunter, actress and comedian
- Mitsou, singer and actress

=== Special guests ===
Episode 2

- Thom Allison, actor

Episode 3

- Jimbo, contestant from Canada's Drag Race Season 1

Episode 4

- Boman "Bomanizer" Martinez-Reid, TikToker and influencer

Episode 10

- Priyanka, winner of Canada's Drag Race Season 1
- Irvin Washington, assistant choreographer

== Episodes ==
No. overall	No. in season	Title	Original release date
11	1	"Lost and Fierce"	October 14, 2021
Twelve new queens enter the workroom. For the first mini-challenge, the queens do a photoshoot while jumping off a platform. Suki Doll wins the mini-challenge. For the main challenge, the queens create a look made from coat check items. On the runway, Icesis Couture, Stephanie Prince and Suki Doll receive positive critiques, with Icesis Couture winning the challenge. Beth, Eve 6000 and Gia Metric receive negative critiques, with Eve 6000 being safe. Beth and Gia Metric lip-sync to "Maneater" by Nelly Furtado. Gia Metric wins the lip-sync, and Beth is the first queen to sashay away.: Guest Judge: Caitlin Cronenberg; Alternating Judge: Amanda Brugel; Mini-Challenge: Photoshoot while jumping off a platform; Mini-Challenge Winner: Suki Doll; Mini-Challenge Prize: A shoe collection from House of Hayla and a $2,500 cash tip; Main Challenge: Create a look made from coat check items; Challenge Winner: Icesis Couture; Challenge Prize: A home entertainment package valued at $5,000 from The Source; Bottom Two: Beth and Gia Metric; Lip-Sync Song: "Maneater" by Nelly Furtado; Eliminated: Beth; Farewell Message: "BYE!"
12	2	"Under the Big Top"	October 21, 2021
For this weeks mini-challenge, the queens compete in the Queen of My Neighborhood Pageant. Océane Aqua-Black wins the mini-challenge. For this week's main challenge, the queens perform in Under the Big Top, Live.: Adriana plays Bang; Eve 6000 plays Revealiana; Gia Metric plays Himbo; Icesis Couture plays Lace; Kendall Gender plays Ring Mistress; Kimora Amour plays Bianca; Océane Aqua-Black plays Bong; Pythia plays Hennywise; Stephanie Prince plays Leather; Suki Doll plays Bing; Synthia Kiss plays Corsette; On the runway, category is Circus Bezerkus. Gia Metric, Kendall Gender and Pythia receive positive critiques, with Pythia winning the challenge. Eve 6000, Icesis Couture, Océane Aqua-Black and Suki Doll receive negative critiques, with Eve 6000 and Suki Doll being safe. Icesis Couture and Océane Aqua-Black lip-sync to "Stupid Shit" by Girlicious. Icesis Couture wins the lip-sync, and Océane Aqua-Black sashays away.: Guest Judge: Hollywood Jade; Alternating Judge: Traci Melchor; Mini-Challenge: Queen of My Neighborhood Pageant; Mini-Challenge Winner: Océane Aqua-Black; Mini-Challenge Prize: A $1,000 gift card to DoorDash and a $5,000 cash tip to donate to a charity of their choice; Main Challenge: Under the Big Top, Live; Runway Theme: Circus Bezerkus; Challenge Winner: Pythia; Challenge Prize: $5,000 gift certificate from Peoples Jewellers; Bottom Two: Icesis Couture and Océane Aqua-Black; Lip-Sync Song: "Stupid Shit" by Girlicious; Eliminated: Océane Aqua-Black; Farewell Message: "Thanks for this amazing time with you girls Love you Icesis. Snatch that crown I hope to see you all succeed. Eve you're sexy, give me your number. Stephanie be careful how you come across when you talk to people Love you though x Gia omg that bulge!!!!!"
13	3	"Screech"	October 28, 2021
For this week's main challenge, the queens overact in the slasher film parody "Screech".: Adriana plays Blood 'N' Goreski; Eve 6000 plays Nara Hater; Gia Metric plays Blue Scarymore; Icesis Couture plays Jocklyn Straps; Kendall Gender plays Hookin' Hytes; Kimora Amour plays Frontelle Lobe; Pythia plays Fairuzah Chalk; Stephanie Prince plays Clitney Lezcoff; Suki Doll plays Emmy Dumpah; Synthia Kiss plays A-Martha; On the runway, category is Good Girl Gone Bad. Adriana, Eve 6000 and Gia Metric receive positive critiques, with Adriana winning the challenge. Kendall Gender, Stephanie Prince and Synthia Kiss receive negative critiques, with Kendall Gender being safe. Stephanie Prince and Synthia Kiss lip-sync to "Ghost" by Fefe Dobson. Synthia Kiss wins the lip-sync, and Stephanie Prince sashays away.: Guest Judge: Fefe Dobson; Alternating Judge: Amanda Brugel; Main Challenge: Overact in the slasher film parody "Screech"; Runway Theme: Good Girl Gone Bad; Challenge Winner: Adriana; Challenge Prize: A $5,000 gift certificate courtesy of Fabricland; Bottom Two: Stephanie Prince and Synthia Kiss; Lip-Sync Song: "Ghost" by Fefe Dobson; Eliminated: Stephanie Prince; Farewell Message: "Just letting you guys know that I love y'all and that you should be so proud of yourself. Back to being a bitch. I hate y'all. JK, I'm so horny. -Steph"
14	4	"Snatch Game"	November 4, 2021
For this week's mini-challenge, the queens read each other to filth. Icesis Couture wins the mini-challenge. For the main challenge, the queens play the Snatch Game. Brad Goreski and Boman "Bomanizer" Martinez-Reid star as the celebrity contestants. The cast consisted of: Adriana as Sofía Vergara; Eve 6000 as Bernie Sanders; Gia Metric as Jim Carrey; Icesis Couture as La Veneno; Kendall Gender as Kris Jenner; Kimora Amour as Leslie Jones; Pythia as Grimes; Suki Doll as Yoko Ono; Synthia Kiss as Rachel Zoe; On the runway, category is Made in Canada. Kimora Amour, Pythia and Synthia Kiss receive positive critiques, with Synthia Kiss winning the challenge. Adriana, Eve 6000 and Suki Doll receive negative critiques, with Adriana being safe. Eve 6000 and Suki Doll lip-sync to "Happiness" by KAPRI. Eve 6000 wins the lip-sync, and Suki Doll sashays away.: Guest Judge: Connor Jessup; Alternating Judge: Traci Melchor; Mini-Challenge: Reading is Fundamental; Mini-Challenge Winner: Icesis Couture; Mini-Challenge Prize: A $2,000 cash tip courtesy of Tan on the Run; Main Challenge: Snatch Game; Runway Theme: Made in Canada; Challenge Winner: Synthia Kiss; Challenge Prize: A $5,000 cash tip courtesy of Made / Nous; Bottom Two: Eve 6000 and Suki Doll; Lip-Sync Song: "Happiness" by KAPRI; Eliminated: Suki Doll; Farewell Message: "My Dolls, No matter where you come from... Be proud, be loud. Take life by its throat. Mwahhh Suki XOX"
15	5	"Bye Flop"	November 11, 2021
For this week's mini-challenge, the queens pair up to give a lesson on safe sex. Gia Metric and Synthia Kiss win the mini-challenge. For the main challenge, the queens write, record, and perform verses to "Bye Flop".: Team The Dosey Hoes - Eve 6000, Kendall Gender, Kimora Amour and Synthia Kiss; Team The Giddy Girls - Adriana, Gia Metric, Icesis Couture and Pythia; On the runway, category is Monochromatica: Drag Pop Princess. Team "The Giddy Girls" is the winning team, with Gia Metric winning the challenge. Team "The Dosey Hoes" is the losing team. Eve 6000, Kendall Gender and Synthia Kiss receive negative critiques, with Kendall Gender being safe. Eve 6000 and Synthia Kiss lip-sync to "I Love Myself Today" by Bif Naked. Synthia Kiss wins the lip-sync and Eve 6000 sashays away.: Guest Judge: Bif Naked; Alternating Judge: Traci Melchor; Mini-Challenge: In pairs, give a lesson on safe sex; Mini-Challenge Winners: Gia Metric and Synthia Kiss; Mini-Challenge Prize: A $1,000 cash tip and $500 worth of products from Trojan; Main Challenge: Write, record, and perform verses to "Bye Flop"; Runway Theme: Monochromatica: Drag Pop Princess; Challenge Winner: Gia Metric; Challenge Prize: A $5,000 cash tip courtesy of JJ Malibu; Bottom Two: Eve 6000 and Synthia Kiss; Lip-Sync Song: "I Love Myself Today" by Bif Naked; Eliminated: Eve 6000; Farewell Message: "I love you all. This sisterhood is worth more than $100k. PS, you're all blocked."
16	6	"The Sinner's Ball"	November 19, 2021
For this week's mini-challenge, the queens get into quick drag to paint an evocative "twerk of art" resembling their inner saboteur. Icesis Couture wins the mini-challenge. For the main challenge, the queens create three looks for The Sinner's Ball: Sex, Drugs and Rock 'n' Roll, Ugly as Sin and Seven Deadly Sins: Adriana - Lust; Gia Metric - Sloth; Icesis Couture - Wrath; Kendall Gender - Pride; Kimora Amour - Envy; Pythia - Gluttony; Synthia Kiss - Greed; On the runway, Gia Metric, Icesis Couture, Kimora Amour and Pythia receive positive critiques, with Icesis Couture winning the challenge. Adriana, Kendall Gender and Synthia Kiss receive negative critiques, with Adriana being safe. Kendall Gender and Synthia Kiss lip-sync to "Heaven" by DJ Sammy, Yanou ft. Do. Kendall Gender wins the lip-sync, and Synthia Kiss sashays away.: Guest Judge: Gigi Gorgeous; Alternating Judge: Amanda Brugel; Mini-Challenge: Get into quick drag and paint an evocative "twerk of art" resembling their inner saboteur; Mini-Challenge Winner: Icesis Couture; Mini-Challenge Prize: A $2,000 gift card courtesy of Indochino; Main Challenge: The Sinner's Ball; Runway Themes: Sex, Drugs and Rock 'n' Roll, Ugly as Sin and Seven Deadly Sins; Challenge Winner: Icesis Couture; Challenge Prize: A $5,000 cash tip courtesy of Palm Holdings; Bottom Two: Kendall Gender and Synthia Kiss; Lip-Sync Song: "Heaven" by DJ Sammy, Yanou ft. Do; Eliminated: Synthia Kiss; Farewell Message: "Kiss it! Love u all sooo much!"
17	7	"The Roast of Brooke Lynn Hytes"	November 26, 2021
For this week's mini-challenge, the queens sound off on the highs and lows of this season's fashion on Brad Goreski's new show "Fashion Puh-Leeze". Kendall Gender wins the mini-challenge. For the main challenge, the queens perform a roast of Brooke Lynn Hytes. On the runway, category is Dungeons and Drag Queens. Icesis Couture and Kendall Gender receive positive critiques, with Kendall Gender winning the challenge. Adriana, Gia Metric, Kimora Amour and Pythia receive negative critiques, with Adriana and Pythia being safe. Gia Metric and Kimora Amour lip-sync to "Get Down” by B4-4. Gia Metric wins the lip-sync, and Kimora Amour sashays away.: Guest Judge: Emma Hunter; Alternating Judge: Amanda Brugel; Mini-Challenge: Sound off on the highs and lows of this season's fashion on Brad Goreski's new show "Fashion Puh-Leeze"; Mini-Challenge Winner: Kendall Gender; Mini-Challenge Prize: A $2,500 cash tip courtesy of The Men's Room; Main Challenge: Perform a roast of Brooke Lynn Hytes; Runway Theme: Dungeons and Drag Queens; Challenge Winner: Kendall Gender; Challenge Prize: A $2,500 gift certificate and a $5,000 cash tip courtesy of Vitaly; Bottom Two: Gia Metric and Kimora Amour; Lip-Sync Song: "Get Down” by B4-4; Eliminated: Kimora Amour; Farewell Message: "Mutha Out!!!"
18	8	"Prom"	December 3, 2021
For this week's main challenge, the queens makeover LGBTQ+ teenagers. On the runway, category is Cool Mom and Prom Queen. Gia Metric and Pythia receive positive critiques, with Pythia winning the challenge. Adriana, Icesis Couture and Kendall Gender receive negative critiques, with Kendall Gender being safe. Adriana and Icesis Couture lip-sync to "Everybody Say Love” by Mitsou. Icesis Couture wins the lip-sync, and Adriana sashays away.: Guest Judge: Mitsou; Alternating Judge: Traci Melchor; Main Challenge: Makeover LGBTQ+ teenagers; Runway Theme: Cool Mom and Prom Queen; Challenge Winner: Pythia; Challenge Prize: A $2,500 beauty gift card and $5,000 donated to It Gets Better Canada courtesy of Shoppers Drug Mart; Bottom Two: Adriana and Icesis Couture; Lip-Sync Song: "Everybody Say Love” by Mitsou; Eliminated: Adriana; Farewell Message: "Bye, Chao Putas!"
19	9	"The Reunion"	December 9, 2021
The queens all return for the reunion. Suki Doll is announced as this season's Miss Congeniality. Brad Goreski then reveals that the top 4 queens will participate in a lip-sync smackdown to guarantee a spot in the top 3. In the first round, Kendall Gender and Gia Metric lip-sync to "Main Event" by RuPaul. Kendall Gender wins the lip-sync. In the second round, Icesis Couture and Pythia lip-sync to "Born Naked" by RuPaul. Icesis Couture wins the lip-sync. In the final round, Gia Metric and Pythia lip-sync to "Call Me Mother" by RuPaul. Pythia wins the lip-sync, and Gia Metric sashays away.: Miss Congeniality: Suki Doll; Alternating Judges: Traci Melchor and Amanda Brugel; Main Challenge: Perform a Lip-Sync Smackdown for a spot in the top 3; Lip-Sync Smackdown #1: Kendall Gender vs. Gia Metric; Lip-Sync Song: "Main Event" by RuPaul; Winner: Kendall Gender; Lip-Sync Smackdown #2: Icesis Couture vs. Pythia; Lip-Sync Song: "Born Naked" by RuPaul; Winner: Icesis Couture; Lip-Sync Smackdown #3: Gia Metric vs. Pythia; Lip-Sync Song: "Call Me Mother" by RuPaul; Winner: Pythia; Eliminated: Gia Metric; Farewell Message: "I left my heart and soul on that stage! I love you all!"
20	10	"Queen of the North"	December 16, 2021
For the final challenge of the season, the queens write, record, and perform their own verses to Brooke Lynn Hytes' song "Queen of the North". On the runway, category is Coronation Eleganza. The eliminated queens all return to the runway. The three finalists are told that they will be lip-syncing to "It's All Coming Back to Me Now" by Céline Dion. It is announced that Icesis Couture is the winner, leaving Kendall Gender and Pythia as the runners-up.: Alternating Judges: Traci Melchor and Amanda Brugel; Main Challenge: Write, record and perform their own verses to Brooke Lynn Hytes' song "Queen of the North"; Runway Theme: Coronation Eleganza; Miss Congeniality: Suki Doll; Lip Sync Song: "It's All Coming Back to Me Now" by Céline Dion; Runners-up: Kendall Gender and Pythia; Winner of Canada's Drag Race Season Two: Icesis Couture

== Awards ==
Award	Date of ceremony	Category	Nominees	Result	Ref.
Canadian Screen Awards	April 10, 2022	Best Reality/Competition Program or Series	Pam McNair, Betty Orr, Trevor Boris, Laura Michalshyshyn, Michael Kot, Fenton Bailey, Randy Barbato, Tom Campbell, RuPaul Charles, Justin Stockman, Jen Markowitz, Spencer Fritz	Won	
Canadian Screen Awards	April 10, 2022	Best Direction, Reality/Competition	Shelagh O'Brien — "Under the Big Top"	Won	
Canadian Screen Awards	April 10, 2022	Best Writing, Lifestyle or Reality/Competition	Brandon Ash-Mohammed — "Screech"	Won	
Canadian Screen Awards	April 10, 2022	Best Picture Editing, Reality/Competition	Lindsay Ragone — "Screech"	Nominated	
Canadian Screen Awards	April 10, 2022	Best Picture Editing, Reality/Competition	Baun Mah — "The Snatch Game"	Won	
Canadian Screen Awards	April 10, 2022	Best Picture Editing, Reality/Competition	Peter Topalovic — "Under the Big Top"	Nominated	
Canadian Screen Awards	April 10, 2022	Best Sound, Non-Fiction	John Diemer, Rob Taylor, Phil Nagy, Eric Leigh, Dane Kelly, Sarah Labadie — "Under the Big Top"	Nominated	
Canadian Screen Awards	April 10, 2022	Best Casting, Non-Fiction	Heather Muir	Won	
Canadian Screen Awards	April 10, 2022	Best Host or Presenter, Factual or Reality/Competition	Brooke Lynn Hytes, Traci Melchor, Amanda Brugel, Brad Goreski	Won	
