= Jay Light (musician) =

American oboist

Jay Light is an American oboist and author who was the principal oboist of the Philadelphia Lyric and Grand Opera Companies from 1962 to 1964 and the L'orchestre Symphonique de Quebec from 1964 to 1966. He also performed in numerous recitals and concerts through his career.

== Formative years ==
A native of Philadelphia, Pennsylvania, Light was a son of Israel Light. His brother, Herbert Light, was a violinist with the Philadelphia Orchestra.

Jay Light studied with John de Lancie, Charles M. Morris, and Norman Wells Jr., all of whom were associated with the Philadelphia Orchestra. Principal oboist of the Philadelphia Lyric and Grand Opera Companies from 1962 to 1964, he graduated from the Curtis Institute of Music in 1963. From 1964 to 1966, he was the principal oboist of the L'orchestre Symphonique de Quebec.

He then served in the United States Army as a military journalist and was an Armed Forces Network (now the American Forces Network) as a television news anchor from 1966 to 1969.

After completing his military service, he taught at the Interlochen Arts Academy (from 1969 to 1971) and earned his Master of Music degree at Michigan State University in 1972. Beginning in 1974, Light was principal oboist for the Des Moines Symphony. He was a member of the Drake University faculty from 1972 to 2002. During his career, he also performed at the Berkshire (Tanglewood) Festival, the Festival of Two Worlds (Festival dei Due Mondi) in Spoleto, Italy, and the Aspen Music Festival.

He retired in 2002 and lives in Fort Myers Beach, Florida.

== Author ==
- The Oboe Reed Book, copyright 1983.
- Essays for Oboists, copyright 1994.
