= Océane Aqua-Black =

Canadian drag performer

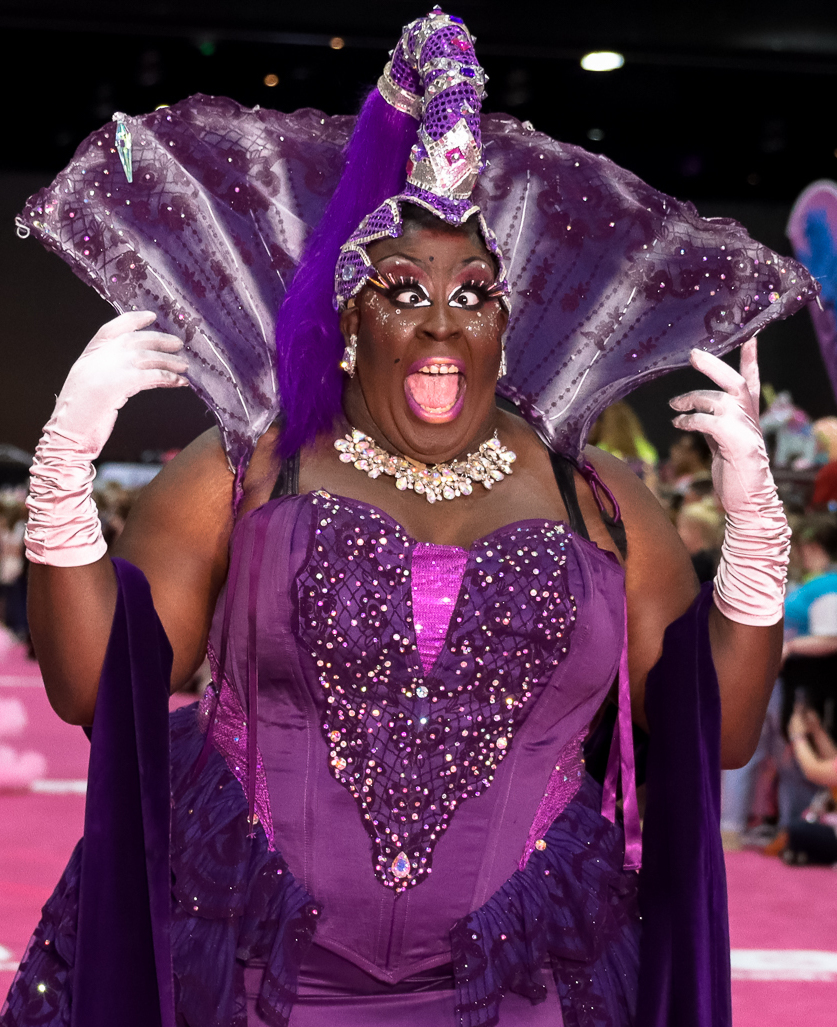
- Océane Aqua-Black at RuPaul's DragCon LA, 2023
- Born: Thierry Boily Simard; Quebec City, Quebec, Canada

Océane Aqua-Black is the stage name of Thierry Boily-Simard, a Canadian drag performer who competed on season 2 of Canada's Drag Race.

== Career ==
Océane Aqua-Black competed on season 2 of Canada's Drag Race. She was the second contestant eliminated, after placing in the bottom two based on her performance in the Rusical "Under the Big Top", then losing a lip sync against Icesis Couture to "Stupid Shit" by Girlicious. After the season finished airing, Océane Aqua-Black toured with her fellow contestants in a show hosted by Brooke Lynn Hytes.

== Personal life ==
Océane Aqua-Black is from Quebec City, and uses the pronouns she/her in drag and he/him out of drag.

== Discography ==
- Album Shame-Less

=== Television ===
- Canada's Drag Race

=== Web series ===
- Bring Back My Girls (2022)

== See also ==
- List of Black Canadians
