= Adriana (drag queen) =

Colombian-Canadian drag performer

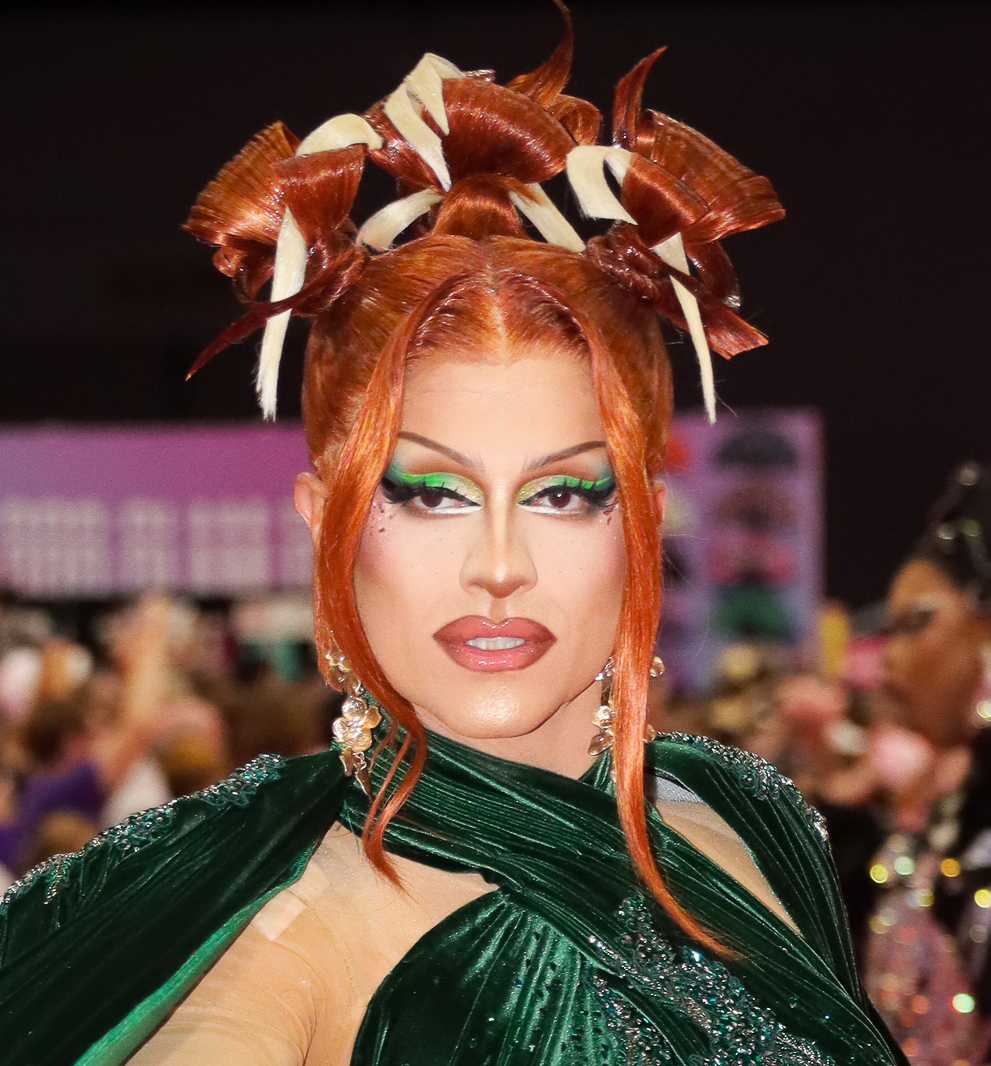
- Adriana at RuPaul's DragCon LA, 2024
- Born: Daniel Albornoz; Colombia
- Other name: Adriana The Bombshell (first named Adriana Shatzi)
- Occupation: Drag queen
- Television: Canada's Drag Race (season 2)
- Website: adrianathebombshell.com

Adriana The Bombshell, better known simply as Adriana, is the stage name of Daniel Albornoz, a Colombian-Canadian drag performer who competed on season 2 of Canada's Drag Race.

== Career ==
Adriana gained notoriety in Canada's drag and fetish scenes. She was named Quebec's Drag Artist of the Year three times.

Adriana competed on season 2 of Canada's Drag Race. She impersonated Sofía Vergara for the Snatch Game challenge. Adriana placed in the bottom two during the makeover challenge, and was eliminated from the competition after losing a lip sync against Icesis Couture.

Adriana is managed by Productions Midor, described as Quebec's first such agency for drag artists.

== Personal life ==
Adriana immigrated from Colombia to Canada as a teenager. She is based in Montreal (Quebec, Canada) . Her ex romantic partner was also her creative partner.

== Filmography ==
=== Television ===
- Canada's Drag Race (season 2)

=== Web series ===
- Bring Back My Girls (2022)
