= Pythia (drag queen) =

Greek-Canadian drag performer

- Born: Christos Darlasis; October 4, 1994 (age 31); Argos, Peloponnese, Greece
- Other name: Crystal Nebula
- Occupations: Drag performer; costume designer; makeup artist
- Television: Canada's Drag Race (season 2)
- Website: houseofpythia.com

Pythia is the stage name of Christos Darlasis (born October 4, 1994), a Greek-Canadian drag performer most known for competing on the second season of Canada's Drag Race and on the first seasons of RuPaul's Drag Race Global All Stars and Canada's Drag Race All Stars.

== Early life and education ==
Pythia was born Christos Darlasis and was raised in Argos, Greece, before moving to Montreal, Quebec at the age of 14. As a child, she hid her feminine traits in order to fit in with other children but found solace in comics and characters such as Cruella de Vil and Maleficent. Darlasis joined her school's gay–straight alliance in high school. She earned a certificate in set and costume design from the Regina School of Theatre in Regina, Saskatchewan. She first appeared in drag as Barbie for a costume party, although she had cosplayed as female characters such as Ariel from The Little Mermaid and celebrities such as Lady Gaga beforehand.

She is a Greek national and applied for Canadian citizenship in August 2020, and she obtained it in May 2022.

In the season finale of the second season of Canada's Drag Race, Pythia stated that they do not identify as either male or female, but identify somewhere on the non-binary spectrum.

== Career ==
Pythia is a Montreal-based drag performer who also works as a costume designer and makeup artist for film and theatre. She initially began performing in drag under the name Crystal Nebula, before renaming herself Pythia, for the mythological Oracle of Delphi, as a reference to her Greek heritage. Her drag family includes Fawn Darling and Denim, who appeared on the fourth season of Canada's Drag Race, as well as HercuSleaze, who appeared on the first season of Call Me Mother.

She was a finalist on the second season of Canada's Drag Race, reaching the Top 3 but ultimately losing the crown to Icesis Couture. She portrayed Grimes during the Snatch Game episode, and won the "Under the Big Top" Rusical and the makeover challenge. According to Anna Wichmann of the Greek Reporter, Pythia is "the first performer of Greek heritage to be featured on any of the show's multinational franchises".

She has indicated that her goals in drag revolve around visual and theatrical storytelling. During the season, she received praise for several runway looks, including a two-headed fortune-teller in the "Circus Berzerkus" runway, a centaur in the Dungeons and Drag Queens runway and a Greek goddess statue in the finale, which were hailed as some of the most striking and original drag looks ever seen across the entire franchise.

Pythia competed on the 2024 spin-off series RuPaul's Drag Race Global All Stars.

In December 2024, Pythia and Denim premiered Oraculum, a theatre show blending drag, puppetry and projection work, at Buddies in Bad Times in Toronto. In 2025, Pythia won the Toronto Theatre Critics Award for Best Costume Design for the production.

== Filmography ==
Year	Title	Role	Notes
2021	Canada's Drag Race	Contestant	Season 2, 10 episodes
2024	RuPaul's Drag Race Global All Stars	Contestant	11 episodes
2025	Touch-Ups with Raven	Themselves	Guest; 1 episode
2025	Canada's Drag Race	Themselves	Season 6; Guest / Snatch Game contestant (as Zeus)
2026	Canada's Drag Race All Stars	Contestant	3 episodes
