= Synthia Kiss =

Canadian drag performer

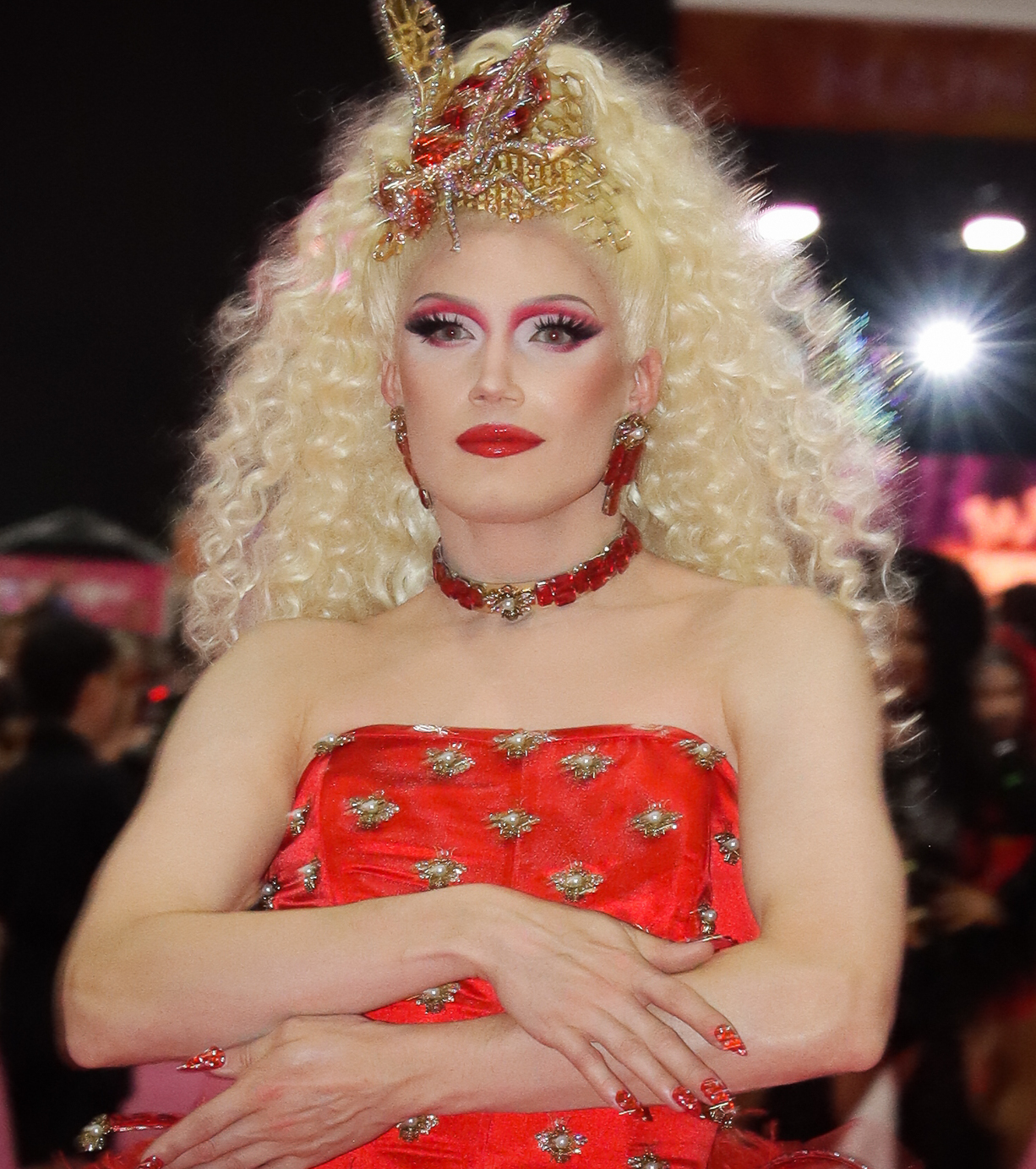
- Synthia Kiss at RuPaul's DragCon LA, 2024
- Born: Daniel Finlan; Peterborough, Ontario, Canada
- Occupation: Drag queen
- Television: Canada's Drag Race (season 2)
- Website: synthiakiss.com

Synthia Kiss is the stage name of Daniel Finlan, a Canadian drag performer most known for competing on season 2 of Canada's Drag Race.

== Early life and education ==
Finlan was born and raised in Peterborough, Ontario. He graduated from fashion school at Ryerson University in Toronto.

== Career ==
Finlan started doing drag after fashion school, in Vancouver. He competed in his first drag competition in 2016. Synthia Kiss was a contestant on season 2 of Canada's Drag Race and finished in seventh place.

Synthia Kiss has regularly performed as part of the "Brat Pack" drag troupe alongside Canada's Drag Race castmates Kendall Gender and Gia Metric.

== Personal life ==
Finlan is based in Vancouver. His brother, Matthew Finlan, is an actor best known as cohost of the CBC Gem web series Ghosting with Luke Hutchie and Matthew Finlan.

== Filmography ==
=== Television ===
- Canada's Drag Race (2021)
- Ghosting with Luke Hutchie and Matthew Finlan (2024)

=== Web series ===
- Bring Back My Girls (2022)

== See also ==
- List of people from Vancouver
