= Icesis Couture =

Canadian drag performer

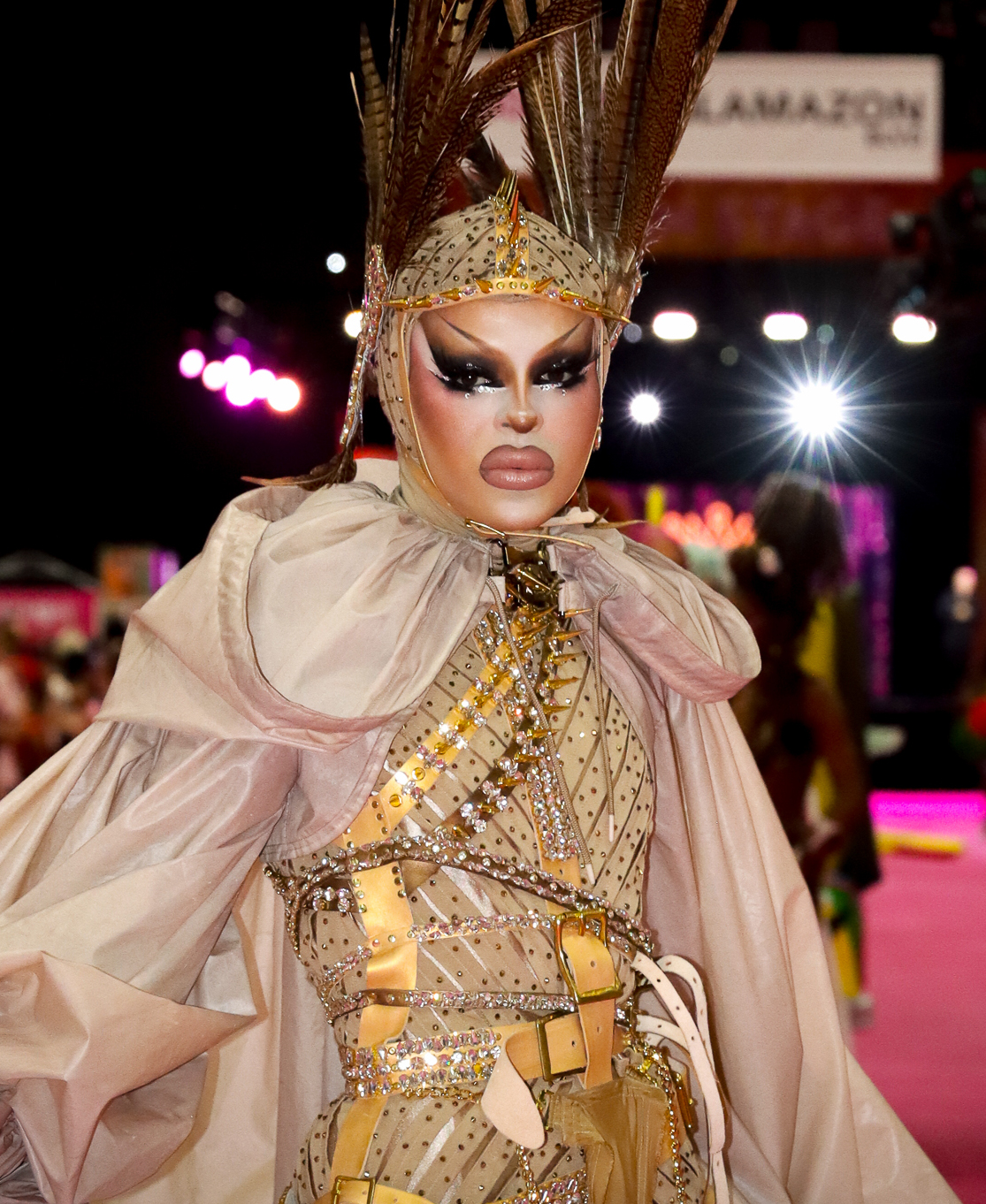
- Icesis Couture at RuPaul's DragCon LA, 2024
- Born: Steven Portelance; February 3, 1987 (age 39); Ottawa, Ontario, Canada
- Other name: Steven Granados-Portelance
- Occupation: Drag queen
- Television: Canada's Drag Race (season 2); Canada's Drag Race: Canada vs. the World (season 1)

Icesis Couture is the stage name of Steven Granados-Portelance (born February 3, 1987), a Canadian drag queen who won the second season of Canada's Drag Race in 2021. She later returned to compete on the first season of the spin-off series, Canada's Drag Race: Canada vs. the World, in 2022.In 2026 she was announced as a contestant on the fourth season of The Traitors Canada alongside fellow Canada’s Drag Race winner Van Goth marking the first ever season of the traitors to feature 2 drag queens.

== Career ==
Drag performer Granados-Portelance appeared as Icesis Couture on the second season of the documentary series Canada's a Drag in 2019, and won Ottawa's Miss Capital Pride pageant in 2020.

In 2021, Icesis Couture competed in the second season of Canada's Drag Race, winning two challenges over the course of the season and ultimately winning the competition over finalists Pythia and Kendall Gender. On the night of the Canada's Drag Race finale, all three finalists were at a viewing party at Toronto's Danforth Music Hall, on a bill that also included Icesis Couture's "drag daughters" Kimmy and Savannah Couture, as well as Makayla Couture, an emerging Toronto drag artist who had appeared in the prom makeover episode as Icesis Couture drag daughter "Ruby Couture". On the same day, Icesis Couture released "La Pusetta", a bilingual English and Spanish pop single and music video created in collaboration with DJ and producer Velvet Code under the music label So Fierce Music. In 2021, Icesis Couture modelled the Amsterdam Rainbow Dress, described as "a voluminous multicoloured gown that embodies a powerful statement about the global persecution of LGBTQ people", at Ottawa's National Gallery of Canada.

In 2022, Icesis Couture returned to compete on Canada's Drag Race: Canada vs. the World against other former competitors from across the Drag Race franchise, including fellow Canada's Drag Race season 2 alumni Kendall Gender and Stephanie Prince. She placed in the top two in the second episode for her impersonation of Donatella Versace in the Snatch Game challenge and was never up for elimination throughout her run. In episode 4, Icesis Couture withdrew from the competition citing her mental health, and placed sixth overall.

In 2023, Icesis Couture participated, alongside fellow CDR alumni Kimora Amour and Suki Doll, in Courage Across Canada, a speaking tour in which the CDR queens spoke to high school students about bullying and homophobia.

Icesis Couture has also worked as a costume and jewelry designer and has made jewelry for Brooke Lynn Hytes and assisted other Canada's Drag Race contestants coming from Ottawa.

In 2026, she is slated to appear in the fourth season of The Traitors Canada.

== Personal life ==
Granados-Portelance is of Salvadoran and French Canadian descent, and lives in Ottawa, Ontario. His younger brother Randy is also a drag queen, who performs under the name Savannah Couture.

Granados-Portelance is a close friend of Kiki Coe, a drag performer who was contemporaneously a competitor in the first season of the drag competition series Call Me Mother and later became a competitor in the fourth season of Canada's Drag Race. Granados-Portelance is also the drag mother of Kimmy Couture, a contestant on the third season of Canada's Drag Race, and Makayla Couture, a contestant on the second season of Call Me Mother and Canada's Drag Race season 5 who Granados-Portelance put into drag for the makeover challenge of Canada's Drag Race season two.

== Filmography ==
=== Television ===
Year	Title	Role	Notes
2019	Canada's a Drag	Herself	Guest; Season 2, episode 2
2021	Canada's Drag Race	Contestant	Winner; Season 2, 10 episodes
2021	eTalk	Herself	Guest
2022	Canada's Drag Race	Herself	Guest; Season 3, episode 9
2022	Canada's Drag Race: Canada vs. the World	Contestant	5 episodes
2025	Slasher: Hell Motel	Magenta	1 episode
2025	Canada's Drag Race	Herself	Guest judge / Snatch Game contestant (as Donatella Versace); Season 6, 1 episode
2026	The Traitors Canada	Contestant	Season 4

=== Web series ===
Year	Title	Role	Notes	Ref
2021	Meet the Queens: Canada's Drag Race Season 2	Herself	Stand-alone special	
2021	iHeartRadio Canada	Herself	Guest	
2022	Drag Us Weekly	Herself	Guest	
2022	Canada's Drag Race S3 x Slap or Scrap	Herself	Guest	
2022	Meet the Queens: Canada's Drag Race vs the World	Herself	Stand-alone special	
2024	Bring Back My Girls	Herself	Guest	

== Discography ==
=== Singles ===
Year	Title	Notes	Ref
2021	"La Pusetta"	Produced by Velvet Code	

Preceded by Priyanka	Winner of Canada's Drag Race; Canada season 2	Succeeded by Gisèle Lullaby
