= Eve 6000 =

Canadian drag performer

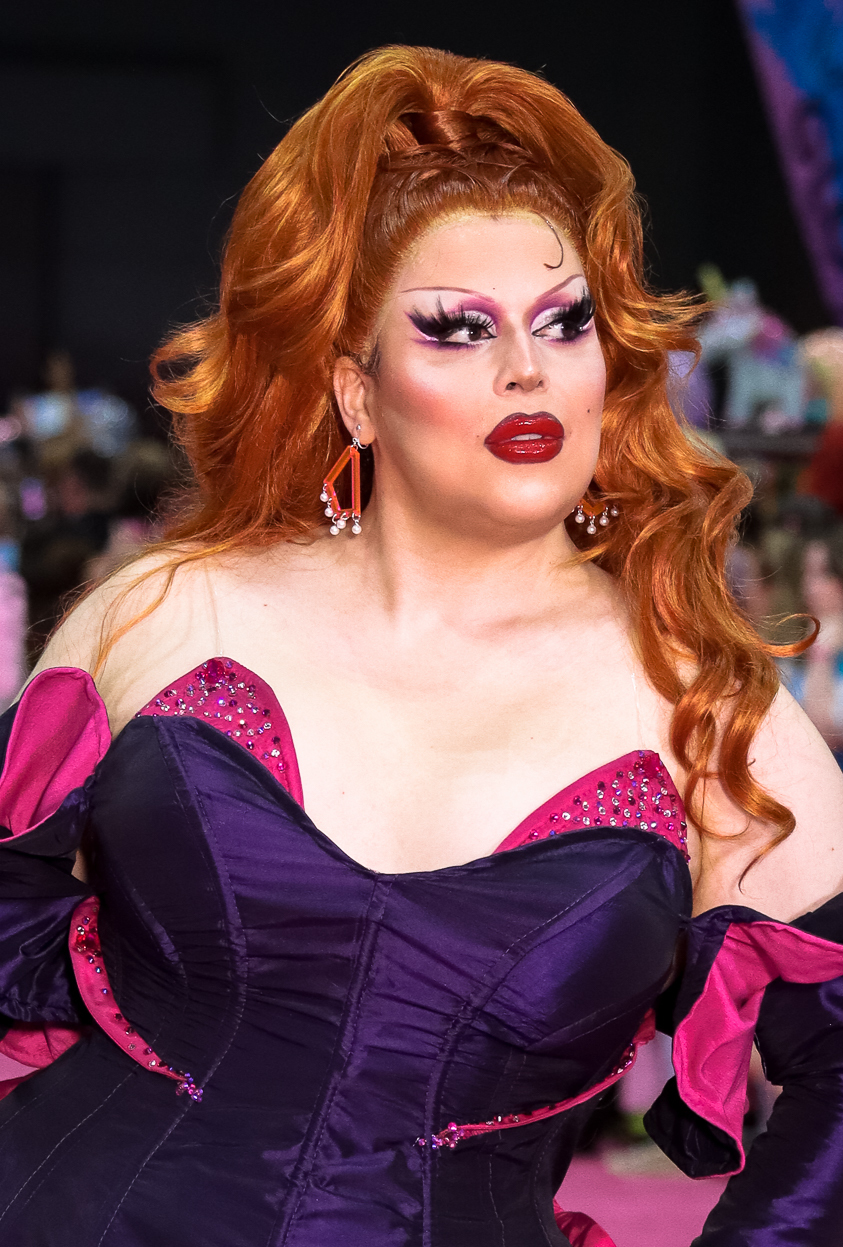
- Eve 6000 at RuPaul's DragCon LA, 2023
- Born: London, Ontario, Canada
- Other name: Rina Adams

Eve 6000 is the stage name of Rina Adams, a Canadian drag performer most known for competing on season 2 of Canada's Drag Race.

== Early life ==
Eve 6000 was born in London, Ontario.

== Career ==
Eve 6000 is a drag performer and illustrator. She was named Miss Angel City Continental Plus 2021. Eve 6000 competed on season 2 of Canada's Drag Race. She impersonated Bernie Sanders for the Snatch Game challenge. Russ Martin of Xtra Magazine said she represented "the trans community as a non-binary performer" on the show. The magazine's Kevin O'Keeffe called her the season's "antagonist" contestant. Eve 6000 and her fellow contestants toured together after the finale. In 2022, she and season 1 contestant BOA started the podcast Death Becomes She/Her.

== Personal life ==
Eve 6000 is based in Toronto. She uses the pronouns she/her in and out of drag. Eve 6000 has said, "As a trans non-binary artist, drag is all about expressing the femininity that I wasn't allowed to express growing up. Drag is a tool that we can all use to express our true selves and be seen as we want to be seen." She came out as a trans woman in February 2022.
