= Gia Metric =

Canadian drag performer

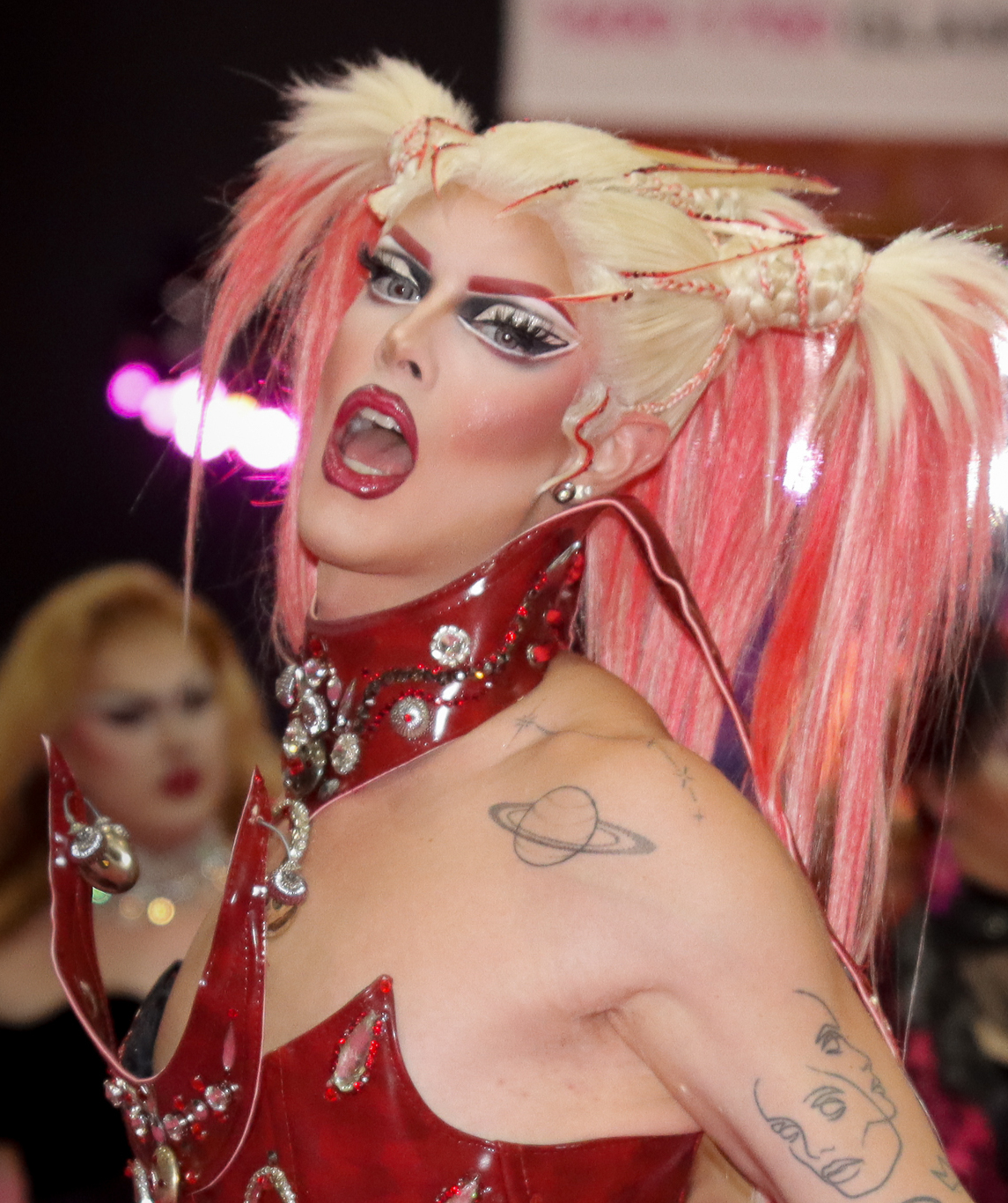
- Gia Metric at RuPaul's DragCon LA, 2024
- Born: Giorgio Triberio; April 16, 1992 (age 34); Toronto, Ontario, Canada
- Television: Canada's Drag Race (season 2)

Gia Metric (born April 16, 1992) is the stage name of Giorgio Triberio, a Canadian drag performer most known for competing on the second season of Canada's Drag Race.

== Early life ==
Triberio was born in Toronto, Ontario.

== Career ==
Gia Metric began her drag career in Toronto. By 2018, she performed at The Junction's weekly drag showcase in Vancouver, along with Kendall Gender and Synthia Kiss. She was named Vancouver's Entertainer of the Year in 2016, and Vancouver's Next Drag Superstar in 2018. Before the COVID-19 pandemic, she performed in drag 2 to 3 times a week, sometimes as part of the group Brat Pack. After shows were cancelled because of the pandemic, the group hosted a three-hour show on Instagram called Bounce Back, and Gia Metric worked with Priyanka to host a Dua Lipa album release party on Instagram.

She competed in the second season (2021) of Canada's Drag Race. Referring to her popularity upon entering the drag competition, Bernardo Sim of Screen Rant described Gia Metric as "the queen with a big reputation that everyone is aware of". She placed in the bottom two during the first episode, but was saved from elimination after winning a lip sync against Beth. In the third episode, she played Blue Scarymore in the slasher film Screech, a parody of Drew Barrymore's character in Scream. She portrayed Jim Carrey during the Snatch Game challenge. She placed fourth in the competition.

Gia Metric walked in New York Fashion Week in 2019. In 2021, she co-hosted Canada's Drag Race viewing parties in Toronto and Vancouver. She is scheduled to appear at RuPaul's DragCon LA in 2022.

== Personal life ==
Triberio is based in Vancouver, as of 2020. Triberio prefers the pronouns they/them out of drag and she/her in drag.

== Filmography ==
=== Television ===
- Canada's Drag Race (season 2)

=== Web series ===
- Bring Back My Girls (2022)
