= Kendall Gender =

Canadian drag performer

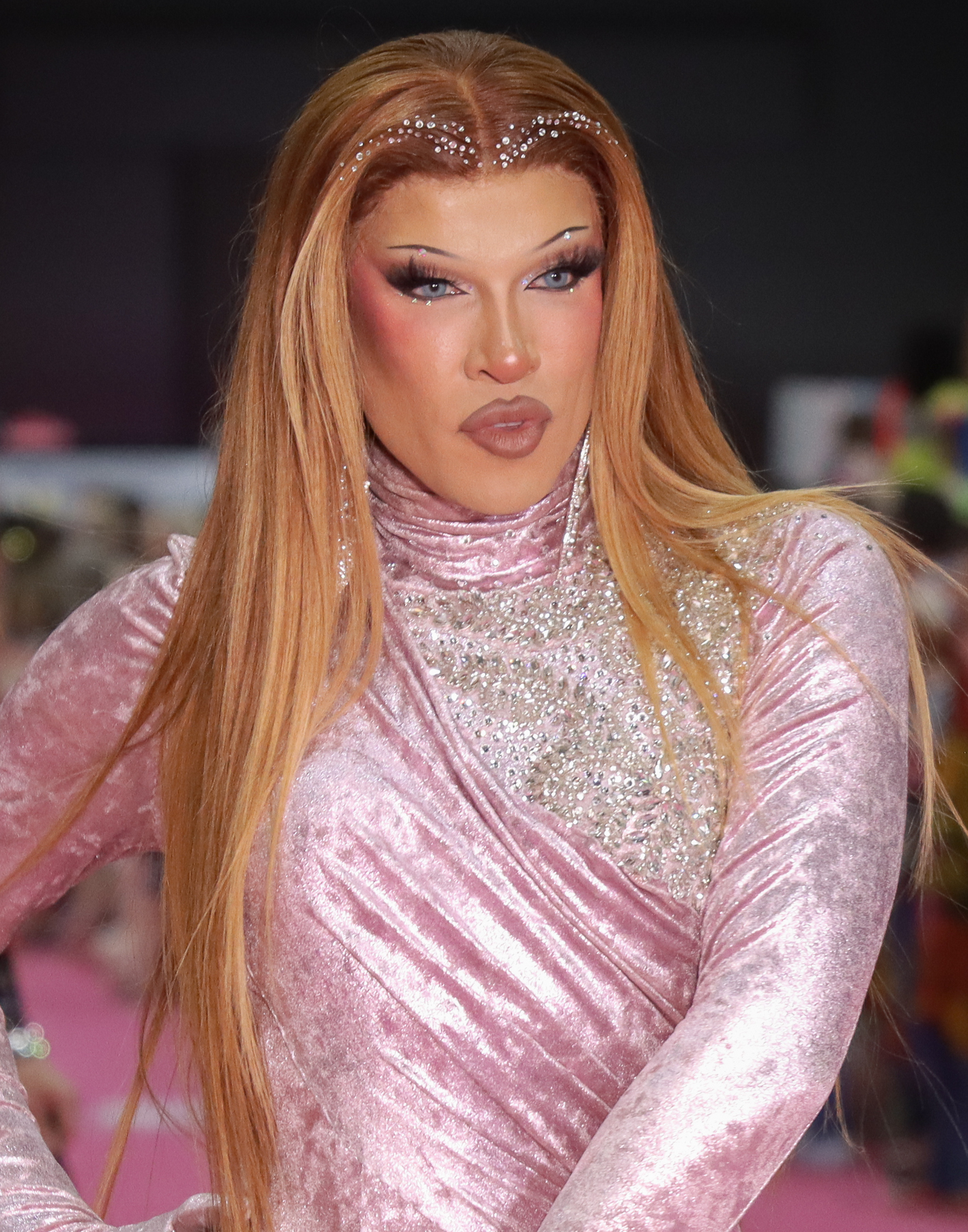
- Kendall Gender at RuPaul's DragCon LA, 2023
- Born: Kenneth Wyse; July 16, 1990 (age 35); Richmond, British Columbia, Canada
- Education: Kwantlen Polytechnic University
- Occupation: Drag queen
- Television: Canada's Drag Race (season 2); Canada's Drag Race: Canada vs. the World (season 1)
- Website: kendallgender.com

Kendall Gender is the stage name of Kenneth Wyse (born July 16, 1990), a Canadian drag performer most known for competing on the second season of Canada's Drag Race in 2021. She returned to compete in the first season of Canada's Drag Race: Canada vs. the World in 2022.

== Early life ==
Wyse was raised in Richmond, British Columbia. He graduated from Henry James Cambie Secondary School in 2008 before attending Kwantlen Polytechnic University.

== Career ==
Wyse chose the drag name Kendall Gender as a reference to reality television personality Kendall Jenner, although for the Snatch Game episode of Canada's Drag Race, she chose to impersonate Kris Jenner.

Her first time in drag was in 2014, where she performed Beyonce's "Ring the Alarm".

Kendall Gender won the Vancouver's Next Drag Superstar competition in 2017. In 2020, she became the first drag performer to perform the halftime show at the Rugby Sevens tournament. She also recreated four albums by Black artists: Beyoncé's Dangerously in Love, Mariah Carey's Merry Christmas, Rihanna's Unapologetic, and Whitney Houston's Whitney. She was a finalist on season 2 of Canada's Drag Race. She won the show's roast challenge.

Following her run on Canada's Drag Race, she was named to Vancouver Magazine's annual Power 50 list of influential Vancouverites. She has appeared in a campaign for Canadian swim and loungewear brand Londre and is the face of Annabelle cosmetics' Proud Out Loud collection.

== Personal life ==
Wyse is biracial (half black and half white). He is based in Vancouver, where he has regularly performed as part of the "Brat Pack" drag troupe alongside his Canada's Drag Race castmates Synthia Kiss and Gia Metric.

== Filmography ==
Year	Title	Genre	Role	Notes
2021	Canada's Drag Race	TV	Contestant	Season 2, 10 episodes (Runner-up)
2022	Canada's Drag Race: Canada vs. the World	TV	Contestant	Season 1, 1 episode (9th Place)
2023	Stay	Short Film	Ivy Diamonds / Kaleb	Premiere in the 18th Vancouver International Women in Film Festival
2024	Alert: Missing Persons Unit	TV	Canary / Drag Queen	Season 2, Episode 4 & 10

=== Web series ===
Year	Title	Role	Notes	Ref
2021	Meet the Queens: Canada's Drag Race Season 2	Herself	Stand-alone special	
2021	eTalk	Herself	Guest	
2022	It Gets Better Canada	Herself	Guest with Patch Donaghy	
2022	Meet the Queens: Canada's Drag Race vs The World	Herself	Stand-alone special	

- Bring Back My Girls (2024)
