= Jump, Darling =

2020 Canadian drama film

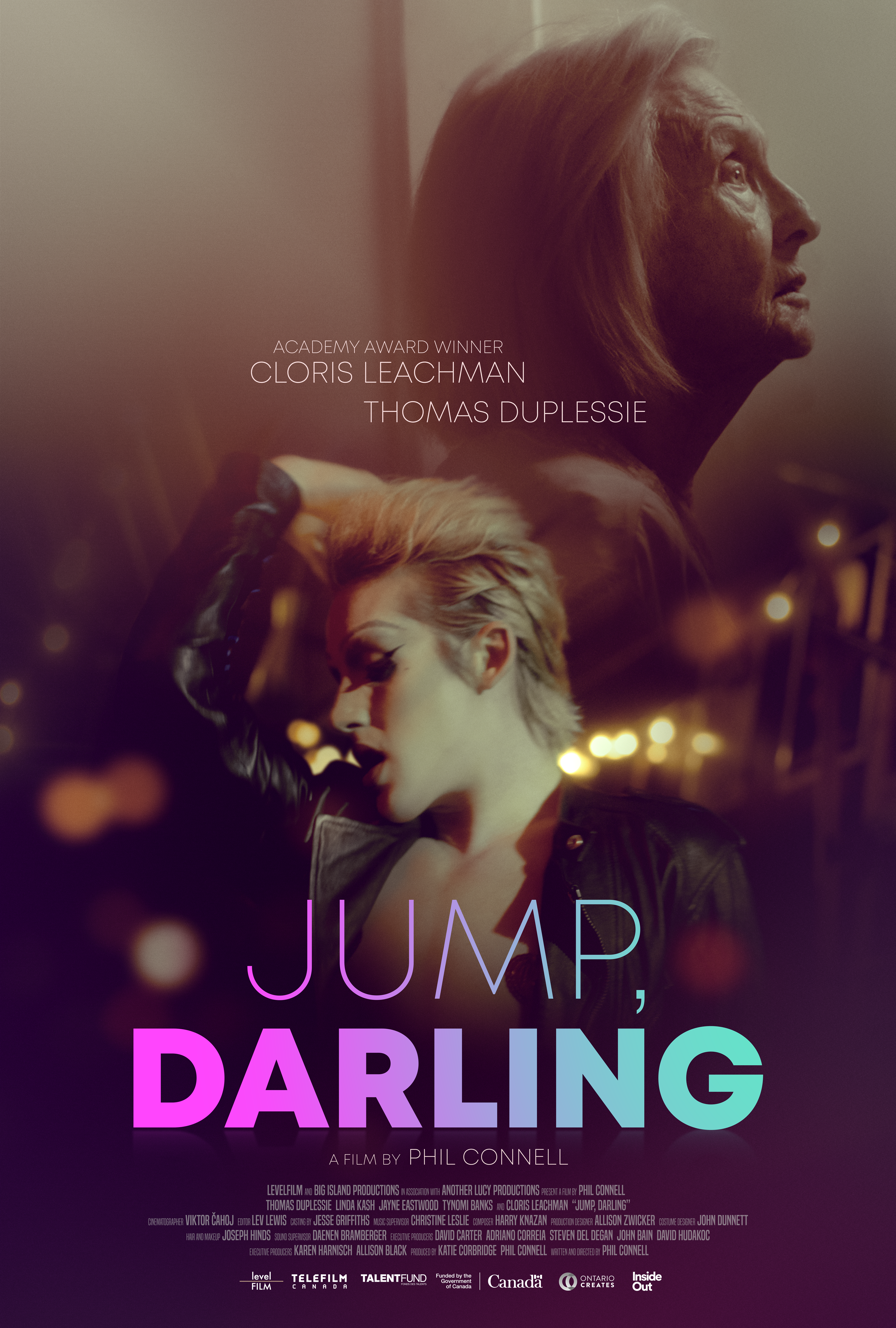
- Directed by: Phil Connell
- Written by: Phil Connell
- Produced by: Phil Connell; Katie Corbidge
- Starring: Cloris Leachman; Thomas Duplessie; Linda Kash; Jayne Eastwood
- Cinematography: Viktor Cahoj
- Edited by: Lev Lewis
- Music by: Harry Knazan
- Production companies: Big Island Productions; 2645850 Ontario
- Distributed by: Breaking Glass Pictures (USA); Levelfilm (Canada); Outplay (France); Great Movies Distribution (Latin America)
- Release date: October 2, 2020 (Inside Out)
- Running time: 90 minutes
- Country: Canada
- Language: English

Jump, Darling is a 2020 Canadian drama film directed by Phil Connell. The film stars Thomas Duplessie as Russell, a rookie drag queen reeling from a break-up, who escapes to Prince Edward County, where he finds his grandmother Margaret (Cloris Leachman) in steep decline yet desperate to avoid the local nursing home. The film was one of Leachman's final performances before her death in 2021.

The film's cast also includes Linda Kash as Russell's mother Ene and Jayne Eastwood as town busybody Jeanne, as well as real-life Toronto drag queens Tynomi Banks, Miss Fiercalicious and Fay Slift.

== Production ==
The film was supported by the Inside Out Film and Video Festival's LGBTQ Finance Forum in 2017, and Leachman's casting was announced in 2019. The film was also supported by Telefilm Canada's Talent to Watch program for emerging filmmakers, and will be distributed in Canada by LevelFILM.

The film inspired in part by Connell's conversations with his own grandmother, who went through declining health in the early 2010s before her death. He has indicated that the film is not meant to be understood as autobiographical, although he has acknowledged parallels between Russell's efforts to establish himself as a drag artist and his own status as an emerging LGBTQ filmmaker.

The film was shot in 2019, primarily in Prince Edward County with some followup shooting in Toronto. While in Toronto, Leachman and her daughter spent some time out on Church Street during the Pride Toronto festivities.

Following production on the film, Duplessie and Connell began dating.

== Release ==
The film screened in an exclusive preview presentation to a hometown audience hosted by Inside Out in 2020. Due to the COVID-19 pandemic, Leachman was unable to personally attend the premiere, but was able to watch the film from home through a private streaming link.

The film had its international premiere at BFI Flare, and its American premiere at the Frameline Film Festival. It was later screened at Outfest in Los Angeles, where Leachman won an award for best performance.

The film was commercially released in Canada to video on demand platforms such as Apple TV+, Google Play and the proprietary platform of distributor levelFILM on March 9, 2021. Staggered theatrical exhibition across Canada continued throughout 2021 as the pandemic allowed.

Breaking Glass Pictures (Philadelphia) acquired the film for US distribution acquisition in late 2021 following a string of international sales in Europe, Asia and Latin America negotiated by the film’s international sales agent Wide Management (Paris), while US festival distribution has been handled by The Film Collaborative (Los Angeles). LevelFilm one of the film’s production partners, holds Canadian rights, and released the film across VOD platforms in Canada in March 2021, while continuing staggered theatrical exhibition in 2021 and 2022.

Jump, Darling was released in the U.S. on March 11, 2022.

== Critical response ==
Writing for The Queer Review, Glenn Gaylord praised Duplessie and Leachman's work in the film, stating that Duplessie made Russell's drag performances so strong that "he could win every Lip Sync For Your Life moment on Canada's Drag Race", and applauding Leachman's ability to give such a strong and fearless performance at age 94. Of Leachman, he wrote that "you can’t easily manufacture her presence, her force, and her power. You see every wrinkle, every aging bone, and every slow, careful movement. I savored it, knowing this could easily be one of her last picture shows."

Writing for the Postmedia Network chain of newspapers, Chris Knight praised Leachman's performance, writing that "Jump, Darling is Connell’s feature directing debut, and he wisely doesn’t bite off more than he can narratively chew. In addition to watching Margaret and Russell slowly feel each other out across the generational divide, we get to see him perform at what is apparently the only gay bar in the county. His lip-synced rendition of Rough Trade's High School Confidential is a showstopper, and a bit of added CanCon to boot."

Noting that the film turned out to be Cloris Leachman's final leading film role before she died in January 2021, Screen International called the film "very real and very moving" while the UK Mirror described it as a "powerful swan song". The San Francisco Chronicle went on to describe Leachman's performance as Margaret as a "fitting final role".

Writing for Original Cin, Linda Barnard gave the film an A− rating, writing that "the film leans on a well-worn setup about a troubled grandson and his frail-but-feisty grandmother. But casting Leachman as Margaret and remarkable newcomer Thomas Duplessie as budding drag queen grandkid Russell propels Jump, Darling into the winner’s circle. Connell further comes through with a solid script sprinkled with often-delightful dialogue." Further praised Duplessie's drag performance, writing "Of course, a movie about drag performers has to have at least one big number. Jump, Darling has a half-dozen outstanding ones. You can’t take your eyes of the lithe and charismatic Duplessie, whose character uses performances to deal with anger and issues. Duplessie blows the roof off the place with an incendiary version of Rough Trade’s “High School Confidential,” another sweet kiss of CanCon."

On Rotten Tomatoes, it has an overall approval rating of 90% with an average score of 6.90/10 based on 21 reviews. The site's critical consensus reads: "Jump, Darling covers familiar territory in refreshingly affecting fashion, with debuting writer-director Phil Connell facilitating fine work from a talented cast.".
