= Canadian National Exhibition =

Annual fair held in Toronto

Coordinates: 43°38′0″N 79°25′0″W

- Nickname: The Ex
- Genre: Fair; Agricultural and Entertainment
- Dates: 18 days (from third Friday of August to Labour Day)
- Frequency: Annually
- Venue: Exhibition Place
- Locations: Toronto, Ontario
- Country: Canada
- Founded: 1879; 147 years ago
- Most recent: August 21 — September 7, 2026
- Next event: August 20 — September 6, 2027
- Attendance: 1.604 million (2023)
- Website: theex.com

The Canadian National Exhibition (CNE), also known as The Exhibition or The Ex, is an annual fair that takes place at Exhibition Place in Toronto, Ontario, Canada, on the third or fourth Friday of August leading up to and including Labour Day, the first Monday in September. With approximately 1.6 million visitors each year, the CNE is Canada's largest annual community event and one of the top fairs in North America.

The exhibition, then known as the Toronto Industrial Exhibition, first took place in 1879, largely to promote agriculture and technology in Toronto and area. Agriculturists, engineers, and scientists exhibited their discoveries and inventions at the CNE. The event has since expanded to include a carnival, live music, parades, an air show, various entertainments, sporting events, as well as art displays and specialty vendors and foods. Special events include the Warriors' Day Parade, the Labour Day Parade and the Canadian International Air Show.

== Site ==
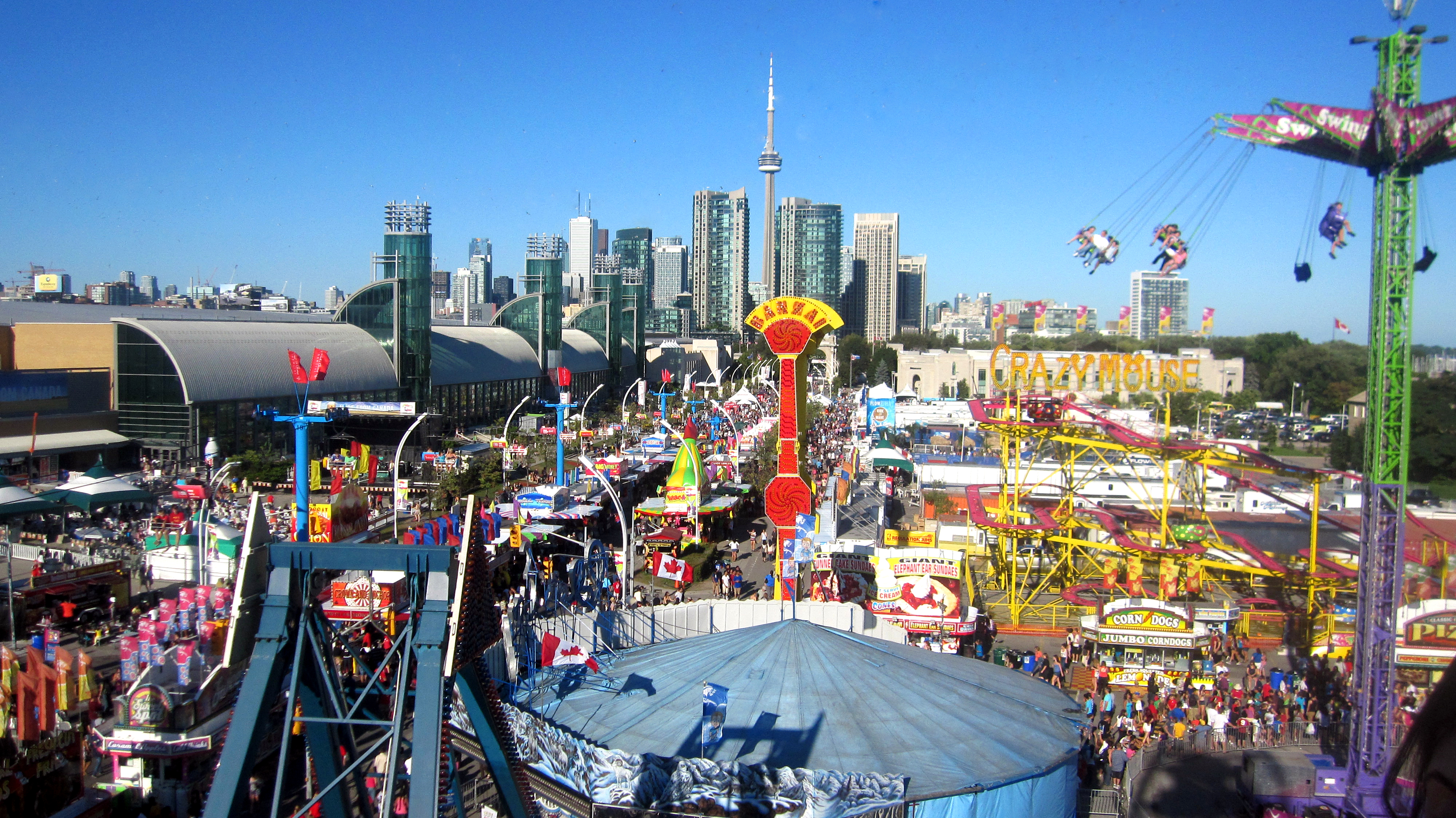
The CNE Midway on August 31, 2012

The CNE is held at Exhibition Place, which is a 192 acres (78 ha) site located along Toronto's waterfront on the shores of Lake Ontario just west of downtown Toronto. The site features several permanent buildings and structures, many of which have been named as significant under the Ontario Heritage Act. There are several outdoor live music venues on-site including the CNE Bandshell. All of the roads are named after the Canadian provinces and territories. The site includes a football and soccer stadium, basketball practice facility, green space, fountains, plazas, a rose garden, statues and parking lots.

Historically, it is the site of Fort Rouillé, an 18th-century French fort, marked by a monument. As part of the settlement of Toronto by the British, the site became a military reserve for use by the Toronto Garrison of Fort York and cleared of forest in the early 19th century. The Exhibition received permission to use part of the reserve in the 1870s and expanded to use the whole reserve by the 1920s. In the 1950s, the site was expanded south of Lake Shore Boulevard by landfill, and reduced in size on its northern boundary by the construction of the Gardiner Expressway. During the fair, the portion of the site west of Dufferin Street is no longer used.

== Points of interest ==
=== Shows and attractions ===
The 18-day event consists of a mix of live entertainment, agricultural displays, exhibits, a large carnival midway with many rides, games and food, casino, sports events and shopping areas. The Canadian International Air Show on Labour Day weekend has been a major feature of the fair since 1949, held over Lake Ontario just south of the CNE grounds. There are two major parades at the CNE, the Warriors' Day Parade of veterans on the first Saturday of the fair and the Labour Day Parade of workers on Labour Day. The Warriors' Day Parade honours Canada's military veterans and includes military vehicles.

The Canadian Armed Forces has a display each year at the fair. The fair is not affiliated with the Government of Canada; however, the federal government has often had exhibits at the CNE and has had its own pavilion.

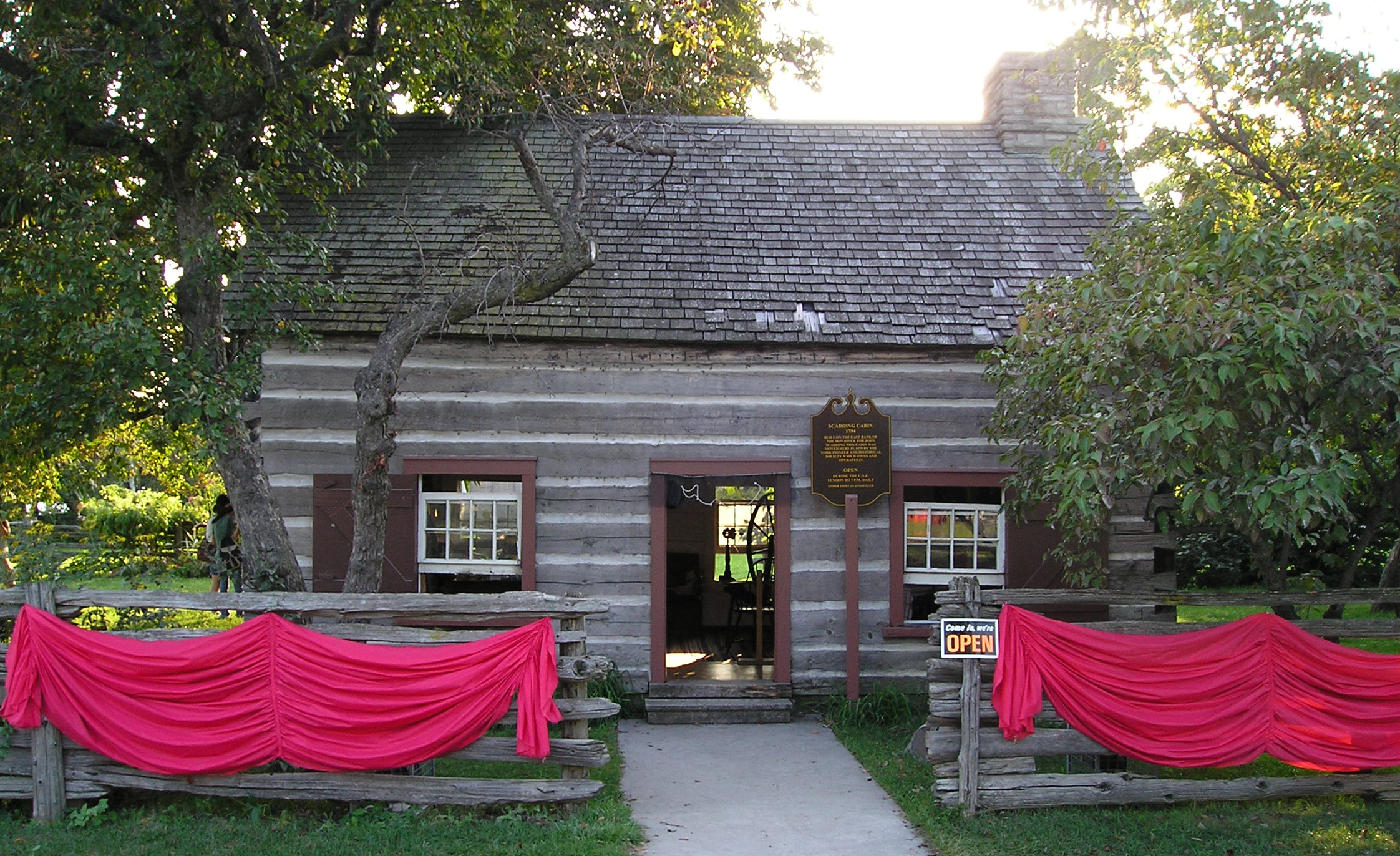
Toronto's oldest standing structure, Scadding Cabin, a log cabin dating to 1794, is open to the public during the CNE.

Several buildings house exhibits and displays from vendors, government agencies and various industry associations. These include the International Pavilion of products from around the world, and the Arts, Crafts and Hobbies Building which features unique items and collectibles. The Enercare Centre complex holds the International Pavilion, a garden show, and the SuperDogs performances. It also has exhibit space used for agricultural or industrial displays and a live stage. The Food Building houses a large number of vendors offering food from many cultures, reflecting Toronto's multicultural population. The Better Living Centre building is used for the CNE Casino on one side, and an agricultural display on the other. The CNE continues its tradition of agricultural produce competitions and the winners are displayed in the Better Living Centre.

The 1794 "Scadding Cabin" log cabin dates back to the first year of the fair, when it was moved here from its original location. The cabin was the residence of an early Upper Canada colonist John Scadding. The cabin is only open to the public during the CNE.

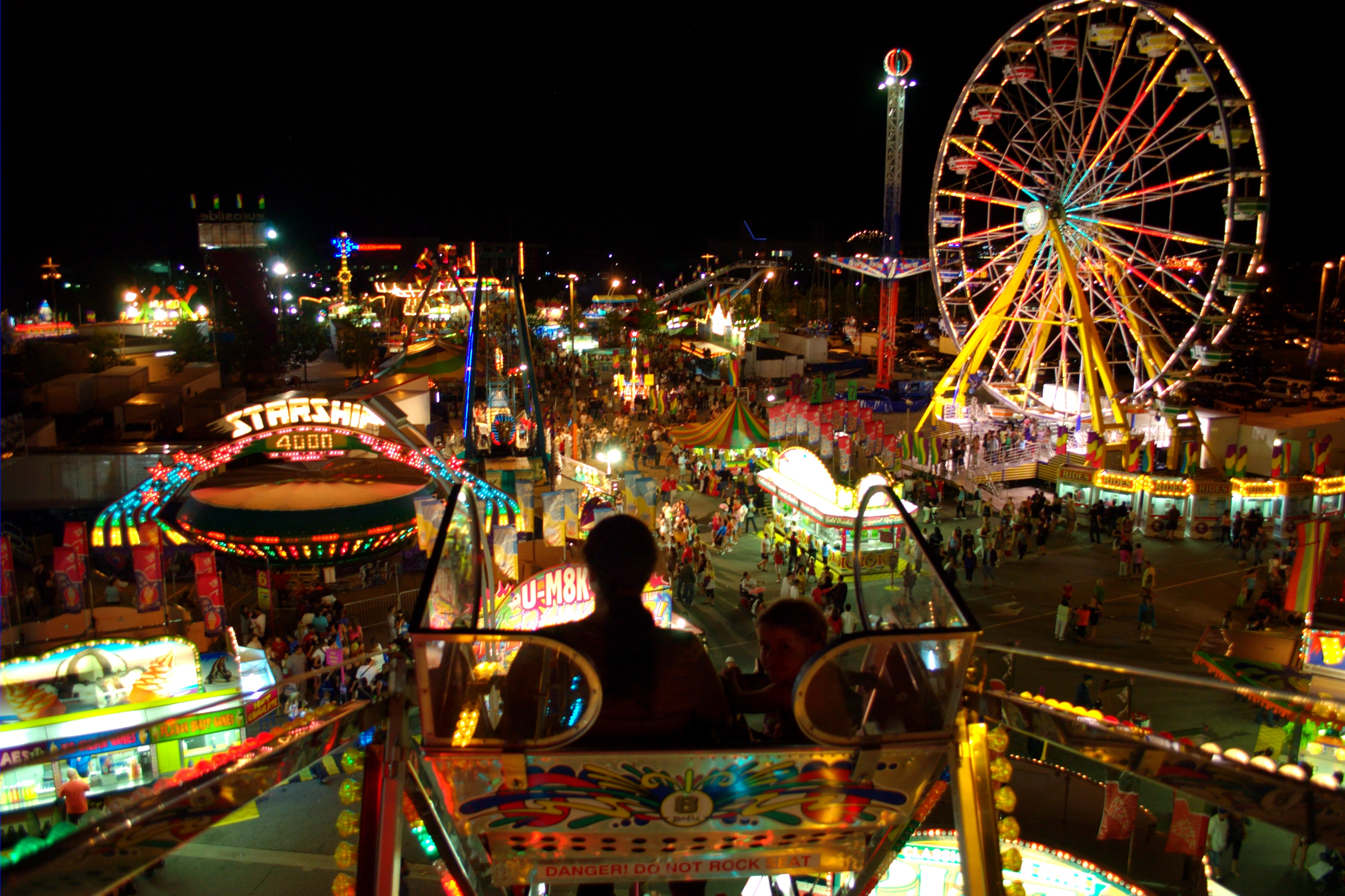
The Canadian National Exhibition includes a carnival midway in the centre of Exhibition Place.

The fair has two midways of rides and carnival games. The Kiddie Midway is located in the northwest corner of Exhibition Place, with smaller rides suitable for children under 12. The midway for older youths and adults is situated west of the Enercare Centre and south of BMO Field. It has several dozen rides, including thrill rides, roller coasters, swing rides and a log plume ride. Along several pathways of the midway area are carnival games of "skill", games of chance and many carnival food vendors. The CNE operates a "sky ride", with chairs similar to ski-lift chairs, to carry riders from just west of the Princes' Gates to south of BMO Field.

The Coca-Cola Coliseum is used for live shows. Including high-wire acts, skating, and the RCMP Musical Ride in the past, most recently was an aerial and acrobatic show featuring Olympic skater Elvis Stojko. Outdoors, the Bandshell is used for daily music and nightly headliners. Additionally, areas are set up at various points around the ground for outdoor entertainment. These include such things as beer gardens, musical acts, acrobatic acts, buskers, parkour displays, circus acts, children's shows and educational displays.

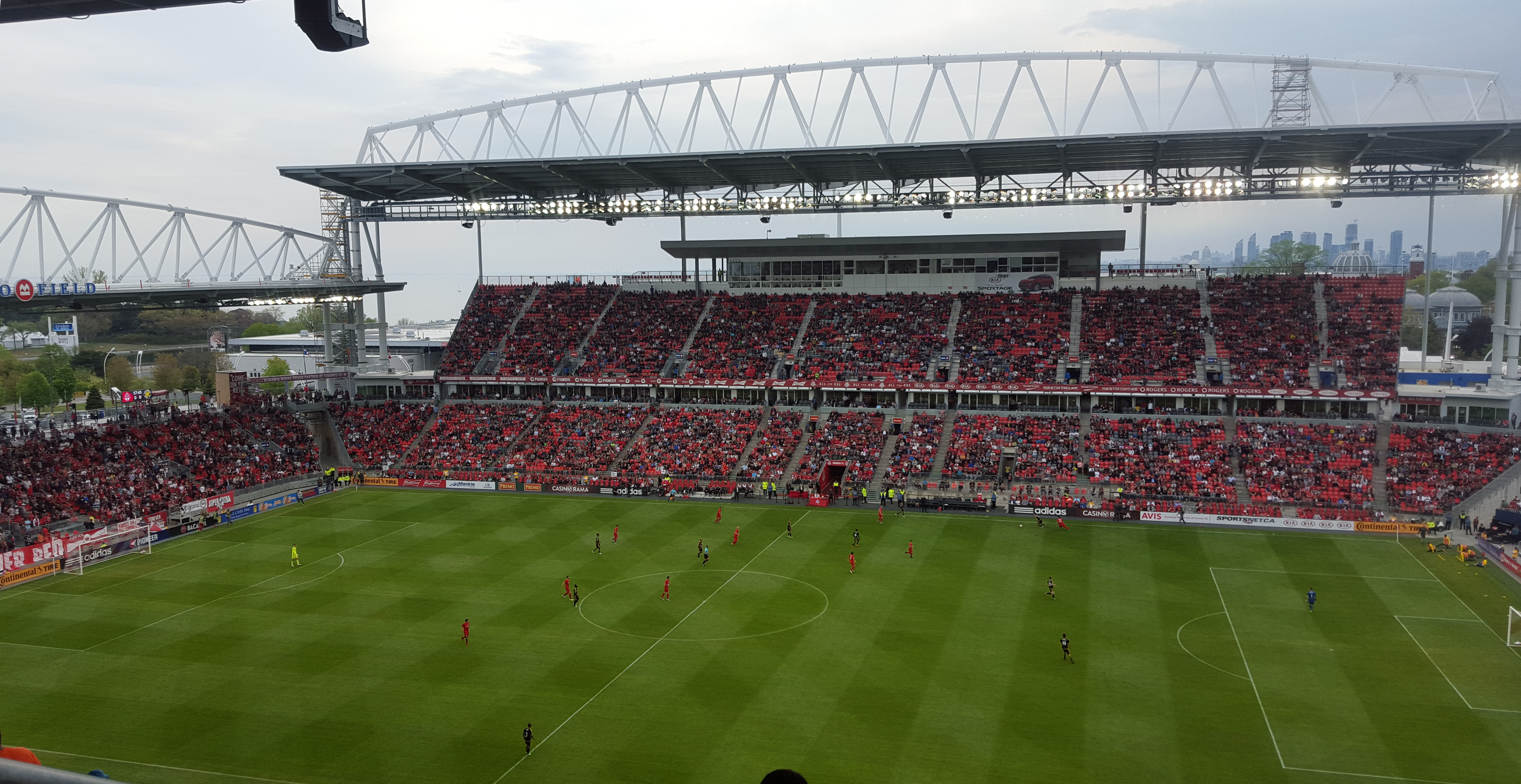
BMO Field is a multi-purpose stadium located in the centre of the fair grounds.

The CNE grounds is also home to BMO Field, a large multi-purpose facility located in the centre of the grounds. The stadium is used by two professional sports teams based in Toronto, the Toronto Argonauts Canadian football team and the Toronto FC soccer (association football) team. Each team plays at least one home game during the fair.

The CNE holds several sports tournaments during the fair. At Coronation Park, located across Lake Shore Boulevard, to the east of the Princes' Gates, the CNE holds two baseball tournaments. It holds a youth peewee baseball tournament and a girl's fastball tournament. The tournaments used to be played at a baseball diamond in the far west corner of Exhibition Place, but that diamond was replaced by the OVO Athletic Centre. At the Centre, the CNE holds a 3-on-3 basketball tournament.

Each night of the fair, live music is presented at the CNE Bandshell. It is an outdoor venue in the west end of the park, with a stage reminiscent of the Hollywood Bowl and bench seats in a park-like setting that gently slopes down to the Bandshell. Built in the 1930s, the stage has had a huge number of performances from famous entertainers from many different genres over the years. In the past, the various Exhibition Stadiums hosted large outdoor concerts. The current BMO Field is not used for outdoor live concerts, preserving the field's surface for sports. Today, the Budweiser Stage south of Lake Shore Boulevard in Ontario Place hosts large live concerts during the Ex and all summer long. During the fair, several stages are set up at different places, with live music in a beer garden setting.

=== Food ===
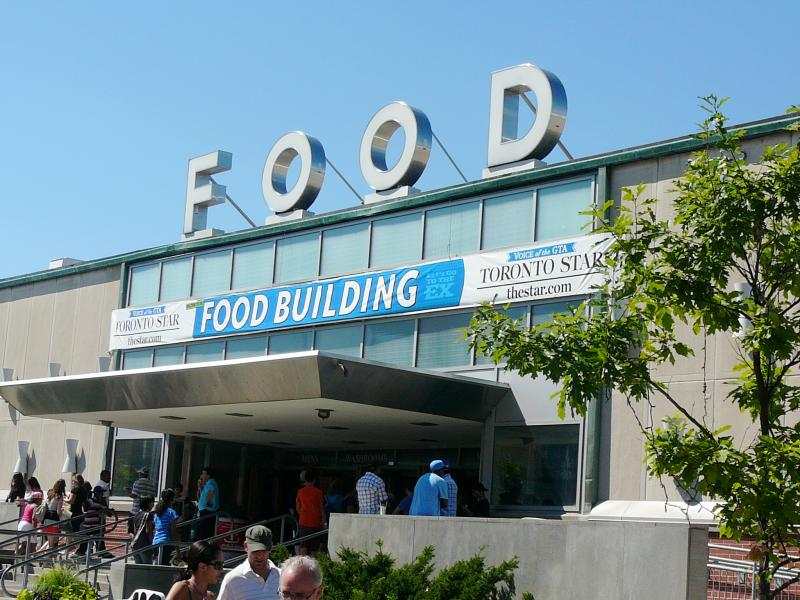
The Food Building at the Canadian National Exhibition

Many options are available across the site during the fair. The CNE Food Building offers a wide variety of food options including desserts, international cuisine, and fast food, as well as novelty items, including Frosted Flake, Battered Chicken on a Stick, Deep Fried Red Velvet Oreos and Bacon Wrapped Grilled Cheese. Halal, vegetarian and healthy food options are also widely available. The Food Building, which opened September 1, 1954, celebrates its 70th anniversary in 2024.

Since the 2012 season, the CNE has hosted a food truck rally called "Food Truck Frenzy." This event takes place on Princes' Boulevard just inside the Princes' Gates at the east end of the grounds. The 2016 edition featured 26 food trucks serving specialty foods. A "Craft Beer Fest" was added to the event in 2015 and continues to this day. During the fair, several licensed restaurants operate on the grounds.

=== Shopping ===
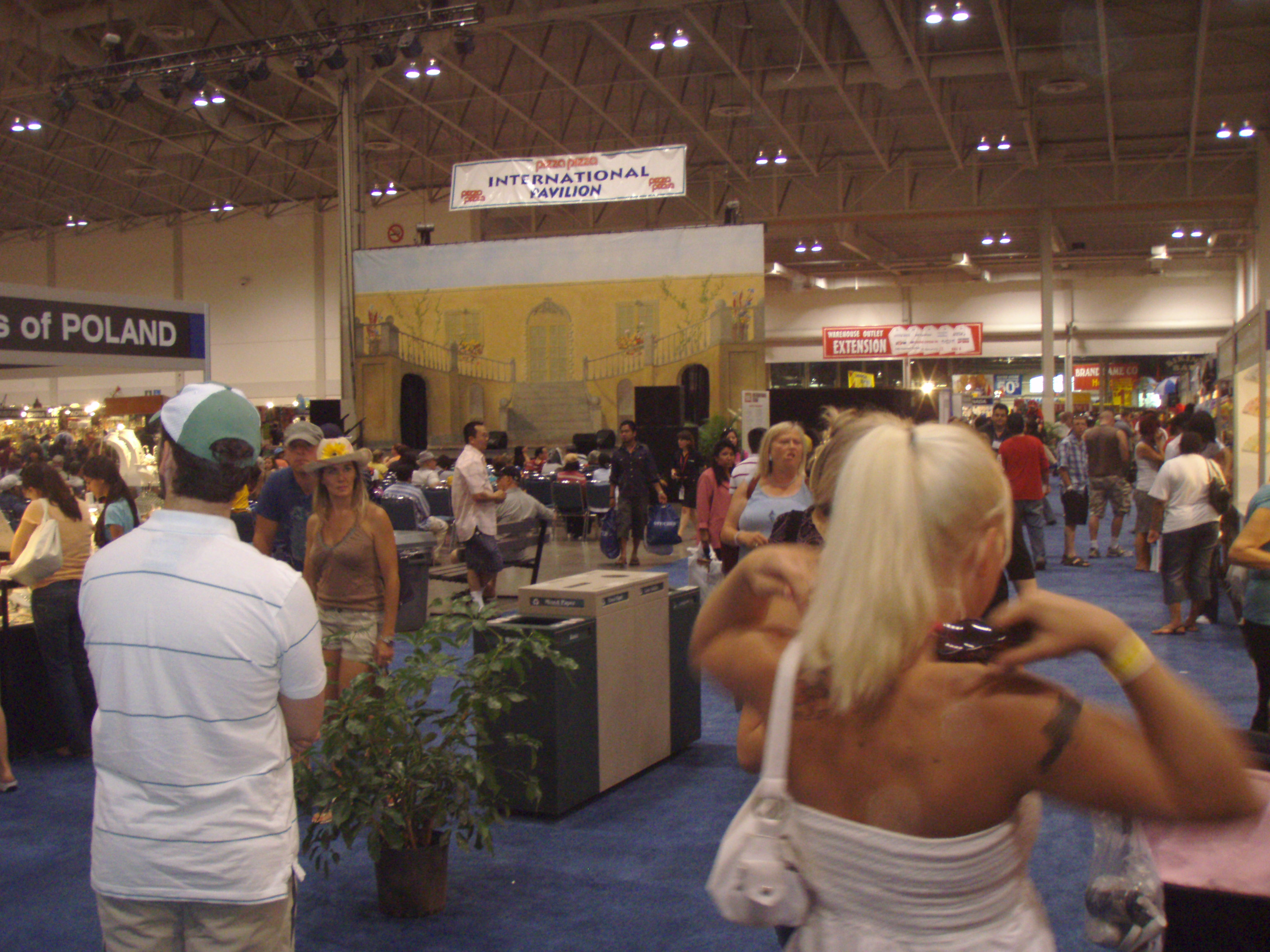
Market stands at the International Pavilion. The CNE hosts a number of markets and shops.

Several shopping opportunities are available for visitors at the CNE:

Queen Elizabeth Building:

- Arts, Crafts and Hobbies

Enercare Centre:

- Gaming Garage
- Home and Garden Pavilion
- International Pavilion
- Shoppers' Market
- Warehouse Outlets

Outdoors:

- Booths line several streets of the fair ground.

== History ==
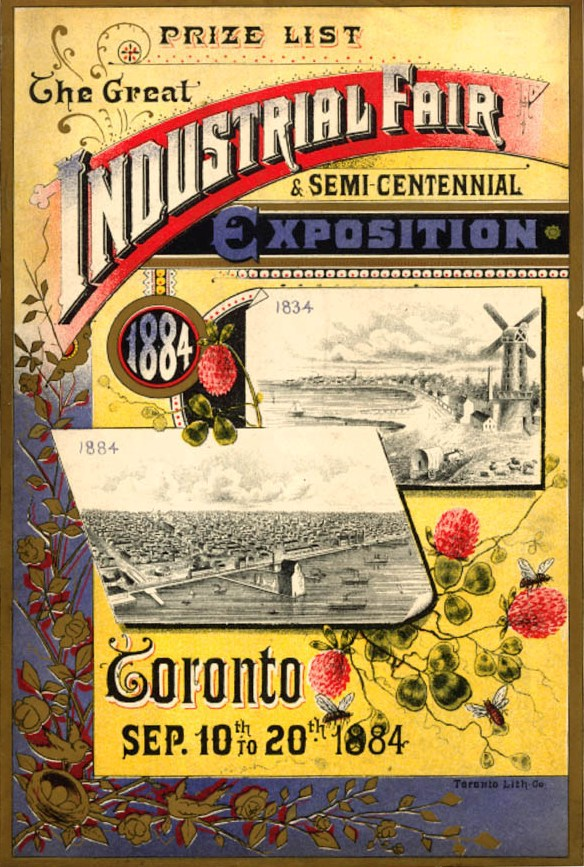
An advertisement for the 1884 Toronto Industrial Exhibition. Established in 1879, the exhibition became the Canadian National Exhibition in 1903.

In September 1846, the Provincial Agricultural Fair of Canada West, sponsored by the Provincial Agricultural Association and the Board of Agriculture for Canada West, was held in Toronto in the area near present-day King and Simcoe Streets. While primarily an agricultural event, it also displayed manufactured goods and decorative arts and crafts. The fair was a success, and it was proposed that future fairs be held in different locations each year. In 1847, the fair was held in Hamilton and thereafter travelled to such cities as Cobourg, Kingston, Niagara, and Brockville.

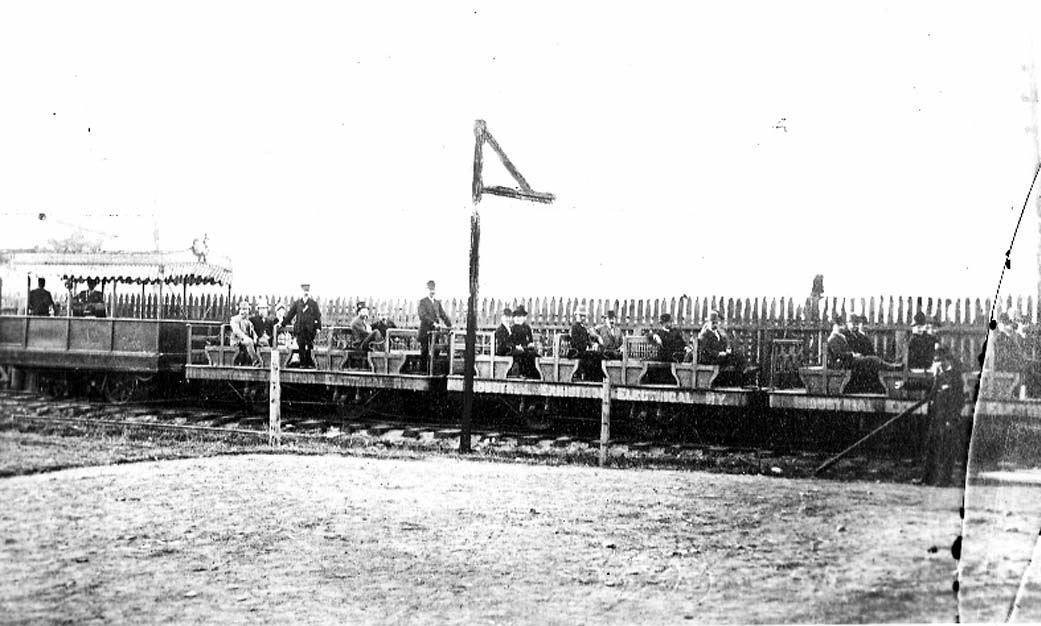
Electric railways at the CNE in 1884. The railways had been introduced to the CNE the previous year.

In 1852, the fair returned to the west side of University Avenue (see Grange Park (neighbourhood)), stretching from a bit north of Dundas Street to a bit south of College Street. It lasted four days. The Horse Park, on the west side of the grounds, was loaned to the fair by Mrs. Boulton, who lived in the Grange, and it was bounded on the north by the Caer Howell Pleasure Grounds (in a way a forerunner of the midway). The fair was a success, attracting more than 30,000 visitors. In 1853, the fair moved on to another city and didn't return to Toronto until 1858 when the fair was held at the new Dufferin Street site. In 1878, Toronto again hosted the fair. Afterwards, Toronto City Council and the local Exhibition Committee approached the Provincial Agriculture Association with a proposition: that the fair remain permanently in Toronto. The Association thanked City Council and the Exhibition Committee for their work in delivering a successful fair in 1878 but informed them that a decision had already been made to move the fair to another city in 1879.

Toronto City Council, along with local businessmen, moved ahead with plans to establish a permanent fair in Toronto. The new fair, known as the Toronto Industrial Exhibition, opened on September 2, 1879, and lasted for three weeks (Sundays excepted). The 50 acres (20 ha) site hosted an attendance of more than 100,000 paid admissions and 8,234 exhibits.

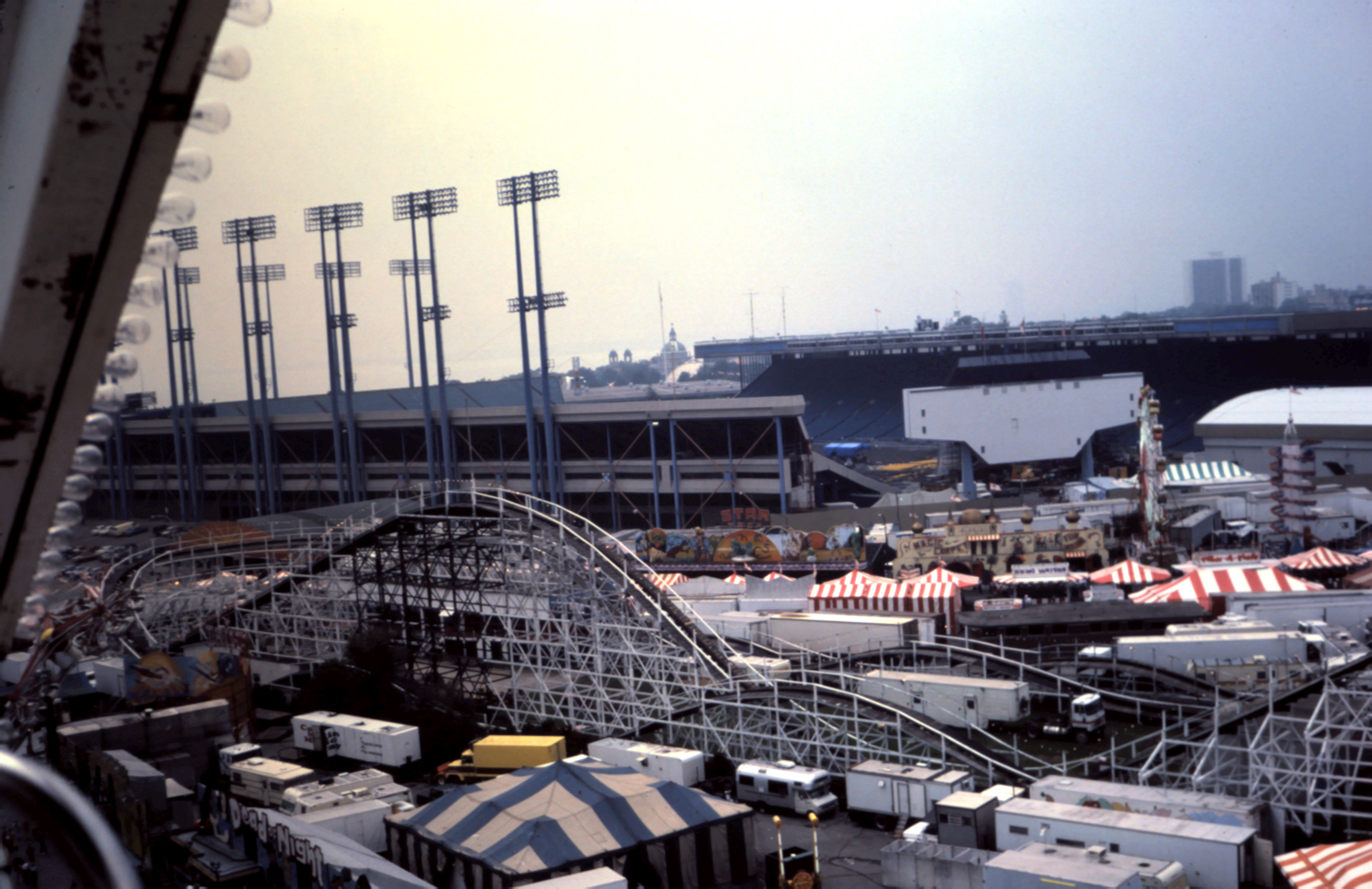
The now vanished "Flyer" rollercoaster, and the likewise vanished Exhibition Stadium at the CNE in 1985, as seen from the giant Ferris wheel.

As the fair grew, it exhibited the latest technological advances. Exhibition patrons were introduced to electric railway transportation in 1883, to "Edison's Perfected Phonograph" in 1888, to "wireless telegraphy" at the 1899 fair, radio in the 1920s, to television in 1939, to plastics and synthetics in the 1940s.

In its twenty-fifth iteration, the 1903 fair was the first known as the Canadian National Exhibition, and it was officially opened by Lord Strathcona.

In 1937, Conklin Shows was awarded the contract to provide amusement rides and games for the CNE midway. The company was sold in 2004 for US$100 million and merged with two other carnival operators to form North American Midway Entertainment, which now operates the midway.

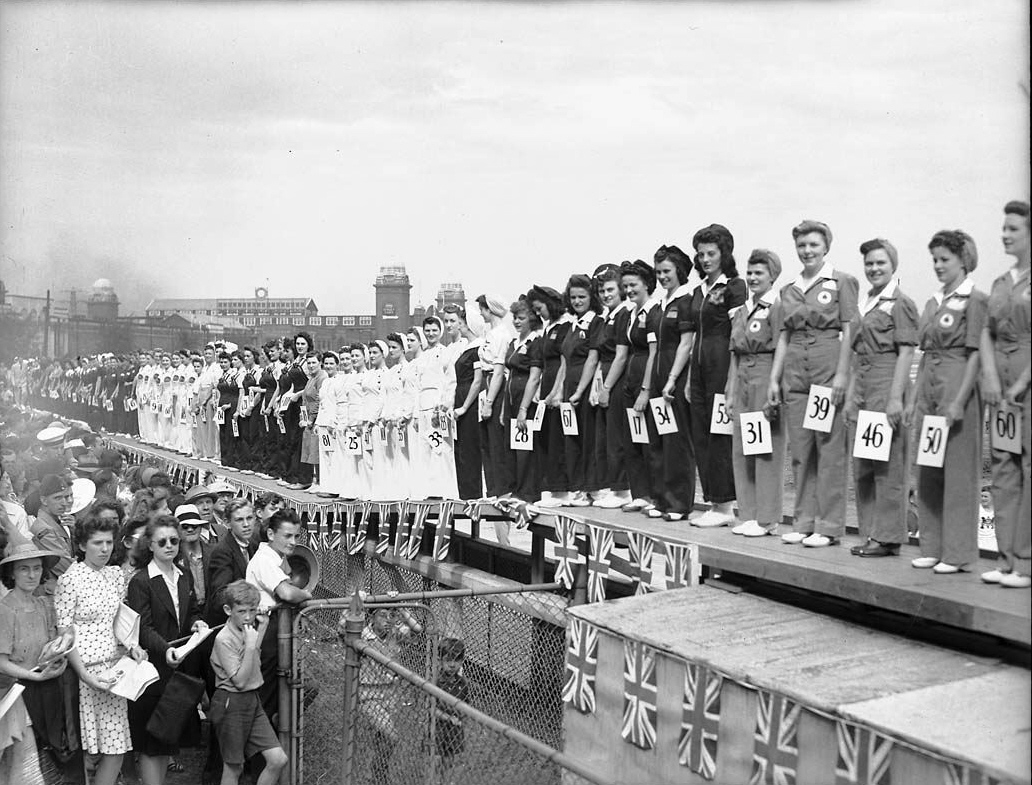
Miss War Worker Beauty Contest held at the CNE during the Second World War.

During the Second World War, as during the First World War, the CNE grounds became home to detachments of the Canadian military. In 1939, the Royal Canadian Air Force moved into the Coliseum. The Canadian Army took over the Horse Palace and the Royal Canadian Navy converted the Automotive Building into HMCS York. During the summers of 1940 and 1941, most of the troops stationed at the CNE were re-located. Those troops remaining either continued their regular administrative duties or participated in CNE displays and events aimed at promoting the Canadian war effort. CNE officials had hoped to continue the annual fair throughout the years of the war. In the spring of 1942, however, the CNE agreed to turn the grounds over to the Canadian military for use year-round. During the military occupation of the grounds, virtually every CNE building, large or small, was used by the Canadian armed forces. The CNE grounds remained closed and under the control of the Canadian military until 1946. Between 1945 and 1946, Exhibition Park was a demobilization centre for returning troops at the end of the war before closing on June 1, 1946.

The CNE resumed in 1947 without the Grandstand. Patrons returned to the CNE to see the latest in consumer goods and agricultural advancements. In 1949, the Canadian International Air Show was held for the first time at the fair. In 1968, blue laws were relaxed, allowing the CNE to open on Sundays. The CNE added the Better Living Centre, the Queen Elizabeth building and the Shell Oil Tower in the post-war period.

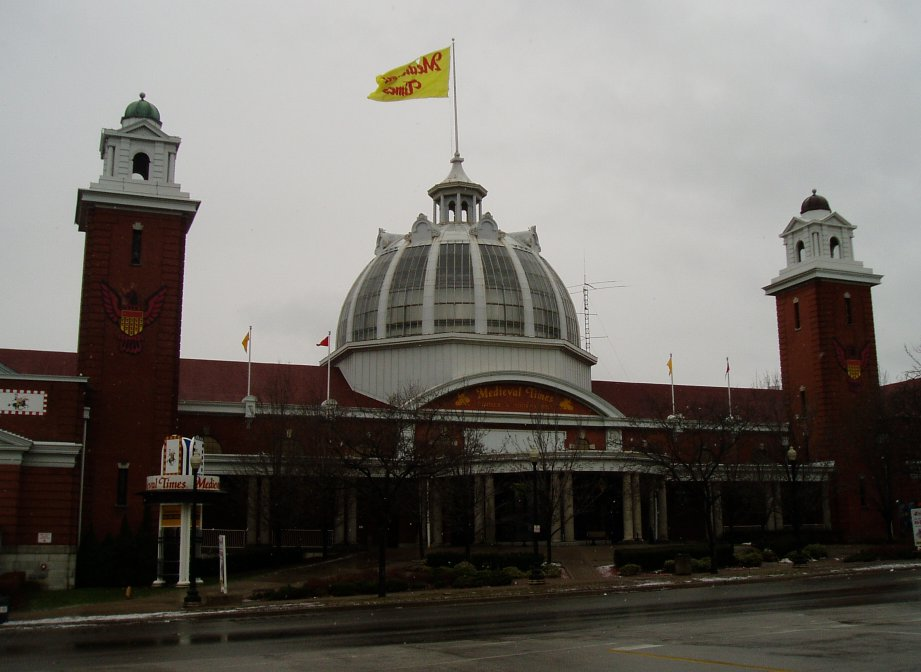
The exterior of the Government Building, which has been the Toronto location of Medieval Times since its debut at the 1993 CNE.

In the 1990s, an economic downturn and the leaving of the Blue Jays and Argonauts meant the City had no money to restore old buildings on the site. The Flyer, the Alpine Way and Exhibition Stadium were torn down and the National Trade Centre built. The Indy car race was introduced and Toronto has encouraged year-round use of Exhibition Place. Three of the westernmost former exhibit buildings are leased out for year-round attractions and are not part of the fair. The exhibit space was replaced by the new Enercare Centre. The 1993 the CNE opened with the grand opening of Medieval Times at the Government Building. The dinner theatre still operates in that building as of 2025.

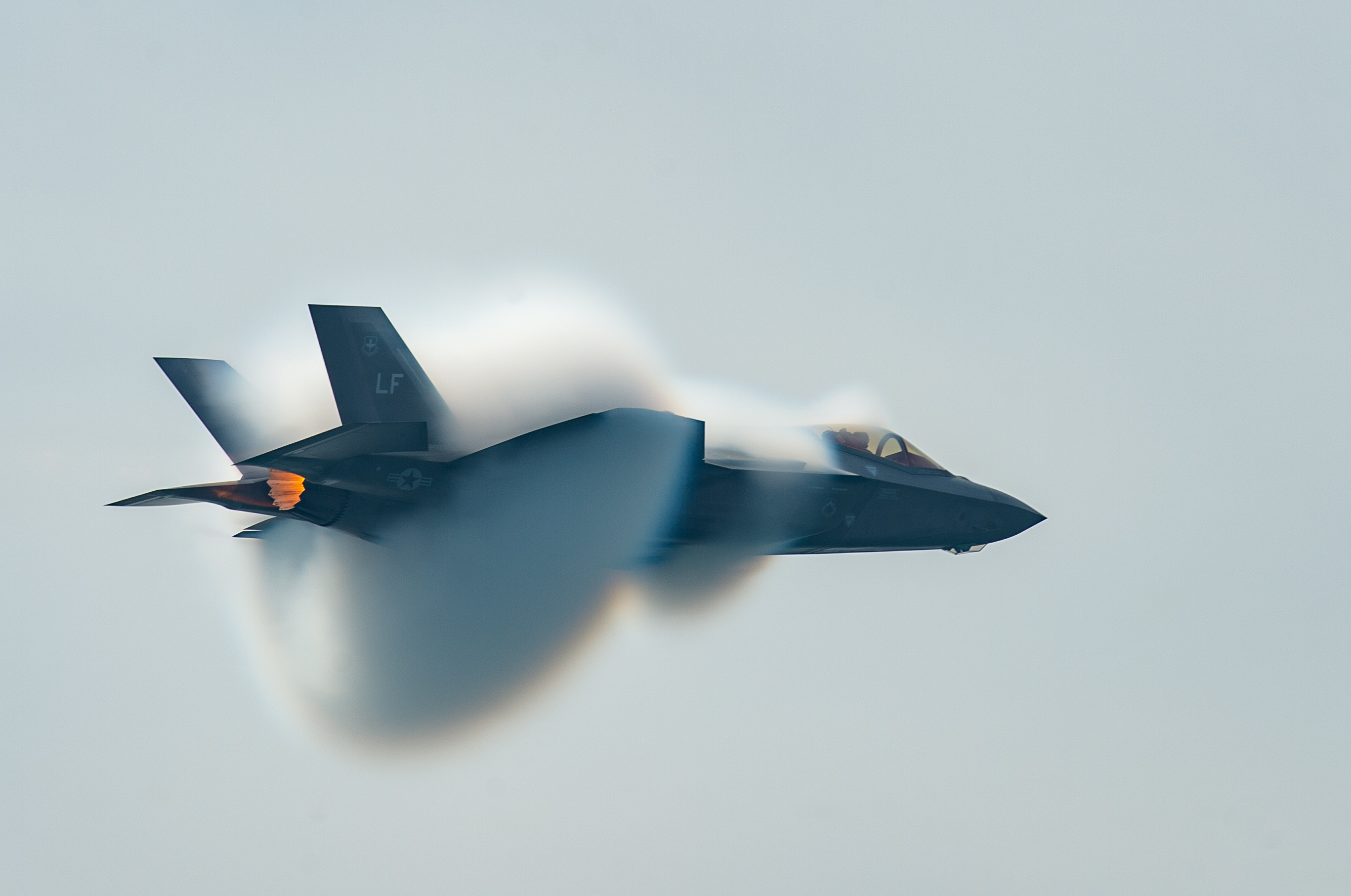
An F-35 Lightning II performs a high-speed pass during the 70th Canadian International Air Show, at the CNE.

In 2003, the CNE celebrated its 125th anniversary, despite the first four days of the exhibition being hampered by the Northeast blackout of 2003. In 2005, the CNE introduced a Mardi Gras parade. In 2010, the CNE received EcoLogo Certification, making it the 'greenest' fair in North America.

In the 2010s, the CNE added entertainment at the Coliseum. In 2012, Canadian Olympic gold-medalists Tessa Virtue and Scott Moir performed in La Vie: Aerial Acrobatics & Ice Skating Show during the first 15 days of the fair, and three-time World Champion and Olympic silver-medalist Elvis Stojko closed out the show on Labour Day weekend. In 2015, Virtue and Moir returned for another ice skating and aerial acrobatics show, Bon Voyage!

In both 2013 and 2014, the CNE featured a zip line ride. The ride launched from a ten-storey launch tower north of BMO Field. The landing tower, southwest of the current Enercare Centre, was 60 ft (18 m) high. The zip line ride consisted of four lines, each measuring nearly 1,100 ft (340 m). In 2016, the CNE saw the return of programming at the CNE waterfront with a daily water ski show, and national and international competitions. The same year also saw the introduction of the CNE Innovation Garage in partnership with Ryerson University, featuring a pitch competition for young inventors and displays of new inventions and projects such as ZooShare biogas.

The former baseball diamond at the very west of the site was replaced by a Toronto Raptors basketball practice facility. Baseball was moved outside of the site. The Dufferin Gate is no longer used as a point of entry to the fair. With funds from pro sports, BMO Field was built, which also necessitated the moving of the Hockey Hall of Fame downtown. In the south-west corner of the site, the Hotel X was built and the Automotive Building converted to year-round meeting space. These changes, while improving the financial position of Exhibition Place, have reduced the footprint of the fair further. In 2024, the CNE CEO raised concerns about the long-term viability of the fair with the ongoing changes to the site.

In 2020, the CNE and all associated in-person events were cancelled due to the COVID-19 pandemic—the first time the CNE has been cancelled since World War II. The CNE reported that this caused a loss of over $35 million in potential revenue, and $128 million in economic impact to Ontario. In 2021, due to the continued pandemic, the City of Toronto government cancelled all city-led and permitted outdoor in-person events through at least September 6, 2021, therefore cancelling the CNE for the second year in a row.

The CNE resumed operations in 2022. The re-opening on August 19, 2022, was made possible due to funding received from both the Government of Canada ($7.1 million) and the Province of Ontario ($1.6 million). The financial assistance facilitated the introduction of new innovative programming featuring immersive heritage exhibits, enhancements to the Gaming Garage powered by AMD, a reoccurring nightly drone show and a multimedia show called "NEVAEH & the Northstar", both presented by VinFast.

The 2023 CNE surpassed the 2015 attendance with 1,604,000 visitors passing through its gates. Attractions included the Fountain Show and the Canadian International Air Show on the waterfront. The Coliseum held an Ice Skating and Acrobatics Show "Time Flies" with Elvis Stojko. The Better Living Centre hosted a Pink Floyd exhibition. The bandshell's entertainment included Dionne Warwick, Jann Arden, Amanda Marshall, Kim Mitchell, Tynomi Banks and Kardinal Offishal. The CNE marked the 130th anniversary of the Ferris Wheel by welcoming the Super Wheel, the first of its kind to appear in Toronto. Fairgoers had views of the lake and the city, inside 36-climate controlled gondolas that held four to six guests per gondola.

== Economic impact ==
A 2017 Economic Impact Assessment, conducted by Enigma Research Corporation, reports that the Canadian National Exhibition (CNE) generates an estimated CA$93.1 million for Greater Toronto Area and more than $128.3 million for the province of Ontario each year.

A 2009 study by the same corporation showed that the 2009 CNE attracted more than 275,000 out-of-town visitors to the city, and that fair-related hiring created an equivalent of 633 full-year jobs in the region. Spending also supported CA$12.9 million of tax revenue to three levels of government. This national research initiative, commissioned by the Canadian Association of Fairs and Exhibitions (CAFE), was conducted at 20 fairs of varying sizes throughout Canada in 2008. A total of 1,200 people were interviewed during the 2008 Canadian National Exhibition alone.

Other highlights of the research, included a sample size of 1,200 people in on-site, face-to-face interviews, include:

- Local residents spend US$52 million related to the CNE
- The average non-local spent 2.5 nights in Toronto.

The CNE achieved a historical milestone in 2022, by returning after a two-year closure and attracted 1.56 million visitors to its grounds; generating significant economic impact nearly CA$112 million for the Greater Toronto Area and CA$142 million for the province of Ontario each year.

The CNE hires approximately 1,200 people starting in the spring of each year to assist in the planning and production of the annual fair. An additional 3,500 people are hired during the fair itself by CNE partners including Emergency Services, Toronto Police, Toronto Fire, food vendors, exhibitors and concessionaires. For many young people growing up in Toronto, the CNE is their first employment experience.

The CNEA partners with many corporate sponsors and provides a space for over 700 exhibitors. Both Canadian and international businesses contribute to the CNE. The CNEA works with several organizations to promote tourism to the Greater Toronto Area and the province of Ontario, including: Festivals and Events Ontario, Tourism Toronto and Attractions Ontario.

== Governance and organizational structure ==
The CNE is operated by the Canadian National Exhibition Association (CNEA) and its volunteer Board of Directors. The CNEA is governed under the jurisdiction of two Acts of the Province of Ontario: the Canadian National Exhibition Association Act, 2000, and the Agricultural and Horticultural Organizations Act, R.S.O. 1990, chapter A.9. Exhibition Place is owned by City of Toronto and is governed by the Board of Governors (BOG) of Exhibition Place.

Through various agreements with the City of Toronto, the CNEA operated as a program of the BOG until March 31, 2013. A Memorandum of Understanding (MOU) outlined the various administrative, financial and operational services to be provided to the CNEA by Exhibition Place. The MOU also provided for the use of the buildings and grounds for the annual CNE. During the decade leading up to independence, the CNEA contributed more than CA$20 million in site fees to the annual operating budget of the BOG, in addition to CA$7.3 million in operating surpluses. These contributions were included in consolidated annual financial results from the CNEA and BOG for the benefit of the City of Toronto.

The Board announced in 2012 that the CNEA would become an independent agency. Chair of the Board, City Councillor Mark Grimes stated: "The independence of the CNEA is good for both the CNEA and Exhibition Place. The agreement will protect the Board of Governors and the City against any negative financial consequences and at the same time allow the CNEA to reach financial and organizational stability for the newly independent organization." "It will be beneficial for the CNEA to be independent from the City of Toronto to be able to determine and implement consumer strategies and fiscal decisions that are made in the interest of the CNEA and its visitors, as experts within the fair business." As an independent organization, the CNEA will be able to retain its profits and re-invest in the fair. "'This is an extraordinary opportunity for the Canadian National Exhibition,' stated Brian Ashton, President of the Canadian National Exhibition Association (CNEA). 'We believe that as an independent business we can flourish and present an annual fair that will make Toronto and Canada proud!'" "Toronto City Council will be asked for approval of this new agreement at their March 5–6, 2012 meeting."

The new agreement was approved by Toronto City Council and the CNEA officially became independent on April 1, 2013. The CNEA is a non-share capital corporation and a tenant of Exhibition Place, to which it pays rent for the use of the grounds and buildings for the annual fair, as well as fees for operational services. The CNEA is not involved with year-round operations, events or development at Exhibition Place.

The CNEA has over 125 member individuals and associations representing each of the following sectors: Municipal, Manufacturers and Industry, Agriculture, and General and Liberal Arts. Member associations appoint a representative to the CNEA and approximately 15 members are appointed directly by the CNEA from the community-at-large. Each year a Board of Directors is elected from this membership, giving equal representation to each section. Six representatives of the Municipal section are appointed by Toronto City Council.

In March 2022, the Canadian National Association (CNEA) announced that Darrell Brown was appointed as Chief Executive Office (CEO) of the CNEA. President Suzan Hall explained "Darrell Brown has been central to the stabilization of our organization, having secured substantial funding from both the Government of Canada and the Province of Ontario that has enabled the CNEA to survive". Darrell Brown has worked as a consultant, legal adviser, and entrepreneur over the five decades of his career. He has practised law and consulting on employee benefits issues in Canada, lead international development projects and created acclaimed art exhibitions. Brown was fired as CEO as in 2025 following harassment allegations. Former MP Mark Holland was named CEO later that year.

=== Current Board of Directors ===
May 2023 to Spring 2024 Term

Executive Committee:

President	Suzan Hall
Honorary President	John Kiru
1st Vice President	Randy Bauslaugh
Vice President	Darryl Kaplan
Vice President Section 1	Councillor Stephen Holyday
Vice President Section 2	Helen Wojcinski

Directors
Past Presidents	Honorary President
Brian Ashton	John Kiru
Jim Melvin
Section 1 - Municipal	Section 2 - Manufacturers & Industry
Mayor Olivia Chow	Suzan Hall
Councillor Paul Ainslie	Celeste Kirk
Deputy Mayor Stephen Holyday	Andrew Mifsud
Councillor Ausma Malik	Ted Papadatos
Councillor Nick Mantas	Lyle Shipley
Councillor Chris Moise	Helen Wojcinski
Section 3 - Agriculture	Section 4 - General & Liberal Arts
Susan Antler	Randy Bauslaugh
Parry Chao	Mark Stephens
Darryl Kaplan	Michael Wallace
Domenic Lunardo	Jennifer Ward
Lyle Shipley	Janice Warren

== See also ==
- List of festivals in Canada
- List of festivals in Ontario
- List of festivals in Toronto
