= Canada's a Drag =

Canadian documentary series about drag queens

- Season 1 cover art
- Created by: CBC Arts
- Country of origin: Canada
- Original language: English
- No. of seasons: 4
- No. of episodes: 37

Original release
- Network: CBC Gem
- Release: March 7, 2018 – present

Canada's a Drag is a Canadian documentary series that premiered on CBC Gem on March 7, 2018. The show was created by Peter Knegt and Mercedes Grundy. Each episode focuses on a drag performer from a different Canadian city, inclusive of drag queens, drag kings and transgender or non-binary performers. It is produced by CBC Arts.

The series won the Canadian Screen Award for Best Original Non-Fiction Web Program or Series two years in a row at the 8th Canadian Screen Awards and 9th Canadian Screen Awards.

== Featured drag performers ==
=== Season One (2018) ===
1. Allysin Chaynes - Toronto
2. Lourdes the Merry Virgin - Edmonton
3. Berlin Stiller (now The Girlfriend Experience) - Vancouver
4. Gay Jesus - Toronto
5. Prairie Sky - Winnipeg
6. Sofonda Cox - Toronto
7. Guizo LaNuit - Montreal
8. Elle Noir - Halifax
9. Tranie Tronic - Montreal

=== Season Two (2019) ===
1. Alma Bitches - Vancouver
2. Icesis Couture and Savannah Couture - Ottawa
3. Tynomi Banks - Toronto
4. Duke Carson - Calgary
5. Crystal Slippers - Montreal
6. Irma Gerd - St. John's
7. Yovska - Toronto
8. Pharaoh Moans - Winnipeg
9. Eddi Licious - Victoria
10. Manghoe Lassi - Toronto
11. Jenna Telz - Kelowna
12. Quanah Style - Vancouver

=== Season Three (2020) ===
1. MX Wolverine - Ottawa
2. Francheska Dynamites - Lethbridge
3. Rose Butch - Vancouver
4. Chiquita Mére - Moncton
5. Charli Deville - Montreal
6. Sapphoria - Edmonton
7. Fay Slift & Fluffy Soufflé - Toronto
8. Shay Dior - Vancouver
9. Vivian Vanderpuss - Victoria
10. Mikiki - Toronto

=== Season Four (2024) ===
1. Miss Juwanna Dewitt - Toronto
2. Anita Landback - Halifax
3. Minor Disappointment - Vancouver
4. Manny Dingo - Toronto
5. Hot Wheelz - Edmonton
6. Jaylene Tyme - Vancouver

== Further appearances ==
Multiple performers have gone on to be featured notably in film and television series after their appearances on Canada's a Drag.

From season one:

- Berlin Stiller (now The Girlfriend Experience) competed on season four of Canada's Drag Race (2023-24).

From season two:

- Icesis Couture won season two of Canada's Drag Race (2021) and competed on season one of Canada's Drag Race: Canada vs. the World (2022).
- Tynomi Banks competed on season one of Canada's Drag Race (2020) and season two of Canada vs. the World (2024).
- Irma Gerd competed on season three of Canada's Drag Race (2022).
- Yovska competed on season three of The Boulet Brothers' Dragula (2019) and season one of The Boulet Brothers' Dragula: Titans (2022).

From season three

- Vivian Vanderpuss competed on season three of Canada's Drag Race (2022).
- Francheska Dynamites was the subject of a full-length documentary film: Francheska: Prairie Queen (2022).
- Fay Slift and Fluffy Soufflé began starring in their own children's television series The Fabulous Show with Fay and Fluffy (since 2022).

From season four

- Jaylene Tyme competed on the fifth season of Canada's Drag Race (2024-25).
