= Labour Day Parade (Toronto) =

Annual event

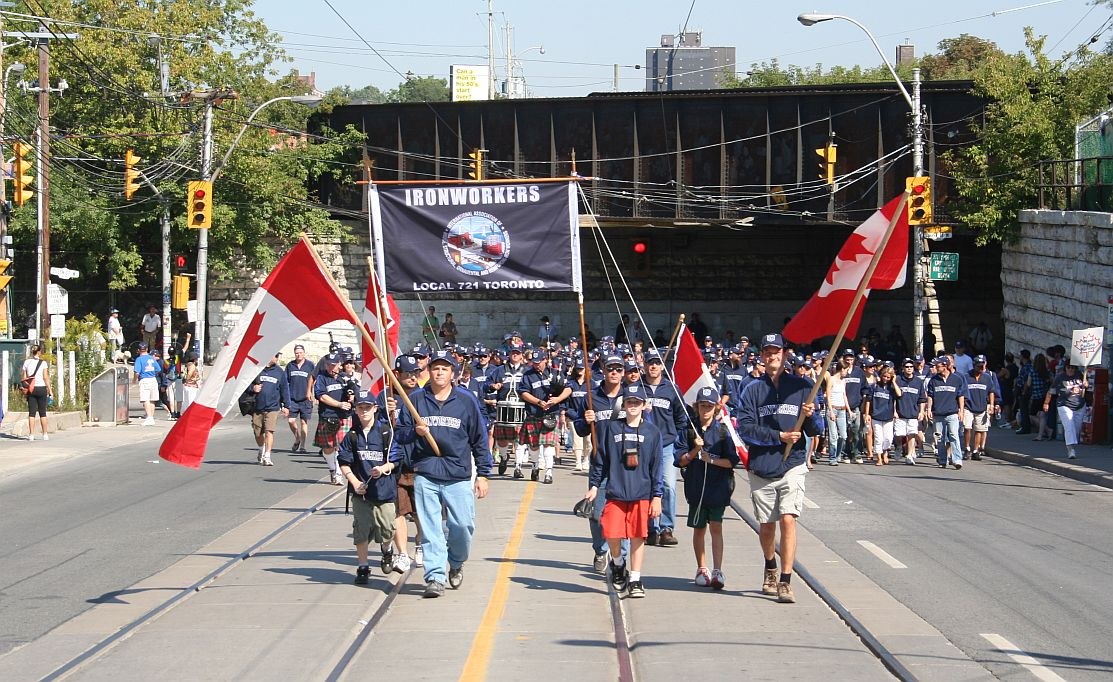
An ironworkers union at the 2008 Toronto Labour Day Parade.

The Toronto Labour Day Parade is an annual event held in the city of Toronto. The parade is organized by the Toronto & York Region Labour Council following a route down University Avenue, then west along Queen Street West then proceeding down Dufferin Street entering the Canadian National Exhibition via the Dufferin Gate.

The first parade was held in December 1872 and was organized by what was then the Toronto Trades and Labour Assembly and staged in support of the Toronto Typographical Union's strike for a 58-hour work-week. Twenty-seven unions joined the parade to demonstrate in support of the Typographical Union who had been on strike since March 25. The Toronto Trades and Labour Council (successor to the TTA) subsequently held similar celebrations every spring. On July 23, 1894, Canadian Prime Minister John Thompson's government made Labour Day an official holiday, moving it to the first Monday of September. Subsequent parades have been held on this date.
