= Princes' Gates =

Triumphal arch in Toronto, Ontario, Canada

- Triumphal arch
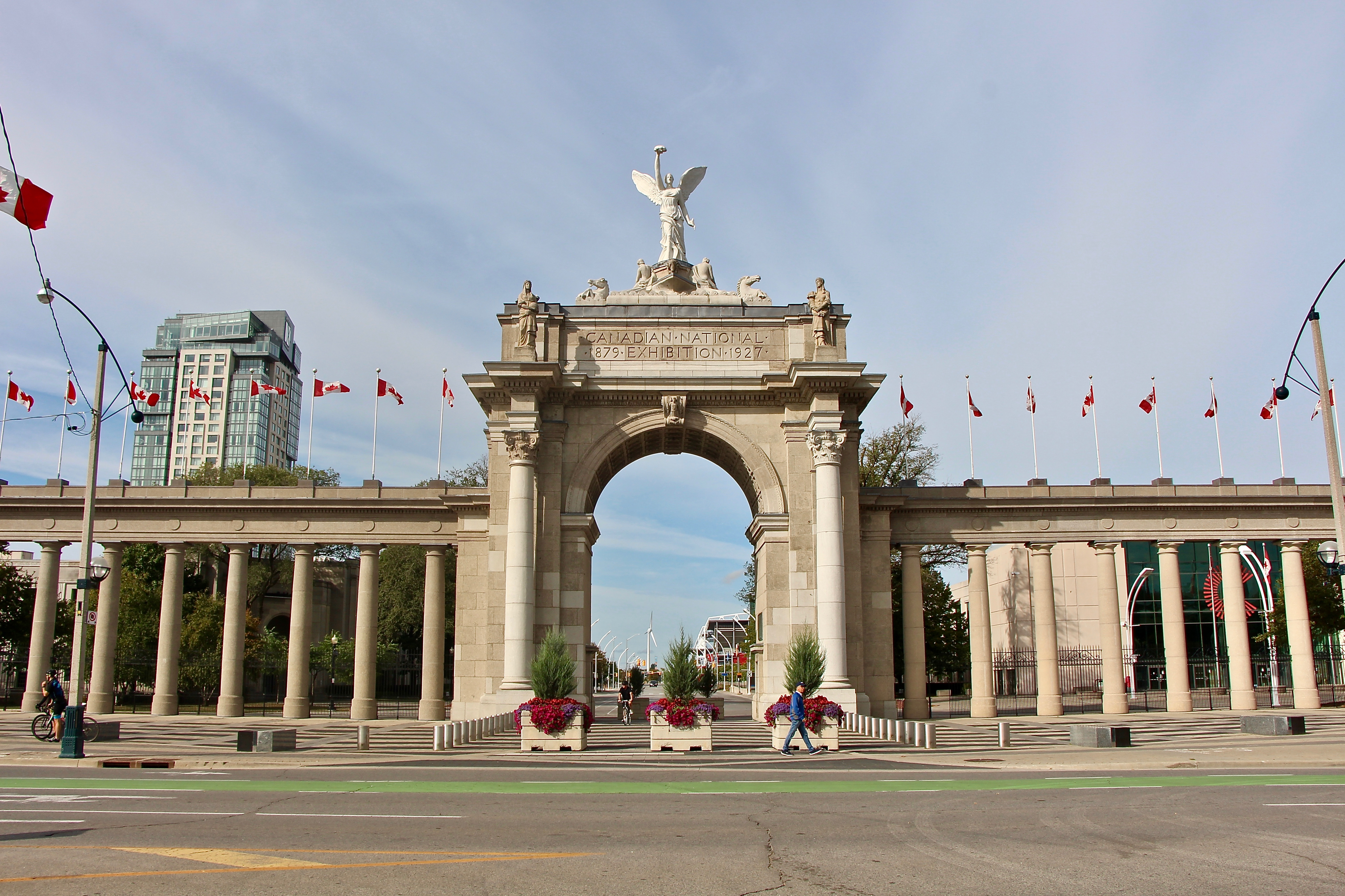
- Princes' Gates from Strachan Avenue in 2020
- Design: Chapman and Oxley
- Builder: Sullivan and Fried
- Constructed: April–August 1927
- Opened: August 30, 1927
- Cost: CA$152,240
- Height: 20 metres (65 ft)
- Length: 110 metres (350 ft)
- Dimensions: Wide: 45 metres (148 ft); Deep: 22 metres (72 ft)
- Architectural style: Neoclassical
- Owner: Municipal government of Toronto
- Address: 2 Strachan Avenue; Toronto, Ontario, Canada
- Location of Princes' Gates in Toronto
- Coordinates: 43°38′5″N 79°24′34″W

Ontario Heritage Act
- Designated: 15 June 1987

The Princes' Gates is a triumphal arch and a monumental gateway at Exhibition Place in Toronto, Ontario, Canada. Made out of cement and stone, the triumphal arch is flanked by colonnades on both of its sides, with curved pylons at both ends. The 350-foot-long (110 m) structure serves as the eastern gateway to the Canadian National Exhibition, an annual agricultural and provincial fair held at Exhibition Place.

The Princes' Gates was initially conceived in the 1920s, forming part of a larger redevelopment effort of the eastern portions of Exhibition Place. Work began on Princes' Gates in April 1927, and was completed several months later in August. The structure was initially planned to be named the Diamond Jubilee of Confederation Gates, with its opening coinciding with the 60th anniversary of Canadian Confederation. However, the structure was named Princes' Gates, after Edward, Prince of Wales and Prince George were scheduled to officially open the new structure. The structure was officially opened by the two princes on August 30, 1927. Since its completion, the structure has undergone several restorations. In 1987, the municipal government named Princes' Gates as a "structure of architectural and historic interest" under the Ontario Heritage Act.

== History ==
The Canadian National Exhibition (CNE) was established in 1879 at the foot of Dufferin Street, leasing the western-most portion of the Military Reserve attached to the Toronto Garrison. Over time, the CNE expanded eastward and took over more of the Reserve. By the 1920s, it was now looking to expand to the easternmost section of the Reserve site at the foot of Strachan Avenue. In 1924, the Chapman and Oxley architectural firm was contracted to make a 50-year development plan for the eastern portions of the Exhibition Grounds (now known as "Exhibition Place"); including the Princes' Gates. Princes' Gates was initially intended to serve as the main entrance to a walled park; Additionally, Princes' Gates was intended to serve as the grand entrance for the Exhibition Grounds and the CNE; with the primary entrance to the CNE before 1927 being situated at Dufferin Gate, at the west-end of the Exhibition Grounds. Alfred Chapman of Chapman and Oxley was contracted as the lead designer of the east-side entrance in 1926.

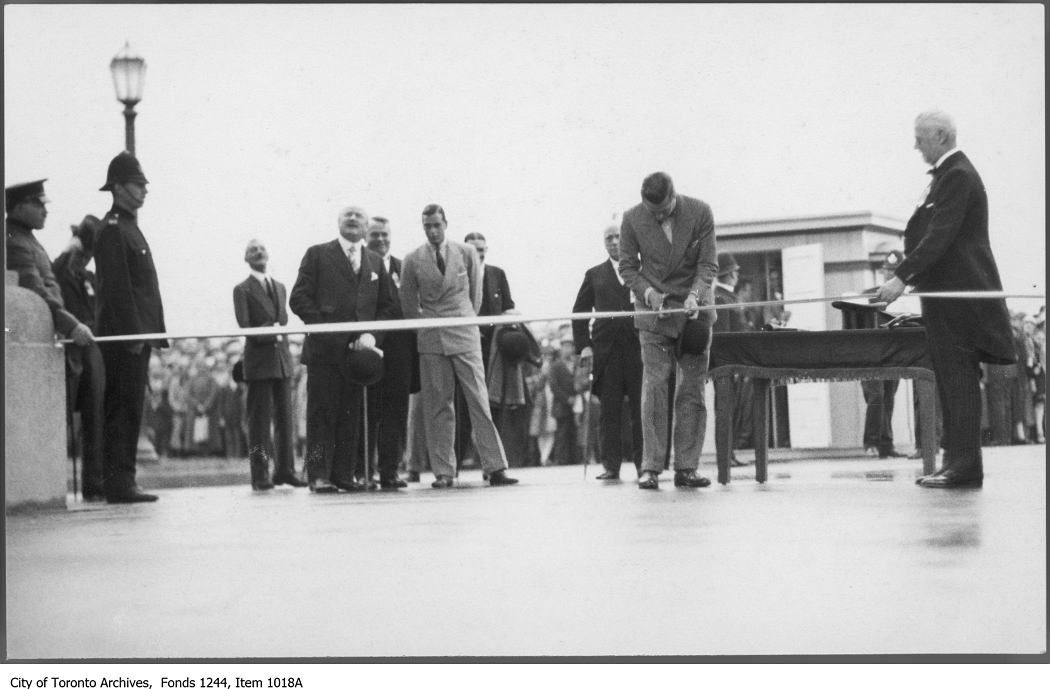
Edward, Prince of Wales cutting the ribbon to officially open Princes' Gates

Inspiration for the design of Princes' Gates came from other British and French triumphal arches that Chapman visited while visiting western Europe for the 1925 British Empire Exhibition. Although plans for Princes' Gates were conceived in the early 1920s construction of the structure did not take place until 1927. A municipal referendum was held on January 1, 1927, to approve the construction of the triumphal arch and a boulevard that would lead to it at the cost of CA$363,000 ($6.55 million in 2025 dollars). Construction for the triumphal arches took place later that year, from April 14 to August 30, with the structure itself costing approximate CA$152,240 ($2.75 million in 2025 dollars). Strachan Avenue was straightened and extended south in front of Princes' Gates to Lake Shore Boulevard during the same period that Princes' Gates was being built.

With construction taking place on the 60th anniversary of Canadian Confederation, the triumphal arch was first known as the Diamond Jubilee of Confederation Gates. However, Edward, Prince of Wales (later King Edward VIII) and Prince George, Duke of Kent were later scheduled to open the triumphal arches as a part of their royal tour of Canada in 1927, resulting in the triumphal arches to be renamed Princes' Gates on August 5, 1927, after the two princes. Princes' Gates was officially opened to the public on August 30, 1927 by the Prince of Wales with a pair of golden scissors, accompanied by the Duke of Kent. A procession of veterans then passed through the gate, followed by the royal party. Since the Princes' Gates were opened in 1927, a procession of veterans has marched through the arch for the annual Warriors' Day Parade held at the CNE. Nearly a year later, on August 28, 1928, a plaque commemorating the unveiling of Princes' Gates by the two princes was installed on the structure.

In 1957, the first signs of deterioration of the structure appeared. There were concerns that the statue would fall to the ground. "That's an angel on top of the gates and when the angels aren't safe, nobody's safe" according to Alderman Bert Cranham. The Parks Department completed some minor restoration work.

In 1977, on the 50th anniversary of Princes' Gates opening, a commemorative plaque was unveiled just inside the gate by the Ontario Heritage Foundation. The historical plaque was unveiled by W. B. Sullivan, one of the original builders of the structure. A decade later, on June 15, 1987, the municipal government of Toronto named Princes' Gates as a structure of architectural and historic interest, as authorized by the Ontario Heritage Act.

In 2006, the piazza around the base of the structure was renovated at a cost of CA$2 million, providing better pedestrian and cycling amenities. The renovations also includes stylized marble benches, two-tone granite pavers, and embedded reflectors to augment the lighting used to illuminate the structure at night. A design firm from Milan was selected to head the Princes' Gates piazza renovations; with the idea to renovate the piazza of the sculpture having been initiated after several Toronto-based design firms went to Milan, a sister city of Toronto, to design several piazzas in that city. Improvements to Strachan Avenue were also made during these renovations, in order to better facilitate pedestrian traffic travelling from the roadway to Exhibition Place.

The Princes' Gates underwent further restorations in 2010, as a part of a CA$27.3 million project to restore and improve several buildings at the CNE. The restoration was funded by the Government of Canada.

== Design ==
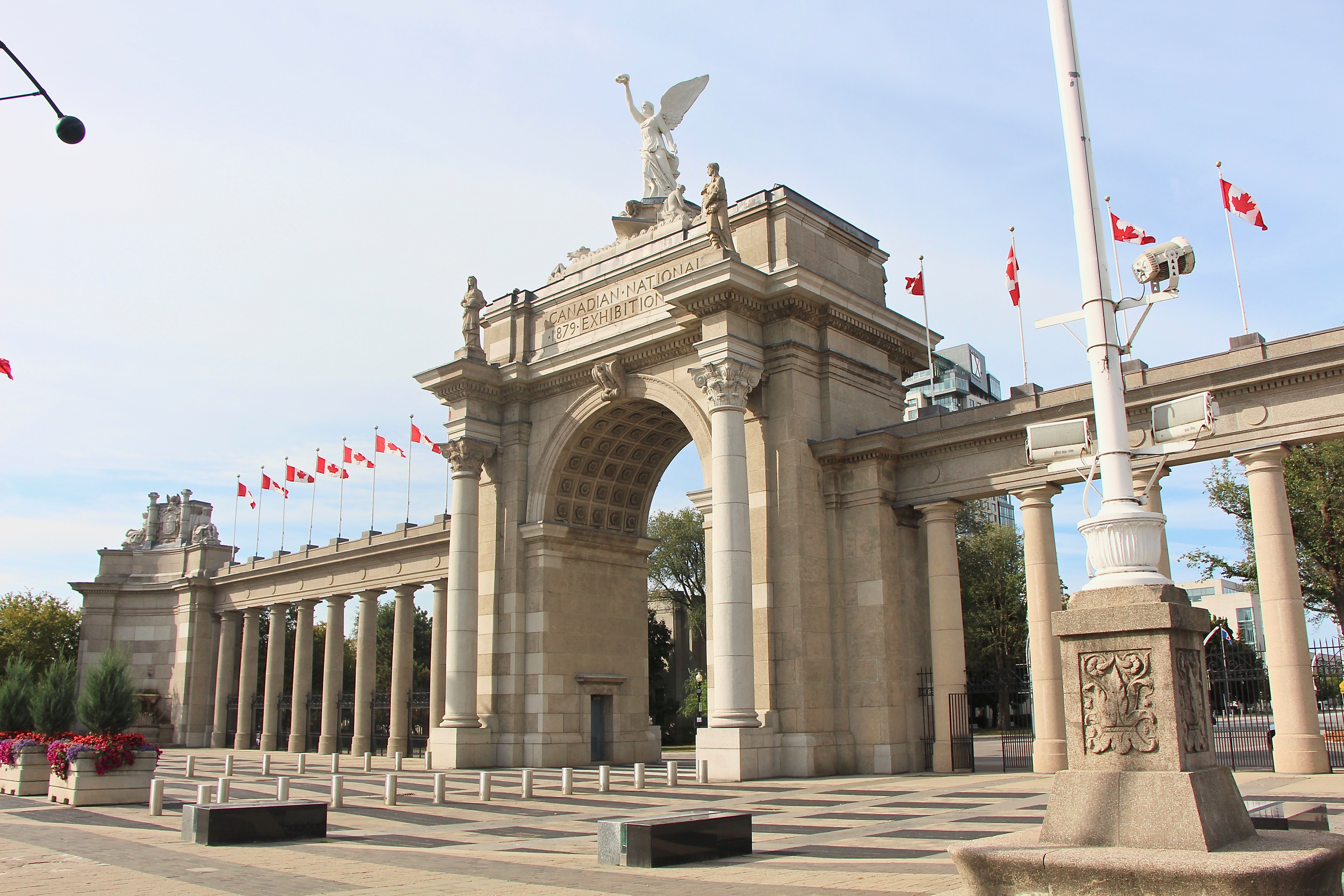
The triumphal arch is flanked on both its sides by colonnades

The architectural firm Chapman and Oxley designed Princes' Gates, with Alfred Chapman named as the project's lead designer. Construction of the building was contracted to Sullivan and Fried. The structure was completed in 1927 and was later restored in 2010. The structure's north-side colonnades were also replaced in 2004.

The classically-designed structure includes a single Roman-styled arch made out of cement and stone; with two detached Corinthian columns, flanked on its side by colonnades made of nine Doric columns surmounted by plinths with flags atop them. The nine columns in both colonnades represent the nine provinces that existed in Canada at that time. (Note: When the structure was completed, Canada only had nine provinces. Newfoundland and Labrador joined Canadian Confederation in 1949, more than 20 years after the structure was completed.) Curved pylons are placed at the ends of the colonnades, with fountains built at the base of the pylons. The coat of arms of Ontario is placed directly above the fountains on the pylons at the ends of the structure. Imitations of the central sculpture were originally intended to flank to the coat of arms, although these figures were replaced in later designs with ones representing the industries of Ontario. Two miniature Ionic columns that flank the coat of arms were also added to the final design. All together, the structure is approximately 110-metre-long (350 ft).

Several inscriptions exist on the structure, the largest reading "Canadian National Exhibition 1879 1927," at the front of the Roman-styled arch. Another inscription commemorating the gate's opening by the Prince of Wales and Duke of Kent exists on the inside wall of the central arch. The top of the structure is accessible from a ladder in a room within the north side of the arch that holds a transformer.

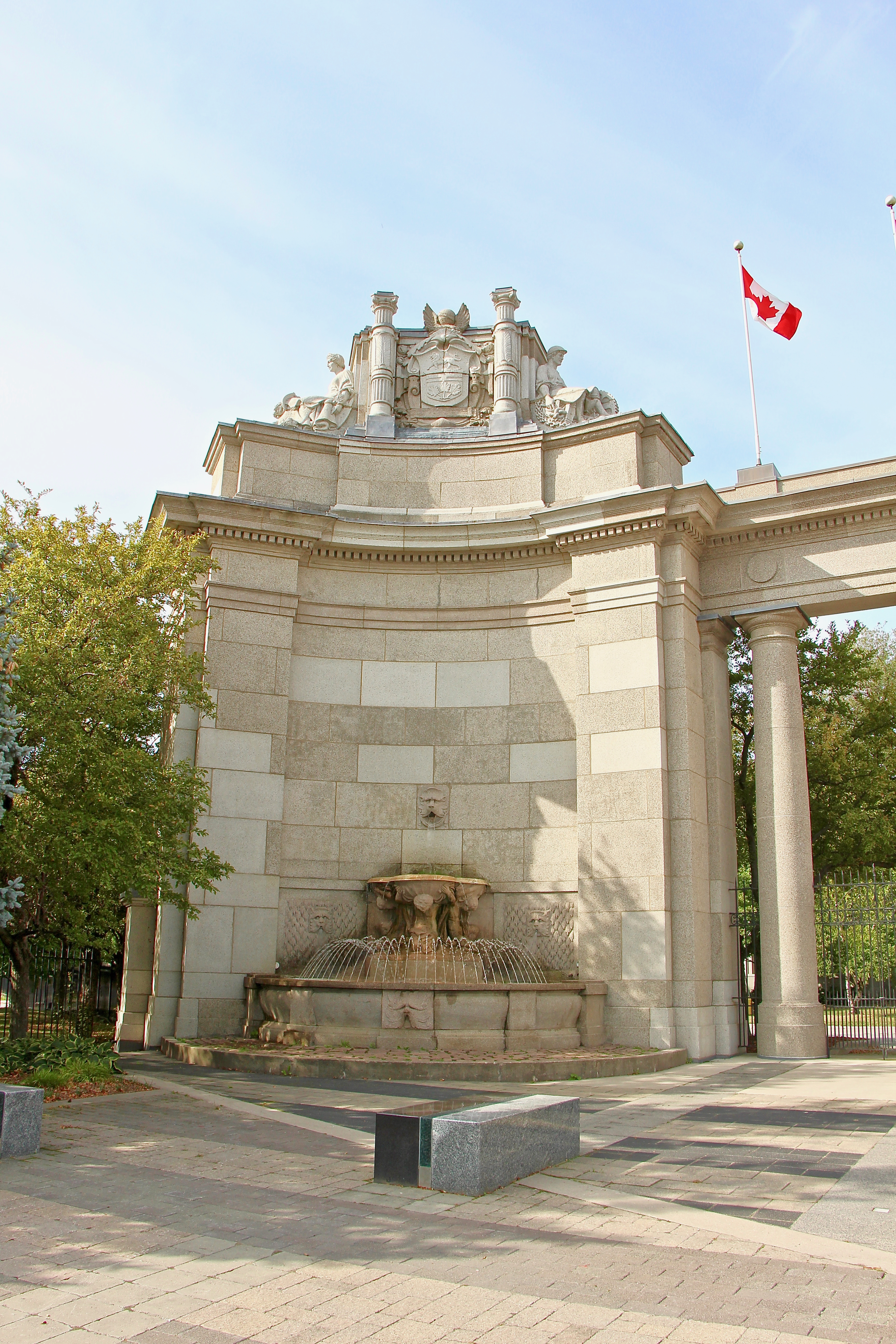
The curved pylon at the end of the structure's southern colonnade

The image of the Princes' Gates has been adopted by the Canadian National Exhibition Association as an official mark of the group; with the association having made past objections against the unauthorized use of the triumphal arch for promotional purposes.

=== Sculptures ===
A number of sculptures are also present on the structure. The structure's original sculptures were made from moulds which were filled with cement and chipped stone, with the mould later finished off by hand. All sculptures on the structure were sculpted by Charles Duncan McKechnie. As McKechnie worked closely with Chapman on a day-to-day basis over the design of the structure, there exists no record of the discussions that took place concerning the symbolism of the sculptures. The method which McKechnie used to produce the figures resulted in sculptures that were more-susceptible to the effects of weather; resulting in their refurbishment on several occasions. The sculptures were first refurbished in 1957 when it was sandblasted and patched with cement; in 1977 and 1987 for the structure's 50th and 60th anniversaries.

A 7.3 metres (24 ft) statue stands on top of the Roman-styled arches. Referred to as Wing Victory, its design was modified several times during the structure's design phase. It has been suggested that the sculpture was modelled after the Winged Victory of Samothrace. However, the design was later modified to showcase the figure raising one arm in the air; holding a laurel in the outstretched arm and a maple leaf in the other. The statue weighs approximately 12 tons. The original central sculpture on the arch was removed as a part of the 1987 restorations, and replaced with a polymer-resin replica in order to forestall potential accidents involving the original deteriorating sculpture. Winged Victory stands on a pedestal shaped like a vessel, evoking the metaphor the Ship of State. The outstretched arms of the central sculpture and the structure's colonnades evoking the idea of unified Canada. The central figure is flanked by hippocampuses and two subsidiary male sculptures seated on the gunwales and facing backwards.

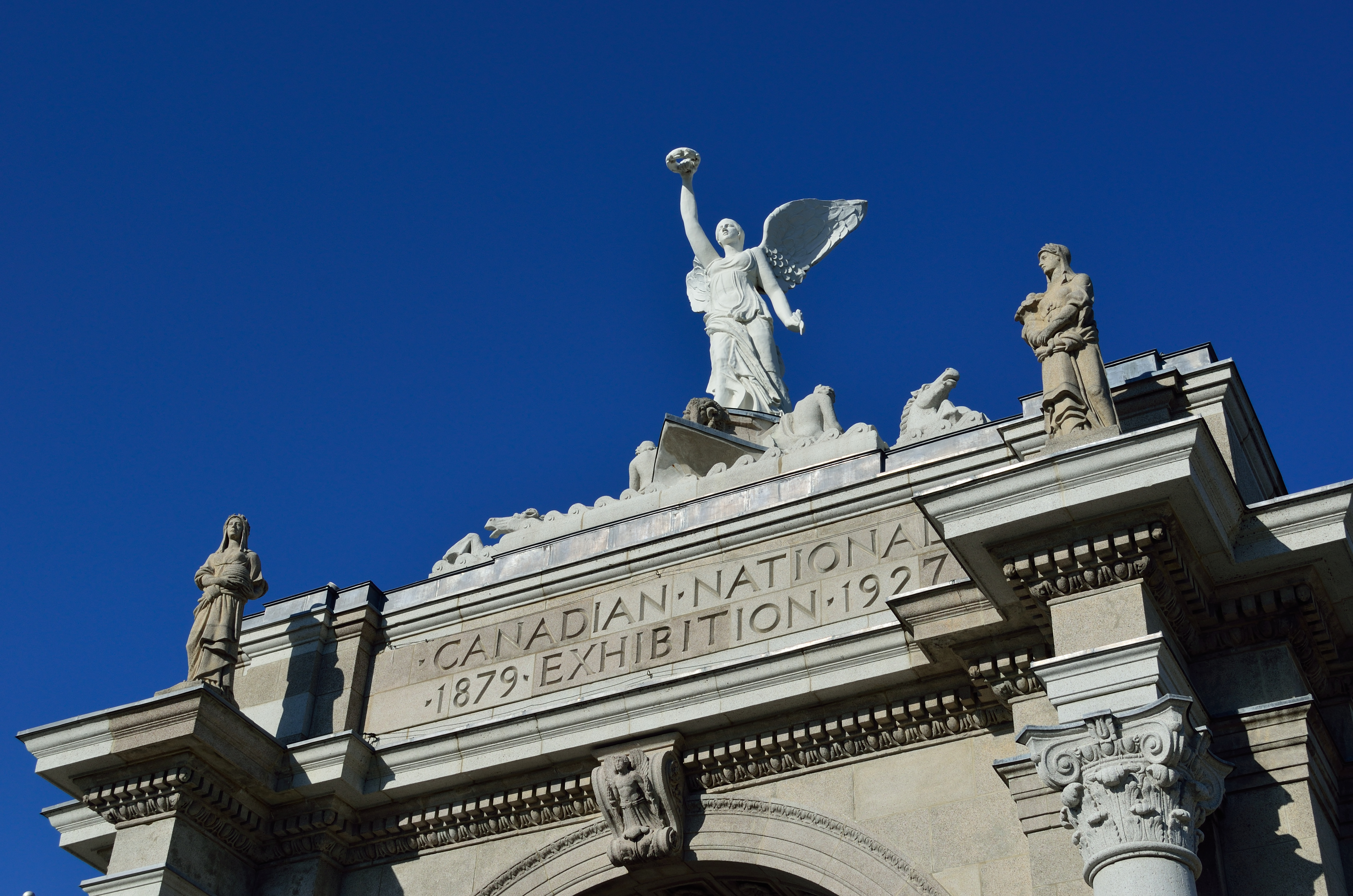
Several sculptures were incorporated into the design of the structure

Two pairs of identical sculptures are situated at the front and back corners of the Roman-styled arch, holding two beehives and two cornucopias. The figures are believed to represent the produce and industries available in Canada at the time they were sculpted. These four statues were also recast in 1994 using the same materials as the originals. Male and female figures were also placed on the pylons at the ends of the structure.

== See also ==
- List of post-Roman triumphal arches
