= Francheska Dynamites =

Filipino-Canadian drag queen

Francis "Kiko" Yutrago, known by the stage name Francheska Dynamites, is a Filipino-Canadian care worker and drag performer who was featured in the third season of Canada's a Drag and the subject of the 2022 documentary film Francheska: Prairie Queen which premiered at the Calgary International Film Festival.

== Career ==
Along with working as a drag performer and care worker in a nursing home he also works in the fast food industry and in janitorial services.

In drag he has won multiple pageantry titles including Miss Fiesta Filipino Queen in 2019, Miss Dame of Progress in 2019, Miss Queen Philippines Canada in 2018, Queen of Canada The pageant-Tourism 2023. She was also the first drag queen from Lethbridge to be a finalist of Alberta's Next Drag Superstar.

He was one of the Canadian drag performers featured in the third season of the CBC Gem series Canada's a Drag in 2020. He was the subject of director Laura Lynn O'Grady's documentary Francheska: Prairie Queen which follows Yutrago as he works as a care worker and drag queen in Lethbridge, Alberta to support his family in The Philippines after a typhoon hits their home. It also follows Yutrago and his fiancé as he prepares to compete in a pageant as Francheska.

== Personal life ==
Yutrago was born in The Philippines and later immigrated to Canada in 2010 under the live-in caregiver program. He works to pay for his mother's medication, his brother's tuition, and to support his family in The Philippines.

Yutrago's drag name comes from people in The Philippines teasing him by changing his name from masculine Francis to feminine Francheska. His drag persona is inspired by Beyoncé and other R&B artists.

As of 2020 Yutrago lives in Stirling, Alberta with fiancé Cody, and commonly performs in Lethbridge.
