= Yovska =

Drag performer

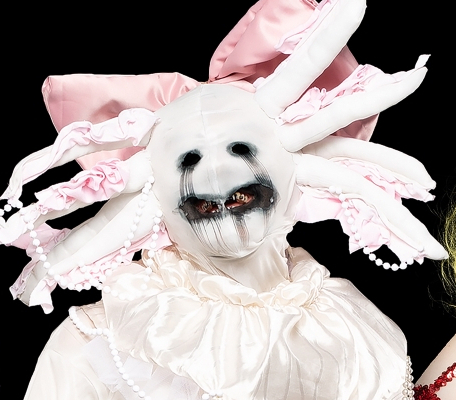
- Yovska in promotional artwork for the third season of The Boulet Brothers' Dragula, 2019
- Born: Yovska Martinez Moreno; Mexico
- Education: OCAD University
- Occupation: Drag performer

Yovska Martinez Moreno, known professionally as Yovska, is a Mexican-Canadian drag performer, ball performer, social media personality, and artist who was featured in the CBC Gem docu-series Canada's a Drag. They also competed in the third season of The Boulet Brothers' Dragula and the first season of The Boulet Brothers' Dragula: Titans.

== Early life and education ==
Yovksa was born in Mexico and immigrated to Canada when they were seven. They graduated from OCAD University in Toronto in 2018 with a degree in Material Art and Design.

== Career ==
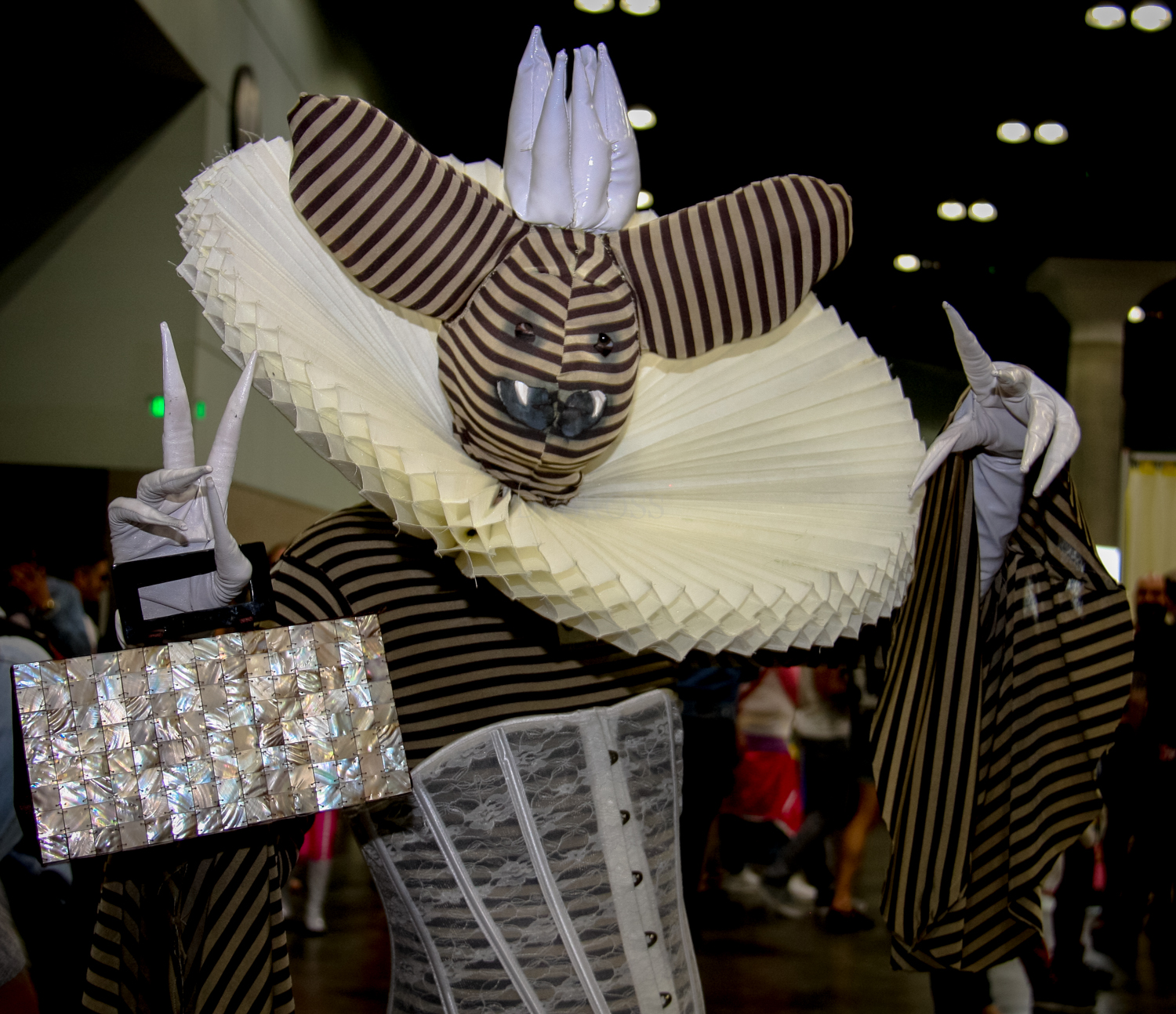
Yovska at RuPaul's DragCon LA, 2019

Yovska's first exposure to drag was by watching The Rocky Horror Picture Show in high school, and was further influenced to begin drag after watching Conchita Wurst perform "Rise Like a Phoenix" at the 2014 Eurovision Song Contest. Yovska started their drag career in the Kiki Ballroom alliance in Toronto, specifically with the Kiki House of Siriano headed by Twysted Siriano. They walked primarily in the 'Bizarre' category, where as of 2019 they had an undefeated record. They were granted Legendary Status in the Kiki ballroom, one of 13 legends.

In 2019 Yovska was featured in an episode of the second season of Canada's a Drag. They were later announced as a contestant on the third season of The Boulet Brother's Dragula, becoming the first Canadian to appear on the show. They were eliminated in the third episode following the Monsters of Rock challenge. They later returned as one of the contestants on the Dragula spin-off The Boulet Brothers' Dragula: Titans. The series featured monsters from the first four seasons of Dragula for a second chance. They were eliminated in the second episode.

In 2020, during the COVID-19 pandemic, Yovska was among the performers in Queer Pride Inside, an online event hosted by Elvira Kurt in collaboration with CBC Gem and Buddies in Bad Times.

=== Twitch streaming ===
Yovska maintains an active presence on Twitch, streaming three times a week. Their streams feature a variety of content, including gameplay sessions of Identity V both in and out of drag, as well as "Get Ready with Me" segments and sewing streams where they craft outfits. Additionally, Yovska hosts an annual birthday stream, creating a dynamic platform for fans to engage with their favorite artist in real-time. In 2023 Yovska performed at TwitchCon's Drag Showcase in Las Vegas.

== Personal life ==
Yovska uses the pronouns she/her and they/them. They name their artistic influences as Leigh Bowery, Malice Mizer, Klaus Nomi, Nintendo, and mascot horror video games such as Five Nights at Freddy's and Poppy Playtime.

== Filmography ==
Year	Title	Role	Notes
2019	Canada's a Drag	Themself	1 episode
2019	The Boulet Brothers' Dragula	Themself	Contestant (season 3)
2022	The Boulet Brothers' Dragula: Titans	Themself	Contestant (season 1)
