= Warriors' Day Parade =

Parade in Toronto, Ontario, Canada

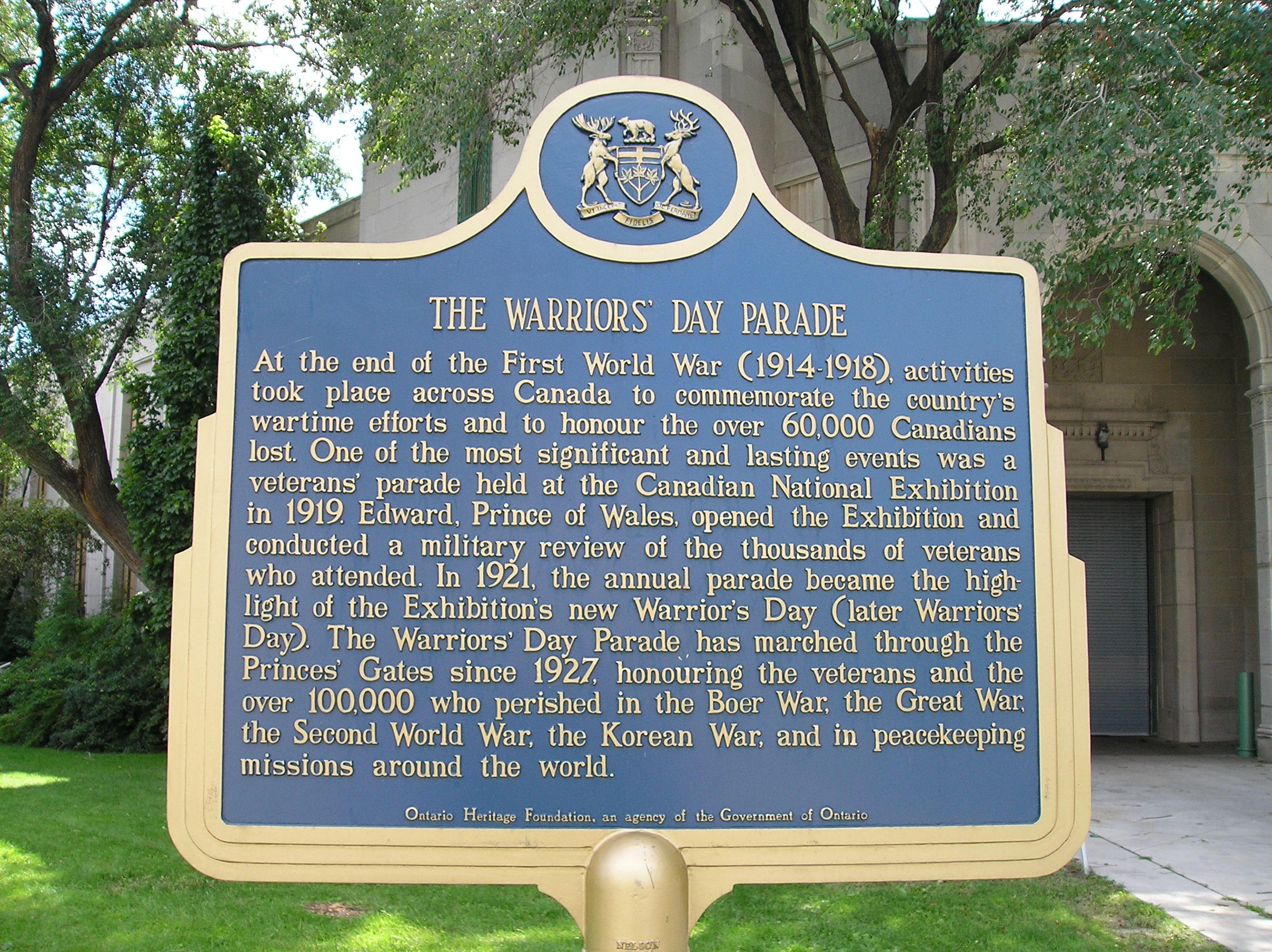
- Commemorative plaque describing the Warriors' Day Parade
- Genre: Military
- Locations: Toronto, Ontario
- Years active: 1921–present
- Founded: 1921
- Attendance: 3,000 (2019)
- Patron: Warriors' Day Council

The Warriors' Day Parade is an annual military parade in Toronto, Ontario, Canada. It is open to Canadian war veterans, military personnel, first responders and para military marching contingents and bands. Warriors'Day was inaugurated 26 August 1919 by Edward, Prince of Wales at the Canadian National Exhibition. The parade was established in 1921 by Governor General of Canada Julian Byng, and is organised by the Warriors' Day Parade Council. The parade is held on the third or fourth Saturday of August and marks the beginning of the Canadian National Exhibition. The parade honours the service of Canadian men and women in the armed forces.

The parade route begins at the Princes' Gates, travels along Princes' Boulevard and ends at the Stanley Barracks. Veterans are organized by their units, wars and demonstrations. Veterans are welcomed from Canada and the United States. The Warriors' Day Parade Council awards organizations that participate. The parade is often planned to commemorate specific events such as notable battles.

Following the world wars, participants in the parade included up to 30,000 military veterans. In 2019, the number of veterans participating was estimated at just below 3,000. A number of privately owned military vehicles and classic cars also take part in the parade, representing various military vehicle preservation associations.

In conjunction with the parade, the Toronto Transit Commission (TTC) waives transit fares for the day for Canadian Armed Forces personnel, veterans and companions. The TTC Honour Guard also participates in the parade. Similarly, GO Transit also offers free travel for the day of the parade to veterans and current personnel.

== History ==
The Exhibition grounds were originally part of the Military Reserve and the relationship between the exhibition was established early. The CNE had been hosting military parades and demonstrations beginning in 1879 to honour military veterans. One notable veterans' day took place at the CNE on August 27, 1919. Veterans of the Great War were given free rein of the grounds until the afternoon, when they attended a baseball game on the Toronto Island. In the evening, the veterans returned to the fair grounds to be reviewed by Edward, Prince of Wales who was visiting Toronto and be entertained by a special show at the Grandstand. It was estimated that 115,000 persons attended the CNE that day, including 30,000 veterans, some of the battleship HMS Renown.

The Warriors' Day parade council was formed in Toronto in 1921, extending the work of the CNE. The council desired a specific day to pay tribute to living veterans of the First World War. Council declared "Warriors' Day" and in the early years, it was the first day of the Exhibition.

The first Warriors' Day parade was held on August 27, 1921. The parade started at Trinity Bellwoods Park, (then the site of Trinity College) and followed Queen Street and Dufferin Street south to the Exhibition grounds. Governor General Lord Byng, the former Commander of the Canadian Corps at the Battle of Vimy Ridge, took the salute of the veterans in the afternoon. To those present whom he had commanded at Vimy Ridge: "Byng Boys, I wish you luck. I do not say that because it is the ordinary thing to say to you. I say it to you from the bottom of my heart. I wish you luck in your pleasures, in your work, in your homes, whatever you are doing and wherever you are. Byng Boys, I wish you luck." In the evening, festivities were held at the Grandstand for the veterans, including a massed band concert, dancing, gun displays and boxing. The participants included the Royal Canadian Mounted Police, Forces nurses, veterans of 1866, past wars and World War I.

In 1927, the Warriors' Day Parade coincided with the dedication of the Princes' Gates, attended by HRH Edward, Prince of Wales and his brother Prince George. The archway was built to commemorate 50 years of Canadian Confederation. The parade followed the Royal party along Lake Shore Boulevard through the new arch. The parade was then reviewed by the Princes.

In 1938, the parade attracted 20,000–30,000 Forces personnel and veterans from units in Ontario, Australia and Newfoundland. The eldest present were veterans from the Fenian Raids of 1866 and Australian veterans from the Boer Wars. The Grandstand was used as the reviewing stand for the large contingent.

From 1942 to 1946, the Exhibition Grounds were used as a military camp. The CNE was cancelled, as well as the Warriors' Day Parade. The fair resumed in 1947 along with the Warriors' Day Parade. The 1947 parade was attended by a record 272,000 persons. Its route was altered along Lake Shore Boulevard to avoid the Grandstand construction site.

The 1959 parade saluted the opening of the St. Lawrence Seaway with NATO warships attending, and the ships' companies marching. Lord Mountbatten, Admiral of the Fleet, took the salute from the veteran marchers.

In 1966, a South African War veteran passed away on parade. An order was issued to prohibit those veterans from marching in the parade, however twelve veterans over the age of 85 defied the order and joined the marchers in the 1967 parade. Cars to carry those veterans were not approved.

The 1989 parade had 9,000 marchers and saluted the 75th anniversary of Royal 22nd Regiment of Valcartier, Quebec.

In 1999, the Grandstand was demolished and the saluting stage moved to the Band Shell. In 2003, the parade was cancelled due to the electrical blackout. It resumed in 2004.

In 2007, the parade honoured the 90th anniversary of Vimy Ridge. For the first time wounded veterans from the Afghanistan campaign participated. The Language School of CFB Borden contributed 110 officers to march in the parade.

The 2011 parade was its 90th anniversary. A gala celebration for the veterans and volunteers was held at Hart House hall.

In 2015, the parade commemorated veterans of World War II on the 70th anniversary of the end of the war. In 2017, the parade commemorated the 100th anniversary of the Battle of Vimy Ridge and the 75th anniversary of the Dieppe Raid.

The 2020 and 2021 editions of the parade were cancelled due to COVID-19. This postponed the 100th anniversary parade to 2022. About 1,500 veterans, current Forces members, Royal Canadian Legion members and US military personnel marched in the parade. The parade had 25 marching bands.

The 2024 edition commemorated the 100th anniversary of the Royal Canadian Air Force and the 80th anniversary of D-Day.

The 2025 edition commemorated the 80th anniversary of the end of World War II and the Liberation of the Netherlands.
