= Jaylene Tyme =

Canadian drag performer

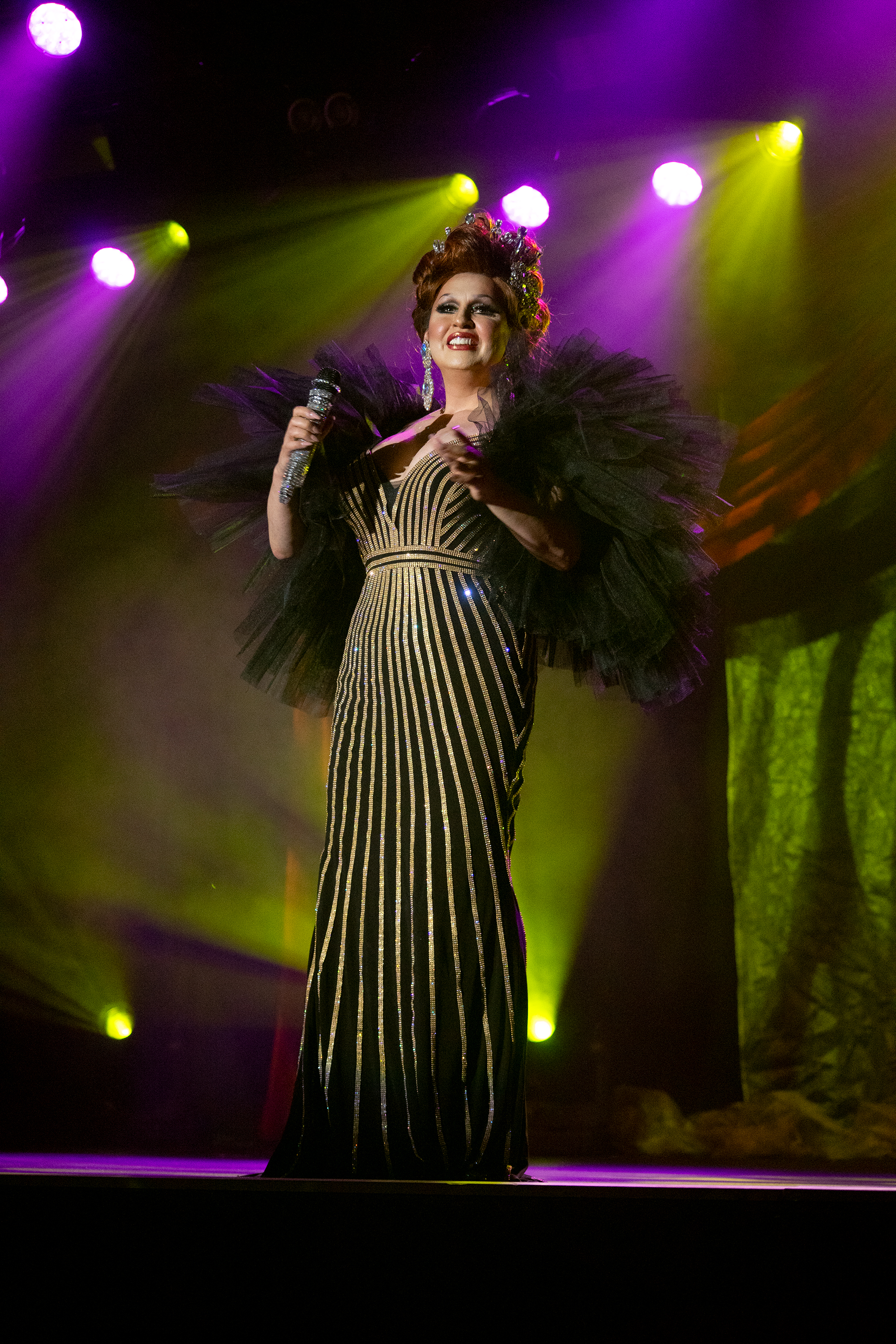
- Jaylene Tyme in 2023
- Other name: Jaylene McRae
- Occupation: Drag performer
- Television: Canada's a Drag; Canada's Drag Race (season 5)

Jaylene Tyme is the stage name of Jaylene McRae, a Canadian drag queen who was profiled on the fourth season of Canada's a Drag. She then competed on the fifth season of Canada's Drag Race, where she was awarded Miss Congeniality.

== Career ==
Jaylene Tyme first discovered drag in Calgary, Alberta before moving to Vancouver. In 2006 she was crowned the 35th Elected Empress of Vancouver by the Dogwood Monarchist Society - The Mother Court of Canada.

In June 2024 she was featured in the final episode of season four of Canada's a Drag, a CBC Gem docu-series which profiles various drag performers across Canada. By the time of her episode she had been doing drag in Vancouver for over 30 years.

In October 2024 she was announced to be one of the eleven queens competing on season five of Canada's Drag Race. She received a rose in the first episode for having the best Entrance look of the season, which paid tribute to Missing and Murdered Indigenous Women, Girls, and Two-Spirit People. However she was not chosen to lipsync for the win as one of the top two contestants in the episode.

During her run on Canada's Drag Race, she also received praise for bringing a kind, compassionate and motherly energy to the often drama-filled Werk Room, particularly when she responded to fellow competitor Xana's emotional breakdown over her disconnection from her own Métis heritage by giving Xana a traditional Métis ceinture fléchée.

Jaylene was ultimately eliminated in the fifth episode of the season after underperforming in the girl groups challenge and losing a lip-sync to Love Inc.'s "Here Comes the Sunshine" against Xana. She had previously been saved from lip-syncing for her life in the third episode by The Virgo Queen. She placed eighth overall. On social media she expressed regret that she was unable to reach the Snatch Game challenge, which took place in the episode immediately following her elimination, and revealed four planned celebrity impersonations: Cher, Dolly Parton, Mae West and Buffy Sainte-Marie.

In the final episode she wore a dress dedicated to the Every Child Matters movement, which she received blessing from the designer Andy Everson to wear. She was then awarded the title of Miss Congeniality by the season 4 winner Kitten Kaboodle.

== Personal life ==
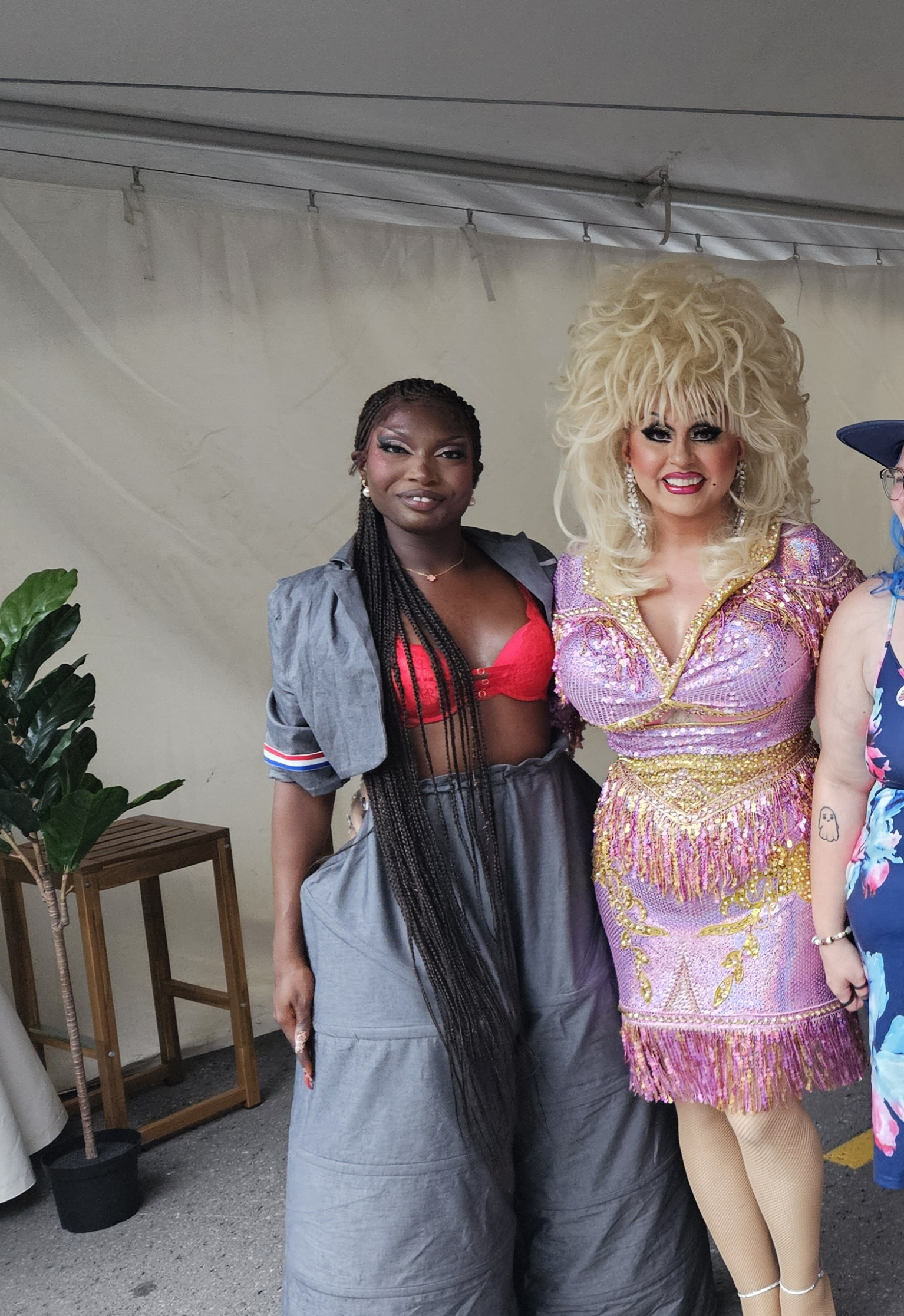
Jaylene Tyme (right) at Capital Pride 2025 in Ottawa with Makayla Couture.

Jaylene Tyme is a Two-Spirit First Nations and Métis Indigenous trans woman. She is a survivor of the Sixties Scoop, where she was removed from her Indigenous home and placed into a settler family. She was separated from her brother at age three and lived in five different homes before age four. She discussed her story of being a Sixties Scoop adoptee in the second episode of Canada's Drag Race, where she connected with fellow contestant Xana whose grandfather was also a Sixties Scoop survivor.

Jaylene Tyme is sober, having been in recovery from drug and alcohol addiction since the late 1990s. She is based in Vancouver as of 2024. Members of her drag family include Kendall Gender, Chelazon Leroux, and Canada's Drag Race season 4 winner Venus.

In a post-Drag Race interview on CBC Radio One's talk series Q, she spoke of the importance of using her platform as a performer to educate and raise awareness of both LGBTQ and indigenous issues.

== Filmography ==
Year	Title	Role	Notes
2024	Canada's a Drag	Herself	1 episode; docu-series
2024-2025	Canada's Drag Race	Herself	Contestant; season 5
2026	Canada's Drag Race	Herself	Guest; season 6, episode 9

== See also ==
- Indigenous drag performers
- List of people from Vancouver
