= Francheska: Prairie Queen =

2022 Canadian film directed by Laura O'Grady

- Directed by: Laura O'Grady
- Written by: Laura O'Grady; Jordan Bosch
- Produced by: Jenny Steele; Rosman Vallencia; Michelle Wong
- Starring: Francis Yutrago
- Cinematography: Michael Sorel
- Edited by: Jordan Bosch
- Music by: Andrea Wettstein; Alec Harrison
- Release date: September 23, 2022 (CIFF)
- Running time: 64 minutes
- Country: Canada
- Languages: English; Tagalog

Francheska: Prairie Queen is a Canadian documentary film, directed by Laura O'Grady and released in 2022. The film is a portrait of Francis Yutrago, a gay immigrant to Canada from the Philippines who performs as a drag queen under the name Francheska Dynamites in Lethbridge, Alberta.

Francheska was previously profiled in an episode of the CBC Gem web series Canada's a Drag in 2020.

The film premiered at the Calgary International Film Festival.

The film was longlisted for the Directors Guild of Canada's 2022 Jean-Marc Vallée DGC Discovery Award.
