= Fay Slift and Fluffy Soufflé =

Canadian drag duo

- Occupations: Drag Queens, Storytellers, Children's Television Hosts
- Years active: 2016–present (as a duo)
- Television: The Fabulous Show with Fay and Fluffy (2022–present)
- Awards: Youth Media Alliance Award (2023)

Fay Slift and Fluffy Soufflé are a Canadian drag queen duo based in Toronto who are most well known for their drag queen story times which were adapted into the Family Jr. children's television show The Fabulous Show with Fay and Fluffy in 2022. They were also profiled in the third season of Canada's a Drag in 2020.

== Members ==
Fay Slift is the drag persona of Jean Paul "JP" Kane, who also works as a kindergarten teacher with the Toronto District School Board.

Fluffy Soufflé is the drag persona of Kaleb Robertson, who also works as an independent cultural producer and child care provider, including as a nanny and formerly running a home daycare.

== History ==
In 2015 Fay Slift was inspired by Michelle Tea, a San Francisco based author and activist, and the launch of Drag Queen Story Time in the city. The duo began working together on drag queen story times in Toronto in June 2016 as part of Toronto Pride, later expanding to other parts on Ontario and Quebec. In 2016 two show creators from Lopii Productions, a children's media boutique based in Toronto, met with Fay and Fluffy at one of their story times where they were inspired to create their TV series. The show, titled The Fabulous Show with Fay and Fluffy premiered in 2022 on Family Jr. in Canada. The variety cabaret preschool show features their stories, puppets, animated segments, and songs. It was well received critically and was nominated for four Canadian Screen Awards in 2023 and won a Youth Media Alliance Award.

In 2023 the series published in first book in a planned series, The Fabulous Show with Fay and Fluffy Presents: The Fabulous Book About Families. The book is published by Mango Publishing Group. A second season of the series was ordered in 2023 and is set to premiere in fall 2024.

In 2018 they appeared on the morning television series Breakfast Television.

In 2019 they ended the relationship "Fay and Fluffy's Storytime" had with the Toronto Public Library over the library hosting a talk by Meghan Murphy. Fluffy stated that he could not "continue a relationship with a space that will host someone who is actively fighting to take away my legal rights as a human."

In 2020 the duo were profiled in the third season of the CBC Gem docu-series Canada's a Drag.

In 2022 and 2024 they appeared at the Toronto International Festival of Authors.

In 2023 they were featured in a Kids Help Phone advertisement. They also faced protest at a Mississauga storytime event with similar cases happening at other drag story times across Canada. They also served as the hosts of the 2023 Kidscreen Awards at the Kidscreen Summit in Miami.

== Filmography ==
Year	Title	Role	Notes
2018	Breakfast Television	Themselves	1 episode segment
2020	Canada's a Drag	Themselves	1 episode
2022-present	The Fabulous Show with Fay and Fluffy	Hosts	

== Awards and nominations ==
Award	Date of ceremony	Category	Nominees	Result	Ref.
Ontario Library Association	2020	President's Award for Exceptional Achievement	Themselves	Won	
Rose d'Or Awards	November 2022	Children and Youth	The Fabulous Show with Fay and Fluffy	Nominated	
Canadian Screen Awards	April 2023	Best Pre-School Program or Series	The Fabulous Show with Fay and Fluffy	Nominated	
Canadian Screen Awards	April 2023	Shaw Rocket Fund Kids' Choice Award	The Fabulous Show with Fay and Fluffy	Won	
Canadian Screen Awards	April 2023	Best Photography in a Lifestyle or Reality Program or Series	"I Love Where I Come From" - The Fabulous Show with Fay and Fluffy (for Alysha Galbreath)	Nominated	
Canadian Screen Awards	April 2023	Best Writing in a Pre-School Series	"I Love Being Different" - The Fabulous Show with Fay and Fluffy (for Victoria Gallant)	Nominated	
Canadian Screen Awards	April 2023	Best Writing in a Pre-School Series	"I Love My Family" - The Fabulous Show with Fay and Fluffy (for Tyra Sweet)	Nominated	
Youth Media Alliance Awards	June 2023	Excellence in Preschool Live Action	The Fabulous Show with Fay and Fluffy	Won	
Japan Prize	November 2023	Audiovisual Works - Pre-school Division	"I Love My Family" - The Fabulous Show with Fay and Fluffy	Nominated	
