= Tynomi Banks =

Canadian drag queen

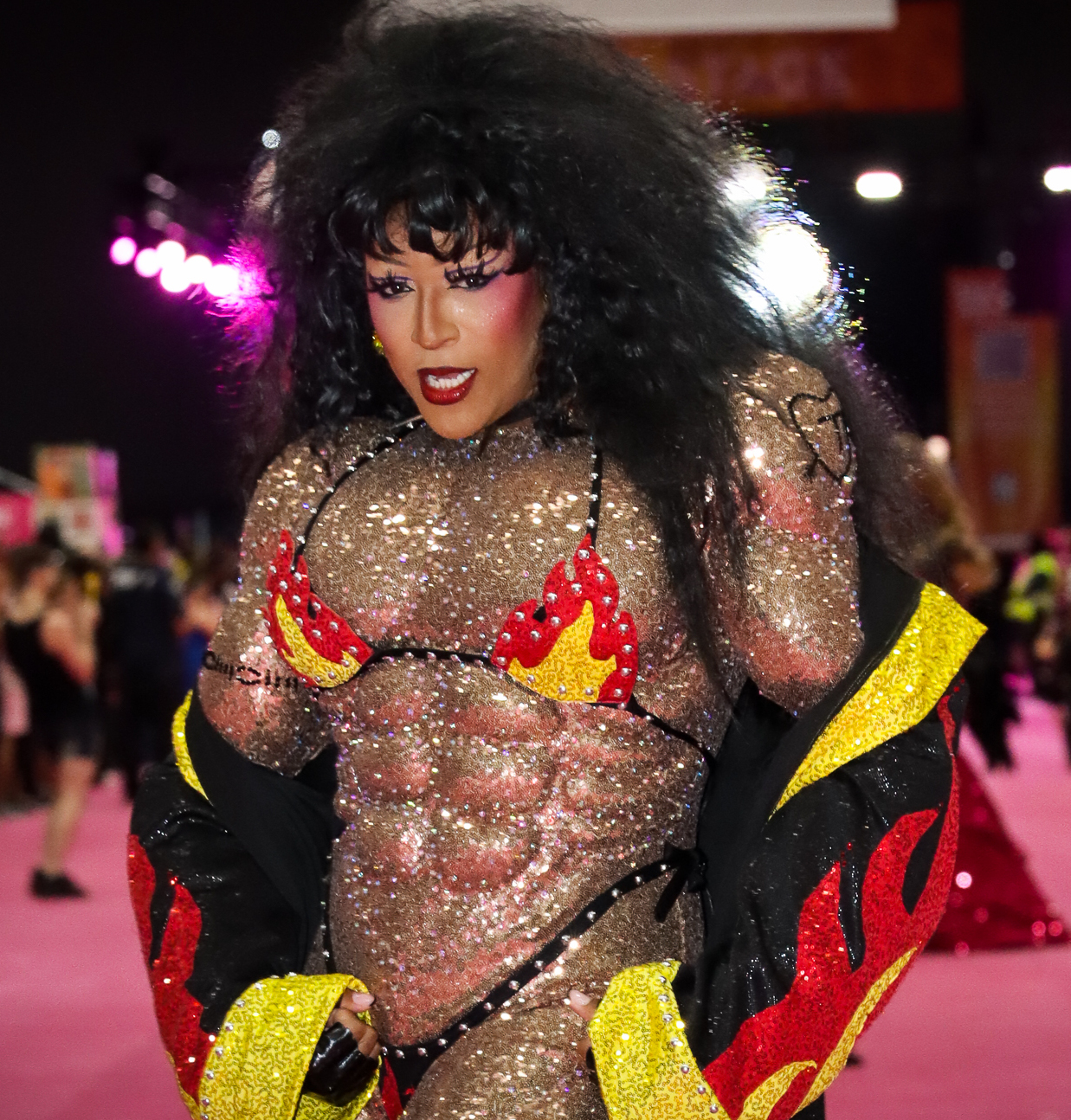
- Tynomi Banks at RuPaul's DragCon LA, 2024
- Born: Sheldon Orlando McIntosh; Canada
- Education: Durham College (BA)
- Occupation: Drag queen
- Television: Canada's a Drag (season 2); Canada's Drag Race (season 1); Canada's Drag Race: Canada vs. the World (season 2)
- Website: tynomibanks.com

Sheldon Orlando McIntosh, known professionally as Tynomi Banks, is a Canadian drag queen. A staple of Toronto's queer nightlife scene since the 2010s, Tynomi Banks performed in drag for over a decade before competing on the first season of the reality competition television series Canada's Drag Race (2020) and later the second season of Canada's Drag Race: Canada vs. the World (2024).

== Early life ==
Born in Canada and raised in Pickering, Ontario, McIntosh later attended Durham College, studying public relations.

== Career ==
A staple of Toronto's queer nightlife scene, Tynomi Banks has performed in the entertainment industry as a drag queen at bars, festivals, and events for over a decade. In 2018, during Pride Toronto, she was selected to participate in a marketing campaign for Crest and curated Spotify's playlist for the gay pride event. Tynomi Banks was a trophy bearer during the 7th Canadian Screen Awards in 2019. She appeared in Joseph Amenta's short film Flood, which premiered at the 2019 Toronto International Film Festival. Tynomi Banks was a spokesperson for the Spanish jewelry company Carrera y Carrera, as of 2020. In February 2021, Tynomi Banks released a Black Lives Matter-themed clothing line. In June 2021, she performed as a part of the Drive ’N Queens Summer Series.

=== Television and music ===
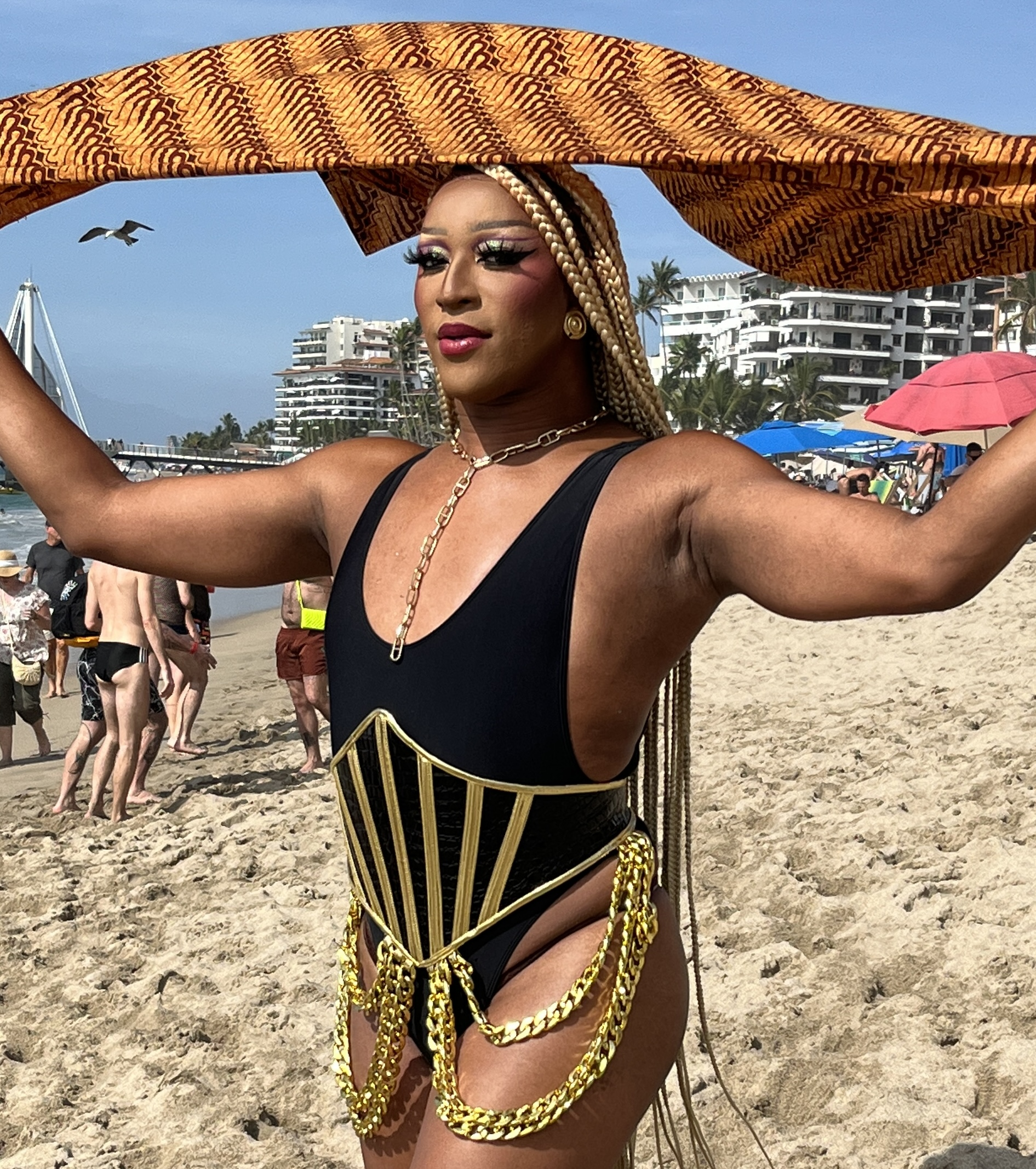
Tynomi Banks in Puerto Vallarta in 2023

In 2019, Tynomi Banks appeared in the second season of the documentary series Canada's a Drag. The following year, she competed on the first season of the reality competition television series Canada's Drag Race, based on the American series RuPaul's Drag Race. One of the more popular contestants entering the competition, Tynomi Banks was eliminated during the fourth episode after placing in the bottom and lip syncing for her life three weeks in a row. Although no official Miss Congeniality was named in-show for the season, she won an informal poll of the queens in post-elimination interviews with the entertainment website PopBuzz. In 2021, Tynomi Banks appeared in an advertisement for the online financial management platform Wealthsimple, which premiered during the Canadian broadcast of Super Bowl LV. She competed on the second season of Canada's Drag Race: Canada vs. the World, which aired in 2024.

Banks signed to Wax Records, and released her debut single "Die for Love" in 2024. In the same year she appeared as a guest vocalist on "Save Your Breath", a song from Nelly Furtado's new album 7.

== Personal life ==
McIntosh is Black Canadian and queer, and is based in Toronto. His drag artistry is inspired by Tyra Banks, Naomi Campbell, and Grace Jones, and he is known for impersonating Beyoncé and Whitney Houston. He has spoken to the media about his Jamaican heritage and how it influences his drag and performance style.

== Filmography ==
=== Film ===
Year	Title	Role
2015	You Are Free	Lolita
2017	Cherry Cola	Dancing Queen
2019	Flood	Tynomi
2020	Jump, Darling	Jacqueline O'Nasty

=== Television ===
Year	Title	Role	Notes
2012	Degrassi: The Next Generation	Drag Queen	Episode "Viva Las Vegas, Pt. 2"
2019	Canada's a Drag (season 2)	Herself	
2020	Canada's Drag Race (season 1)	Contestant (9th place)	
2024	Canada's Drag Race: Canada vs. the World (season 2)	Contestant (7th place)	

=== Web series ===
Year	Title	Role	Notes	Ref
2018	Queens of Netflix	Herself	Episode: "Chewing Gum"	
2022	Bring Back My Girls	Herself		

=== Music videos ===
Year	Title	Artist	Ref
2013	"Lost Kitten"	METRIC	

== Discography ==
Title	Year	Album	Ref
"Not Sorry Aboot It" (with the cast of Canada's Drag Race, season 1)	2020	Non-album single	
"Iconic (Drag Reveal Session)" (Leah Allyce Canali feat. Tynomi Banks)	2020	Non-album single	
"Save Your Breath" (Nelly Furtado feat. Williane 108, Charmie, Taborah Johnson and Tynomi Banks)	2024	7 (Nelly Furtado)	
"Die for Love"	2024	Non-album single	
