= The Fabulous Show with Fay and Fluffy =

Canadian children's television series

The Fabulous Show with Fay and Fluffy is a Canadian children's television show which premiered in 2022 on Family Jr.

Hosted by drag entertainers Fay Slift and Fluffy Soufflé (portrayed respectively by Jean Paul "JP" Kane and Kaleb Robertson), the variety preschool series features stories, puppets, animated segments, and songs.

== Development ==
The series was created and produced by Lopii Productions, a children's media boutique based in Toronto. The show was inspired by a meeting where creators Rennata and Georgina met JP and Kaleb at the event "Fay & Fluffy's Storytime: Drag Queen Storytime in Toronto" in 2016. Sponsors who hosted the storytimes included The 519 Church, Buddies in Bad Times theatre, Glad Day Bookshop, Queen Books, and Never Apart.

== Awards ==
Fay and Fluffy received the President's Award for Exceptional Achievement from the Ontario Library Association in 2020.

The series received four Canadian Screen Award nominations at the 11th Canadian Screen Awards in 2023, including Best Pre-School Program or Series.

It also received the Youth Media Alliance Award of Excellence for Preschool Live Action in 2023.

It was selected as a finalist for the 2023 Japan Prize.

== Broadcast ==
The program airs in Canada on Family Jr. and is distributed by Sinking Ship Entertainment.

Season 2 aired in 2024, and both seasons were made available on Prime Video.

== Episodes ==
Season 1 has 27 episodes, and Season 2 has 26, for a total of 53.
