= Premiere Ball =

- Canada's Drag Race episode
- Episode no.: Season 4 Episode 1
- Original air date: November 16, 2023

Guest appearances
- Tegan Quin and Sara Quin of Tegan and Sara

Episode chronology
← Previous "True North Strong (and Fierce)"	Next → "QV-She"
- Canada's Drag Race season 4

"Premiere Ball" is the premiere episode of the fourth season of the Canadian reality competition television series Canada's Drag Race, which aired on November 16, 2023 on the television network Crave. In this episode the queens compete in the Premiere Ball in three separate categories to make the best first impression. Canadian musical duo Tegan and Sara are the guest judges who are joined by regular panelists Brooke Lynn Hytes, Brad Goreski and Traci Melchor.

The episode was nominated for three Canadian Screen Awards at the 13th Canadian Screen Awards, winning two.

== Episode ==
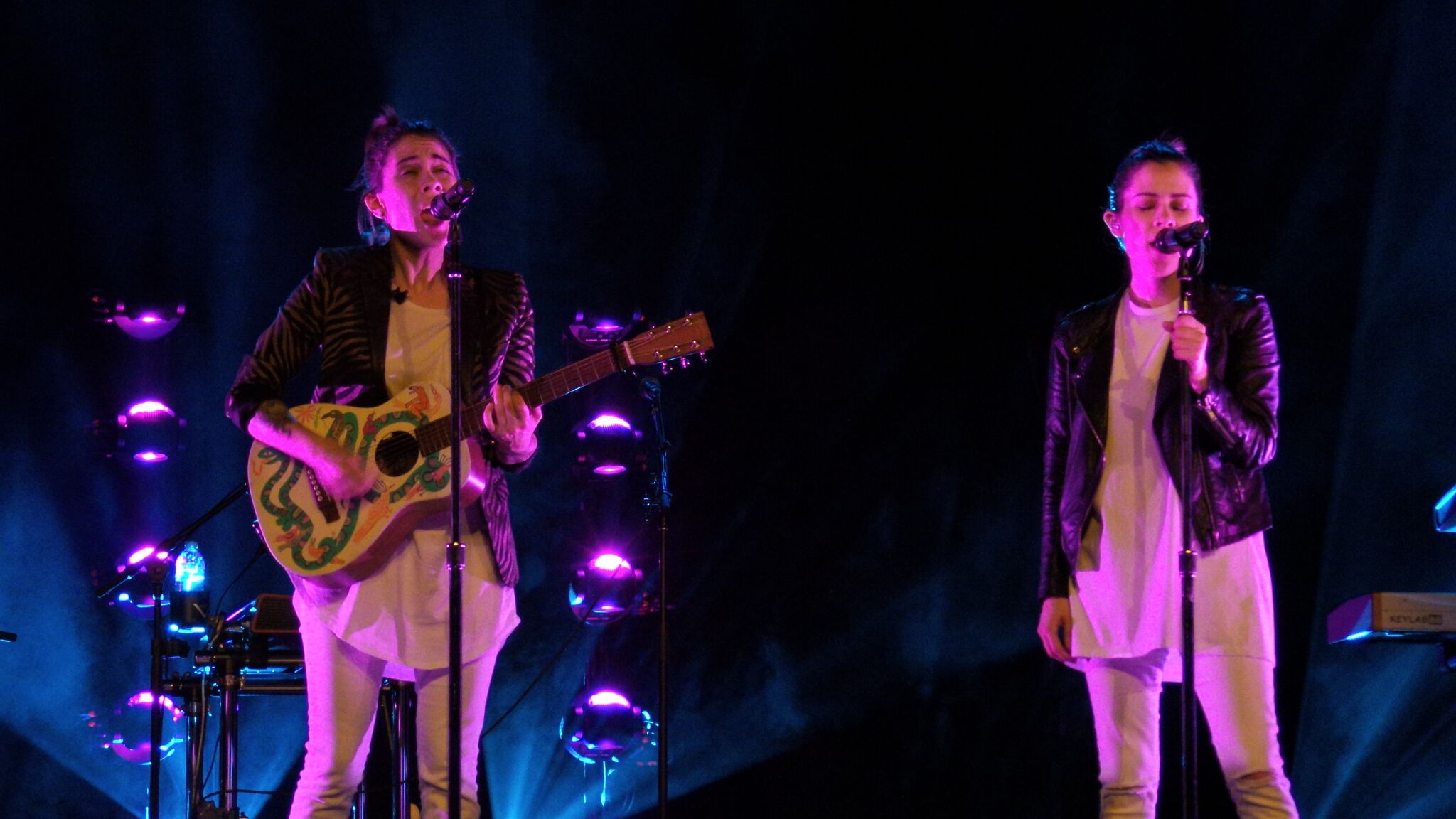
Tegan and Sara (pictured in 2017) are the guest judges for the episode.

The episode begins with eleven new queens entering the workroom for the first time. They are Venus from Vancouver; Denim from Montreal, who is the first trans man to compete on Canada's Drag Race; Kiki Coe from Ottawa; Luna Dubois from Toronto; Sisi Superstar from Montreal; Melinda Verga from Edmonton; Kitten Kaboodle from Toronto, who is the oldest queen to compete on any season of Drag Race at 57; Nearah Nuff from Calgary; Aurora Matrix from Toronto; The Girlfriend Experience from Vancouver; and Aimee Yonce Shennel from Ottawa.

Following the queens entrances Brooke Lynn Hytes, Brad Goreski, and Traci Melchor enter the workroom and reveal that the maxi challenge, the Premiere Ball, is already well underway, and that each judge has a 'rosebud' to give to the queen with their favourite entrance look. Brooke Lynn chooses Denim, Brad chooses Aimee Yonce Shennel, and Traci chooses Venus.

For the second category, "Shimmering Showgirls", each queen will present a showgirl look while they perform in a 360 set to showcase their look. On the runway regular panelists Brooke Lynn Hytes, Brad Goreski and Traci Melchor are joined by guest judges Sara Quin and Tegan Quin of Canadian indie duo Tegan and Sara. The queens then present their third looks for the category "Me, Myself, and I: Your Very Best Drag" on the mainstage.

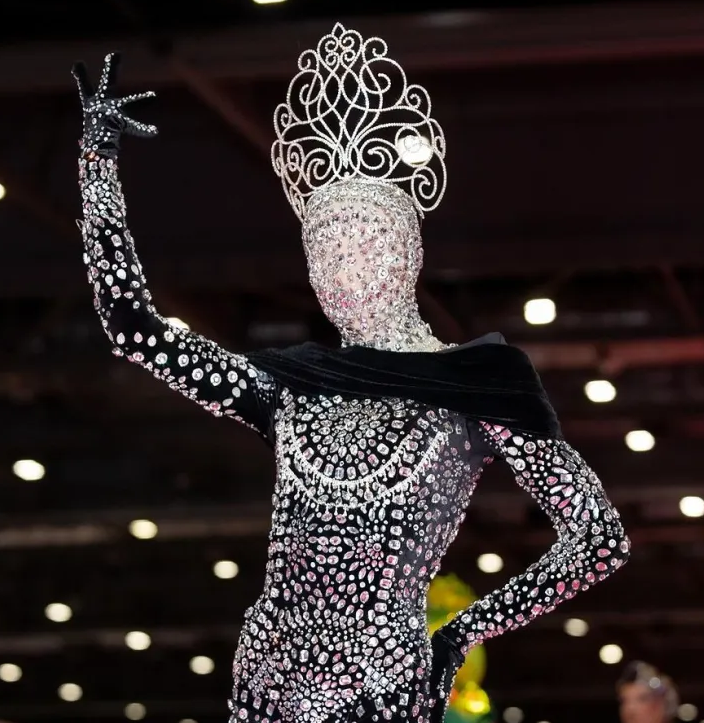
Venus (pictured in 2024) wins the maxi challenge.

Denim, Kiki Coe, and Venus receive positive critiques for their three looks, while Melinda Verga, Nearah Nuff, and Sisi Superstar receive negative ones. Kiki Coe and Nearah Nuff are declared safe by Brooke Lynn Hytes before she reveals that no one will be eliminated this episode. Denim and Venus are declared as the top two queens of the week and must lip sync for the win. They lip sync to "Feel It in My Bones" by Tiësto featuring Tegan and Sara. Following the lip sync Venus wins the maxi challenge, winning a $5,000 cash tip courtesy of Fabricland.

== Reception ==
The episode was nominated for three Canadian Screen Awards at the 13th Canadian Screen Awards. Shelagh O’Brien won for Best Direction, Reality/Competition and Andrew Kinsella and Tara Smith won for Best Production Design or Art Direction, Non-fiction. The third nomination was for John Diemer, Scott Brachmayer, Rosie Eberhard, Levi Linton, Rob Taylor, Eric Leigh, and Alastair Sims for Best Sound, Lifestyle, Reality, or Entertainment, which lost to the Canada's Drag Race: Canada vs. the World episode "Snatch Game: The Rusical".
