= Snatch Game (Canada's Drag Race season 4) =

- Canada's Drag Race episode
- Episode no.: Season 4 Episode 5
- Original air date: December 14, 2023

Guest appearance
- Jaida Essence Hall

Episode chronology
← Previous "Out of the Closet"	Next → "Lip Sync Slay Offs"
- Canada's Drag Race season 4

"Snatch Game" is the fifth episode of the fourth season of the Canadian reality competition television series Canada's Drag Race, which aired on December 14, 2023, on the television network Crave. The episode sees contestants improvising celebrity impersonations while playing the Snatch Game. RuPaul's Drag Race season 12 winner Jaida Essence Hall is the guest judge, who is joined by regular panelists Brooke Lynn Hytes, Brad Goreski, and Traci Melchor.

The episode was nominated for a Canadian Cinema Editors Award at the 14th annual awards for Best Editing in Lifestyle/Competition/Reality.

== Episode ==
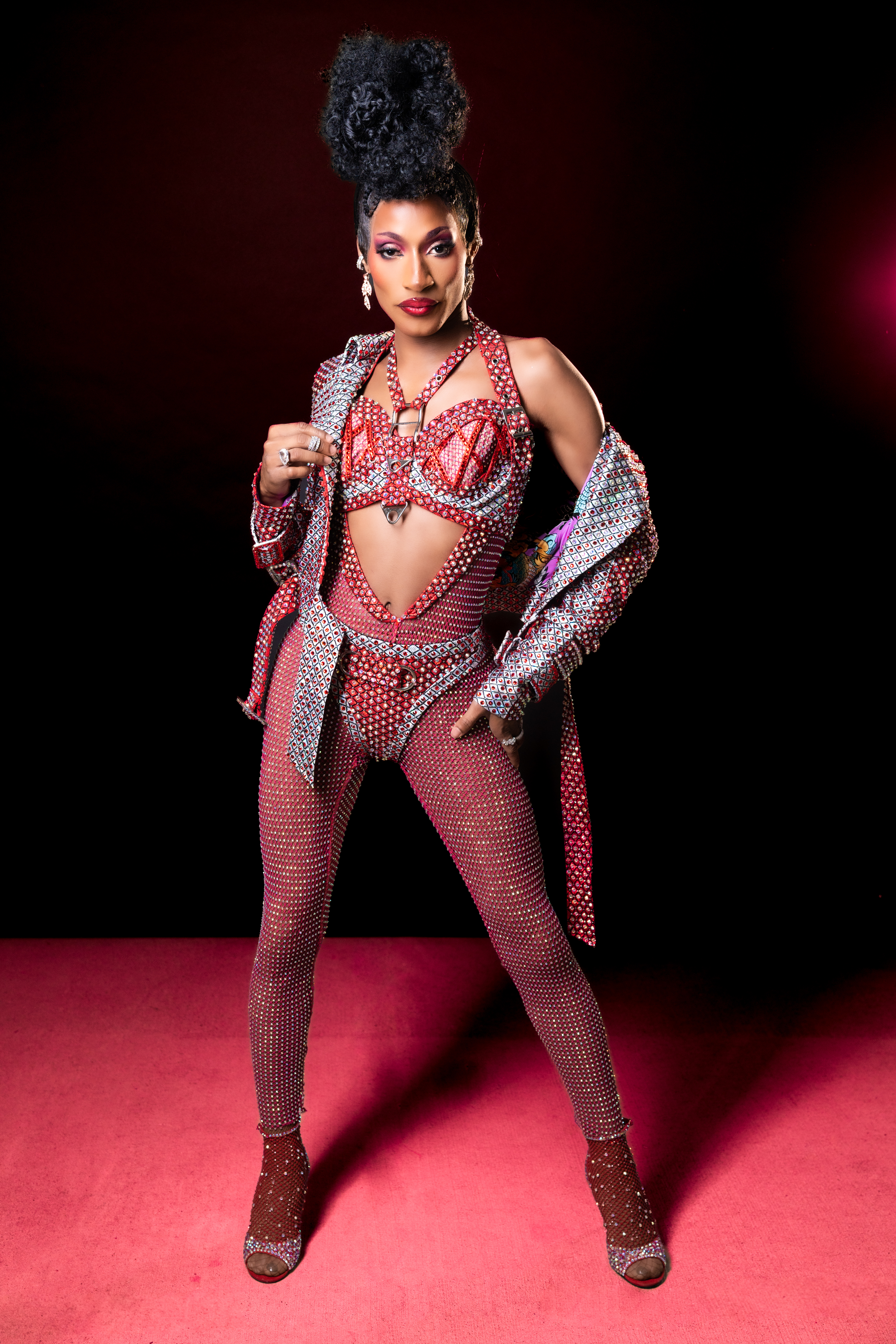
Jaida Essence Hall (pictured in 2022) is the episode's guest judge.

For the mini-challenge the queens read each other, inspired by the documentary Paris is Burning. Denim wins the challenge, winning $2,500 courtesy of the Men's Room.

For the maxi challenge the queens will compete in the annual Snatch Game, where they must improvise as celebrity characters on a panel, a parody of Match Game. The celebrities impersonated are:

- Aimee Yonce Shennel as Jesus Christ
- Aurora Matrix as Zhao Bing
- Denim as Julia Fox
- Kiki Coe as Elizabeth Taylor
- Kitten Kaboodle as Jennifer Coolidge
- Luna DuBois as Mary Cosby
- Melinda Verga as Manny Pacquiao
- Nearah Nuff as Jennifer Coolidge
- Venus as Joe Exotic

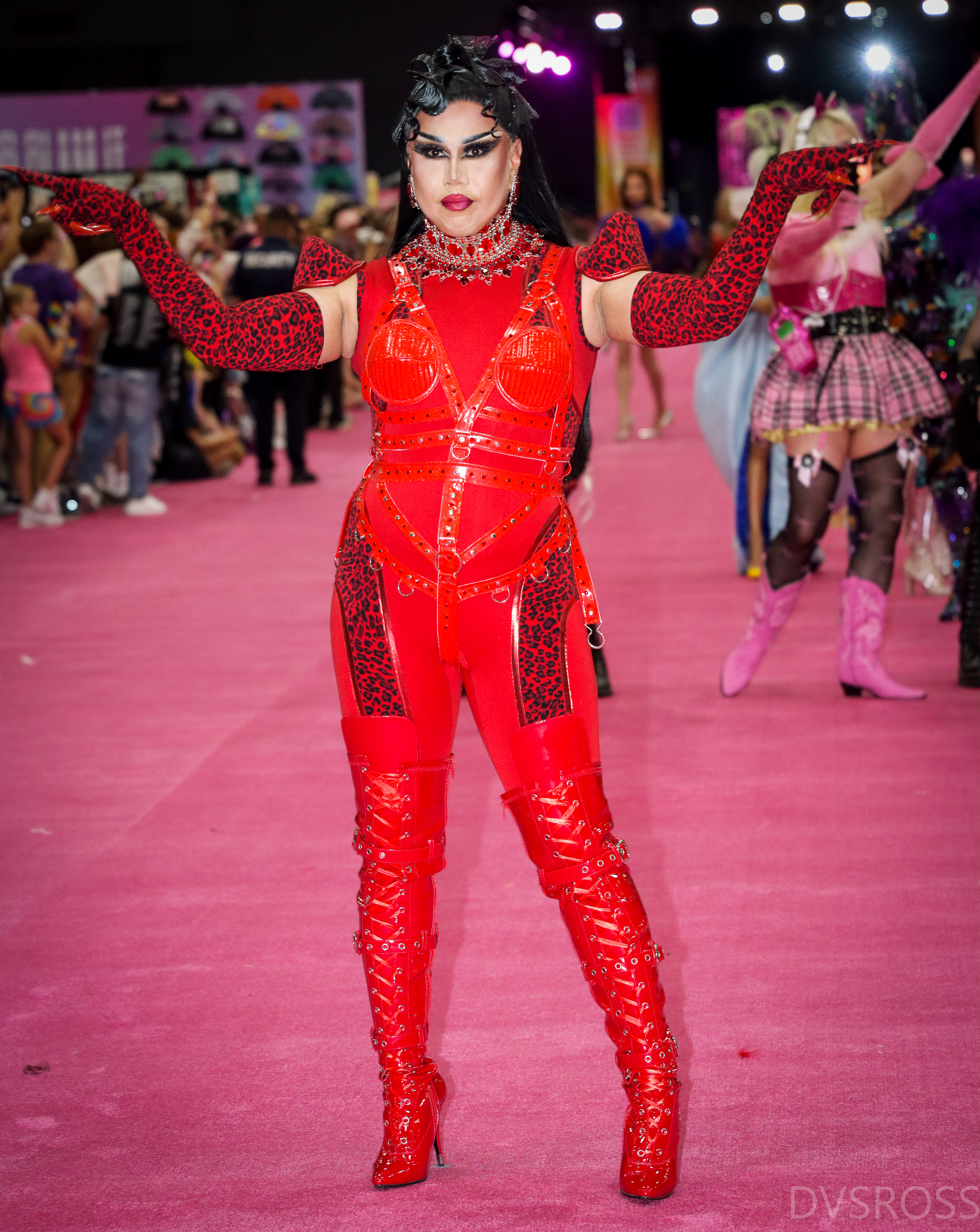
Melinda Verga (pictured in 2024) wins the Snatch Game for her performance as Filipino boxer Manny Pacquiao.

On the runway regular panellists Brooke Lynn Hytes, Brad Goreski, and Traci Melchor are joined by guest judge Jaida Essence Hall. The runway theme is Steampunk. Kitten Kaboodle, Melinda Verga, and Venus are the best of the week, while Aurora Matrix, Kiki Coe, and Luna DuBois are the worst. Melinda Verga wins the challenge, winning a $5,000 shopping spree at Shoefreaks and the Golden Beaver, giving her the power to save a queen from the bottom. Kitten Kaboodle and Venus are safe, leaving Aurora Matrix, Kiki Coe, and Luna DuBois and the bottom three of the week.

Following deliberation in Untucked! Melinda Verga decides to use the Golden Beaver to save Kiki Coe, leaving Aurora Matrix and Luna Dubois up for elimination. They lip sync to "She's All I Wanna Be" by Tate McRae. Aurora Matrix wins the lip sync and Luna DuBois is eliminated.

== Reception ==
At the 14th annual Canadian Cinema Editors Awards in June 2024 Jonathan Dowler was nominated for his editing work on the episode in the category Best Editing in Lifestyle/Competition/Reality.
