= A Star Is Born (Canada's Drag Race) =

- Canada's Drag Race episode
- Episode no.: Season 4 Episode 8
- Original air date: January 4, 2024

Guest appearance
- Sarain Fox (guest judge)

Episode chronology
← Previous "From Drags to Riches: The Rusical"	Next → "Grand Finale"
- Canada's Drag Race season 4

"A Star Is Born" is the eighth episode of the fourth season of the Canadian reality competition television series Canada's Drag Race, which aired on January 4, 2024 on the television network Crave. In this episode the queens must give a drag makeover to a loved one. Sarain Fox is the guest judge who is joined by regular panelists Brooke Lynn Hytes, Brad Goreski and Traci Melchor.

At the 13th Canadian Screen Awards the episode won the Canadian Screen Award for Best Achievement in Hair.

== Episode ==
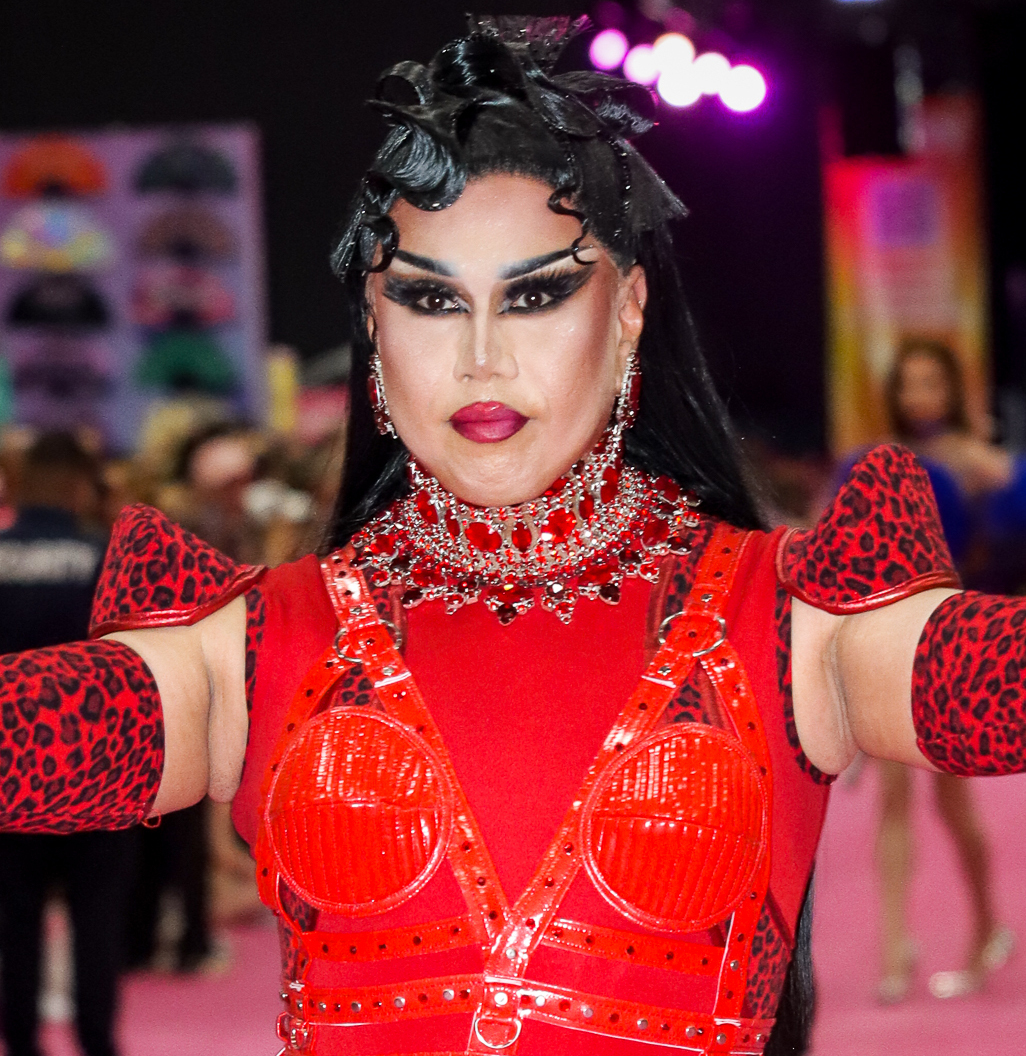
Melinda Verga (pictured in 2024) wins the mini challenge.

The episode begins with loved ones of the queens entering the workroom. Aurora Matrix is joined by her best friend Trinity, Denim is joined by her mother Cheryl, Melinda Verga is joined by her partner Scott, Nearah Nuff is joined by her fiancé Jakob, and Venus is joined by her mother Joanne. For the mini challenge the loved ones must do their queen's makeup for a quick-drag photoshoot for new headshots. Melinda Verga and her partner Scott win the challenge, winning a $2,500 cash tip courtesy of O'Grady's pub.

For the maxi challenge the queens must makeover their loved ones into members of their drag families and give a duo performance on the main stage. The drag family members are:

- Aurora Matrix and Supernova Matrix
- Denim and Velvet
- Melinda Verga and Conchita Verga
- Nearah Nuff and Buffy Nuff
- Venus and Uranus

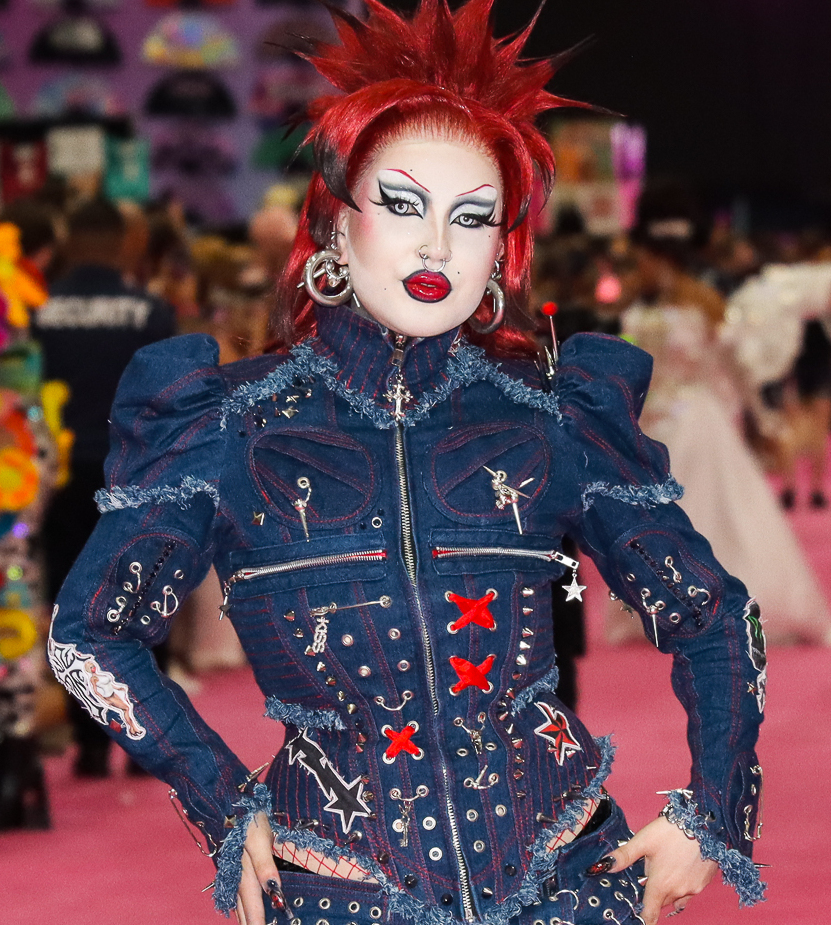
Denim (pictured in 2024) wins the maxi challenge.

On the runway regular panelists Brooke Lynn Hytes, Brad Goreski and Traci Melchor are joined by guest judge Sarain Fox. Denim and Venus receive positive critiques, while Aurora Matrix, Nearah Nuff, and Melinda Verga receive negative ones. Denim wins the challenge, winning a $5,000 cash tip and a $5,000 donation to PFLAG Canada courtesy of Neutrogena. Aurora Matrix and Venus are safe, leaving Melinda Verga and Nearah Nuff up for elimination. They lip sync to "I Didn't Just Come Here to Dance" by Carly Rae Jepsen. Nearah Nuff wins the lipsync and Melinda Verga is eliminated.

== Reception ==
At the 13th Canadian Screen Awards Kirsten Klontz won the Canadian Screen Award for Best Achievement in Hair for her work on the episode.
