= The Girlfriend Experience (drag queen) =

Canadian drag performer

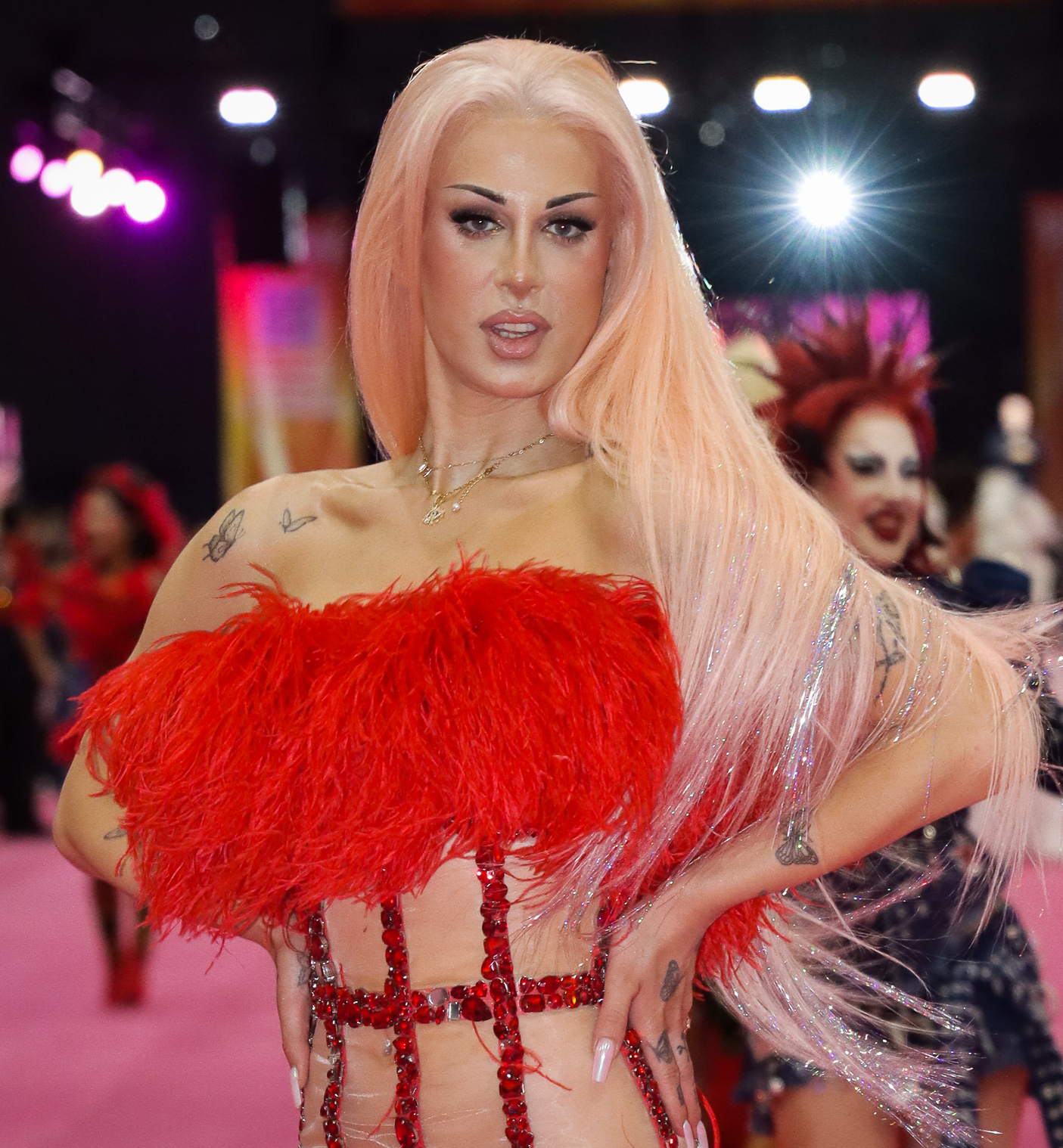
- The Girlfriend Experience at RuPaul's DragCon LA, 2024
- Born: June 25, 1991 (age 35); Germany
- Other names: Daniela Michèle Le Bon; Berlin Stiller
- Occupation: Drag queen
- Television: Canada's Drag Race (season 4)
- Website: girlfriendexperience.ca

Daniela Michèle Le Bon (born June 25, 1991), known by the stage name The Girlfriend Experience, is a German-born Canada-based drag performer who appeared on the first season of Canada's a Drag and competed on the fourth season of Canada's Drag Race.

== Early life ==
The Girlfriend Experience was born in Germany. She was raised in Vancouver, British Columbia, and Germany, by her mother and father, respectively.

As a teenager, she was kicked out of her home by her mother when it was discovered that she was attending gay bars. She then began performing in drag on Davie Street in Vancouver while working part-time at a local McDonald's. She reconnected with her family after 7 years of performing, which motivated her to become sober.

== Career ==
Under the drag name Berlin Stiller, she was featured in the CBC Gem docu-series Canada's a Drag in 2018.

The Girlfriend Experience competed on season 4 of Canada's Drag Race. She was the second contestant to be eliminated. On the show, she and fellow contestant Denim said using the terms "AFAB" and "AMAB" (assigned female at birth and assigned male at birth, respectively) can be transphobic when used to categorize drag entertainers.

== Personal life ==
The Girlfriend Experience is a trans woman. She lives in Vancouver.

== Filmography ==
- Canada's a Drag
- Canada's Drag Race (season 4)
- Bring Back My Girls (2024)
