= Denim (disambiguation) =

Denim is a kind of cloth. It may also refer to:

- Denim (band), Lawrence Hayward's musical group
- Denim Air, a Dutch charter airline
- Denim (drag queen), a Canadian drag entertainer
