= Pieronek =

Pieronek is a Polish surname.

== Notable people ==
- Mardi Pieronek (born 1962), Canadian TikToker
- Tadeusz Pieronek (1934–2018), Polish Catholic bishop
