= Canada's Drag Race All Stars =

Canadian reality competition television series (since 2026)

- Genre: Reality competition
- Presented by: Brooke Lynn Hytes
- Judges: Brooke Lynn Hytes; Jimbo; Priyanka
- Country of origin: Canada
- No. of seasons: 1
- No. of episodes: 6

Production
- Running time: 60 minutes
- Production company: Blue Ant Media

Original release
- Network: Crave
- Release: July 9, 2026 – present

Related
- Canada's Drag Race; RuPaul's Drag Race All Stars; Canada's Drag Race: Canada vs. the World

Canada's Drag Race All Stars is a Canadian reality competition television series, as a spin-off for the original Canada's Drag Race and based on the American television franchise RuPaul's Drag Race All Stars. It premiered on July 9, 2026 on Canadian television network and streaming service Crave.

The series is the third spin off from Canada's Drag Race following Canada's Drag Race: Canada vs. the World and Slaycation. Canada is also the third non-American Drag Race franchise to receive an "All Stars" spin off, following Drag Race España All Stars and Drag Race France All Stars.

== Background ==
The Canadian edition of the Drag Race franchise, Canada's Drag Race, first premiered in 2020. In 2022 the spinoff Canada's Drag Race: Canada vs. the World premiered. It featured contestants from the original Canadian series returning to compete against contestants from international editions of Drag Race. Contestants from the Canadian edition also appeared on other international "All Stars" and "vs. the World" series including RuPaul's Drag Race: UK vs. the World, RuPaul's Drag Race Global All Stars, and Drag Race Philippines: Slaysian Royale. Additionally, Jimbo from the first season of Canada's Drag Race won the eighth season of the American "All Stars" series, RuPaul's Drag Race All Stars.

== Production ==
The series was officially announced on February 19, 2026, by Bell Media and Crave. It was hosted by Canada's Drag Race host Brooke Lynn Hytes, who was joined on the judges panel by Canada's Drag Race season 1 winner Priyanka and Canada's Drag Race season 1 contestant and RuPaul's Drag Race All Stars season 8 winner Jimbo. This makes it the first all-drag performer judging panel in Drag Race.

The series is co-produced by Crave, Blue Ant Studios, and Drag Race production company World of Wonder, all of which have co-produced all seasons of Canada's Drag Race and its spinoffs. Executive producers for Blue Ant Studios are Matthew Hornburg, Mark Bishop, Donna Luke, and Laura Michalchyshyn. Trevor Boris is executive producer and showrunner, Shivani Srivastava is supervising producer. Executive producers for World of Wonder are Fenton Bailey, Randy Barbato, Tom Campbell, and RuPaul Charles.

The series consists of six 1-hour-long episodes. It will feature returning contestants competing to be crowned "Canada's Ultimate All-Star" and win a cash prize of $100,000. It is set to premiere on July 9, 2026.

Along with airing on Crave's television network and streaming service in Canada, it is also available internationally on WOW Presents Plus.

== Contestants ==
Ages, names, and cities stated are at time of filming.

Contestants of Canada's Drag Race All Stars season 1 and their backgrounds
Contestant	Age	Hometown	Original season(s)	Original placement(s)	Outcome
Aurora Matrix	26	Toronto, Ontario	Season 4	Runner-up	Winner
Nearah Nuff	25	Calgary, Alberta	Season 4	3rd place	Runner-up
Jada Shada Hudson	41	Toronto, Ontario	Season 3	Runner-up	3rd place
Sami Landri	27	Moncton, New Brunswick	Season 6	3rd place (Note: Sami Landri was voted Fan Favourite on her original season.)	3rd place
Tiffany Ann Co.	34	Vancouver, British Columbia	Season 5	10th place	5th place
Makayla Couture	23	Toronto, Ontario	Season 5	Runner-up	6th place
Juice Boxx	37	Port Hope, Ontario	Season 1	12th place	7th place (Note: Juice Boxx was voted Miss Congeniality by fellow contestants.)
Pythia	31	Montreal, Quebec	Season 2	Runner-up	8th place (Note: Pythia was voted Fan Favourite by the viewers after the show aired.)
Pythia	31	Montreal, Quebec	Global All Stars Season 1	7th place	8th place
Jackie Cox	40	New York City, United States	US Season 12	5th place	9th place

== Contestant progress ==
Legend:

Aurora Matrix won Canada's Drag Race All Stars season 1.
Nearah Nuff was the runner-up.
Juice Boxx was voted Miss Congeniality (Miss C) by fellow contestants.
WIN indicates that the contestant won the challenge.
WIN indicates that the contestant won one of the four rounds of the CUNTest and advanced to the finale.
Pythia was voted Fan Favourite (FF) by the viewers after the show aired.
SAFE indicates that the contestant was declared safe by the judges.
BVR (Beaver) indicates that the contestant received the Golden Beaver and was saved from the bottom three.
BTM (Bottom) indicates that the contestant was up for elimination.
ELIM (Eliminated) indicates that the contestant was eliminated.
Guest indicates that the contestant returned as a guest.

Contestants progress with placements in each episode
Contestant	Episode					
Contestant	1	2	3	4	5	6
Aurora Matrix	SAFE	WIN	WIN	BTM	WIN	Winner
Nearah Nuff	BTM	SAFE	BVR	WIN	WIN	Runner-up
Jada Shada Hudson	SAFE	SAFE	SAFE	SAFE	WIN	Eliminated
Sami Landri	SAFE	SAFE	SAFE	SAFE	WIN	Eliminated
Tiffany Ann Co.	SAFE	BVR	BTM	BVR	ELIM	Guest
Makayla Couture	SAFE	BTM	SAFE	ELIM		Guest
Juice Boxx	BVR	SAFE	ELIM			Miss C
Pythia	WIN	ELIM				FF
Jackie Cox	ELIM					Guest

== Lip syncs ==
Legend:

The contestant was eliminated after their first time in the bottom.
The contestant was eliminated after their second time in the bottom.
The eliminated contestant won a $2,500 mini-challenge Lip Sync in the finale.
The contestant won the first round of the Lip Sync Smackdown for the Crown and advanced to the second.
The contestant won the second round of the Lip Sync Smackdown for the Crown and was declared the winner of the season.

Episode	Bottom All Stars			Song	Eliminated
1	Jackie Cox	vs.	Nearah Nuff	"Where Is My Husband!" (Raye)	Jackie Cox
2	Makayla Couture	vs.	Pythia	"Trust!" (Rebecca Black)	Pythia
3	Juice Boxx	vs.	Tiffany Ann Co.	"Conga" (Miami Sound Machine)	Juice Boxx
4	Aurora Matrix	vs.	Makayla Couture	"Black Eye" (Allie X)	Makayla Couture
5	Nearah Nuff	vs.	Tiffany Ann Co.	"Into You" (Ariana Grande)	Tiffany Ann Co.
Episode	Eliminated All Stars			Song	Winner
6	Jackie Cox vs. Juice Boxx vs. Makayla Couture vs. Pythia vs. Tiffany Ann Co.			"The Queendom (JROB Remix)" (RuPaul)	Makayla Couture
6	Final All Stars			Song	Winner
6	Aurora Matrix	vs.	Sami Landri	"Man! I Feel Like a Woman!" (Shania Twain)	Aurora Matrix
6	Jada Shada Hudson	vs.	Nearah Nuff	"Cut to the Feeling" (Carly Rae Jepsen)	Nearah Nuff
6	Aurora Matrix	vs.	Nearah Nuff	"Perfect Celebrity" (Lady Gaga)	Aurora Matrix

== Voting history ==
	Episode			
	1	2	3	4
Bottom Three	Jackie; Juice; Nearah	Makayla; Pythia; Tiffany	Juice; Nearah; Tiffany	Aurora; Makayla; Tiffany
Aurora	Juice	Tiffany	Juice	Bottom 3
Jada	Jackie	Pythia	Nearah	Tiffany
Nearah	Bottom 3	Tiffany	Bottom 3	Tiffany
Sami	Jackie	Pythia	Nearah	Tiffany
Tiffany	Juice	Bottom 3	Bottom 3	Bottom 3
Makayla	Juice	Bottom 3	Tiffany	Bottom 3
Juice	Bottom 3	Tiffany	Bottom 3	
Pythia	Juice	Bottom 3		
Jackie	Bottom 3			
Golden Beaver	Juice; 4 of 6 votes to save	Tiffany; 3 of 5 votes to save	Nearah; 2 of 4 votes to save	Tiffany; 3 of 3 votes to save

== Guest judges ==
On June 22, the celebrity guest judges for this season were revealed.

- Kathy Griffin, comedian and actress
- Rebecca Black, singer-songwriter
- Christian Allaire, fashion journalist
- Robby Hoffman, actress
- Lemon, winner of Canada vs. the World season 2, and contestant from Canada's Drag Race season 1 and RuPaul's Drag Race: UK vs. the World series 1

=== Special guests ===
Guests who appeared in episodes, but did not judge on the main stage.

Episode 2

- Julia Grosso, Canadian professional soccer player

Episode 3

- Melinda Verga, contestant from Canada's Drag Race season 4 and RuPaul's Drag Race: UK vs. the World series 3
- Suki Doll, contestant and Miss Congeniality from Canada's Drag Race season 2 and Drag Race Philippines: Slaysian Royale

Episode 5

- Aleksandar Antonijevic, photographer

== Episodes ==
No.	Title	Original release date
1	"Miss Charisma, Uniqueness, Nerve, and Talent Pageant"	July 9, 2026
Nine all-stars enter the workroom. For the first main challenge, the queens present two looks for The Miss Charisma, Uniqueness, Nerve, and Talent Pageant: Swimsuit and Elegant Eveningwear, as well as performing a talent number.: Aurora Matrix - Silk Veil Poi/Traditional Dancing; Jackie Cox - Live Singing; Jada Shada Hudson - Dancing/Spoken Word; Juice Boxx - Deadlifting; Makayla Couture - Spoken Word; Nearah Nuff - Cup Stacking; Pythia - Comedy Performance; Sami Landri - Comedy Performance; Tiffany Ann Co. - Levitation Wand; On the runway, Brooke Lynn Hytes reveals that the Golden Beaver is back this season. However, instead of the challenge winner being given the power to save one of the bottom three queens from lip-syncing, all of the safe queens will vote anonymously for one of the bottom three queens to receive the Golden Beaver. The queen with the most votes will receive the Golden Beaver and be saved from the bottom two. Aurora Matrix, Pythia and Sami Landri receive positive critiques, with Pythia winning the challenge. Jackie Cox, Juice Boxx and Nearah Nuff receive negative critiques. After the Golden Beaver voting, it is revealed that Juice Boxx has received the Golden Beaver. Jackie Cox and Nearah Nuff lip-sync to "Where Is My Husband!" by Raye. Nearah Nuff wins the lip-sync and Jackie Cox is the first queen to sashay away.: Guest Judge: Kathy Griffin; Main Challenge: Present two looks for The Miss Charisma, Uniqueness, Nerve, and Talent Pageant, and perform a talent number; Runway Themes: Swimsuit and Elegant Eveningwear; Challenge Winner: Pythia; Challenge Prize: A $10,000 cash tip courtesy of Crews & Tangos and The Drink; Bottom Two: Jackie Cox and Nearah Nuff; Lip-Sync Song: "Where Is My Husband!" by Raye; Eliminated: Jackie Cox; Farewell Message: "Thank you for welcoming me HOME! Love, Jackie 💋"
2	"Song of the Summer"	July 16, 2026
For the mini-challenge, the queens play as a goalkeeper while blocking soccer balls. Nearah Nuff wins the mini-challenge. For the main challenge, the queens write, record, and perform verses to "Body Tea" and "Diva Down".: The Kitty Katz - Aurora Matrix, Juice Boxx, Nearah Nuff and Tiffany Ann Co. performing "Diva Down"; The Tea Bags - Jada Shada Hudson, Makayla Couture, Pythia and Sami Landri performing "Body Tea"; On the runway, category is Camp. Aurora Matrix and Jada Shada Hudson receive positive critiques, with Aurora Matrix winning the challenge. Makayla Couture, Pythia and Tiffany Ann Co. receive negative critiques. After the Golden Beaver voting, it is revealed that Tiffany Ann Co. has received the Golden Beaver. Makayla Couture and Pythia lip-sync to "Trust!" by Rebecca Black. Makayla Couture wins the lip-sync and Pythia sashays away.: Guest Judge: Rebecca Black; Mini-Challenge: Play as a goalkeeper while blocking soccer balls; Mini-Challenge Winner: Nearah Nuff; Mini-Challenge Prize: A $2,500 cash tip courtesy of BMO; Main Challenge: Write, record, and perform verses to "Body Tea" and "Diva Down"; Runway Theme: Camp; Challenge Winner: Aurora Matrix; Challenge Prize: A $10,000 cash tip courtesy of Cedars Campground; Bottom Two: Makayla Couture and Pythia; Lip-Sync Song: "Trust!" by Rebecca Black; Eliminated: Pythia; Farewell Message: "YOU'RE WELCOME ;)"
3	"The Design Auction"	July 23, 2026
For this week's mini-challenge, the queens do a polygraph test administered by Jimbo and Melinda Verga. Tiffany Ann Co. wins the mini-challenge. For the main challenge, the queens bid on items in an auction to help create an outfit.: Aurora Matrix - Feathers and Iced Coffee; Jada Shada Hudson - Animal Print and Denim; Juice Boxx - Sequins; Makayla Couture - A Time Freeze and Tulle; Nearah Nuff - Beads and a Design Consult with Suki Doll; Sami Landri - Metals; Tiffany Ann Co. - Rhinestones; On the runway, category is Looking Good, Feeling Gorgeous. Aurora Matrix and Jada Shada Hudson receive positive critiques, with Aurora Matrix winning the challenge. Juice Boxx, Nearah Nuff and Tiffany Ann Co. receive negative critiques. After the Golden Beaver voting, it is revealed that Nearah Nuff has received the Golden Beaver. Juice Boxx and Tiffany Ann Co. lip-sync to "Conga" by Miami Sound Machine. Tiffany Ann Co. wins the lip-sync and Juice Boxx sashays away.: Guest Judge: Christian Allaire; Mini-Challenge: Polygraph test administered by Jimbo and Melinda Verga; Mini-Challenge Winner: Tiffany Ann Co.; Mini-Challenge Prize: A $2,500 cash tip courtesy of Safer Six Sexual Health Clinic; Main Challenge: Bid on items in an auction to help create an outfit; Runway Theme: Looking Good, Feeling Gorgeous; Challenge Winner: Aurora Matrix; Challenge Prize: A $10,000 cash tip courtesy of Travel Manitoba; Bottom Two: Juice Boxx and Tiffany Ann Co.; Lip-Sync Song: "Conga" by Miami Sound Machine; Eliminated: Juice Boxx; Farewell Message: "3 week ain't bad. You're all All ★ Stars but... Team Aurora 😺"
4	"Drag Prime Minister"	July 30, 2026
For this week's mini-challenge, the queens pair up to create an outfit inspired by an outfit from a previous queen. Aurora Matrix and Makayla Couture win the mini-challenge. For the main challenge, the queens team up to write and star in political campaign advertisements.: Team 1 - Aurora Matrix, Makayla Couture and Nearah Nuff; Team 2 - Jada Shada Hudson, Sami Landri and Tiffany Ann Co.; On the runway, category is Lavender Haze. Jada Shada Hudson, Nearah Nuff and Sami Landri receive positive critiques, with Nearah Nuff winning the challenge. Aurora Matrix, Makayla Couture and Tiffany Ann Co. receive negative critiques. After the Golden Beaver voting, it is revealed that Tiffany Ann Co. has received the Golden Beaver. Aurora Matrix and Makayla lip-sync to "Black Eye" by Allie X. Aurora Matrix wins the lip-sync and Makayla Couture sashays away.: Guest Judge: Robby Hoffman; Mini-Challenge: In pairs, create an outfit inspired by an outfit from a previous queen; Mini-Challenge Winners: Aurora Matrix and Makayla Couture; Mini-Challenge Prize: A $1,250 cash tip each courtesy of PrEP Clinic; Main Challenge: In teams, write and star in political campaign advertisements; Runway Theme: Lavender Haze; Challenge Winner: Nearah Nuff; Challenge Prize: A $10,000 cash tip courtesy of Now Boarding Travel and Craig's Cookies; Bottom Two: Aurora Matrix and Makayla Couture; Lip-Sync Song: "Black Eye" by Allie X; Eliminated: Makayla Couture; Farewell Message: "Makayla Motha Fuckin Couture ♡💋"
5	"Win To Get In"	August 6, 2026
For this week's main challenge, the queens compete in the Charisma, Uniqueness, Nerve and Talent Contest (CUNTest), secure their spot in the Grand Finale through four different challenges. In the first challenge, the queens play the Snatch Game. Priyanka and Jimbo (as Joan Rivers) star as the celebrity contestants. The cast consisted of: Aurora Matrix - Olivia Chow; Jada Shada Hudson - Ts Madison; Nearah Nuff - Connor McDavid; Sami Landri - Celine Dion; Tiffany Ann Co. - Bretman Rock; After the Snatch Game, Sami Landri is announced as the winner of the challenge. In the second challenge, the queens do a dollhouse dollhouse inspired photoshoot. On the runway, category is Dollhouse. After the runway, Aurora Matrix is announced as the winner of the challenge. In the third challenge, the queens write, record, and perform verses to "Spotlight". After the performance, Jada Shada Hudson is announced as the winner of the challenge. For the last challenge, Nearah Nuff and Tiffany Ann Co. lip-sync to "Into You" by Ariana Grande. Nearah Nuff wins the lip-sync, and is announced as the winner of the challenge as well, and Tiffany Ann Co. sashays away.: Guest Judge: Lemon; Main Challenge #1: Snatch Game; Challenge #1 Winner: Sami Landri; Main Challenge #2: Do a dollhouse inspired photoshoot; Runway Theme: Dollhouse; Challenge #2 Winner: Aurora Matrix; Main Challenge #3: Write, record, and perform verses to "Spotlight"; Challenge #3 Winner: Jada Shada Hudson; Main Challenge #4: Lip-Sync for the Finale; Lip-Sync Song: "Into You" by Ariana Grande; Challenge #4 Winner: Nearah Nuff; Challenge Prize: a $2,500 cash tip each courtesy of Tryst Hotels; Eliminated: Tiffany Ann Co.; Farewell Message: "Congrats Bricks! 💋 love you."
6	"Crown Me, Canada!"	August 13, 2026
On the runway, category is Coronation Eleganza. The queens all return for a reunion. Brooke Lynn Hytes reveals that the eliminated queens will be participating in a mini-challenge, where all five must lip-sync to "Queendom (JROB Remix)" by RuPaul. As the song progresses, queens are eliminated; first Juice Boxx, then Pythia, then Jackie Cox, then Tiffany Ann Co. Makayla Couture wins the mini-challenge. The top 4 queens pick the song that they will perform for the first round of the final lip-sync smackdown; either Man! I Feel Like a Woman! by Shania Twain or Cut to the Feeling by Carly Rae Jepsen. Sami Landri and Aurora Matrix both choose "Man! I Feel Like a Woman!", leaving Nearah Nuff and Jada Shada Hudson with "Cut to the Feeling". After the top 4 queens return to the runway for their final performances, Juice Boxx is named Miss Congeniality. Aurora Matrix wins the lip-sync to "Man! I Feel Like a Woman!", and Sami Landri sashays away. Nearah Nuff wins the lip-sync to "Cut to the Feeling", and Jada Shada Hudson sashays away. For the final round, Aurora Matrix and Nearah Nuff lip-sync to "Perfect Celebrity" by Lady Gaga. It is announced that Aurora Matrix is the winner, leaving Nearah Nuff as the runner-up.: Runway Theme: Coronation Eleganza; Mini-Challenge: The eliminated queens compete in a "Lip-Sync For Your Pride"; Mini-Challenge Winner: Makayla Couture; Mini-Challenge Prize: $2,500 courtesy of The Men's Room; Miss Congeniality: Juice Boxx; Lip-Sync Smackdown #1: Sami Landri vs. Aurora Matrix; Lip-Sync Song: Man! I Feel Like a Woman! by Shania Twain; Eliminated: Sami Landri; Lip-Sync Smackdown #2: Nearah Nuff vs. Jada Shada Hudson; Lip-Sync Song: Cut to the Feeling by Carly Rae Jepsen; Eliminated: Jada Shada Hudson; Lip-Sync Smackdown #3: Aurora Matrix vs. Nearah Nuff; Lip-Sync Song: Perfect Celebrity by Lady Gaga; Runner-up: Nearah Nuff; Winner of Canada's Drag Race All Stars Season 1: Aurora Matrix
