= Christian Allaire =

Canadian fashion journalist

- Born: 1992 (age 33–34)
- Occupation: Fashion journalist

Christian Allaire (born 1992) is a Canadian fashion journalist, currently a fashion and style writer for Vogue.

== Early life ==
Allaire studied journalism at Toronto Metropolitan University.

== Career ==
He began as a freelance fashion journalist, working on various contracts for Vogue before his first bylined piece for the magazine was published in 2020.

In 2021, he published The Power of Style: How Fashion and Beauty Are Used to Reclaim Cultures, a non-fiction book about the importance of clothing and fashion as a tool of cultural preservation and revival in underrepresented cultural groups. The book was the winner of the Norma Fleck Award for children's and youth non-fiction literature in 2022.

In 2022, he appeared on Canada Reads, advocating for Michelle Good's novel Five Little Indians. The novel won the competition.

In 2023, he appeared as a guest judge in the fourth season of Canada's Drag Race, and he returned in 2026 as a guest judge in the first season of Canada's Drag Race All Stars.

== Personal life ==
Allaire is of mixed Ojibwe (mother) and French-Canadian and Italian (father) descent and is a member of the Nipissing First Nation, Ontario.
