= Aimee Yonce Shennel =

Dominican-Canadian drag performer

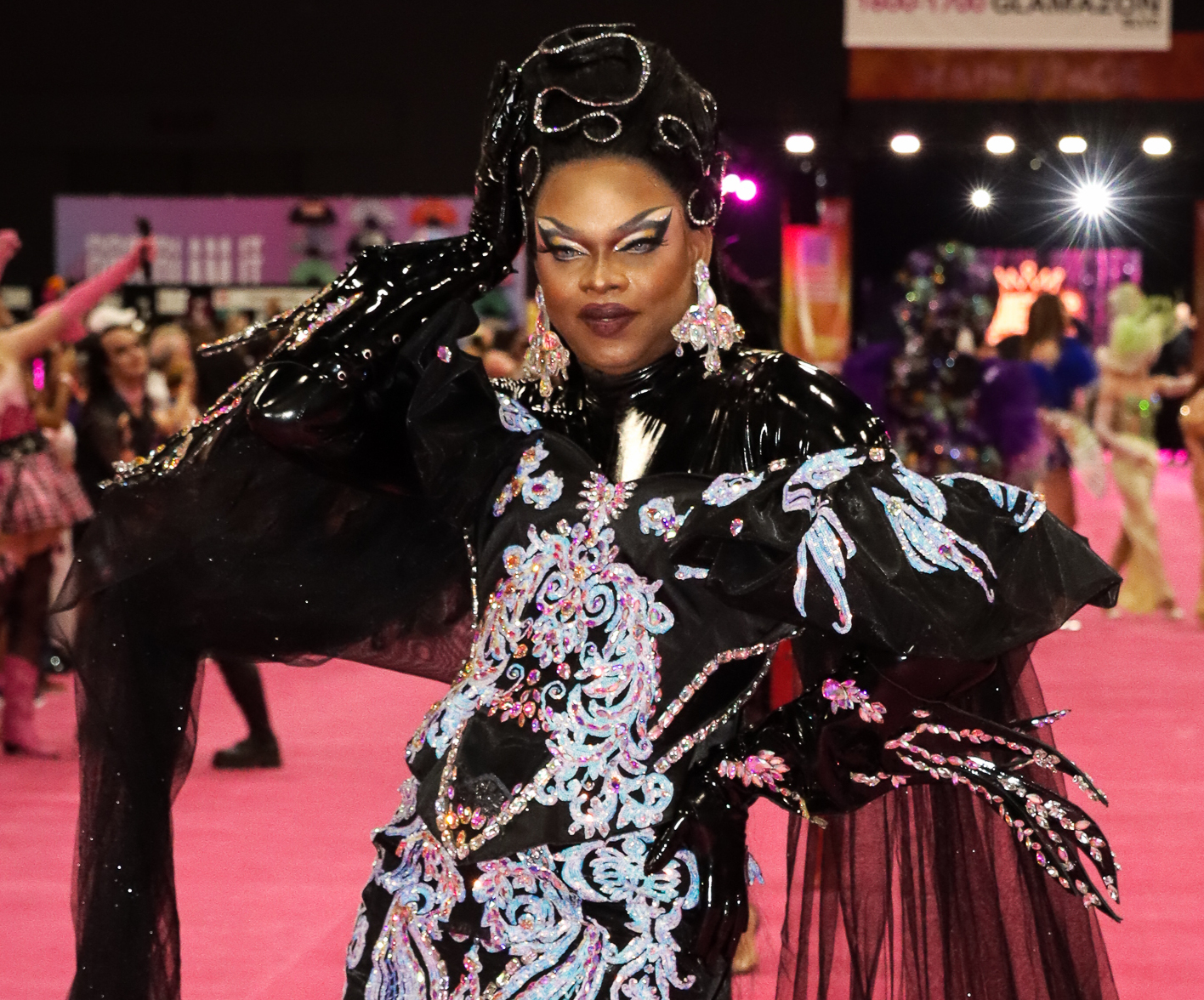
- Aimee Yonce Shennel at RuPaul's DragCon LA, 2024
- Born: Dominican Republic
- Occupation: Drag queen
- Television: Canada's Drag Race (season 4)

Aimee Yonce Shennel is the stage name of Lorena Aimee Domínguez, a Dominican-Canadian drag performer who competed on season 4 of Canada's Drag Race.

== Career ==
Aimee Yonce Shennel is a drag performer based in Ottawa. She was named Miss Capital Pride in 2022 and has won other local awards including Drag of the Year, Fan Favourite Drag Artist, and Performance of the Year. In 2022, she was featured in the Queer Black Excellence Showcase, along with Kendall Gender.

Aimee Yonce Shennel competed on season 4 of Canada's Drag Race, which premiered in 2023. On the fourth episode, she placed in the bottom two of a design challenge and had to lip sync to "Come Through" by Priyanka featuring Lemon, against Nearah Nuff; both contestants were spared elimination by the judges. On the fifth episode, Aimee Yonce Shennel impersonated Jesus for the Snatch Game challenge. She and Kitten Kaboodle were eliminated by the sixth episode's "Slay-Off" lip sync tournament.

== Personal life ==
Aimee Yonce Shennel was raised in Santo Domingo, Dominican Republic. She relocated to Canada in 2016 and has since become a naturalized citizen of the country. She is based in Ottawa, Ontario, and started drag there in 2017. She is Afro-Latina. On August 25, 2025 Aimee Yonce Shennel publicly came out as a transgender woman, having come out 6 months prior.

== Filmography ==
- Canada's Drag Race (season 4)
- Bring Back My Girls (2024)
