= Snatch Game: The Rusical =

- Canada's Drag Race: Canada vs. the World episode
- Episode no.: Season 2 Episode 5
- Original air date: August 16, 2024

Guest appearances
- Alessia Cara; Sarain Fox; Hollywood Jade

Episode chronology
← Previous "Reading Battles"	Next → "Grand Finale"

"Snatch Game: The Rusical" is the fifth episode of the second season of the Canadian television series Canada's Drag Race: Canada vs. the World. It originally aired on August 16, 2024. Alessia Cara and Sarain Fox are guest judges, and Hollywood Jade is a guest choreographer.

Lemon wins the episode's main challenge, which tasks contestants with performing in a Rusical about the Snatch Game. Miss Fiercalicious is eliminated from the competition, after placing in the bottom two and losing a lip-sync contest against Alexis Mateo. The episode received one award from four nominations at the 13th Canadian Screen Awards.

== Episode ==
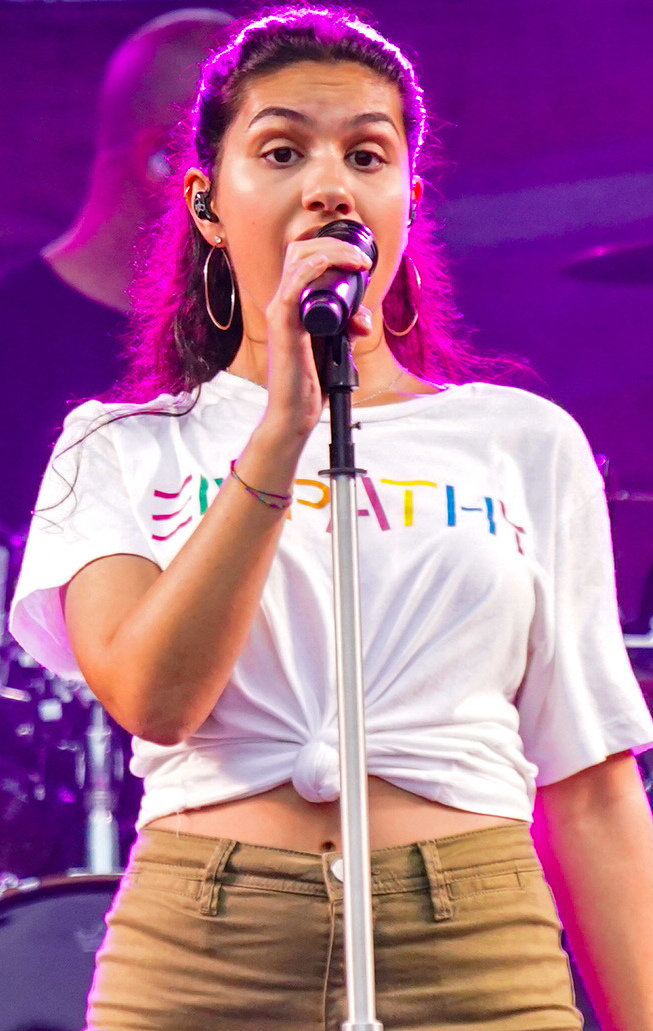
Alessia Cara is a guest judge.

The remaining contestants return to the Werk Room after Eureka's elimination from the competition. On a new day, Brook Lynn Hytes greets the contestants and reveals the main challenge, which tasks contestants with performing in a Rusical (musical theatre challenge) inspired by the Snatch Game challenge. Contestants must sing and dance while impersonating celebrities. Following are the roles:

- Alexis Mateo as Ron DeSantis (as a baby)
- Cheryl as Queen Victoria
- Kennedy Davenport as Tabitha Brown
- Lemon as Susan Boyle
- Miss Fiercalicious as Mother Teresa

Brook Lynn Hytes meets with the contestants to discuss their planned impersonations. On the main stage, the contestants rehearse choreography with Hollywood Jade and two other dancers. Back on the Werk Room, the contestants prepare for the Rusical and the fashion show. The contestants discuss their families and companions. Alexis Mateo describes a lack of a support system, apart from her "drag family".

On the main stage, Brook Lynn Hytes welcomes fellow judges Brad Goreski and Sarain Fox, as well as guest judge Alessia Cara. The contestants perform the Rusical. The runway category is "Summer of '69". Cheryl and Lemon receive positive critiques and Lemon wins the challenge. Alexis Mateo, Kennedy Davenport, and Miss Fiercalicious receive negative critiques and are named the bottom three contestants. Lemon uses the Golden Beaver to save Kennedy Davenport from the bottom two. Alexis Mateo and Miss Fiercalicious face off in a lip-sync contest to "How Far I'll Go (Alessia Cara Version)" by Alessia Cara. Alexis Mateo wins the lip-sync and Miss Fiercalicious is eliminated from the competition.

== Production ==
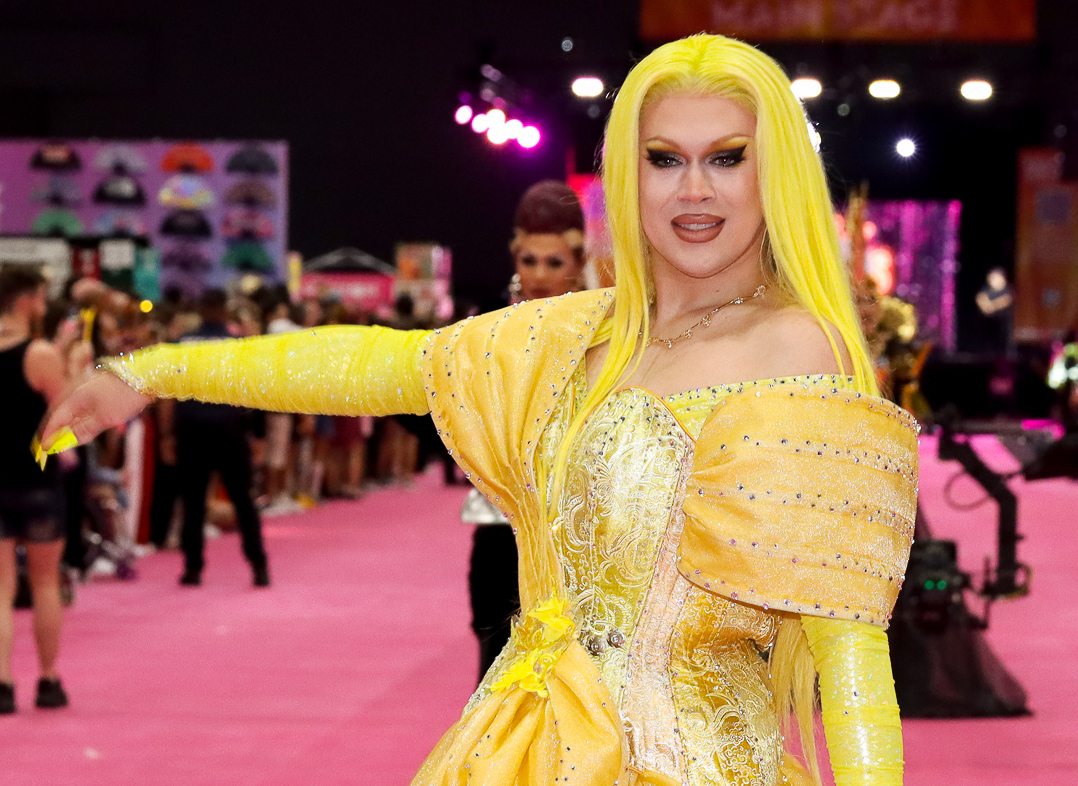
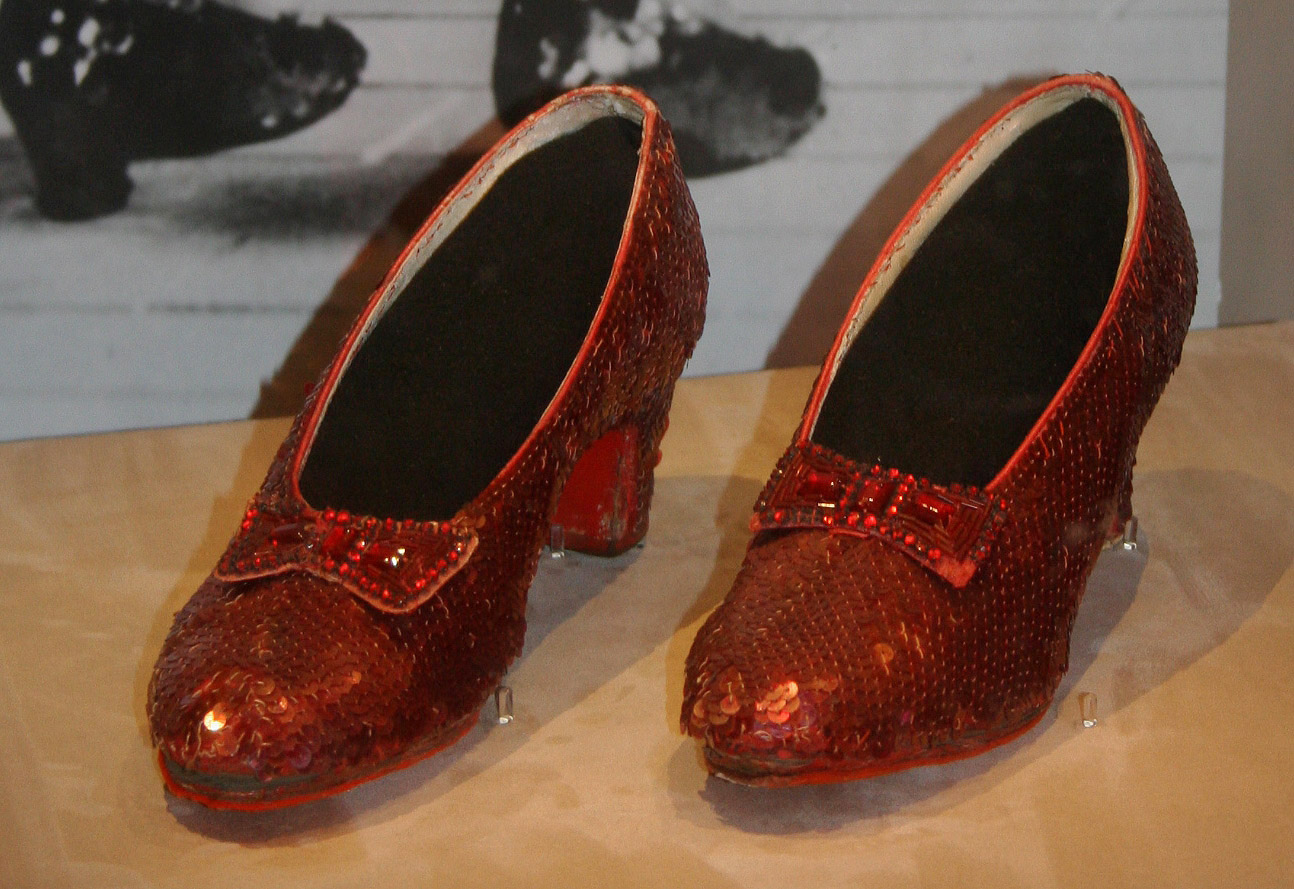
Lemon (top, pictured in 2024) wins the main challenge; for the fashion show, she wears red shoes inspired by the ruby slippers (bottom, pictured at the Smithsonian Institution) worn by Judy Garland as Dorothy Gale in The Wizard of Oz.

The episode originally aired on August 16, 2024.

=== Fashion ===
For the fashion show, Alexia Mateo wears an outfit inspired by American actress Priscilla Presley. Lemon's look is a black-and-white checkered dress and red shoes, inspired by the ruby slippers worn by Judy Garland as Dorothy Gale in The Wizard of Oz. Miss Fiercalicious wears an extraterrestrial-inspired outfit. Kennedy Davenport wears a yellow dress with pink shoes and stockings. She carries yellow sunglasses and has a large afro. Cheryl presents a 1960s-inspired silhouette and she carries a purse.

== Reception and recognition ==
The episode received four nominations at the 13th Canadian Screen Awards. Joey Sadler was nominated in the category "Best photography, lifestyle or reality/competition". John Diemer, Scott Brachmayer, Rosie Eberhard, Levi Linton, Dane Kelly, Rob Taylor, Eric Leigh and Alastair Sims won in the category "Best sound, lifestyle, reality, or entertainment". Shelagh O'Brien was nominated in the category "Best direction, reality/competition". Brandon Ash-Mohammed, Trevor Boris and Spencer Fritz were nominated in the category "Lifestyle or reality/competition program or series".

In 2025, Barry Levitt ranked Snatch Game: The Rusical number 31 in Vulture's list of Rusicals to date, writing: "Credit where it’s due: This is the most audacious of any Rusical in franchise history. Combining two marquee challenges is a bold choice and proves to be an extremely tall task for the queens... Some of the numbers are great: Lemon (as Susan Boyle) demolishes, and Cheryl (as Queen Victoria) delivers a terrific ballad, but the facades of their Snatch Game characters are dropped when singing. You have to respect the Canadian franchise for thinking outside the box. They probably shouldn’t try it again, though." Kevin O'Keeffe of Xtra Magazine said the episode's Rusical was among variants of the Snatch Game that have "fallen flat".

== See also ==
- Cultural depictions of Queen Victoria
- Judy Garland as a gay icon
- List of Canada's Drag Race episodes
