= Luna DuBois =

Nigerian-Canadian drag performer and make-up artist

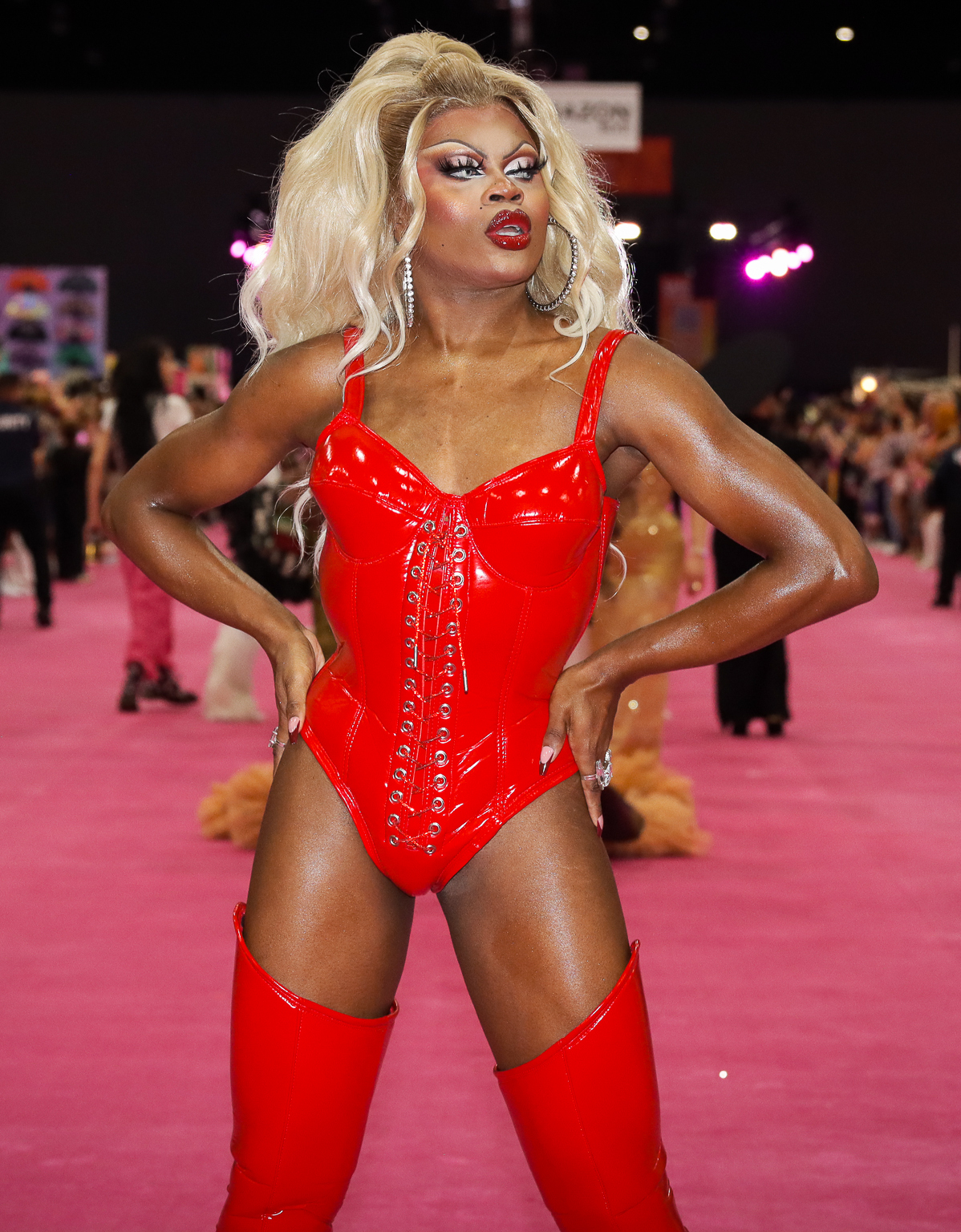
- DuBois at RuPaul's DragCon LA, 2024
- Born: Tom VanDyne; Lagos, Nigeria
- Occupations: Drag queen; make-up artist
- Television: Canada's Drag Race (season 4)
- Website: lunadubois.com

Luna DuBois is the stage name of Tom VanDyne, a Nigerian-Canadian drag performer and make-up artist who competed on season 4 of Canada's Drag Race.

== Early life ==
Tom VanDyne was born in Lagos, Nigeria, and moved to Canada.

== Career ==
VanDyne is a drag performer and make-up artist with a background in fashion design. Luna DuBois is his drag persona. He "works with BIPOC performers and makes sure they are treated fairly".

In 2020, during the COVID-19 pandemic, Luna DuBois was among the performers in Queer Pride Inside, an online event hosted by Elvira Kurt in collaboration with CBC Gem and Buddies in Bad Times.

Luna DuBois competed on season 4 of Canada's Drag Race. She was the first Nigerian contestant on the show. On the second episode, Luna DuBois placed in the bottom two and defeated Sisi Superstar in a lip-sync to "I'm with You" (2002) by Avril Lavigne. On the fifth episode, Luna DuBois impersonated Mary Cosby of The Real Housewives of Salt Lake City for the Snatch Game challenge. She placed in the bottom two again, and lost a lip-sync against Aurora Matrix to "She's All I Wanna Be" (2022) by Tate McRae.

== Personal life ==
VanDyne is based in Toronto, and uses the pronouns she/her in drag and he/him out of drag.

== Filmography ==
- Canada's Drag Race (season 4)
- Bring Back My Girls (2024)
