= Canada's Drag Race season 4 =

2023–2024 season of Canada's Drag Race

Canada's Drag Race
- Season 4
- Promotional poster for season four
- Hosted by: Brooke Lynn Hytes
- Judges: Brooke Lynn Hytes; Brad Goreski; Traci Melchor
- No. of contestants: 11
- Winner: Venus
- Runner-up: Aurora Matrix
- Miss Congeniality: Kitten Kaboodle
- No. of episodes: 9

Release
- Original network: Crave (Canada); BBC Three (United Kingdom); WOW Presents Plus (International)
- Original release: November 16, 2023 – January 11, 2024

Season chronology
- ← Previous; Season 3 Next → Season 5

The fourth season of Canada's Drag Race premiered on November 16, 2023 and concluded on January 11, 2024. The season aired on Crave in Canada, BBC Three in the United Kingdom, and on WOW Presents Plus internationally.

The winner of the fourth season of Canada's Drag Race was Venus, with Aurora Matrix as runner-up.

== Production ==
Crave announced that the series was renewed for a fourth season in November 2022, with a casting call taking place from November 1 to 22. Brooke Lynn Hytes, Brad Goreski, and Traci Melchor returned as judges for the season.

Eleven contestants were announced on October 18, 2023, with a premiere for the season slated for November 16. Crave teased the season's guest judges through an Instagram post on November 1, 2023.

== Contestants ==
Canada's Drag Race season 4 contestants and their backgrounds (Note: All ages, names, with hometowns, and outcome are stated at time of filming.)
| Contestant | Age | Hometown | Outcome |
|---|---|---|---|
| Venus | 27 | Vancouver, British Columbia | Winner |
| Aurora Matrix | 22 | Toronto, Ontario | Runner-up |
| Denim | 24 | Montreal, Quebec | 3rd place |
| Nearah Nuff | 22 | Calgary, Alberta | 3rd place |
| Melinda Verga | 44 | Edmonton, Alberta | 5th place |
| Kiki Coe | 35 | Ottawa, Ontario | 6th place |
| Aimee Yonce Shennel | 31 | Ottawa, Ontario | 7th place (Note: Kitten Kaboodle was voted Miss Congeniality on the official Canada's Drag Race Instagram page after the finale aired.) |
| Kitten Kaboodle | 57 | Toronto, Ontario | 7th place |
| Luna DuBois | 24 | Toronto, Ontario | 9th place |
| The Girlfriend Experience | 31 | Vancouver, British Columbia | 10th place |
| Sisi Superstar | 31 | Montreal, Quebec | 11th place |

Footnotes

== Contestant progress ==
Legend:

Venus won Canada's Drag Race season 4.
Aurora Matrix was the runner-up.
Kitten Kaboodle was voted Miss Congeniality (Miss C) after the show aired.
WIN indicates that the contestant won the challenge.
TOP2 indicates that the contestant was one of the two best performing in the challenge, but lost the lip sync to win it.
SAFE indicates that the contestant was declared safe by the judges.
BVR (Beaver) indicates that the contestant received the Golden Beaver and was saved from the bottom two.
BTM (Bottom) indicates that the contestant was up for elimination.
ELIM (Eliminated) indicates that the contestant was eliminated.
Guest indicates that the contestant returned as a guest.

Contestants progress with placements in each episode
| Contestant | Episode | | | | | | | | |
| Contestant | 1 | 2 | 3 | 4 | 5 | 6 | 7 | 8 | 9 |
|---|---|---|---|---|---|---|---|---|---|
| Venus | WIN | SAFE | SAFE | SAFE | SAFE | SAFE | SAFE | SAFE | Winner |
| Aurora Matrix | SAFE | SAFE | WIN | SAFE | BTM | TOP2 | WIN | SAFE | Runner-up |
| Denim | TOP2 | SAFE | SAFE | SAFE | SAFE | BVR | BTM | WIN | Eliminated |
| Nearah Nuff | SAFE | SAFE | SAFE | BTM | SAFE | WIN | SAFE | BTM | Eliminated |
| Melinda Verga | SAFE | SAFE | SAFE | BVR | WIN | SAFE | SAFE | ELIM | Guest |
| Kiki Coe | SAFE | SAFE | BVR | WIN | BVR | BTM | ELIM | | Guest |
| Aimee Yonce Shennel | SAFE | SAFE | SAFE | BTM | SAFE | ELIM | | | Guest |
| Kitten Kaboodle | SAFE | WIN | BTM | SAFE | SAFE | ELIM | | | Miss C |
| Luna DuBois | SAFE | BTM | SAFE | SAFE | ELIM | | | | Guest |
| The Girlfriend Experience | SAFE | BVR | ELIM | | | | | | Guest |
| Sisi Superstar | SAFE | ELIM | | | | | | | Guest |

== Lip syncs ==
Legend:

The contestant won the lip sync to win the challenge.
The contestant was eliminated after their first time in the bottom.
The contestant was eliminated after their second time in the bottom.
The contestant won the first round of the Lip Sync Slay Off and advanced to the next round.
The contestant won the second round of the Lip Sync Slay Off and advanced to the final round.
The contestant won the Lip Sync for the Crown and was declared the winner of the season.

| Episode | Contestants | | | Song | Winner |
|---|---|---|---|---|---|
| 1 | Denim | vs. | Venus | "Feel It in My Bones" (Tiësto ft. Tegan and Sara) | Venus |
| Episode | Contestants | | | Song | Eliminated |
| 2 | Luna DuBois | vs. | Sisi Superstar | "I'm with You" (Avril Lavigne) | Sisi Superstar |
| 3 | Kitten Kaboodle | vs. | The Girlfriend Experience | "Tongue" (Rêve) | The Girlfriend Experience |
| 4 | Aimee Yonce Shennel | vs. | Nearah Nuff | "Come Through" (Priyanka ft. Lemon) | None |
| 5 | Aurora Matrix | vs. | Luna DuBois | "She's All I Wanna Be" (Tate McRae) | Luna DuBois |
| Episode | Contestants | | | Song | Winner |
| 6 | Kitten Kaboodle | vs. | Melinda Verga | "That Don't Impress Me Much (Dance Mix)" (Shania Twain) | Melinda Verga |
| 6 | Aurora Matrix | vs. | Denim | "I'm Not Here to Make Friends" (Sam Smith, Calvin Harris, Jessie Reyez) | Aurora Matrix |
| 6 | Aimee Yonce Shennel | vs. | Nearah Nuff | "Fever Dreamer" (SG Lewis ft. Charlotte Day Wilson, Channel Tres) | Nearah Nuff |
| 6 | Kiki Coe | vs. | Venus | "Uninvited" (Alanis Morissette) | Venus |
| 6 | Aurora Matrix | vs. | Melinda Verga | "Boys Wanna Be Her" (Peaches) | Aurora Matrix |
| 6 | Nearah Nuff | vs. | Venus | "Pull Up" (Keys N Krates ft. Haviah Mighty) | Nearah Nuff |
| 6 | Aurora Matrix | vs. | Nearah Nuff | "Black Velvet" (Alannah Myles) | Nearah Nuff |
| 6 | Contestants | | | Song | Eliminated |
| 6 | Aimee Yonce Shennel vs. Kiki Coe vs. Kitten Kaboodle | | | "I Will Love Again" (Lara Fabian) | Aimee Yonce Shennel |
| 6 | Aimee Yonce Shennel vs. Kiki Coe vs. Kitten Kaboodle | | | "I Will Love Again" (Lara Fabian) | Kitten Kaboodle |
| 7 | Denim | vs. | Kiki Coe | "Seven Day Fool" (Jully Black) | Kiki Coe |
| 8 | Melinda Verga | vs. | Nearah Nuff | "I Didn't Just Come Here to Dance" (Carly Rae Jepsen) | Melinda Verga |
| Episode | Final contestants | | | Song | Winner |
| 9 | Aurora Matrix | vs. | Venus | "Try" (Nelly Furtado) | Venus |

== Golden Beaver ==
Legend:

The contestant won the Maxi Challenge and possessed the Golden Beaver to save one of the bottom queens.
The contestant received the power of the Golden Beaver and was saved from the bottom.

| Episode | Beaver Gifter | Bottom Queens | Saved |
|---|---|---|---|
| 2 | Kitten Kaboodle | Luna DuBois, Sisi Superstar and The Girlfriend Experience | The Girlfriend Experience |
| 3 | Aurora Matrix | Kiki Coe, Kitten Kaboodle and The Girlfriend Experience | Kiki Coe |
| 4 | Kiki Coe | Aimee Yonce Shennel, Melinda Verga and Nearah Nuff | Melinda Verga |
| 5 | Melinda Verga | Aurora Matrix, Kiki Coe and Luna DuBois | Kiki Coe |
| 6 | Nearah Nuff | Aimee Yonce Shennel, Denim, Kiki Coe and Kitten Kaboodle | Denim |

== Guest judges ==
On November 1, 2022, the judges for the fourth season were announced. Brooke Lynn Hytes, Brad Goreski, and Traci Melchor remain behind the judging table. The season also includes several guest judges:

- Tegan and Sara, indie rock/indie pop duo
- Ra'Jah O'Hara, contestant from RuPaul's Drag Race Season 11, runner-up of All Stars 6, and winner of Canada vs. the World Season 1
- Rêve, singer-songwriter
- Christian Allaire, Ojibwe writer and fashion journalist
- Jaida Essence Hall, winner of RuPaul's Drag Race Season 12 and contestant from All Stars 7
- Winnie Harlow, model
- Luann de Lesseps, model and television personality
- Sarain Fox, activist
- Nelly Furtado, singer-songwriter

=== Special guests ===
Guests who appeared in episodes, but did not judge on the main stage.

Episode 3

- John Diemer, recording engineer

Episode 4

- Aleksandar Antonijevic, photographer

Episode 7

- Hollywood Jade, dancer and choreographer

Episode 9

- Gisèle Lullaby, winner of Canada's Drag Race Season 3
- Aleksandar Antonijevic, photographer
- Hollywood Jade, dancer and choreographer

== Episodes ==
| No. overall | No. in season | Title | Original release date |
|---|---|---|---|
| 30 | 1 | "Premiere Ball" | November 16, 2023 |
Eleven new queens enter the workroom. Based on their entrance looks each judge gives one queen a Rosebud for being their standout, with Aimee Yonce Shennel, Denim, and Venus receiving them. For the first main challenge, the queens present three looks: First Impressions, Shimmering Showgirls and Me Myself and I. On the runway, category is Me Myself and I. Denim, Kiki Coe and Venus receive positive critiques. Melinda Verga, Nearah Nuff and Sisi Superstar receive negative critiques. It is then announced that Denim and Venus are the top two queens of the week and will lip-sync for the win. They lip-sync to "Feel It in My Bones" by Tiësto ft. Tegan and Sara. After the lip-sync, Venus is announced as the winner of the challenge. Brooke Lynn Hytes then announces that no one is going home.: Guest Judges: Tegan and Sara; Main Challenge: Present three looks: First Impressions, Shimmering Showgirls and Me Myself and I; Runway Theme: Me Myself and I; Top Two: Denim and Venus; Lip-Sync Song: "Feel It in My Bones" by Tiësto ft. Tegan and Sara; Challenge Winner: Venus; Challenge Prize: A $5,000 cash tip courtesy of Fabricland; Eliminated: None
| 31 | 2 | "QV-She" | November 23, 2023 |
For this week's main challenge, the queens team up to advertise a drag look product as a host on the shopping channel parody "QV-She".: The Shade Blockers - Denim, Kiki Coe and Sisi Superstar; The Fierce Flats - Kitten Kaboodle and Melinda Verga; The Tit Tips - Aurora Matrix, The Girlfriend Experience and Venus; The Party Poncho - Aimee Yonce Shennel, Luna DuBois and Nearah Nuff; On the runway, category is Gemstones. Kitten Kaboodle, Melinda Verga and Venus receive positive critiques, with Kitten Kaboodle winning the challenge. Luna DuBois, Sisi Superstar and The Girlfriend Experience receive negative critiques. Brooke Lynn Hytes then announces that the winner of each challenge moving forward, will win the Golden Beaver. The recipient will get the power to save one of the bottom three queens from lip-syncing. Kitten Kaboodle saved The Girlfriend Experience from the bottom two. Luna DuBois and Sisi Superstar lip-sync to "I'm with You" by Avril Lavigne. Luna DuBois wins the lip-sync and Sisi Superstar is the first queen to sashay away.: Guest Judge: Ra'Jah O'Hara; Main Challenge: In teams, advertise a drag look product as a host on the shopping channel parody "QV-She"; Runway Theme: Gemstones; Challenge Winner: Kitten Kaboodle; Challenge Prize: A $5,000 cash tip courtesy of So Fierce Music; Bottom Two: Luna DuBois and Sisi Superstar; Lip-Sync Song: "I'm with You" by Avril Lavigne; Eliminated: Sisi Superstar; Farewell Message: "Hey girls. I love you all so much. PS, Denim, bring the crown home. DADLE DOO"
| 32 | 3 | "OH-SHE-GAGGIN" | November 30, 2023 |
For this week's mini-challenge, the queens get into quick drag and interview as an actress for a parody film. Melinda Verga wins the mini-challenge. For the main challenge, the queens write, record, and perform verses for the OH-SHE-GAGGIN music festival.: Team The Love Bugs - Aurora Matrix, Denim, Luna DuBois, Nearah Nuff and Venus; Team The Vixens - Aimee Yonce Shennel, Kiki Coe, Kitten Kaboodle, Melinda Verga and The Girlfriend Experience; On the runway, category is Sunglasses at Night. Aimee Yonce Shennel, Aurora Matrix and Denim receive positive critiques, with Aurora Matrix winning the challenge. Kiki Coe, Kitten Kaboodle and The Girlfriend Experience receive negative critiques. Aurora Matrix uses the Golden Beaver to save Kiki Coe from the bottom two. Kitten Kaboodle and The Girlfriend Experience lip-sync to "Tongue" by Rêve. Kitten Kaboodle wins the lip-sync and The Girlfriend Experience sashays away.: Guest Judge: Rêve; Mini-Challenge: Get into quick drag and interview as an actress for a parody film; Mini-Challenge Winner: Melinda Verga; Mini-Challenge Prize: A $2,500 cash tip courtesy of Tan on the Run; Main Challenge: Write, record, and perform verses for the OH-SHE-GAGGIN music festival; Runway Theme: Sunglasses at Night; Challenge Winner: Aurora Matrix; Challenge Prize: A $5,000 cash tip and a year supply of cookies courtesy of Craig's Cookies; Bottom Two: Kitten Kaboodle and The Girlfriend Experience; Lip-Sync Song: "Tongue" by Rêve; Eliminated: The Girlfriend Experience; Farewell Message: "My beautiful sisters, carry your hearts through this competition it will carry you all with Me! I'll be cheering ❤️ You're my family and hold a place no one ever can take. See you on the other side. PS. forever the Prettiest ❤️💋"
| 33 | 4 | "Out of the Closet" | December 7, 2023 |
For this week's mini-challenge, the queens do a metallic photoshoot. Nearah Nuff wins the mini-challenge. For the main challenge, the queens create a look using Brad Goreski's hand-me-downs. On the runway, category is Out of the Closet. Denim, Kiki Coe and Kitten Kaboodle receive positive critiques, with Kiki Coe winning the challenge. Aimee Yonce Shennel, Melinda Verga and Nearah Nuff receive negative critiques. Kiki Coe uses the Golden Beaver to save Melinda Verga from the bottom two. Aimee Yonce Shennel and Nearah Nuff lip-sync to "Come Through" by Priyanka ft. Lemon. Both queens win the lip-sync and no one goes home.: Guest Judge: Christian Allaire; Mini-Challenge: Metallic photoshoot; Mini-Challenge Winner: Nearah Nuff; Mini-Challenge Prize: A $2,000 cash tip and a supply of GOT2B products; Main Challenge: Create a look using Brad Goreski's hand-me-downs; Runway Theme: Out of the Closet; Challenge Winner: Kiki Coe; Challenge Prize: A $5,000 cash tip courtesy of Swish Embassy; Bottom Two: Aimee Yonce Shennel and Nearah Nuff; Lip-Sync Song: "Come Through" by Priyanka ft. Lemon; Eliminated: None
| 34 | 5 | "Snatch Game" | December 14, 2023 |
For this week's mini-challenge, the queens read each other to filth. Denim wins the mini-challenge. For the main challenge, the queens play the Snatch Game. Brad Goreski and Traci Melchor star as the celebrity contestants. The cast consisted of: Aimee Yonce Shennel as Jesus Christ; Aurora Matrix as Zhao Bing; Denim as Julia Fox; Kiki Coe as Elizabeth Taylor; Kitten Kaboodle as Jennifer Coolidge; Luna DuBois as Mary Cosby; Melinda Verga as Manny Pacquiao; Nearah Nuff as Jennifer Coolidge; Venus as Joe Exotic; On the runway, category is Steampunk. Kitten Kaboodle, Melinda Verga and Venus receive positive critiques, with Melinda Verga winning the challenge. Aurora Matrix, Kiki Coe and Luna DuBois receive negative critiques. Melinda Verga uses the Golden Beaver to save Kiki Coe from the bottom two. Aurora Matrix and Luna DuBois lip-sync to "She's All I Wanna Be" by Tate McRae. Aurora Matrix wins the lip-sync and Luna DuBois sashays away.: Guest Judge: Jaida Essence Hall; Mini-Challenge: Reading is Fundamental; Mini-Challenge Winner: Denim; Mini-Challenge Prize: A $2,500 cash tip courtesy of the Men's Room; Main Challenge: Snatch Game; Runway Theme: Steampunk; Challenge Winner: Melinda Verga; Challenge Prize: A $5,000 shopping spree at Shoefreaks; Bottom Two: Aurora Matrix and Luna DuBois; Lip-Sync Song: "She's All I Wanna Be" by Tate McRae; Eliminated: Luna DuBois; Farewell Message: "I love you all so much! Y'all finally got rid of me, I forgive you Aurora! xo Y'all will never be shadier than me! LOL xo L.D"
| 35 | 6 | "Lip Sync Slay Offs" | December 21, 2023 |
For this week's main challenge, the queens participate in a lip-sync slay off extravaganza. The winner of each lip-sync will continue on, and the loser will be put in the bottom. This continues on until one queen is announced the winner of the challenge. The winner will then choose one of the bottom four queens to save with the golden beaver. The bottom three queens will then lip-sync one last time to determine which two queens will be eliminated. In the first round, Kitten Kaboodle and Melinda Verga lip-sync to "That Don't Impress Me Much (Dance Mix)" by Shania Twain. Melinda Verga wins the lip-sync and Kitten Kaboodle loses. Aurora Matrix and Denim then lip-sync to "I'm Not Here to Make Friends" by Sam Smith, Calvin Harris and Jessie Reyez. Aurora Matrix wins the lip-sync and Denim loses. Aimee Yonce Shennel and Nearah Nuff then lip-sync to "Fever Dreamer" by SG Lewis ft. Charlotte Day Wilson and Channel Tres. Nearah Nuff wins the lip-sync and Aimee Yonce Shennel loses. Kiki Coe and Venus then lip-sync to "Uninvited" by Alanis Morissette. Venus wins the lip-sync and Kiki Coe loses. In the second round, Aurora Matrix and Melinda Verga lip-sync to "Boys Wanna Be Her" by Peaches. Aurora Matrix wins the lip-sync and Melinda Verga loses. Nearah Nuff and Venus then lip-sync to "Pull Up" by Keys N Krates ft. Haviah Mighty. Nearah Nuff wins the lip-sync and Venus loses. In the final round, Aurora Matrix and Nearah Nuff lip-sync to "Black Velvet" by Alannah Myles. After the lip-sync, it is announced that Nearah Nuff is the winner of the challenge. Nearah Nuff uses the Golden Beaver to save Denim from the bottom three. Aimee Yonce Shennel, Kiki Coe and Kitten Kaboodle lip-sync to "I Will Love Again" by Lara Fabian. Kiki Coe wins the lip-sync and Aimee Yonce Shennel and Kitten Kaboodle both sashay away.: Guest Judge: Winnie Harlow; Main Challenge: Participate in a lip-sync slay off extravaganza; Challenge Winner: Nearah Nuff; Challenge Prize: A trip to Puerto Vallarta, Mexico; Bottom Three: Aimee Yonce Shennel, Kiki Coe and Kitten Kaboodle; Lip-Sync Song: "I Will Love Again" by Lara Fabian; Eliminated: Aimee Yonce Shennel and Kitten Kaboodle; Aimee Yonce Shennel's Farewell Message: "Jesus loves you all xoxo 💋 Aimee ❤️❤️❤️"; Kitten Kaboodle's Farewell Message: "Love you all my horrible little monsters! Play nice in the sandbox! Love xoxo KK 💋"
| 36 | 7 | "From Drags to Riches: The Rusical" | December 28, 2023 |
For this week's mini-challenge, the queens get into quick drag and host a parody late night call-in show called "Just A Tip". Venus wins the mini-challenge. For the main challenge, the queens perform in From Drags to Riches: The Rusical.: Aurora Matrix plays Dancer Brooke Lynn; Denim plays Brooke Lynn the Judge; Kiki Coe plays Amateur Drag Queen Brooke Lynn; Melinda Verga plays Young Brooke Lynn; Nearah Nuff plays Brooke Lynn on RuPaul's Drag Race; Venus plays Runner-up Brooke Lynn; On the runway, category is Always a Bridesmaid. Aurora Matrix, Nearah Nuff and Venus receive positive critiques, with Aurora Matrix winning the challenge. Denim and Kiki Coe receive negative critiques, and are announced as the bottom two. They lip-sync to "Seven Day Fool" by Jully Black. Denim wins the lip-sync and Kiki Coe sashays away.: Guest Judge: Luann de Lesseps; Mini-Challenge: Get into quick drag and host a parody late night call-in show called "Just A Tip"; Mini-Challenge Winner: Venus; Mini-Challenge Prize: A $2,000 cash tip and $500 worth of products courtesy of Trojan; Main Challenge: From Drags to Riches: The Rusical; Runway Theme: Always a Bridesmaid; Challenge Winner: Aurora Matrix; Challenge Prize: A trip to Curaçao; Bottom Two: Denim and Kiki Coe; Lip-Sync Song: "Seven Day Fool" by Jully Black; Eliminated: Kiki Coe; Farewell Message: "Ladies, this is only the beginning. Enjoy every bit of it. Love you all Kiki MF Koe 💋"
| 37 | 8 | "A Star Is Born" | January 4, 2024 |
A partner, family member, or friend of each of the five remaining contestants are brought into the workroom. For this week's mini-challenge, the queens must get into quick drag with makeup applied by their loved one and model for a photoshoot. Melinda and her partner Scott win the mini-challenge. For the main challenge, the queens give their loved one a drag makeover. On the runway, category is A Star Is Born. Denim and Venus receive positive critiques, with Denim winning the challenge. Aurora Matrix, Melinda Verga, and Nearah Nuff receive negative critiques, with Aurora Matrix declared safe. Melinda Verga and Nearah Nuff lip-sync to "I Didn't Just Come Here to Dance" by Carly Rae Jepsen. Nearah Nuff wins the lip-sync and Melinda Verga sashays away.: Guest Judge: Sarain Fox; Mini-Challenge: Model in a photoshoot wearing makeup applied by your loved one; Mini-Challenge Winners: Melinda Verga and her partner Scott; Mini-Challenge Prize: A $2,500 cash tip courtesy of O'Grady's pub; Main Challenge: Give a drag makeover to a loved one; Runway Theme: A Star Is Born; Challenge Winner: Denim; Challenge Prize: A $5,000 cash tip and a $5,000 donation to PFLAG Canada courtesy of Neutrogena; Bottom Two: Melinda Verga and Nearah Nuff; Lip-Sync Song: "I Didn't Just Come Here to Dance" by Carly Rae Jepsen; Eliminated: Melinda Verga; Farewell Message: "Even a small droplet creates ripples. Don't be afraid to make waves. ❤️MV"
| 38 | 9 | "Grand Finale" | January 11, 2024 |
For the final challenge of the season, the queens write, record, and perform their own debut single: Aurora Matrix – Asian Sensation; Denim – The Trantasy; Nearah Nuff – Stampede Drag Queen; Venus – K.U.N.T. Manifesto; The contestants also do a photoshoot with Season 3's winner Gisèle Lullaby. The queens walk the runway one last time in their Coronation Eleganza and the eliminated queens return and walk the runway one last time as well. After the runway, it is announced that Denim and Nearah Nuff are eliminated, leaving Aurora Matrix and Venus as the final two. They lip-sync to "Try" by Nelly Furtado. It is announced that Venus is the winner, leaving Aurora Matrix as the runner-up.: Guest Judge: Nelly Furtado; Main Challenge: Write and record, and perform your own debut single and do a photoshoot with Gisèle Lullaby; Runway Theme: Coronation Eleganza; Miss Congeniality: Kitten Kaboodle; Eliminated: Denim and Nearah Nuff; Top Two: Aurora Matrix and Venus; Lip Sync Song: "Try" by Nelly Furtado; Runner-up: Aurora Matrix; Winner of Canada's Drag Race Season Four: Venus
