= Sisi Superstar =

Canadian drag performer

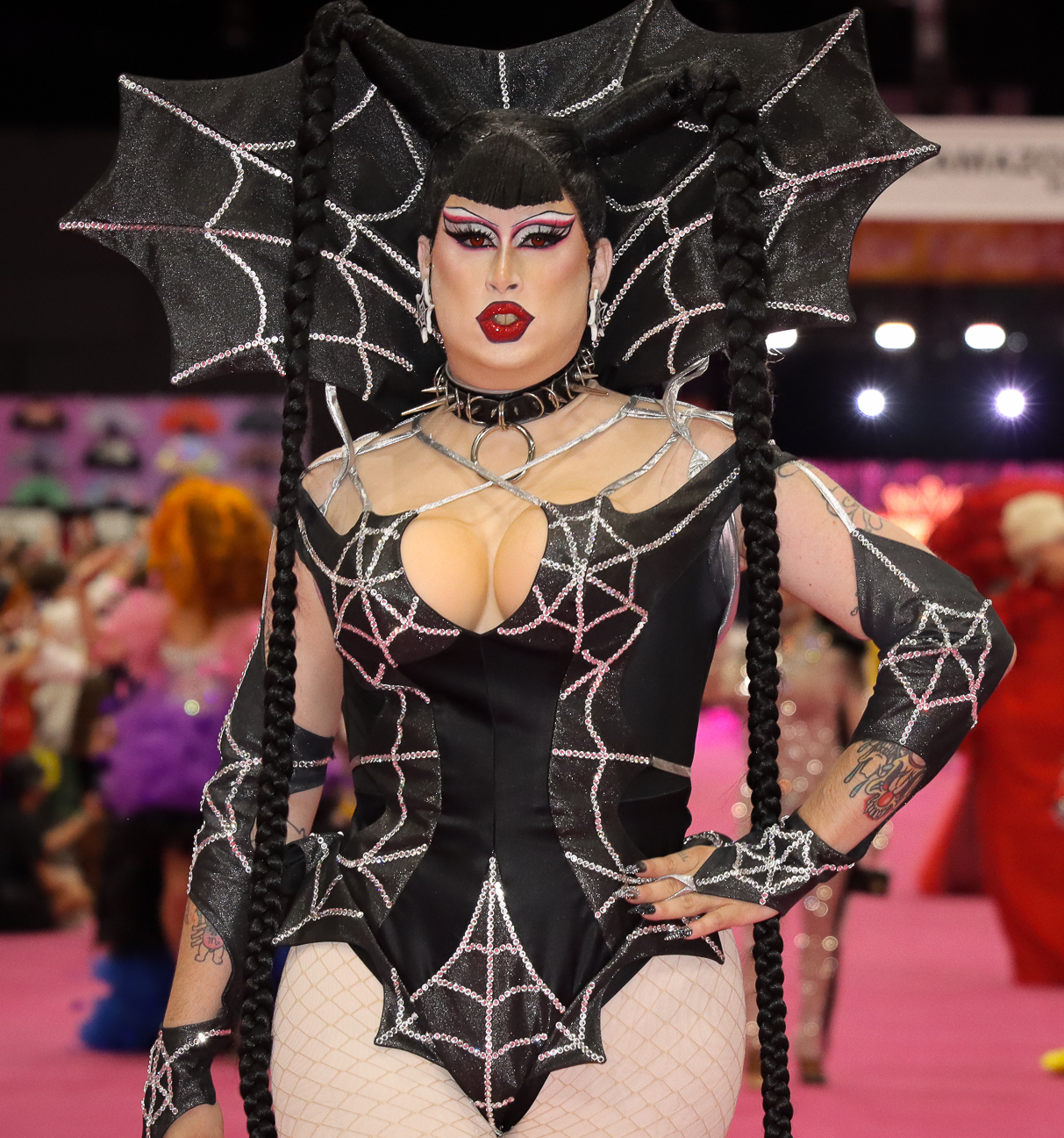
- Sisi Superstar at RuPaul's DragCon LA, 2024
- Born: Simon Fortin
- Occupation: Drag queen
- Television: Canada's Drag Race (season 4)

Sisi Superstar is the stage name of Simon Fortin, a Canadian drag performer, disc jockey, and event organizer who competed on season 4 of Canada's Drag Race.

== Early life ==
Simon Fortin was raised in the suburbs of Montreal, Quebec and was inspired by the Club Kid movement as a teenager. Fortin dressed extravagantly in high school, which slowly led to the creation of her drag persona. She began performing in 2015-16 after attending a Dita Von Teese show in drag, and began throwing her own art shows after being rejected from art school.

== Career ==
As Sisi Superstar, Fortin was crowned Miss Spooky 2021 in Montreal. In 2023, Sisi Superstar competed on season 4 of Canada's Drag Race. She appeared in two episodes, and was the first contestant to be eliminated. She has described her drag persona to be the "goth bimbo back-alley Barbie of Montreal City". Rachel Shatto of Pride.com wrote, "She made moments, pulled focus, and served punk, alternative looks that made her stand out from a truly talented crowd."

Sisi Superstar produced her first EP, Demon Tales, with Pierre Crube of electropop duo Numéro#. She has additionally released seven other music singles as of 2023. Superstar has described Demon Tales to have bits of inspiration from 2000s rock, alternative rock, electronic, new-wave, and goth music artists such as Linkin Park, Avril Lavigne, Sum 41, Billy Talent, and Crystal Castles. She describes her own music genre to be emo pop.

Outside of drag, Fortin is a community organizer, a disc jockey, a graphic designer, a professional event planner, and a songwriter. As an event planner, she co-founded the Montreal queer party series Unikorn Parties with DJ and producer Awwful.

== Personal life ==
Fortin is from Montreal, and uses the pronouns she/her in drag and he/they out of drag.

== Filmography ==
- Canada's Drag Race (season 4)
- Bring Back My Girls (2024)

== Discography ==
=== EPs ===
- Demon Tales (2021)

=== Singles ===
- Icy Tears (2021)
- Purest Evil (2021)
- Peach Dream (2021)
- Strawberry Love (2022)
- Blue Crush (2023)
- I'm a Freak (2023)
- Daddle Doo! Bitch! (2023)
