= Shelagh O'Brien =

Canadian television director

Shelagh O'Brien is a Canadian television director. She is most noted as a 10-time Canadian Screen Award winner, receiving awards for Best Direction, Variety or Sketch Comedy at the 4th Canadian Screen Awards in 2016 for the opening ceremony of the 2015 Pan American Games, for Best Direction, Lifestyle or Information at the 8th Canadian Screen Awards in 2020 for her direction of the 2019 Giller Prize gala broadcast, and Best Direction, Reality/Competition at the 9th Canadian Screen Awards for the Canada's Drag Race episode "U Wear It Well".

She is also a frequent director of Crave's television comedy specials from the Just for Laughs festival.

== Awards ==
Year	Association	Award	Work	Result	Ref.
2014	Canadian Screen Awards	Best Direction, Variety or Sketch Comedy Program or Series	Just for Laughs: All Access, "The Muppets All-Star Comedy Gala"	Nominated	
2015	Canadian Screen Awards	Best Direction, Variety or Sketch Comedy Program or Series	Just for Laughs Presents: "Whitney Cummings's Bleep Show"	Nominated	
2016	Canadian Screen Awards	Best Direction, Variety or Sketch Comedy Program or Series	2015 Pan American Games Opening Ceremony	Won	
2017	Canadian Screen Awards	Best Direction, Variety or Sketch Comedy Program or Series	The Beaverton, "Episode 3" (shared with Henry Sarwer-Foner)	Nominated	
2017	Canadian Screen Awards	Best Direction, Dramatic Program or Mini-series	Hamlet	Nominated	
2018	Canadian Screen Awards	Best Direction, Variety or Sketch Comedy Program or Series	The Beaverton, "Episode 201" (shared with Craig David Wallace)	Nominated	
2019	Canadian Screen Awards	Best Direction, Variety or Sketch Comedy Program or Series	2017 Scotiabank Giller Prize	Nominated	
2020	Canadian Screen Awards	Best Direction, Lifestyle or Information	2018 Scotiabank Giller Prize	Won	
2020	Canadian Screen Awards	Best Direction, Variety or Sketch Comedy	7th Canadian Screen Awards	Nominated	
2020	Canadian Screen Awards	Best Direction, Variety or Sketch Comedy	Trevor Noah @ JFL, Volume II	Nominated	
2021	Canadian Screen Awards	Best Direction, Variety or Sketch Comedy	Jonathan Van Ness: Kicks	Nominated	
2021	Canadian Screen Awards	Best Direction, Reality or Competition Program or Series	Canada's Drag Race, "U Wear It Well"	Won	
2022	Canadian Screen Awards	Best Direction, Reality or Competition Program or Series	Canada's Drag Race, "Under the Big Top"	Won	
2022	Canadian Screen Awards	Best Direction, Variety or Sketch Comedy Program or Series	Roast Battle Canada, "Episode 1"	Nominated	
2023	Canadian Screen Awards	Best Direction, Variety or Sketch Comedy Program or Series	Roast Battle Canada, "Episode 201"	Nominated	
2023	Canadian Screen Awards	Best Direction, Variety or Sketch Comedy Program or Series	Comedy Night with Rick Mercer, "Episode 105"	Nominated	
2023	Canadian Screen Awards	Best Direction, Reality or Competition Program or Series	Canada's Drag Race, "Squirrels Trip: The Rusical"	Won	
2024	Canadian Screen Awards	Best Direction, Reality or Competition Program or Series	Canada's Drag Race: Canada vs. the World, "Bonjour Hi"	Won	
2024	Canadian Screen Awards	Best Direction, Variety or Sketch Comedy Program or Series	Roast Battle Canada	Nominated	
2024	Canadian Screen Awards	Best Direction, Variety or Sketch Comedy Program or Series	Hannah Gadsby: Dry	Nominated	
2025	Canadian Screen Awards	Best Direction, Variety or Sketch Comedy Program or Series	Mae Martin: The Gala	Nominated	
2025	Canadian Screen Awards	Best Direction, Variety or Sketch Comedy Program or Series	Roast Battle Canada, "Hisham Kelati v Mark Little, Marito Lopez v Sophie Buddle"	Nominated	
2025	Canadian Screen Awards	Best Direction, Reality or Competition Program or Series	Canada's Drag Race, "Premiere Ball"	Won	
2025	Canadian Screen Awards	Best Direction, Reality or Competition Program or Series	Canada's Drag Race: Canada vs. the World, "Snatch Game: The Rusical"	Nominated	
