= Kitten Kaboodle (drag queen) =

Canadian drag performer and costume designer

- Born: Jeffrey Christensen; December 5, 1965 (age 60)
- Television: Canada's Drag Race (season 4); The Traitors Canada (season 3)
- Website: kittenkaboodleto.com

Kitten Kaboodle is the stage name of Jeffrey Christensen (born December 5, 1965), a Canadian drag performer and costume designer who competed on season 4 of Canada's Drag Race, winning the title of Miss Congeniality, and season 3 of The Traitors Canada.

== Early life ==
Jeffrey Christensen was introduced to drag when he was a high school student and visited The Backlot, a Calgary gay bar, at age 15. The club was located in the back of another club named Myrt's, and allowed some minors onto the premises as there was no liquor on the property. It was at The Backlot that Christensen was exposed to local queens such as Mardi, Tiggy, and Summer, which inspired him to begin performing in drag. He performed at The Backlot and the Parkside Continental, another Calgary gay bar, from the ages of 15 to "about" 20, before having to give up the hobby for multiple years because of "work and life [getting] in the way."

Christensen has stated that he went through experiences with his parents not understanding him or his sexuality.

== Career ==
Christensen moved to Toronto in 2000, and was inspired to pick back up his drag career by local queen and performer Miss Conception. He learned how to sew in 2012 for a Halloween costume contest at Woody's, a Toronto gay bar, which led to the creation of his modern drag persona. She competed as Kitten Kaboodle on season 4 of Canada's Drag Race. Kitten Kaboodle was 57 years old at the time of filming, making her the oldest contestant to compete in any Drag Race franchise. Her drag name is a pun on the phrase "kit and caboodle", meaning all of something. She won one challenge, during the second episode, and she and Aimee Yonce Shennel were eliminated on the sixth episode, which featured the first-ever "Slay-Off" lip sync tournament.

Outside of drag, Christensen is a designer and has created outfits for other Canada's Drag Race contestants.

In 2026 she starred in the Bell Fibe TV1 short-form comedy series Geri Atrick 4 Mayor, about a drag queen running for mayor of her hometown. Filmed in North Bay, the series was loosely based on the real-life campaign of LGBTQ activist Jason Maclennan for mayor of North Bay in the 2022 Nipissing District municipal elections, in which he made several campaign appearances in drag as Geri Atrick.

== Personal life ==
Christensen is based in Toronto, and uses the pronouns he/him out of drag and she/her in drag. His partner, Jim Cooke, collaborates on artistic elements such as Kitten Kaboodle's costumes and music.

== Filmography ==
- Canada's Drag Race (season 4)
- Bring Back My Girls (2024)
- Geri Atrick 4 Mayor (2026)

== See also ==
- List of people from Toronto
