= Hollywood Jade =

Canadian dancer and choreographer (born 1984)

- Born: Jade Anderson; January 4, 1984 (age 42)
- Occupations: Drag queen; television personality
- Years active: 2006–present
- Known for: Canada's Drag Race; The Traitors Canada

Jade Anderson (born January 4, 1984), known professionally as Hollywood Jade, is a Canadian dancer and choreographer best known for his regular appearances on the reality television series Canada's Drag Race.

== Career ==
Hollywood Jade began his career as a choreographer for drag queen Michelle Ross, and as a dancer in films such as Save the Last Dance 2, Camp Rock 2: The Final Jam, Turn the Beat Around, Make Your Move and Hairspray. After facing some barriers in his career due to his queer sexual identity and willingness to blur the sometimes-rigid lines of gender presentation in dance, he launched his own dance company in 2011, with his first self-produced show being one which blended hip hop dance with burlesque dance.

He has also done music video work for artists including Snoop Dogg, Keshia Chanté, Meghan Trainor, Estelle, Lil Wayne, Brooke Lynn Hytes and Priyanka, and has been the permanent artistic director and choreographer for Jully Black.

In 2021, he performed on FreeUp! The Emancipation Day Special.

Hollywood Jade choreographed the world-premiere of Sable Sweetgrass' Awoowaakii at Theatre Calgary, which premiered April 2025.

== Filmography ==
Year	Title	Genre	Role	Notes	Ref
2020–present	Canada's Drag Race	TV	Main judge	Season 6–present	
2020–present	Canada's Drag Race	TV	Himself	Choreographer (season 1–4, 7 episodes); Guest judge (season 2–3, 2 episodes); Special guest (season 5, 1 episode)	
2022–2024	Canada's Drag Race: Canada vs. the World	TV	Himself	Guest judge (season 1, 1 episode); Choreographer (season 2, 1 episode)	
2024	Mark McKinney Needs a Hobby	TV	Himself	Guest (1 episode)	
2025	The Traitors Canada	TV	Contestant	Co-Winner; season 3 (10 episodes)	
