= Mardi Pieronek =

Canadian TikToker and podcaster

- Born: 1962 (age 63–64); Calgary, Canada
- Occupations: social media personality podcaster

TikTok information
- Page: mardipantz
- Followers: 326.3K
- Last updated: 14 September 2025

Marilyn "Mardi" Pieronek (born 1962) is a Canadian TikToker, podcaster, former drag artist, and former sex worker. She is known on TikTok by the username Mardipantz, where she makes content about being a transgender woman in the 1970s and 1980s punk scene and club scenes in Vancouver. Pieronek is a co-host of the podcast A Life Lived Trans.

== Biography ==
Pieronek was born in Calgary, Alberta in 1962. She ran away from home when she was fifteen years old, in 1977, and came out as a transgender woman and began her gender transition. She was active in the Vancouver club scene in the 1980s, performing at the LUV-A-FAIR punk rock club. She was also a drag performer and sex worker, living and working in Davie Village as a prostitute to fund her gender affirming healthcare.

She is a TikTok content creator, posting about her experiences as a transgender woman who lived in the 1970s and 1980s. Pieronek is a co-host of the podcast A Life Lived Trans.

Pieronek lives on Vancouver Island in British Columbia with her husband. She had a drug addiction and is now sober.
