= Venus (drag queen) =

Canadian drag performer

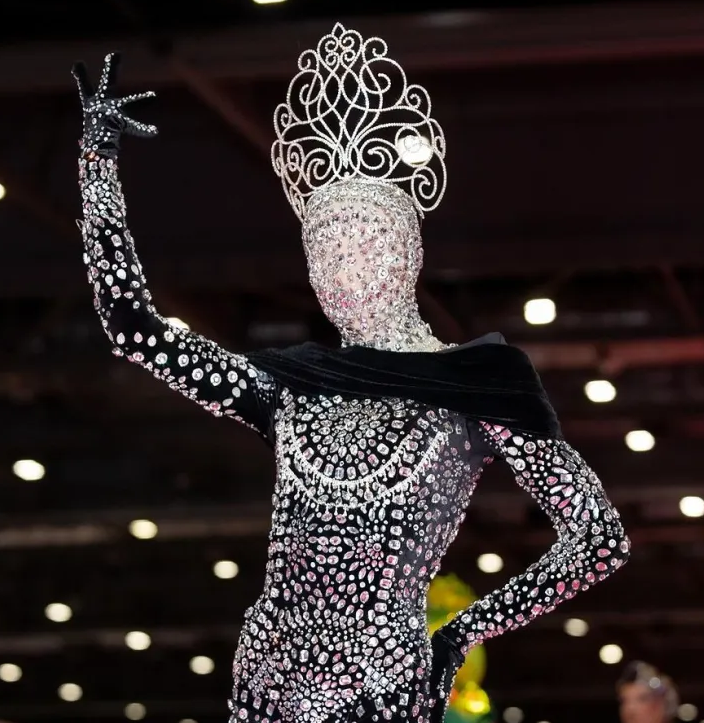
- Venus at RuPaul's DragCon UK, 2024
- Other names: Venus Kunt; Venus Sherwood
- Citizenship: Canadian
- Occupation: Drag queen
- Television: Canada's Drag Race (season 4)
- Website: legallyvenus.com

Venus (also known as Venus Kunt) is the stage name of Venus Sherwood, a Canadian drag performer and the winner of season 4 of Canada's Drag Race.

== Career ==
Venus is a drag performer and entertainer. She is a member of the non-binary drag group ENBY6, as well as the Gender Drag family with her "drag mother" Kendall Gender, who competed on the second season of Canada's Drag Race. In 2017, Venus co-hosted the Sin City Military Fetish Ball in Vancouver. She was a guest on Tommy Genesis' God Is Wild Tour in 2019. In 2023, she hosted and performed with ENBY6 at the Happyland Festival in conjunction with Pride.

Venus is the winner of the fourth season of Canada's Drag Race. She started watching Drag Race in 2017, when she worked at a hair salon with Season 2 contestant Beth. She won the premiere challenge of the season, placed in the top for five others, including the Snatch Game and Rusical challenges, and never placed in the bottom. At the finale, she was ultimately crowned the winner over runner-up Aurora Matrix. She is the fourth winner of the Drag Race franchise of Indigenous descent, following Trixie Mattel, Yvie Oddly, and Sasha Colby, also making her the first non-American indigenous winner.

== Personal life ==
Based in Vancouver, Venus is a Red River Métis two-spirit person. Venus uses the pronouns she/her in drag, and has no preferred gender pronouns out of drag. She changed her legal first name to Venus in September 2020.

== Filmography ==
=== Television ===
- Canada's Drag Race (season 4) (Winner)

== See also ==
- List of Métis people
- List of people from Vancouver

Preceded by Gisèle Lullaby	Winner of Canada's Drag Race; Canada season 4	Succeeded by The Virgo Queen
