= Aurora Matrix =

Canadian drag performer

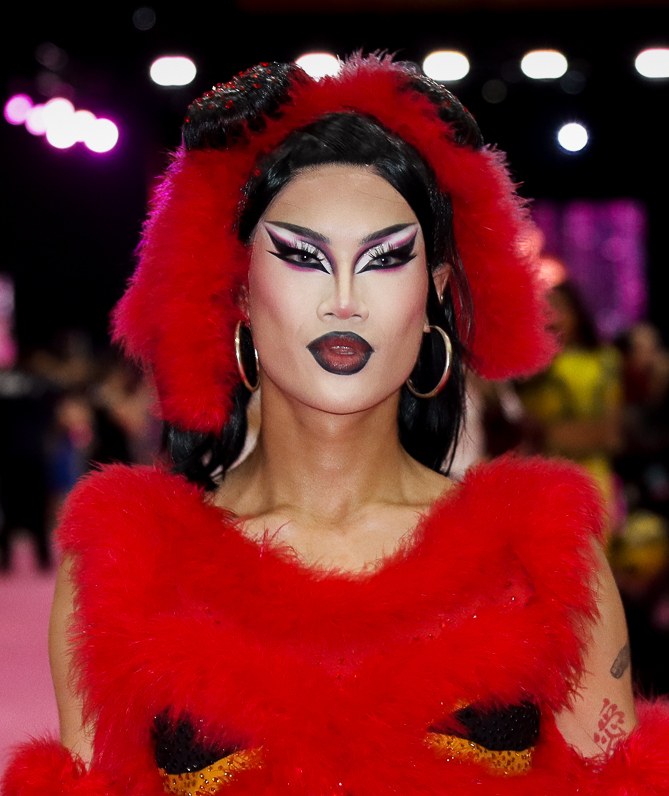
- Aurora Matrix at RuPaul's DragCon LA 2024
- Born: Anton Ling; April 14, 2000 (age 26)
- Education: York University (BFA)
- Occupation: Drag queen
- Television: 1 Queen 5 Queers; Canada's Drag Race (season 4)
- Website: auroramatrix.com

Aurora Matrix is the stage name of Anton Ling (born April 14, 2000), a Canadian drag performer best known for winning the first season of Canada's Drag Race All Stars. She previously competed on the fourth season of Canada's Drag Race.

== Education ==
Aurora Matrix earned a bachelor's degree in fine arts from York University.

== Career ==
Aurora Matrix is a drag artist who performs in Toronto regularly. In 2021, during the COVID-19 pandemic, she performed in a series of drive-in drag shows called Drive 'N Queens. She also performed in Sarnia's inaugural PrideFest in 2022. Aurora Matrix appeared on Crave's series 1 Queen 5 Queers, and competed in the fourth season of Canada's Drag Race. She won two challenges, including the Rusical challenge, and placed in the bottom for the Snatch Game challenge, defeating and sending home Luna DuBois in a lip sync for your life. She ultimately placed as the season's runner-up to Venus. She returned to Drag Race for Canada's Drag Race All Stars where she won three challenges and was crowned "Canada's Ultimate All Star".

With fellow Canada's Drag Race alumni Perla and Van Goth, Aurora is a co-host of The Powder Room, a podcast on Drag Race and other pop culture topics. The trio won the People's Choice Award at the 2025 Canadian Podcast Awards.

== Personal life ==
Aurora Matrix uses the pronouns she/they in drag and they/them out of drag. They are non-binary and queer, and from an immigrant family with their parents emigrating from China to Canada. They have been in a relationship with actor Matthew Finlan since 2024.

== Filmography ==
- 1 Queen 5 Queers
- Canada's Drag Race (season 4)
- Tongue Thai'd (2024)
- Bring Back My Girls (2024)
