= Nearah Nuff =

Canadian drag performer

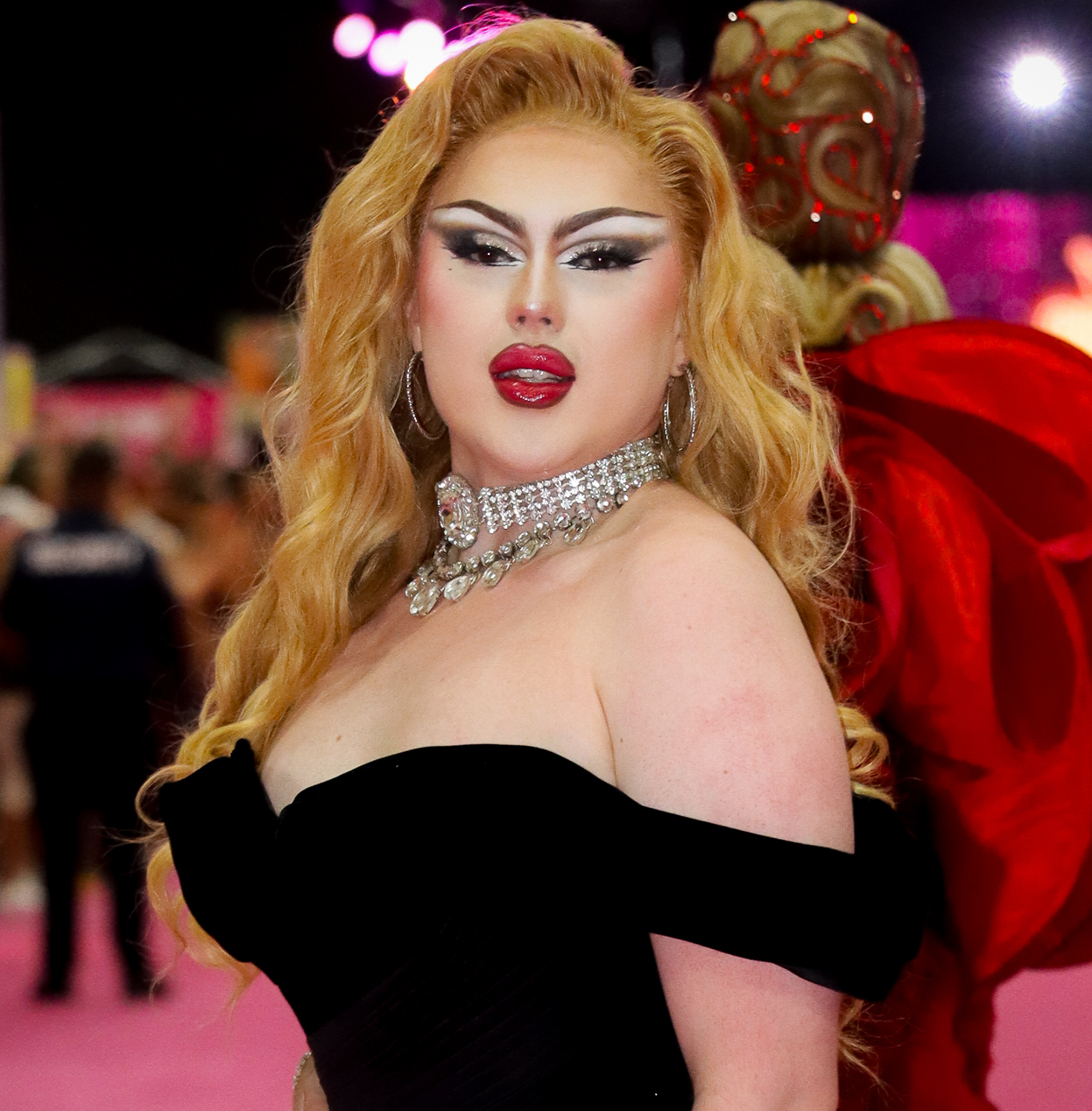
- Nearah Nuff at RuPaul's DragCon LA, 2024
- Born: Dallyn Gray-Forrest
- Television: Canada's Drag Race (season 4)

Nearah Nuff is the stage name of Dallyn Gray-Forrest, a Canadian drag performer who competed on season 4 of Canada's Drag Race and season 1 of Canada's Drag Race All Stars.

== Career ==
Nearah Nuff competed on season 4 of Canada's Drag Race. She placed in the top four.

== Personal life ==
Nearah Nuff was raised in Lloydminster, and is based in Calgary. Her former fiancé Jakob Schiffner appeared on an episode of Canada's Drag Race. Nearah Nuff uses the pronouns she/her in drag and he/him out of drag.

== Filmography ==
- Canada's Drag Race (season 4)
- Bring Back My Girls (2024)
