= Denim (drag queen) =

Canadian drag entertainer

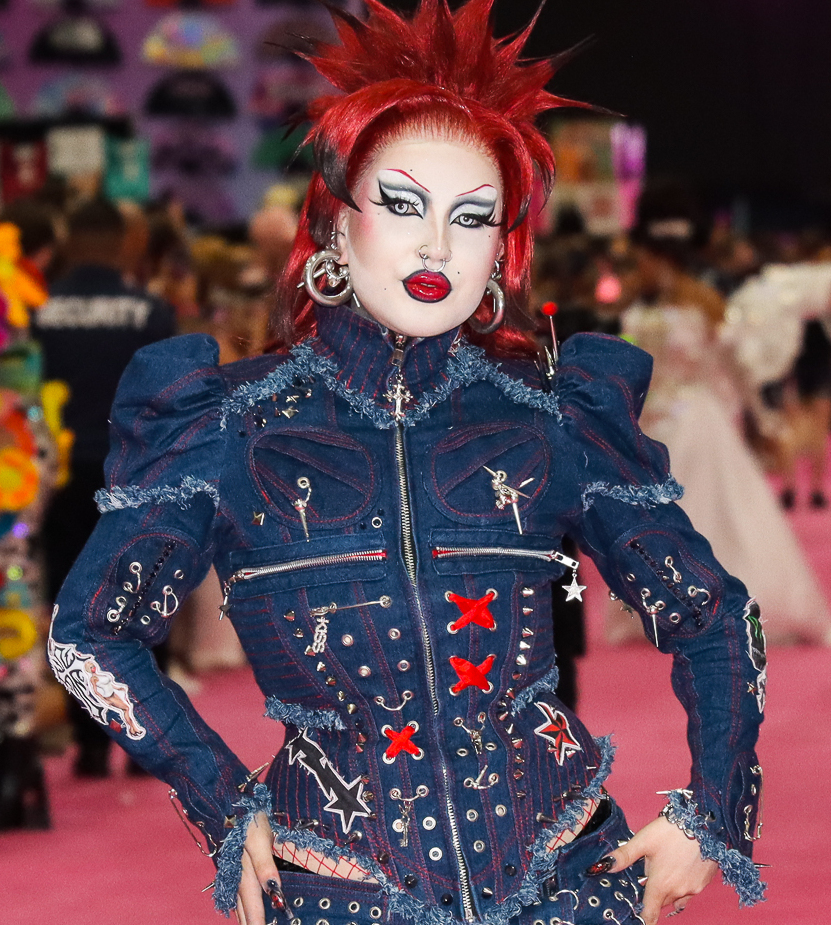
- Denim at RuPaul's DragCon LA, 2024
- Born: October 5, 1998 (age 28); Charlottetown, Prince Edward Island
- Other names: Emerson Sanderson; Denim Pussy
- Occupation: Drag queen
- Television: Canada's Drag Race (season 4)
- Website: denimjustdenim.com

Denim, formerly known as Denim Pussy, is the stage name of Emerson Sanderson, a Canadian drag performer who competed on season 4 of Canada's Drag Race.

== Career ==
Sanderson is a drag performer. His drag persona Denim has been described as a "transmasculine drag queen known for her effortless blend of 2000s bimbo fashion and futuristic club kid aesthetic". Denim has performed with Caroline Polachek, Charli XCX, Kim Petras, King Princess, and Tinashe. Denim was named Mx. Queerdo. Denim competed on the fourth season of Canada's Drag Race. Denim placed in the bottom two of the Rusical challenge and defeated Kiki Coe in a lip-sync. Denim was equal third in the competition overall.

In December 2024, Denim and Drag Race colleague Pythia premiered Oraculum, a theatre show blending drag, puppetry and projection work, at Buddies in Bad Times in Toronto.

== Personal life ==
Sanderson is originally from Charlottetown, and is now based in Montreal. He is autistic. He is the second trans man to compete within the Drag Race franchise, following Gottmik. Denim uses the pronouns she/her in drag and he/him out of drag.

== Filmography ==
- Canada's Drag Race
- Bring Back My Girls (2024)
