= Canada's Drag Race =

Canadian reality competition television series (since 2020)

- Also known as: Drag Race Canada
- Genre: Reality competition
- Created by: RuPaul
- Based on: RuPaul's Drag Race
- Directed by: Shelagh O'Brien
- Judges: Brooke Lynn Hytes; Jeffrey Bowyer-Chapman; Stacey McKenzie; Amanda Brugel; Brad Goreski; Traci Melchor; Sarain Fox; Hollywood Jade; Carson Kressley
- Theme music composer: RuPaul
- Opening theme: "RuPaul's Drag Race" theme
- Ending theme: "U Wear It Well"
- Country of origin: Canada
- Original language: English
- No. of seasons: 6
- No. of episodes: 56 (list of episodes)

Production
- Executive producers: Fenton Bailey; Randy Barbato; Mike Bickerton; Tom Campbell; Michael Kot; Laura Michalchyshyn; Betty Orr; Pam McNair; RuPaul Charles; Randy Lennox; Tracey Pearce
- Running time: 60 min.
- Production company: Blue Ant Studios

Original release
- Network: Crave
- Release: July 2, 2020 – present

Related
- Drag Race franchise; Canada's Drag Race: Canada vs. the World; Canada's Drag Race All Stars

Canada's Drag Race is a Canadian reality competition television series based on the American series RuPaul's Drag Race and is the Canadian edition of the Drag Race franchise, produced by Blue Ant Studios. In a similar format to the American version, the show features a crop of Canadian drag queens as they compete for a grand prize of $100,000 and the title of "Canada's Next Drag Superstar". The series airs on Crave in Canada, the United Kingdom's BBC Three (formerly), and worldwide on WOW Presents Plus.

It was the fourth international version of the Drag Race franchise to be announced, following Drag Race Thailand, The Switch Drag Race (Chile) and RuPaul's Drag Race UK. Canada's Drag Race was the first English-language iteration of Drag Race not to be hosted by RuPaul, although RuPaul does appear in video messages to the contestants and narrates the title sequence. The series is hosted by RuPaul's Drag Race season 11 runner-up Brooke Lynn Hytes, along with judges Sarain Fox, Hollywood Jade, Carson Kressley and Traci Melchor. Past judges include Amanda Brugel, Jeffrey Bowyer-Chapman, Brad Goreski and Stacey McKenzie.

The first episode of the first season premiered on July 2, 2020. The cast was announced on May 14, 2020. A third season was announced on November 10, 2021 and premiered on July 14, 2022. The series has been critically acclaimed and has won 18 Canadian Screen Awards.

== Production ==
=== Season 1 ===
Casting occurred in mid-2019 with production starting in fall 2019. The inaugural season consisted of ten one-hour episodes. In June 2020 it was announced that the series would be carried by BBC Three in the United Kingdom. Early coverage of the production announcement indicated that the series would also air on OutTV; although that channel did not simulcast the series in first run, it was later announced on December 3 that there would be a marathon of the series on December 5, along with all episodes being available for streaming as of December 3, on OutTV's subscription service, OutTV Go.

In the United States the series premiered on WOW Presents Plus, the streaming service of RuPaul's Drag Race production company World of Wonder, concurrently with its Canadian debut. It was subsequently added to the schedule of Logo TV, premiering on that service on July 27, 2020.

In August 2021, it was announced that the Season 1 queens would be featured in a Canada's Drag Race Anniversary Extravaganza reunion special, airing on Crave September 6, 2021 in advance of the second season launch. The special included the premiere of a new music video from Priyanka's Taste Test EP, as well as an introduction to the second season judging panel.

=== Season 2 ===
In January 2021, it was announced that the show was renewed for a second season. At the same time, it was announced that comedian and producer Trevor Boris would join production as showrunner in the second season.

In March 2021, it was announced that Bowyer-Chapman would not be returning as a judge in the second season, due to a scheduling conflict with another project he is working on. In June 2021, it was announced that McKenzie would not return as a judge in the second season, due to travel restrictions related to the COVID-19 pandemic. The second season judging panel included fashion stylist Brad Goreski, actress Amanda Brugel, and broadcaster and Season 1 "Squirrel Friend" Traci Melchor.

=== Season 3 ===
For the third season, the judges panel was re-worked again, consisting of only Brooke Lynn Hytes, Goreski, and Melchor.

=== Season 4 ===
A fourth season was announced in November 2022, with casting opened November 1 and closed November 22, with Brooke Lynn Hytes, Goreski, and Melchor expected to return to the judging panel. The cast was officially announced on October 18, 2023 and the season premiered on November 16, 2023.

=== Season 5 ===
A fifth season was announced on November 9, 2023, with casting running throughout November. It was open to any Canadian citizens or permanent residents who were 19 on November 1, 2023. The cast was announced on October 23, 2024, and the season premiered on November 21, 2024.

=== Season 6 ===
A sixth season was announced on October 31, 2024, and the casting opened on the same day. Filming and casting concluded on November 18 of the same year, and the season premiered on November 20, 2025.

=== Season 7 ===
A seventh season was announced on November 6, 2025, and casting opened on the same day. The season is currently in development.

== Judges ==
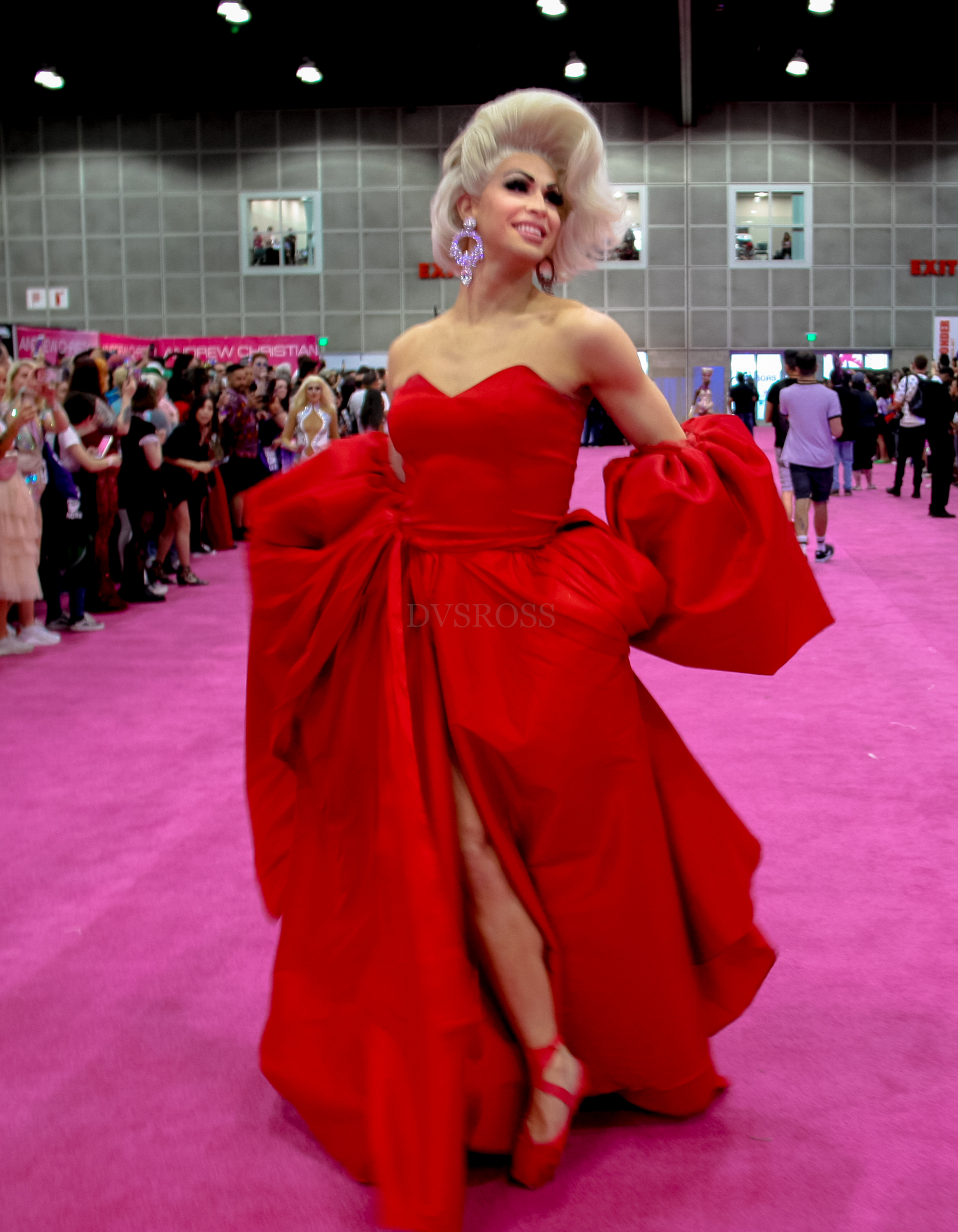
Brooke Lynn Hytes

On September 26, 2019, it was announced that the judging panel for the first season would include RuPaul's Drag Race season 11 runner-up Brooke Lynn Hytes, actor Jeffrey Bowyer-Chapman and fashion model Stacey McKenzie. Bell Media personality Traci Melchor appears as a recurring cast member, with the title "Canada's Squirrel Friend"; her role in the first season entailed participatory support in challenges, including co-judging the Canada Gay-M mini-challenge, hosting a sheTalk red carpet segment prior to Snatch Game, and serving as one of the judges of the Miss Loose Jaw pageant. Melchor also guest hosted the season finale. Brooke Lynn Hytes was the first prior competitor in the RuPaul's Drag Race franchise to appear on the judge's panel on any edition of the show.

In March 2021 Brooke Lynn Hytes and McKenzie announced they would be returning for the show's second season while Bowyer-Chapman would not, citing scheduling issues, writing that "unfortunately, with scheduling, things just didn't work out for him to come back this season... he'll be so missed". On June 28, 2021, a tweet from the show's official Twitter account confirmed that, contrary to the previous announcement, McKenzie would not be returning either, blaming "COVID-related challenges" that meant she was unable to travel to Canada to film the season. The following day on June 29, 2021, celebrity stylist Brad Goreski and actress and season one guest host Amanda Brugel were announced to be joining the panel to replace Bowyer-Chapman and McKenzie, with "Canada's Squirrel Friend" Melchor also becoming a judge and alternating weekly with Brugel. Brooke Lynn Hytes, Goreski and Melchor returned as judges for the third, fourth and fifth seasons.

The sixth season saw the first major change to the panel since Brugel's departure. Goreski left the panel, revealing prior to the season's premiere that he had been asked to return but declined "for different reasons". Fans speculated that his involvement as a stylist with Demi Moore's awards season appearances for The Substance (2024) may have precluded his return. Brooke Lynn Hytes and Melchor were instead joined by three rotating "special resident guest judges": Carson Kressley, also a rotating judge on American iterations of the show; Hollywood Jade, the show's resident choreographer; and Sarain Fox, who had been a recurring guest judge on the previous three seasons.

Former and recurring judges on Canada's Drag Race
Judge	Season						
Judge	1	2	3	4	5	6	7
Brooke Lynn Hytes	Main	Main	Main	Main	Main	Main	Main
Jeffrey Bowyer-Chapman	Main						
Stacey McKenzie	Main						
Traci Melchor	Recurring	Main	Main	Main	Main	Main	Main
Amanda Brugel	Guest	Main					
Brad Goreski		Main	Main	Main	Main		
Sarain Fox			Recurring	Guest	Recurring	Main	Main
Hollywood Jade	Guest	Guest	Guest	Guest	Guest	Main	Main
Carson Kressley						Main	Main

== Series overview ==
Season	Contestants	Episodes	Originally released		Winner	Runner(s)-up	Miss Congeniality
Season	Contestants	Episodes	First released	Last released	Winner	Runner(s)-up	Miss Congeniality
1	12	10	July 2, 2020	September 3, 2020	Priyanka	Rita Baga; Scarlett BoBo	—N/a
2	12	10	October 14, 2021	December 16, 2021	Icesis Couture	Kendall Gender; Pythia	Suki Doll
3	12	9	July 14, 2022	September 8, 2022	Gisèle Lullaby	Jada Shada Hudson	Vivian Vanderpuss
4	11	9	November 16, 2023	January 11, 2024	Venus	Aurora Matrix	Kitten Kaboodle
5	11	9	November 21, 2024	January 16, 2025	The Virgo Queen	Makayla Couture	Jaylene Tyme
6	12	9	November 20, 2025	January 15, 2026	Van Goth	Eboni La'Belle	Hazel
7	12	TBA	November 19, 2026	TBA	TBA	TBA	TBA

== Contestants ==
There have been a total of 70 contestants featured in six seasons of Canada's Drag Race so far with Priyanka, Icesis Couture, Gisèle Lullaby, Venus, The Virgo Queen, and Van Goth being crowned Canada's Next Drag Superstar. Contestants have returned to compete on other editions of the Drag Race franchise, including on RuPaul's Drag Race: UK vs. the World, RuPaul's Drag Race All Stars, and RuPaul's Drag Race Global All Stars.

== Post-production ==
=== Drag Ball and Drag Superstars ===
Separately from the production of the series, all of the queens from the season participated in Pride events for both Pride Toronto and Fierté Montreal, presented as online streaming specials due to the COVID-19 pandemic in Canada. The Toronto event, Drag Ball presented by Crave, was streamed on June 27, and the Montreal event, Drag Superstars, was streamed on August 14. The Toronto special was directly produced by Crave; the Montreal event was produced by a separate company, but received some production assistance and sponsorship from Crave and the Canada's Drag Race production team.

=== Controversies ===
During the series run, producers and competing queens spoke out against online bullying, after Bowyer-Chapman and some of the competing queens were subjected to campaigns of harassment on social media. Bowyer-Chapman's critics focused on purportedly unfair comments in his role as a judge, while several queens were attacked for simply having done better in challenges or lipsyncs than other more popular queens with bigger fanbases.

=== Canada's Drag Race Live at the Drive-In ===
Following the conclusion of the season, the cast announced a cross-Canada tour, to be performed at drive-in venues due to the ongoing social distancing restrictions remaining in place during the COVID-19 pandemic. Brooke Lynn Hytes hosted, with Priyanka, Scarlett Bobo and Rita Baga were scheduled to appear at every date on the tour, while other cast members would perform at selected dates based on availability; ultimately, however, both Priyanka and Brooke Lynn Hytes had to miss a couple of later dates after being forced to self-isolate due to COVID-19 exposure.

Priyanka, Scarlett Bobo, Rita Baga and Jimbo also participated in an online panel as part of the 2020 Just for Laughs festival.

The second season queens are also slated to undertake their own group tour in 2022.

== Spin-offs ==
=== Canada's Drag Race: Canada vs. the World ===
On June 9, 2022 Crave officially announced the spin-off series Canada's Drag Race: Canada vs. the World that would premiere in late 2022. The series follows RuPaul's Drag Race: UK vs. the World as the second "International All Stars" edition of the franchise, bringing competitors from various international editions of the franchise. Brooke Lynn Hytes, Goreski, and Melchor were also announced to be judging the series. The cast was announced on October 17, 2022 and features four queens who originally competed on the first and second seasons of Canada's Drag Race. It also included competitors who were previously featured in RuPaul's Drag Race, RuPaul's Drag Race All Stars, RuPaul's Drag Race UK, and RuPaul's Drag Race Down Under. The first season of the series premiered on November 18, 2022 and concluded on December 23, 2022. A second season was announced on June 6, 2023. The cast was announced on June 26, 2024 and included competitors from Drag Race UK, Drag Race France and American Drag Race and All Stars alongside Canadian contestants. The season premiered on July 19, 2024 and concluded on August 23, 2024.

=== Slaycation ===
Another spin-off of the series titled Slaycation was announced in September 2023 at the Content Canada conference. The series features six contestants from across the Drag Race franchise, and follows them as they vacation in a Canadian winter cabin, participate in activities, and organize a drag performance for the local community. The series is produced by World of Wonder, Crave, and Blue Ant Media and airs in English and French on Crave in Canada and WOW Presents Plus globally.

=== Canada's Drag Race All Stars ===
On 19 February 2026, it was announced that Canada's Drag Race will get its own All Stars spin-off series. It will consist of six one-hour episodes with Priyanka and Jimbo joining Brooke Lynn Hytes on the judging panel.

== Discography ==
List of singles
Title	Season
"Not Sorry Aboot It"	1
"U Wear It Well" (Cast Version; Queens of the North Ru-Mix)	1
"Under the Big Top"	2
"Bye, Flop!"	2
"Queen of the North" (Remix)	2
"Squirrels Trip: The Rusical"	3
"True North Strong and Fierce"	3
"Heartbreak"	4
"Heartbeat"	4
"Asian Sensation" (Aurora Matrix)	4
"The Trantasy" (Denim)	4
"Stampede Drag Queen" (Nearah Nuff)	4
"K.U.N.T. Manifesto" (Venus)	4
"Go Off Queen"	5
"Duh"	5
"Not"	5
"Poison" (Helena Poison)	5
"To The Sky (Limitless)" (Makayla Couture)	5
"Wangderful" (Minhi Wang)	5
"The Stars Have Aligned" (The Virgo Queen)	5
"Not Sorry About It (Lemon's Version)"	6
"Charisma Uniqueness Nerve & Talent Rap Battle"	6
"Rags to Riches" (Eboni La'Belle)	6
"Bottoms Up" (PM)	6
"Hey Sami Landri" (Sami Landri)	6
"The Villain" (Van Goth)	6

== Reception ==
In its December 2020 year in review, the Canadian film and television industry magazine Playback named Canada's Drag Race the Unscripted Series of the Year. The show was the highest-rated original production in Crave's history. It has won 25 Canadian Screen Awards including Best Reality/Competition Program or Series on three occasions and every Best Casting, Non-fiction award since its creation at the 2022 ceremony.
