= Eh-laganza Eh-xtravaganza =

- Canada's Drag Race episode
- Episode no.: Season 1 Episode 1
- Presented by: Elisha Cuthbert
- Original air date: July 2, 2020
- Running time: 59 minutes

Episode chronology
← Previous —	Next → "Her-itage Moments"
- Canada's Drag Race season 1

"Eh-laganza Eh-xtravaganza" is the first season premiere of Canadian reality competition television series Canada's Drag Race. The franchise's premiere episode, it aired on July 2, 2020 on the television network Crave.

The episode welcomes twelve new contestants and have them design a couture-themed outfit from a box of materials based on different Canadian themes. Elisha Cuthbert serves as a guest host, alongside regular panelists Brooke Lynn Hytes, Jeffrey Bowyer-Chapman, and Stacey McKenzie.

The episode won a Canadian Screen Award for Best Production Design or Art Direction in a Non-Fiction Series at the 9th Canadian Screen Awards in 2021.

== Episode ==
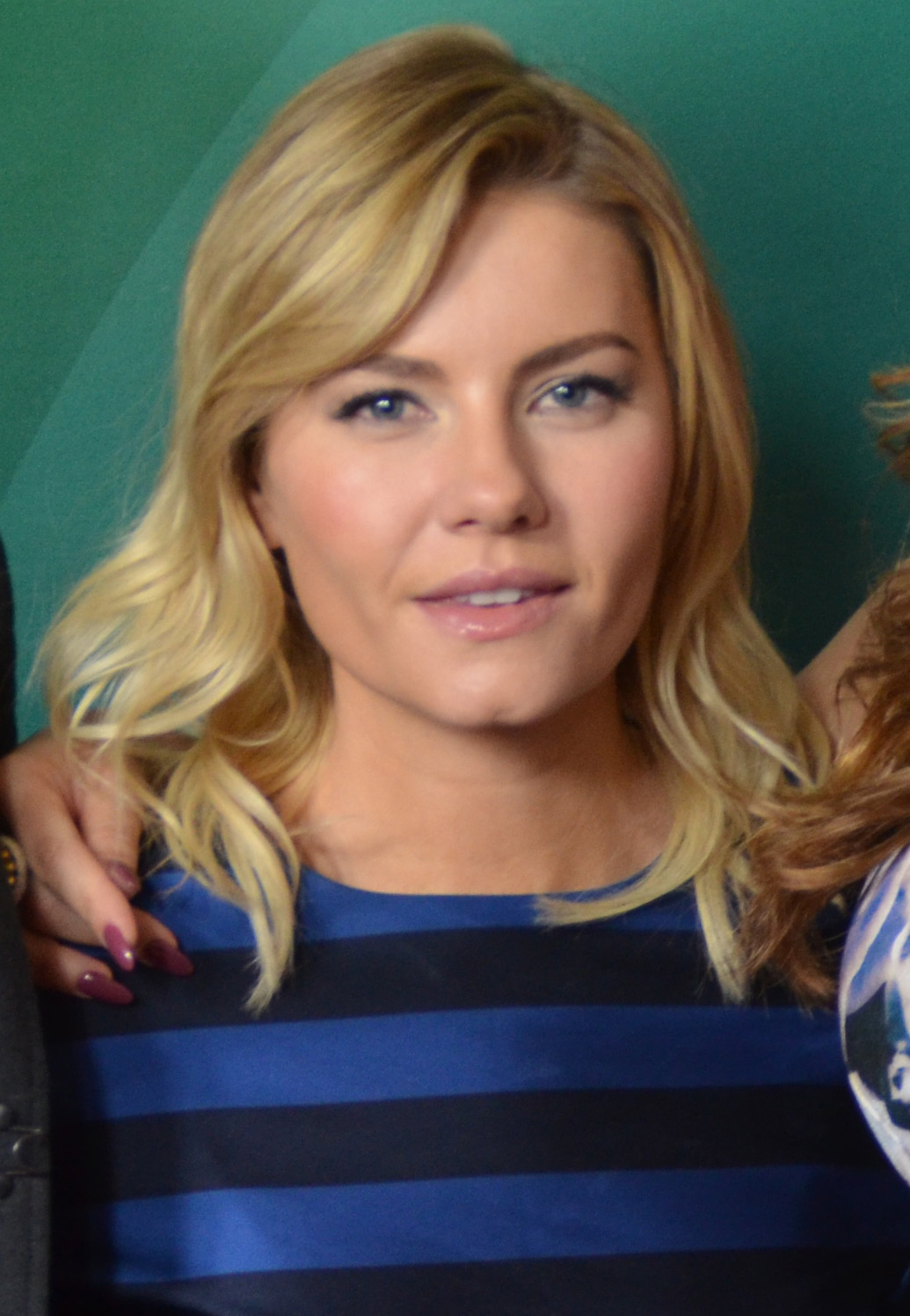
Elisha Cuthbert (pictured in 2015) is a guest judge.

The episode begins with twelve Canadian queens entering the workroom for the first time. They are Priyanka from Toronto; Ilona Verley from Vancouver; Kiara from Montreal; Juice Boxx originally from Essex, Ontario and living in Toronto; Anastarzia Anaquway from East York; Lemon originally from Toronto and currently in New York City, United States; Scarlett BoBo from Toronto; Kyne from Kitchener-Waterloo; BOA from Windsor, Ontario; Rita Baga from Montreal; Jimbo from Victoria, British Columbia; and Tynomi Banks from Toronto.

For the mini challenge the queens climb a Rocky Mountains replica and pose for a photoshoot shot by photographer Matt Barnes. Kyne wins the mini challenge, winning $1,000.00 of latex couture from Polymorphe.

In the maxi challenge the queens are assigned boxes of material based on different Canadianisms with fabrics and accessories from Roots and need to make a high fashion runway look for the main stage. By winning the mini challenge Kyne gets to pick her box and assign the others. The assigned boxes are:

- Canada Gay for Anastarzia Anaquway (based on Canada Day)
- Man of Green Gay-bles for BOA (based on Anne of Green Gables)
- Muskokurrrr for Ilona Verley (based on Muskoka, Ontario)
- Rain-Blow It Up for Jimbo
- Much Ru-sic Video Prance for Juice Boxx (based on Much Music video dances)
- Like a Prairie for Kiara (based on the Canadian Prairies)
- Yukon Gold Digger for Kyne (based on the Yukon Gold Rush)
- Jock Scraps for Lemon
- Gone Fishy for Priyanka (based on the Maritimes)
- Glampede for Scarlett BoBo (based on the Calgary Stampede)
- Quebec-Froid for Rita Baga (based on Quebec)
- Lumber Janes for Tynomi Banks

In the workroom, in a conversation with Ilona Verley they discuss being Nlaka'pamux. They are the first Indigenous contestant on Canada's Drag Race and the first two-spirit contestant to compete on Drag Race. BOA and Juice Boxx also discuss sobriety while working in drag.

On the main stage Elisha Cuthbert is the guest host and joins regular panelists Brooke Lynn Hytes, Jeffrey Bowyer-Chapman, and Stacey McKenzie. BOA, Jimbo, Juice Boxx, Kyne, Lemon, and Rita Baga are the best and worst performers of the week. Following deliberation and Untucked Rita Baga is declared the winner of the main challenge, earning her a shopping spree of $5,000 from Roots Canada.

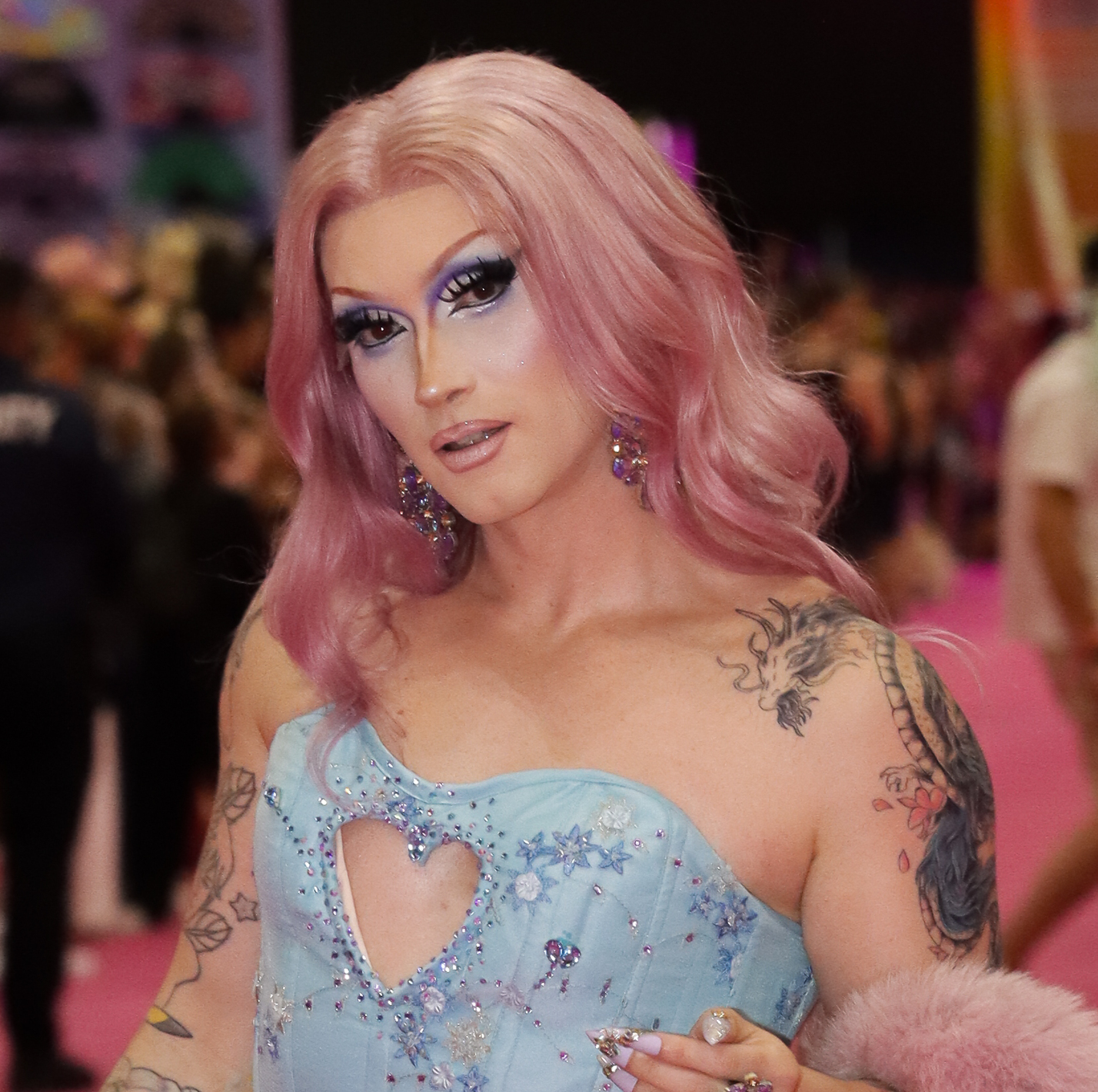
Juice Boxx is eliminated from the competition.

Juice Boxx and Lemon place in the bottom two and face off in a lip-sync contest to "I Really Like You" (2015) by Carly Rae Jepsen. Lemon wins the lip sync and Juice Boxx is eliminated from the competition and returns to the workroom to write a message on the mirror using lipstick for the remaining contestants.

== Production ==
=== Development ===
Crave, a television network, announced they greenlit a Canadian adaptation of RuPaul's Drag Race with American host RuPaul named as executive producer of the series on June 27, 2019. A press release from Blue Ant Media announced a casting call for drag performers to apply on July 9. In the same year, filming began in November at Hamilton, Ontario.

== Release ==
"Eh-laganza Eh-xtravaganza" originally aired on Crave in Canada on July 2, 2020. The next day, the episode was released on streaming service BBC Three in the United Kingdom. The episode made its debut on cable network Logo TV in the United States on July 27, 2020.

== Reception ==
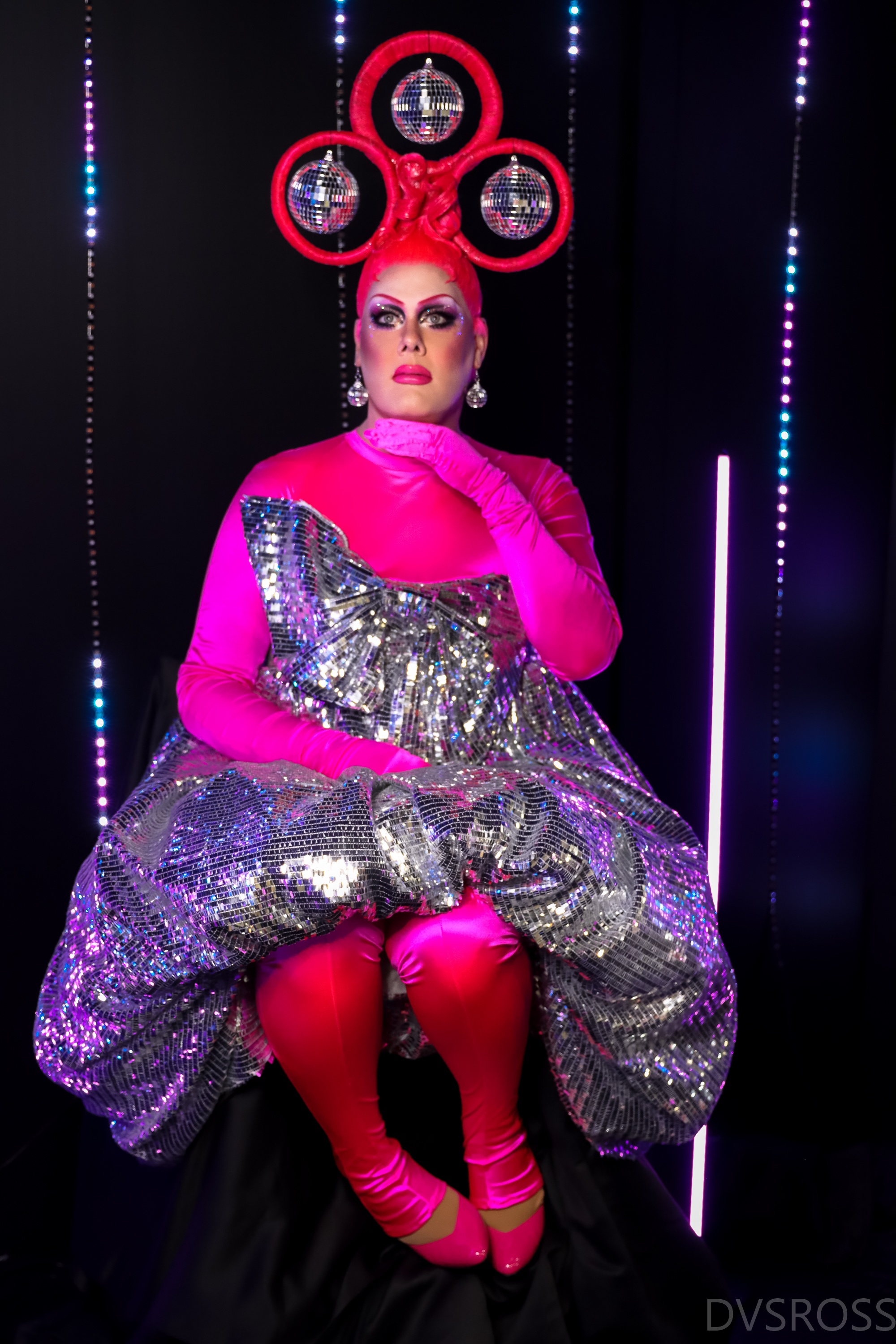
Rita Baga (pictured in 2023) wins the main challenge.

In a four-out-of-five review, Rebecca Alter of Vulture sees the franchise as a "mythical Greek hydra" and felt the premiere as an "old-school" episode from Logo TV. Alter described Kyne's characterization as RuPaul's Drag Race finalist Pearl Liaison for getting "argumentative" to their competitors and "refusing to humor" the judging panelists. After revealing the bottom two, she described the lip-sync contest as "meh".

Isabel Edwards-Brown of Cosmopolitan included two quotes from Ilona Verley and Jimbo in a list comprising the series "absolute best quotes so far". Jimbo's performance in the mini challenge also becomes a meme and GIF reaction, with Alter describing Jimbo as "[winning] the race with her scream heard ’round the internet.

Peter Faragher won a Canadian Screen Award for Best Production Design or Art Direction in a Non-Fiction Series at the 9th Canadian Screen Awards for his work on the episode.
