= U Wear It Well (Canada's Drag Race) =

- Canada's Drag Race episode
- Episode no.: Season 1 Episode 10
- Directed by: Shelagh O'Brien
- Original air date: September 3, 2020

Guest appearance
- Traci Melchor

Episode chronology
← Previous "The Snow Ball"	Next → "Lost and Fierce"
- Canada's Drag Race season 1

"U Wear It Well" is the tenth and final episode of the first season of the Canadian reality competition television series Canada's Drag Race, which aired on September 3, 2020 on the television network Crave.

In this episode the top three contestants write and record verses for a remix of RuPaul's song "U Wear It Well", and Canada's First Drag Superstar is crowned. Guest host for the episode is Traci Melchor, who acted as Canada's Squirrel Friend throughout the season. She is joined by regular panelists Brooke Lynn Hytes, Jeffrey Bowyer-Chapman, and Stacey McKenzie.

The episode won a Canadian Screen Award for Best Direction in a Reality/Competition Series and was nominated for Best Sound in a Non-Fiction Series at the 9th Canadian Screen Awards.

== Episode ==
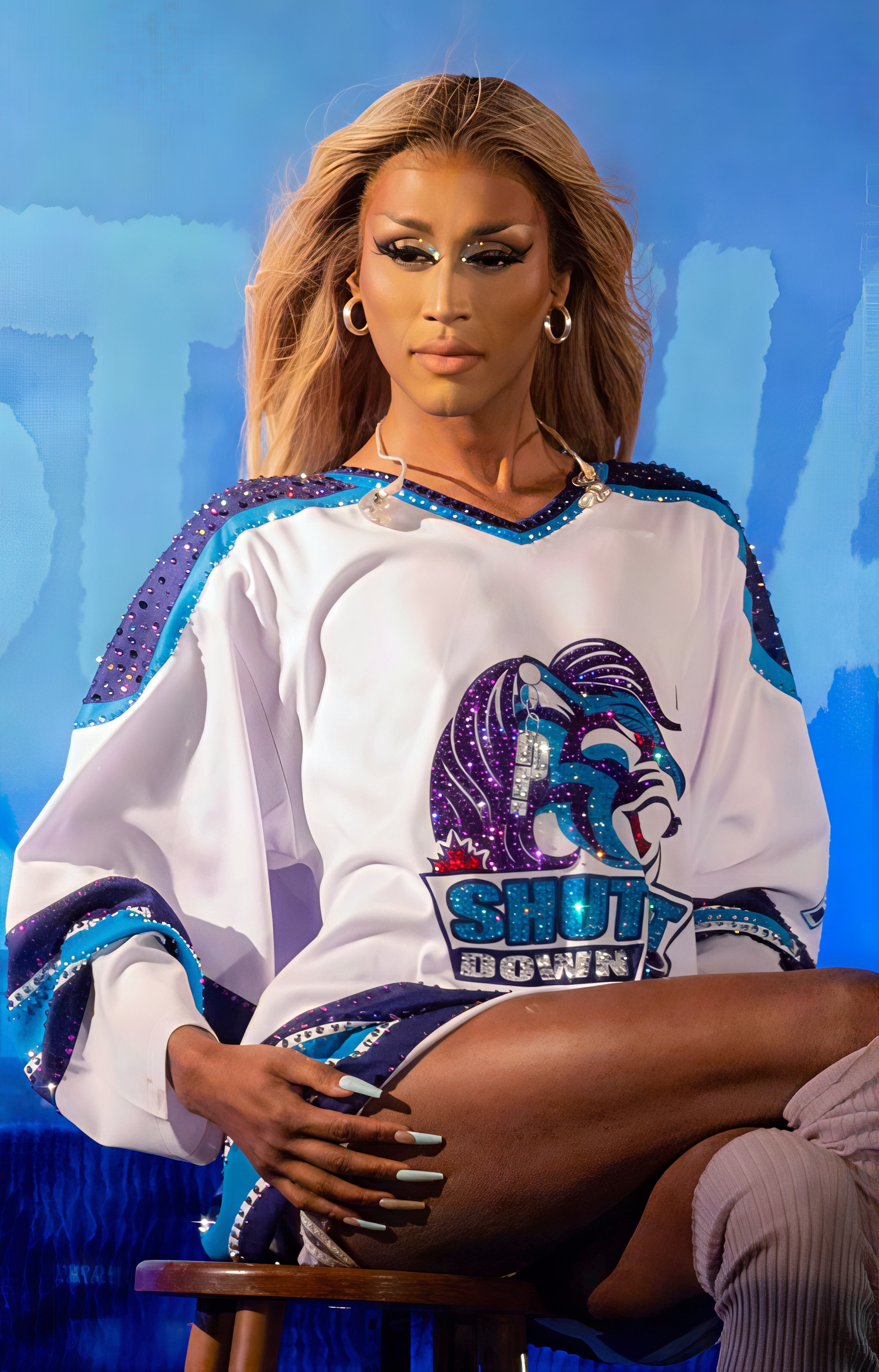
Priyanka (pictured in 2024) is crowned the winner.

For the maxi challenge the final top three queens, Priyanka, Rita Baga, and Scarlett Bobo, will write and record verses for a remix of RuPaul's "U Wear It Well", then learn choreography and perform the remix on the main stage. They also get interviewed by Jeffrey and Traci. The song, subtitled the Queens of the North Ru-Mix, was released on September 19, 2020 by World of Wonder Productions for streaming and digital download. After a lip sync performance of the remix the top three queens walk the runway a final time with the category "Coronation Eleganza". After final critiques they return to the workroom and are greeted by the eliminated queens. Back on the runway the eliminated queens walk the runway in their "Coronation Eleganza" before the top three queens are told they will all be lipsyncing for the crown.

Priyanka, Rita Baga, and Scarlett Bobo lipsync to "You're a Superstar" by Love Inc. After the lipsync Priyanka is declared the winner and is crowned Canada's First Drag Superstar, with Rita Baga and Scarlett Bobo finishing as runner-ups.

== Production ==
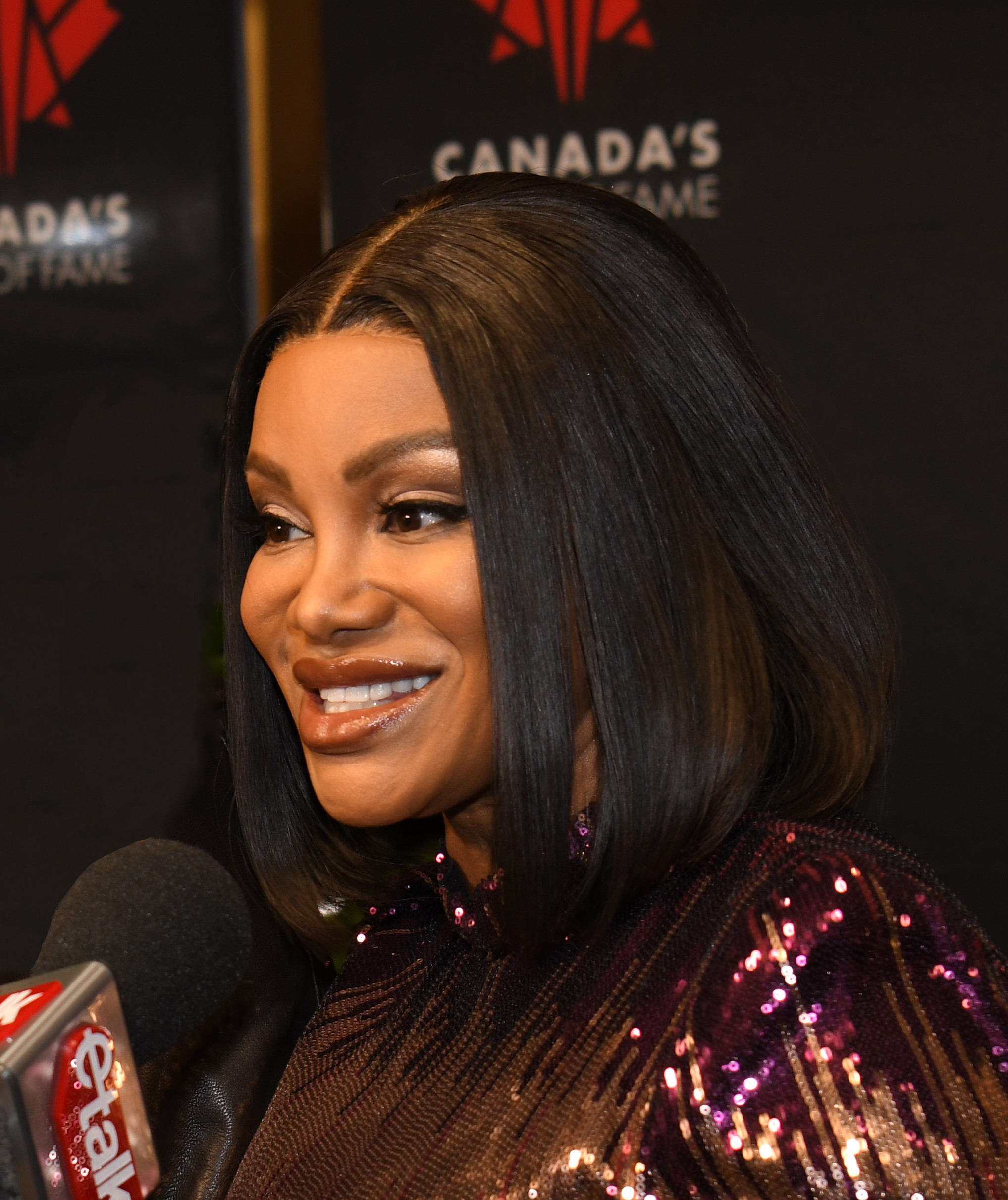
Traci Melchor (pictured in 2022) is a guest host.

The episode originally aired on September 3, 2020.

=== Fashion ===
Ilona Verley's Coronation Eleganza look blended a First Nations jingle dress with Ilona Verley's signature pastel colours along red handprints. Ilona Verley also used a red glove to cover her mouth, a reference to the red handprint symbol from the Missing and Murdered Indigenous Women and Girls Movement. Ilona Verley's look and its presentation received praise for sharing the message of the MMIWG movement. Jaylene Tyme also referenced the red handprint in tribute to the movement in her entrance look for Canada's Drag Race season 5.

== Reception ==
The episode won a Canadian Screen Award for Best Direction in a Reality/Competition Series for director Shelagh O'Brien at the 9th Canadian Screen Awards. It was also nominated for Best Sound in a Non-Fiction Series for John Diemer, Scott Brachmeyer, Daniel Hewett, Dane Kelly, Sarah Labadie, Carlo Scrignaro, and Rob Taylor.
