= Canada's Drag Race season 1 =

2020 season of Canada's Drag Race

Canada's Drag Race
- Season 1
- Promotional poster for season one
- Judges: Brooke Lynn Hytes; Jeffrey Bowyer-Chapman; Stacey McKenzie
- No. of contestants: 12
- Winner: Priyanka
- Runners-up: Rita Baga; Scarlett BoBo
- No. of episodes: 10

Release
- Original network: Crave
- Original release: July 2 – September 3, 2020

Season chronology
- Next → Season 2

The first season of Canada's Drag Race premiered on July 2, 2020. The cast was announced on May 14, 2020. The winner of the first season of Canada's Drag Race was Priyanka, with Rita Baga and Scarlett BoBo as runners-up.

The season consisted of ten one-hour episodes.

The Season 1 queens participated in a Canada's Drag Race Anniversary Extravaganza reunion special, airing on Crave September 6, 2021, in advance of the second season launch.

== Production ==
Casting occurred in mid-2019 with production starting in fall 2019. On September 26, 2019, it was announced that the judges panel will include RuPaul's Drag Race season 11 runner-up Brooke Lynn Hytes, actor Jeffrey Bowyer-Chapman and fashion model Stacey McKenzie. Bell Media personality Traci Melchor also appeared as a recurring cast member, with the title "Canada's Squirrel Friend"; her role entailed participatory support in challenges, including co-judging the Canada Gay-M mini-challenge, hosting a sheTalk red carpet segment prior to Snatch Game, and serving as one of the judges of the Miss Loose Jaw pageant. Melchor also appeared as the special guest host for the season finale.

The series was shot in Hamilton, Ontario.

== Contestants ==
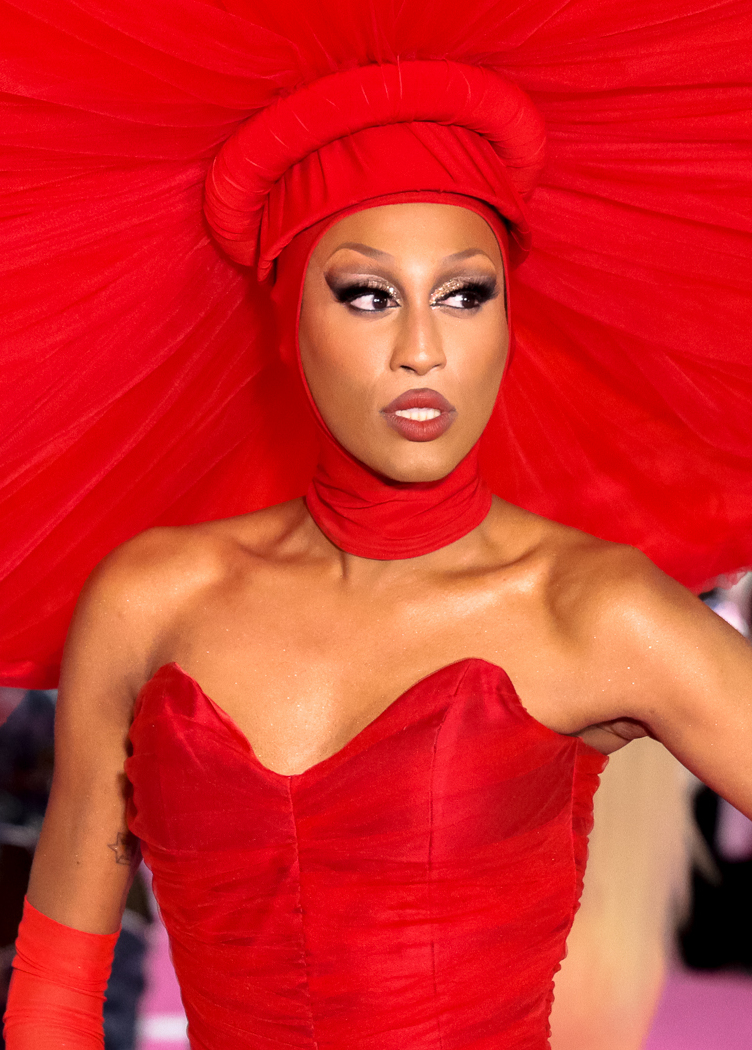
The winner, Priyanka.

Canada's Drag Race season 1 contestants and their backgrounds (Note: All ages, names, with hometowns, and outcome are stated at time of filming.)
Contestant	Age	Hometown	Outcome
Priyanka	28	Toronto, Ontario	Winner
Rita Baga	32	Montreal, Quebec	Runners-up
Scarlett BoBo	29	Toronto, Ontario	Runners-up
Jimbo	36	Victoria, British Columbia	4th place
Lemon	23	New York City, United States	5th place
Ilona Verley	24	Vancouver, British Columbia	6th place
BOA (Note: Bitch On Arrival is referred to as BOA on the show.)	24	Windsor, Ontario	7th place
Kiara (Note: Kiara Schatzi is referred to as Kiara on the show.)	22	Montreal, Quebec	8th place
Tynomi Banks	38	Toronto, Ontario	9th place
Anastarzia Anaquway	37	East York, Ontario	10th place
Kyne	21	Kitchener-Waterloo, Ontario	11th place
Juice Boxx	31	Essex, Ontario	12th place

Footnotes

== Contestant progress ==
Legend:

Priyanka won Canada's Drag Race season 1.
Rita Baga and Scarlett BoBo were the runners-up.
WIN indicates that the contestant won the challenge.
SAFE indicates that the contestant was declared safe by the judges.
BTM (Bottom) indicates that the contestant was up for elimination.
ELIM (Eliminated) indicates that the contestant was eliminated.
Guest indicates that the contestant returned as a guest.

Contestants progress with placements in each episode
Contestant	Episode									
Contestant	1	2	3	4	5	6	7	8	9	10
Priyanka	SAFE	SAFE	WIN	SAFE	BTM	SAFE	BTM	WIN	SAFE	Winner
Rita Baga	WIN	SAFE	SAFE	WIN	SAFE	WIN	SAFE	BTM	BTM	Runner-up
Scarlett BoBo	SAFE	SAFE	SAFE	SAFE	SAFE	SAFE	SAFE	SAFE	WIN	Runner-up
Jimbo	SAFE	SAFE	SAFE	SAFE	WIN	SAFE	SAFE	SAFE	ELIM	Guest
Lemon	BTM	WIN	SAFE	SAFE	SAFE	SAFE	WIN	ELIM		Guest
Ilona Verley	SAFE	SAFE	SAFE	BTM	SAFE	BTM	ELIM			Guest
BOA	SAFE	SAFE	SAFE	SAFE	SAFE	ELIM				Guest
Kiara	SAFE	SAFE	SAFE	SAFE	ELIM					Guest
Tynomi Banks	SAFE	BTM	BTM	ELIM						Guest
Anastarzia Anaquway	SAFE	SAFE	ELIM							Guest
Kyne	SAFE	ELIM								Guest
Juice Boxx	ELIM									Guest

== Lip syncs ==
Legend:

The contestant was eliminated after their first time in the bottom.
The contestant was eliminated after their second time in the bottom.
The contestant was eliminated after their third time in the bottom.
The contestant won the Lip Sync for the Crown and was declared the winner of the season.

Episode	Contestants			Song	Eliminated
1	Juice Boxx	vs.	Lemon	"I Really Like You" (Carly Rae Jepsen)	Juice Boxx
2	Kyne	vs.	Tynomi Banks	"If You Could Read My Mind" (Amber, Jocelyn Enriquez, Ultra Naté)	Kyne
3	Anastarzia Anaquway	vs.	Tynomi Banks	"Absolutely Not (Chanel Club Mix)" (Deborah Cox)	Anastarzia Anaquway
4	Ilona Verley	vs.	Tynomi Banks	"Girlfriend" (Avril Lavigne)	Tynomi Banks
5	Kiara	vs.	Priyanka	"I Drove All Night" (Céline Dion)	Kiara
6	BOA	vs.	Ilona Verley	"Scars to Your Beautiful" (Alessia Cara)	BOA
7	Ilona Verley	vs.	Priyanka	"Hello" (Allie X)	Ilona Verley
8	Lemon	vs.	Rita Baga	"You Oughta Know" (Alanis Morissette)	Lemon
9	Jimbo	vs.	Rita Baga	"Closer" (Tegan and Sara)	Jimbo
Episode	Final contestants			Song	Winner
10	Priyanka vs. Rita Baga vs. Scarlett BoBo			"You're a Superstar" (Love Inc.)	Priyanka

== Guest hosts ==
The guest host of a Canada's Drag Race episode performs much of RuPaul's role in a regular Ru-hosted season, including the introductions to the runway and Lip Sync for Your Life segments, and delivers commentary as a judge, but does not have a direct say in determining the winners or losers of the challenges and lip-syncs. Season 1 guest hosts included:

- Elisha Cuthbert, actress
- Jade Hassouné, actor, dancer and singer
- Deborah Cox, singer-songwriter and actress
- Evan Biddell, designer
- Mary Walsh, actress, comedian and actor
- Tom Green, comedian and actor
- Allie X, singer-songwriter
- Amanda Brugel, actress
- Michelle Visage, American singer and main judge on RuPaul's Drag Race and RuPaul's Drag Race UK
- Traci Melchor, television personality

=== Special guests ===
Guests who appeared in episodes, but did not judge on the main stage.

Episode 1

- Matt Barnes, photographer

Episode 3 and 10

- Ralph, singer
- Hollywood Jade, choreographer

Episode 5

- Colin McAllister and Justin Ryan, interior decorators and television presenters

Episode 6

- Crystal, contestant from RuPaul's Drag Race UK Series 1

Episode 7

- Stefan Brogren, actor and producer
- Michelle DuBarry, Canadian drag queen

Episode 9

- Sabrina Jalees, comedian

== Episodes ==
No. overall	No. in season	Title	Original release date
1	1	"Eh-laganza Eh-xtravaganza"	July 2, 2020
Twelve new queens enter the workroom. For the first mini-challenge, the queens do a photoshoot atop a replica of the Rocky Mountains. Kyne wins the mini-challenge. For the main challenge, the queens create a couture outfit from a box of items themed around various aspects of Canada.: Anastarzia Anaquway - Canada Gay; BOA - Man of Green Gay-bles; Ilona Verley - Muskokurrrrr; Jimbo - Rain-Blow It Up; Juice Boxx - Much Ru-sic Video Prance; Kiara - Like A Prairie; Kyne - Yukon Gold Digger; Lemon - Jock Scraps; Priyanka - Gone Fishy; Scarlett BoBo - Glampede; Rita Baga - Québec-Froid; Tynomi Banks - Lumber Janes; On the runway, BOA, Jimbo and Rita Baga receive positive critiques, with Rita Baga winning the challenge. Juice Boxx, Kyne and Lemon receive negative critiques, with Kyne being safe. Juice Boxx and Lemon lip-sync to "I Really Like You" by Carly Rae Jepsen. Lemon wins the lip-sync and Juice Boxx is the first queen to sashay away.: Guest Host: Elisha Cuthbert; Mini-Challenge: Photoshoot atop a replica of the Rocky Mountains; Mini-Challenge Winner: Kyne; Mini-Challenge Prize: $1,000 of latex couture from Polymorphe; Main Challenge: Create a couture outfit from a box of items themed around various aspects of Canada; Challenge Winner: Rita Baga; Main Challenge Prize: A $5,000 shopping spree from Roots Canada; Bottom Two: Juice Boxx and Lemon; Lip Sync Song: "I Really Like You" by Carly Rae Jepsen; Eliminated: Juice Boxx; Farewell message: "Hey cunts. Season 1!!! I love you all so much. Don't let the comp get to you. We are ALL! sickening. lots of love sisters. xoxo Juice Boxx"
2	2	"Her-itage Moments"	July 9, 2020
For this week's mini-challenge, the queens get into quick drag and audition for a role as a ballerina in "The Nutsmacker". Anastarzia Anaquway and BOA win the mini-challenge. For the main challenge, the queens team up and overact in parodies of Heritage Minutes.: I Smell Burnt Tucks - Anastarzia Anaquway, Kiara, Lemon, Rita Baga and Tynomi Banks; The Muffragettes - BOA, Ilona Verley, Jimbo, Kyne, Priyanka and Scarlett BoBo; On the runway, category is Not My First Time. Jimbo, Kiara, Lemon and Priyanka receive positive critiques, with Lemon winning the challenge. BOA, Kyne and Tynomi Banks receive negative critiques, with BOA being safe. Kyne and Tynomi Banks lip-sync to "If You Could Read My Mind" by Ultra Naté, Amber, and Jocelyn Enriquez. Tynomi Banks wins the lip-sync and Kyne sashays away.: Guest Host: Jade Hassouné; Mini-Challenge: Get into quick drag and audition for a role as a ballerina in "The Nutsmacker"; Mini-Challenge Winner: Anastarzia Anaquway and BOA; Mini-Challenge Prize: A $1,000 gift certificate from Wigs And Grace; Main Challenge: In teams, overact in parodies of Heritage Minutes; Runway Theme: Not My First Time; Challenge Winner: Lemon; Challenge Prize: $5,000 worth of Anastasia Beverly Hills cosmetics; Bottom Two: Kyne and Tynomi Banks; Lip-Sync Song: "If You Could Read My Mind" by Ultra Naté, Amber, and Jocelyn Enriquez; Eliminated: Kyne; Farewell Message: "I love you Tynomi I love you all Think of me fondly, now that I've said goodbye. ♡ -Kyne"
3	3	"Not Sorry Aboot It"	July 16, 2020
For this week's mini-challenge, the queens get into quick drag and perform an audition for the morning show "Canada Gay M" while reading from a teleprompter in English, French, and "Draglish". Lemon and Priyanka win the mini-challenge. For the main challenge, the queens write, record, and perform verses to "Not Sorry Aboot It".: Team The Dwolls - BOA, Jimbo, Kiara, Lemon and Tynomi Banks; Team The Mooseknuckles - Anastarzia Anaquway, Ilona Verley, Priyanka, Rita Baga and Scarlett BoBo; On the runway, category is Que-Becky With the Good Hair. BOA, Scarlett BoBo and Priyanka receive positive critiques, with Priyanka winning the challenge. Anastarzia Anaquway, Ilona Verley, Kiara and Tynomi Banks receive negative critiques, with Ilona Verley and Kiara being safe. Anastarzia Anaquway and Tynomi Banks lip-sync to "Absolutely Not (Chanel Club Mix)" by Deborah Cox. Tynomi Banks wins the lip-sync and Anastarzia Anaquway sashays away.: Guest Host: Deborah Cox; Mini-Challenge: Get into quick drag and perform an audition for the morning show "Canada Gay M" while reading from a teleprompter in English, French, and "Draglish"; Mini-Challenge Winners: Lemon and Priyanka; Mini-Challenge Prize: $2,000 worth of drag jewels from Amped Accessories; Main Challenge: Write, record, and perform verses to "Not Sorry Aboot It"; Runway Theme: Que-Becky With the Good Hair; Challenge Winner: Priyanka; Challenge Prize: A luxury stay at the Hilton Lac-Leamy; Bottom Two: Anastarzia Anaquway and Tynomi Banks; Lip-Sync Song: "Absolutely Not (Chanel Club Mix)" by Deborah Cox; Eliminated: Anastarzia Anaquway; Farewell Message: [None]
4	4	"Single-Use Queens"	July 23, 2020
For this week's mini-challenge, the queens play a memory game with the pit crew's underwear colors. Jimbo wins the mini-challenge. For the main challenge, the queens team up to create a cohesive fashion line made out of garbage.: Metal - BOA, Lemon and Priyanka; Paper - Ilona Verley, Jimbo and Tynomi Banks; Plastic - Kiara, Rita Baga and Scarlett BoBo; On the runway, team Plastic is the winning team, with Rita Baga winning the challenge. Team Metal and Team Paper are the losing teams. BOA, Ilona Verley, Jimbo and Tynomi Banks receive negative critiques, with BOA and Jimbo being safe. Ilona Verley and Tynomi Banks lip-sync to "Girlfriend" by Avril Lavigne. Ilona Verley wins the lip-sync and Tynomi Banks sashays away.: Guest Host: Evan Biddell; Mini-Challenge: Play a memory game with the pit crew's underwear colors; Mini-Challenge Winner: Jimbo; Mini-Challenge Prize: A VIP stay at the Hilton Toronto; Main Challenge: In teams, create a cohesive fashion line made out of garbage; Challenge Winner: Rita Baga; Challenge Prize: A shopping spree at Fabric Land; Bottom Two: Ilona Verley and Tynomi Banks; Lip-Sync Song: "Girlfriend" by Avril Lavigne; Eliminated: Tynomi Banks; Farewell Message: "SISTERS 4 LIFE. Love life. Be you! Tynomi Banks"
5	5	"Snatch Game"	July 30, 2020
For this week's mini-challenge, the queens read each other to filth. Lemon wins the mini-challenge. For the main challenge, the queens play the Snatch Game. Colin McAllister and Justin Ryan star as the celebrity contestants. The cast consisted of: BOA as Gypsy Rose Blanchard; Ilona Verley as Rebecca More; Jimbo as Joan Rivers; Kiara as Mariah Carey; Lemon as JoJo Siwa; Priyanka as Miss Cleo; Rita Baga as Édith Piaf; Scarlett BoBo as Liza Minnelli; On the runway, category is Night of a Thousand Céline Dion's. Jimbo, Lemon and Rita Baga receive positive critiques, with Jimbo winning the challenge. BOA, Kiara and Priyanka receive negative critiques, with BOA being safe. Kiara and Priyanka lip-sync to "I Drove All Night" by Céline Dion. Priyanka wins the lip-sync and Kiara sashays away.: Guest Host: Mary Walsh; Mini-Challenge: Reading Is Fundamental; Mini-Challenge Winner: Lemon; Mini-Challenge Prize: $1,000 gift card to LAGconcepts; Main Challenge: Snatch Game; Runway Theme: Night of a Thousand Céline Dion's; Challenge Winner: Jimbo; Challenge Prize: A Cruise; Bottom Two: Kiara and Priyanka; Lip-Sync Song: "I Drove All Night" by Céline Dion; Eliminated: Kiara; Farewell Message: "KIARA. Love you guys, have fun cleaning"
6	6	"Star Sixty-Nine"	August 6, 2020
For this week's mini-challenge, the queens get into quick drag and play psychic hotline operators. Lemon wins the mini-challenge. For the main challenge, the queens team up to write and produce commercials for fictional drag queen law firms.: Kitty & Kat - Lemon and Priyanka; Sarah & Sarahson - Ilona Verley and Scarlett BoBo; The B.E.L.L.E.S. - BOA, Jimbo and Rita Baga; On the runway, category is Canadian 'Tuck'-shedo. Jimbo, Rita Baga and Scarlett BoBo receive positive critiques, with Rita Baga winning the challenge. BOA, Ilona Verley and Lemon receive negative critiques, with Lemon being safe. BOA and Ilona Verley lip-sync to "Scars to Your Beautiful" by Alessia Cara. Ilona Verley wins the lip-sync and BOA sashays away.: Guest Host: Tom Green; Mini-Challenge: Get into quick drag and play psychic hotline operators; Mini-Challenge Winner: Lemon; Mini-Challenge Prize: $1,000 worth of Bailey Nelson eyewear; Main Challenge: In teams, write and produce commercials for fictional drag queen law firms; Runway Theme: Canadian 'Tuck'-shedo; Challenge Winner: Rita Baga; Challenge Prize: A $10,000 custom-designed wardrobe from Northbound Leather; Bottom Two: BOA and Ilona Verley; Lip-Sync Song: "Scars to Your Beautiful" by Alessia Cara; Eliminated: BOA; Farewell Message: "NICE! -BOA♡"
7	7	"Miss Loose Jaw"	August 13, 2020
For this week's main challenge, the queens compete in The Miss Loose Jaw Pageant.: Ilona Verley - Miss Erable; Jimbo - Miss Behavin'; Lemon - Miss Fitts; Priyanka - Miss Demeanor; Rita Baga - Miss Match'd; Scarlett BoBo - Miss Informed; On the runway, category is Pageant Perfection. Lemon and Scarlett BoBo receive positive critiques, with Lemon winning the challenge. Ilona Verley, Jimbo and Priyanka receive negative critiques, with Jimbo being safe. Ilona Verley and Priyanka lip-sync to "Hello" by Allie X. Priyanka wins the lip-sync and Ilona Verley sashays away.: Guest Host: Allie X; Main Challenge: Compete in The Miss Loose Jaw Pageant; Runway Theme: Pageant Perfection; Challenge Winner: Lemon; Challenge Prize: A trip for two to Iceland from Pink Iceland; Bottom Two: Ilona Verley and Priyanka; Lip-Sync Song: "Hello" by Allie X; Eliminated: Ilona Verley; Farewell Message: "Our world is changing for the better and I am blessed to be a part of that change. ♡ ILONA"
8	8	"Welcome to the Family"	August 20, 2020
For this week's mini-challenge, the queens have a bitchfest with puppets. Scarlett BoBo wins the mini-challenge. For the main challenge, the queens Makeover LGBT refugees who have recently moved to Canada through Rainbow Railroad. On the runway, category is A Family Affair. Priyanka and Scarlett BoBo receive positive critiques, with Priyanka winning the challenge. Jimbo, Lemon and Rita Baga receive negative critiques, with Jimbo being safe. Lemon and Rita Baga lip-sync to "You Oughta Know" by Alanis Morissette. Rita Baga wins the lip-sync and Lemon sashays away.: Guest Host: Amanda Brugel; Mini-Challenge: Everybody Loves Puppets; Mini-Challenge Winner: Scarlett BoBo; Mini-Challenge Prize: A trip for two to Cuba and assign the makeover pairs; Main Challenge: Makeover LGBT refugees who have recently moved to Canada through Rainbow Railroad; Runway Theme: A Family Affair; Challenge Winner: Priyanka; Challenge Prize: A $10,000 donation in the winner's name to Rainbow Railroad; Bottom Two: Lemon and Rita Baga; Lip-Sync Song: "You Oughta Know" by Alanis Morissette; Eliminated: Lemon; Farewell Message: "To my Top 4: I LOVE YOU, I'M PROUD OF YOU, & YOU'RE ALL DUMB + UGLY ♡ xoxo, Lemon"
9	9	"The Snow Ball"	August 27, 2020
For this week's mini-challenge, the queens sing "O Canada" as a local chanteuse. Rita Baga wins the mini-challenge. For the main challenge, the queens create three looks for The Snow Ball: Executive Holiday Party Realness, Icy Walk of Shame and Ice Queen Eleganza. On the runway, Scarlett BoBo wins the challenge. Jimbo and Rita Baga receive negative critiques, and are announced as the bottom two. They lip-sync to "Closer" by Tegan and Sara. Rita Baga wins the lip-sync and Jimbo sashays away.: Guest Host: Michelle Visage; Mini-Challenge: Sing "O Canada" as a local chanteuse; Mini-Challenge Winner: Rita Baga; Mini-Challenge Prize: A $1,000 gift certificate courtesy of Dirt Squirrel; Main Challenge: The Snow Ball; Runway Themes: Executive Holiday Party Realness, Icy Walk of Shame and Ice Queen Eleganza; Challenge Winner: Scarlett BoBo; Challenge Prize: A 7 day trip for two to Vienna, courtesy of Air Canada Vacations; Bottom Two: Jimbo and Rita Baga; Lip-Sync Song: "Closer" by Tegan and Sara; Eliminated: Jimbo; Farewell Message: "LIFE IS THE TRUE DRAG COMPETITION BE REAL, SPREAD ~~YOUR LEGS~~ LOVE AND WIN XOXO JIMBO"
10	10	"U Wear It Well"	September 3, 2020
For the final challenge of the season, the queens write, record and perform verses to a remix of RuPaul's "U Wear It Well" On the runway, category is Coronation Eleganza. The eliminated queens all return to the runway. The three finalists are told that they will be lip-syncing to "You're a Superstar" by Love Inc.. It is announced that Priyanka is the winner, leaving Rita Baga and Scarlett BoBo as the runners-up.: Guest Host: Traci Melchor; Main Challenge: Write, record and perform verses to a remix of RuPaul's "U Wear It Well"; Runway Theme: Coronation Eleganza; Lip-Sync Song: "You're a Superstar" by Love Inc.; Runners-up: Rita Baga and Scarlett BoBo; Winner of Canada's Drag Race Season One: Priyanka

== Post-production ==
=== Drag Ball and Drag Superstars ===
Separately from the production of the series, all of the queens from the season participated in Pride events for both Pride Toronto and Fierté Montreal, presented as online streaming specials due to the COVID-19 pandemic in Canada. The Toronto event, Drag Ball presented by Crave, was streamed on June 27, and the Montreal event, Drag Superstars, was streamed on August 14. The Toronto special was directly produced by Crave; the Montreal event was produced by a separate company, but received some production assistance and sponsorship from Crave and the Canada's Drag Race production team.

=== Canada's Drag Race Live at the Drive-In ===
Following the conclusion of the season, the cast announced a cross-Canada tour, to be performed at drive-in venues due to the ongoing social distancing restrictions remaining in place during the COVID-19 pandemic. Brooke Lynn Hytes hosted, and Priyanka, Scarlett Bobo and Rita Baga were scheduled to appear at every date on the tour, while other cast members would perform at selected dates based on availability; ultimately, however, both Priyanka and Brooke Lynn Hytes had to miss a couple of later dates after being forced to self-isolate due to COVID-19 exposure.

Priyanka, Scarlett Bobo, Rita Baga and Jimbo also participated in an online panel as part of the 2020 Just for Laughs festival.

== Awards ==
Award	Date of ceremony	Category	Nominees	Result	Ref.
Canadian Screen Awards	May 17–20, 2021	Best Reality/Competition Program or Series	Michael Kot, Laura Michalchyshyn, Betty Orr, Mike Bickerton, Pam McNair, RuPaul Charles, Fenton Bailey, Randy Barbato, Tom Campbell, Randy Lennox, Tracey Pearce	Won	
Canadian Screen Awards	May 17–20, 2021	Best Host or Presenter in Factual or Reality/Competition	Jeffrey Bowyer-Chapman, Brooke Lynn Hytes, Stacey McKenzie	Won	
Canadian Screen Awards	May 17–20, 2021	Best Casting	Heather Muir	Nominated	
Canadian Screen Awards	May 17–20, 2021	Best Direction in a Reality/Competition Series	Shelagh O'Brien — "U Wear It Well"	Won	
Canadian Screen Awards	May 17–20, 2021	Best Writing in a Reality/Competition Series	Mike Bickerton, Elvira Kurt, Jen Markowitz — "Welcome to the Family"	Won	
Canadian Screen Awards	May 17–20, 2021	Best Sound in a Non-Fiction Series	John Diemer, Scott Brachmeyer, Daniel Hewett, Dane Kelly, Sarah Labadie, Carlo Scrignaro, Rob Taylor — "U Wear It Well"	Nominated	
Canadian Screen Awards	May 17–20, 2021	Best Production Design or Art Direction in a Non-Fiction Series	Peter Faragher — "Eh-Laganza Eh-Xtravaganza"	Won	
Canadian Screen Awards	May 17–20, 2021	Best Supporting Performance in a Web Program or Series	Priyanka — Drag Ball	Nominated	
Canadian Screen Awards	May 17–20, 2021	Best Host in a Web Program or Series	Traci Melchor — Drag Ball	Nominated	
Canadian Screen Awards	May 17–20, 2021	Audience Choice Award	Priyanka	Nominated	
Canadian Screen Awards	April 10, 2022	Best Variety or Entertainment Special	Canada’s Drag Race Anniversary Extravaganza	Won	
American Reality Television Awards	July 8, 2021	International Reality Series	Canada's Drag Race	Nominated	
