= Welcome to the Family (Canada's Drag Race) =

- Canada's Drag Race episode
- Episode no.: Season 1 Episode 8
- Original air date: August 20, 2020

Guest appearances
- Amanda Brugel (guest host); Kimahli Powell

Episode chronology
← Previous "Miss Loose Jaw"	Next → "The Snow Ball"
- Canada's Drag Race season 1

"Welcome to the Family" is the eighth episode of the first season of the Canadian reality competition television series Canada's Drag Race, which aired on August 20, 2020 on the television network Crave.

The episode sees contestants giving makeovers to Canadian newcomers who entered Canada with the help of Rainbow Railroad. Guest host for the episode is actress Amanda Brugel, who is joined by regular panelists Brooke Lynn Hytes, Jeffrey Bowyer-Chapman, and Stacey McKenzie.

The episode won a Canadian Screen Award for Best Writing in a Reality/Competition Series at the 9th Canadian Screen Awards.

== Episode ==
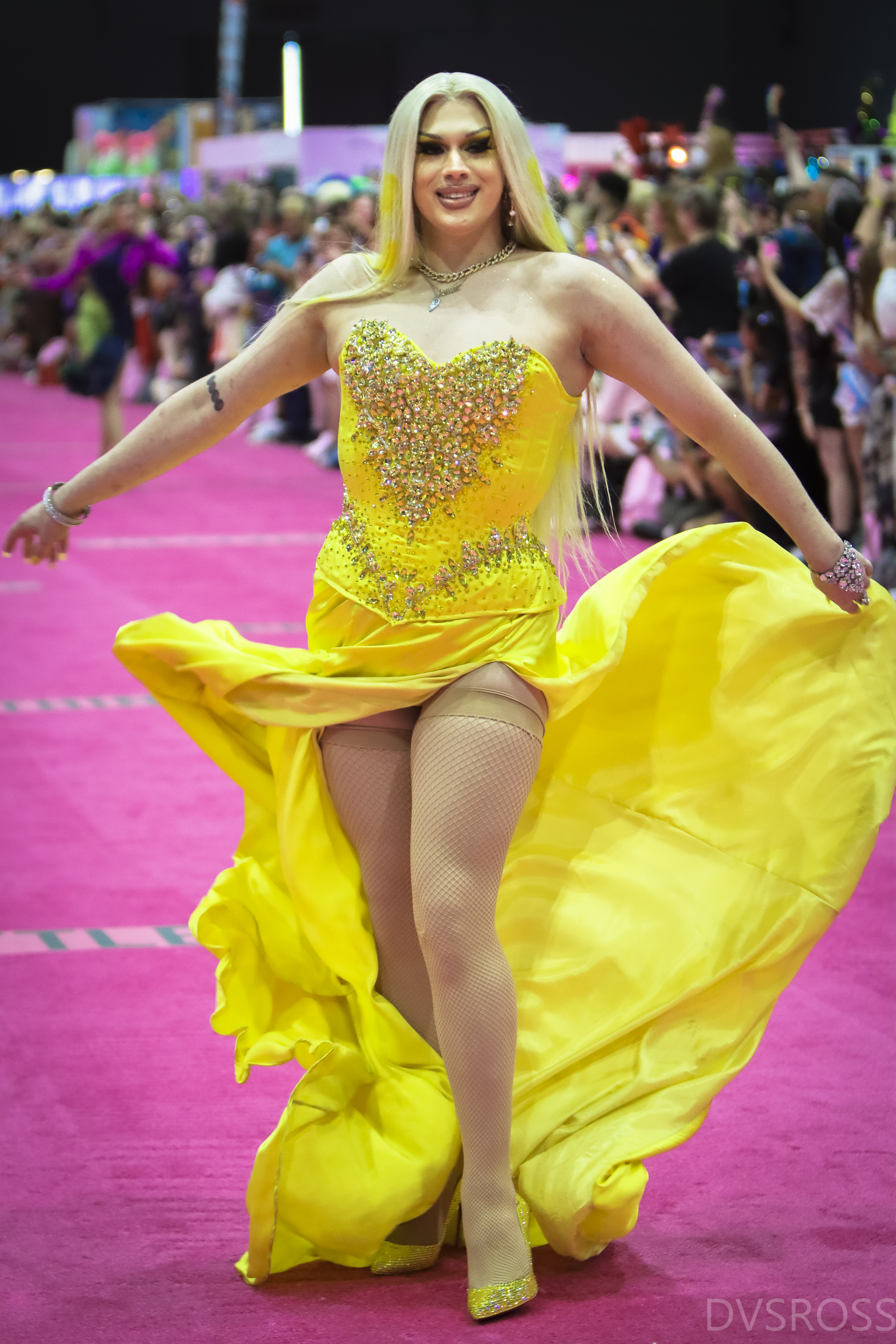
The episode sees Lemon eliminated.

The mini-challenge is Everybody Loves Puppets, where the queens use a puppet to poke fun at their fellow competitors. Jimbo gets Scarlett Bobo, Scarlett Bobo gets Rita Baga, Rita Baga gets Jimbo, and Priyanka and Lemon get each other. Scarlett Bobo wins the challenge.

For the maxi challenge the queens must makeover five newcomers to Canada into members of their drag families. The newcomers entered Canada with the help of Rainbow Railroad, a North American charitable organization that helps lesbian, gay, bisexual, transgender, queer, and intersex (LGBTQI) individuals escape violence and persecution in their home countries.

On the runway regular panelists Brooke Lynn Hytes, Jeffrey Bowyer-Chapman, and Stacey McKenzie are joined by Amanda Brugel as the guest host. Brugel is later a main panelist on Canada's Drag Race season 2. Priyanka is declared the winner of the challenge, with Jimbo and Scarlett Bobo being safe. Lemon and Rita Baga are up for elimination and lip sync to "You Oughta Know" by Alanis Morissette. Rita Baga wins the lip sync and Lemon is eliminated.

== Reception ==
The episode won a Canadian Screen Award for Best Writing in a Reality/Competition Series for Mike Bickerton, Elvira Kurt, and Jen Markowitz at the 9th Canadian Screen Awards in May 2021.
