= Jean jacket =

Jacket made of denim

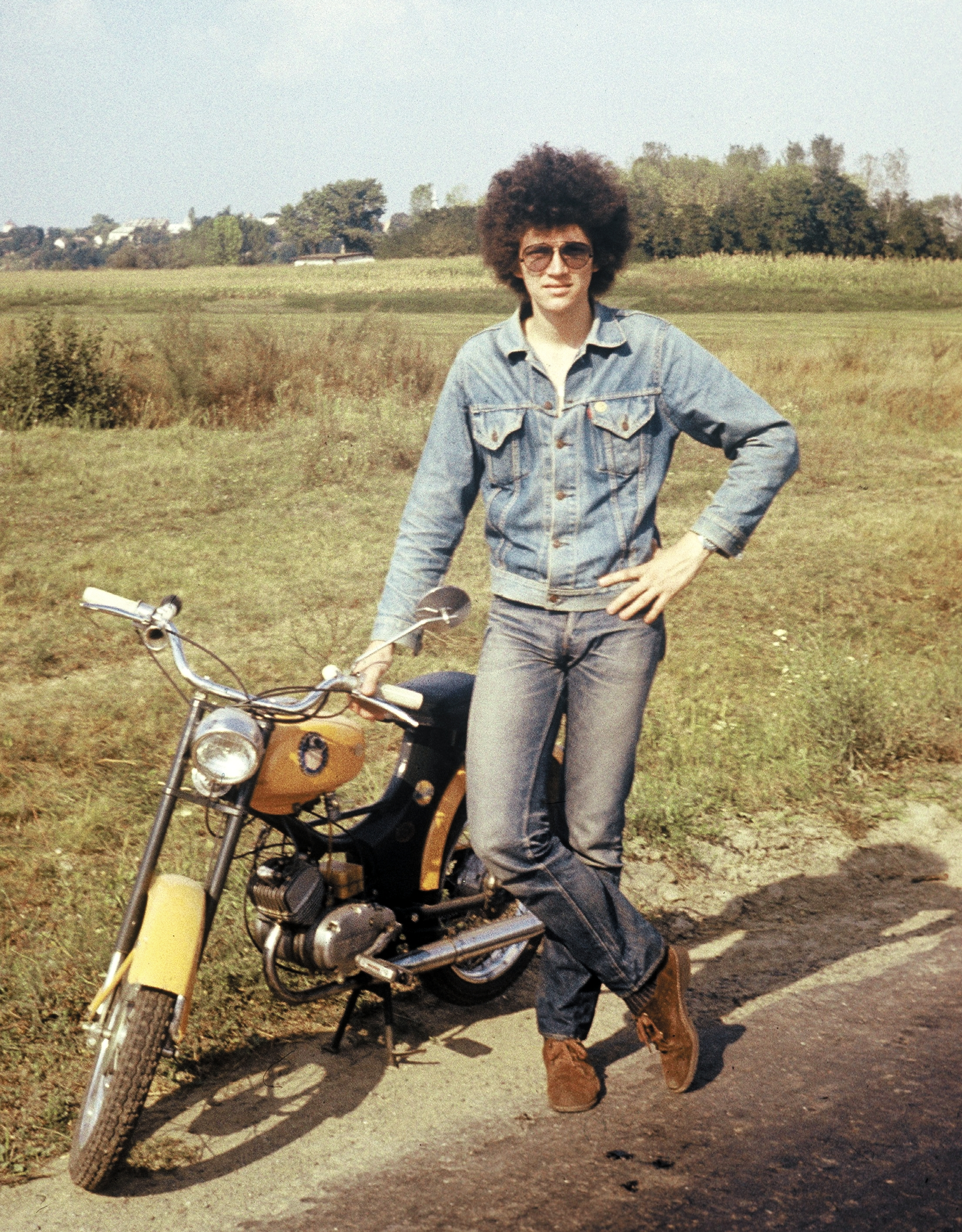
- A man pictured wearing a denim jacket in Hungary in 1976
- Type: Jacket
- Material: Denim
- Place of origin: United States

A denim jacket, also called a jean jacket, jeans jacket or trucker jacket, is a jacket made from denim. Introduced in the United States in the late 19th century, it has been a popular type of casual apparel with both men and women and has been described as an iconic element of American fashion. Though a staple of western wear, the denim jacket has also enjoyed a more general appeal.

== History ==
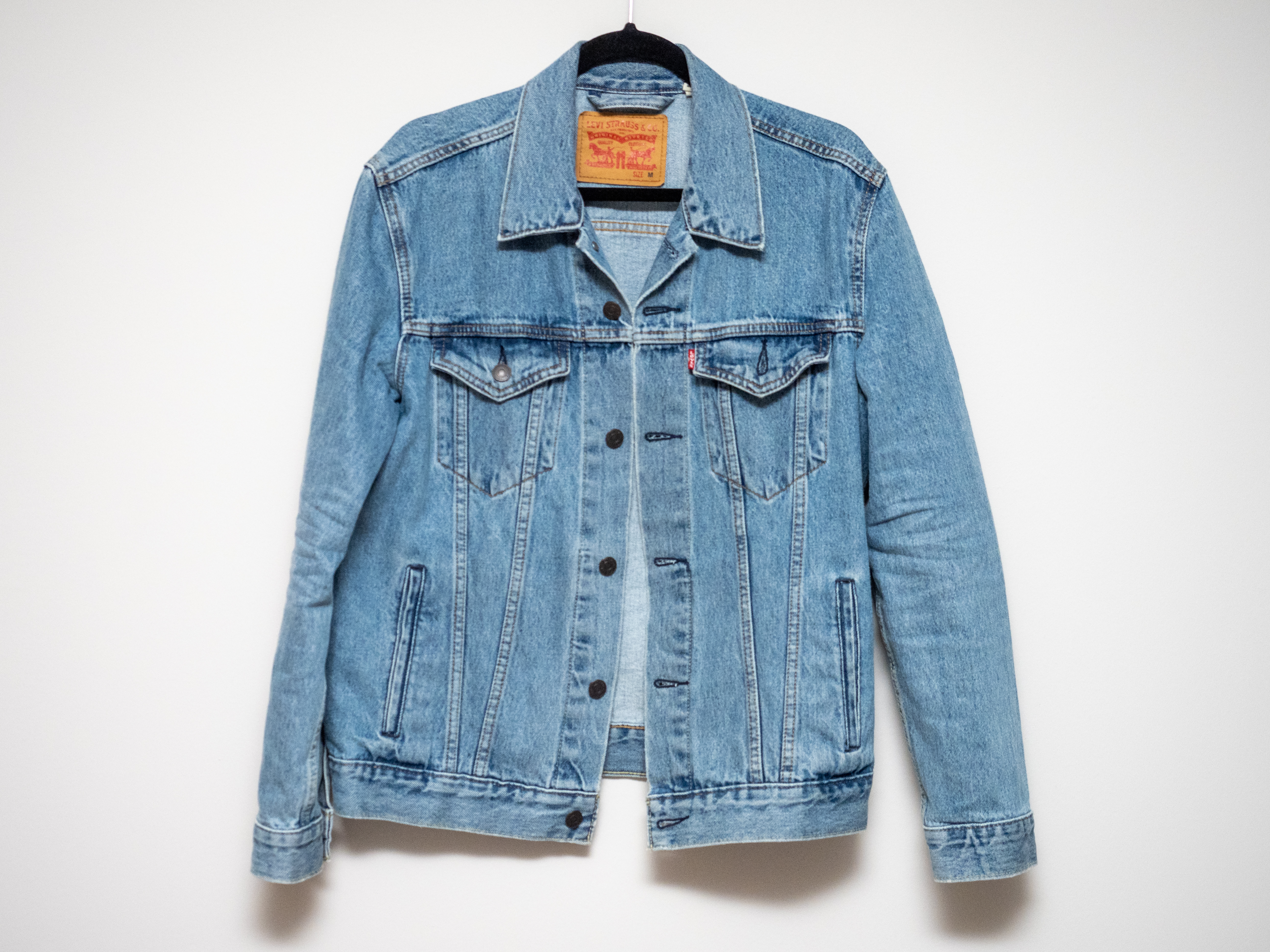
A Levi Strauss Type III jacket

The first recorded denim jacket is part of the collection of the German Historical Commission of the Rhineland (Stiftung Historische Kommission für die Rheinlande 1789–1815) and dates back to 1805 or 1810. In the United States the first recorded denim jacket is from about 1880, produced by German-born Jewish-American businessman Levi Strauss approximately ten years after he had begun selling jeans with copper rivets as a new type of work apparel intended for use by cowboys, miners, and railroad workers. Levi Strauss & Co. then introduced the "Type I" jacket, then known as the 506XX, in 1905. The Type I featured a boxy fit, a single chest pocket, and a rear buckle cinch. In 1953, Levi's reworked the Type I into what became known as the "Type II", which featured two symmetrical chest pockets and side adjuster tabs in place of the cinch. The "Type III" denim jacket was introduced by Levi's in 1962 (Note: Levi Strauss & Co. reports an introduction date of 1967, while the Wall Street Journal claims 1961, and Complex cites 1962.) and was designed by Jack Lucier. It has been described as the Denim jacket "to rule them all". Also known as "the trucker jacket", design elements of the Type III include a more tapered style than its predecessors, welt hand pockets, and bar tacks which hold down chest pocket and sleeve openings.

In 2014, Google collaborated with Levi Strauss & Co. to develop a "connected" denim jacket described by Wired as the "denim jacket of the future". The underlying technology, named "Jacquard", encompassed a processor, a built-in battery, and a special yarn that gave the bottom of the arm a pseudo-touchscreen functionality. The same year, New York Fashion Week featured several denim jackets, with The Guardian predicting that the denim jacket would "be everywhere in 2018". A second version of the Jacquard jacket, featuring an appearance closer to jackets without the technology as well as a lower price, was released in late 2019.

In addition to Levi Strauss & Co., companies designing denim jackets have included Wrangler, Calvin Klein, Tom Ford, Gucci, and Dior, among others.

A woman models a denim jacket.

== Cultural impact ==
According to GQ, there are "few things more iconic, more innately American, than a denim jacket" and the magazine has called it "a staple for stylish men". Jean jackets have also been popular with women.

Jean jackets, like jeans, are a major element of western wear; however, like jeans themselves, they have also enjoyed a more general appeal. Notable wearers of jean jackets have included western entertainers James Dean and John Lennon, as well as Polish anti-Communist dissident Jacek Kuroń. In 2017, GQ opined that Kanye West seemed to own "an alarming number of jean jackets", remarking that "he doesn't seem to go a few days without wearing one".

According to Levi Strauss & Co., the jean jacket has traditionally appealed to nonconformists as "a knock to the 'suits' of the world, its informal yet edgy heritage making it the ideal item to stick it to the man".

In the 2022 Jordan Peele film Nope, the flying alien is eventually referred to as "Jean Jacket", named after one of Em's horses.

== Wear and styling ==
While jean jackets are predominantly found in blue, denim can be dyed any color achievable with cotton, so jackets in colors such as white and violet also exist. As with jeans themselves, it is possible to buy "raw" or "dry" denim jean jackets, which have not been washed or distressed at the factory and instead fade and break in naturally over time with wear. Jean jackets with sherpa lining for warmth are also available.

=== Canadian tuxedo ===
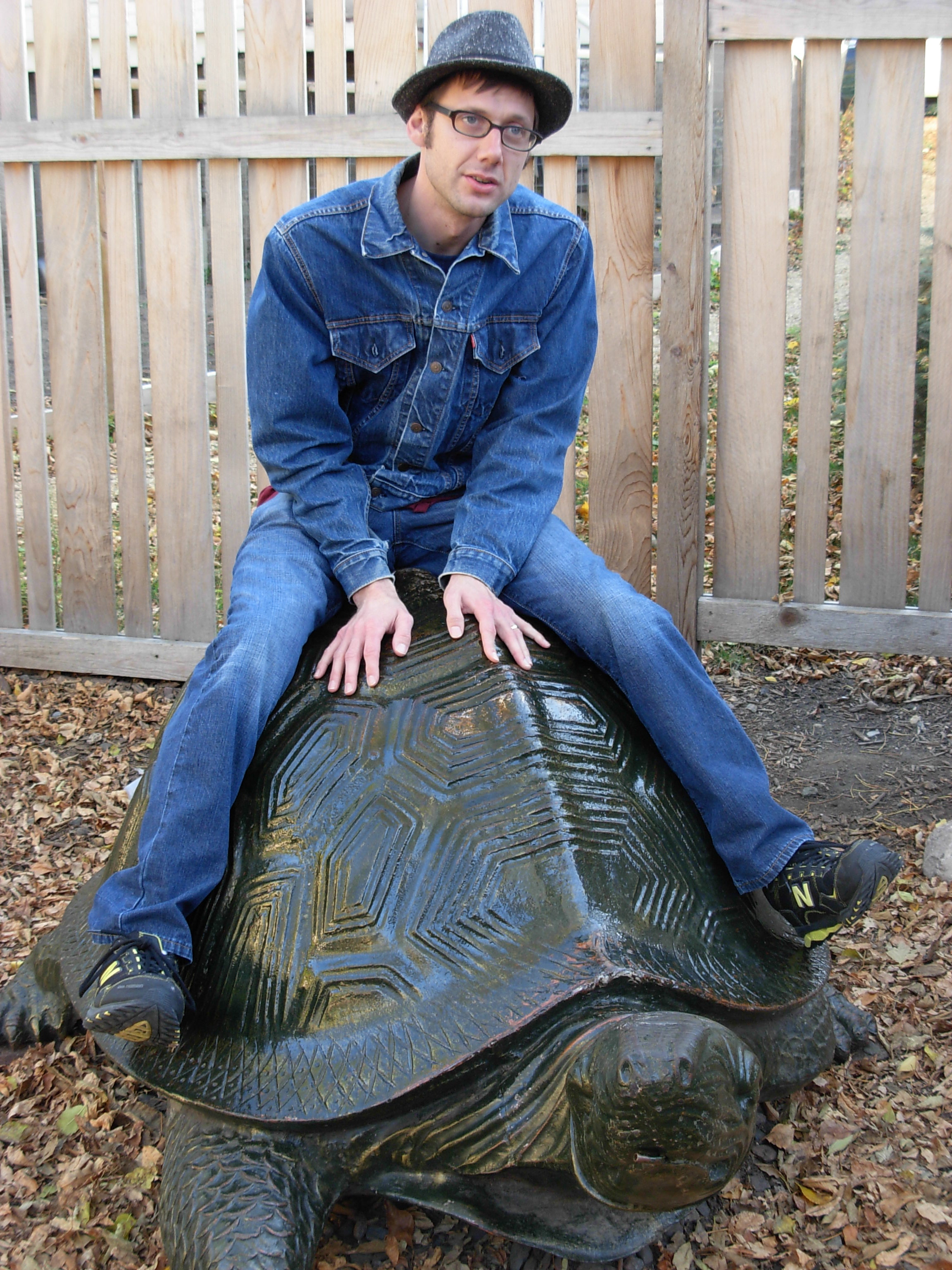
A man sitting on a statue of a tortoise and wearing a Canadian tuxedo

A "Canadian tuxedo" (also known as "double denim") is a colloquial term for wearing a jean shirt or denim jacket with jeans. The term reportedly originated in 1951 after Bing Crosby was refused entry to a hotel in Vancouver, British Columbia, because he was wearing a denim top and denim bottoms. After learning of the incident, Levi Strauss & Co. designed a tuxedo made entirely of denim for Crosby as a publicity stunt.

Despite its name, the "Canadian tuxedo" is not a specifically Canadian style, but is also closely correlated with images in American pop culture, such as the Marlboro Man.

The Crosby incident has been credited with helping to spur the evolution of denim from blue collar work wear into a fashion staple; however, the popularity of the full "Canadian tuxedo" look has varied, being accepted as stylish and on trend at some times and as a fashion faux pas at others. Some fashion stylists have asserted that the look works better if the jeans and the jacket are different colours than it does if they are the same shade. The "Canadian tuxedo" has also sometimes been interpreted as including a flannel shirt under the jacket, although this is not a universal definition.

The Canadian tuxedo achieved a "pop cultural peak" in 2001 when Britney Spears and Justin Timberlake wore the combination to that year's American Music Awards. In 2016, Prime Minister of Canada Justin Trudeau wore a "Canadian tuxedo" to a concert by The Tragically Hip. Lady Gaga has also worn a Canadian tuxedo in public.

In 2014, Levi Strauss produced a limited run of 200 replicas of the original Crosby tuxedo jacket as part of that year's line. Various fashion design houses have also produced couture interpretations of the "Canadian tuxedo".

== Gallery ==
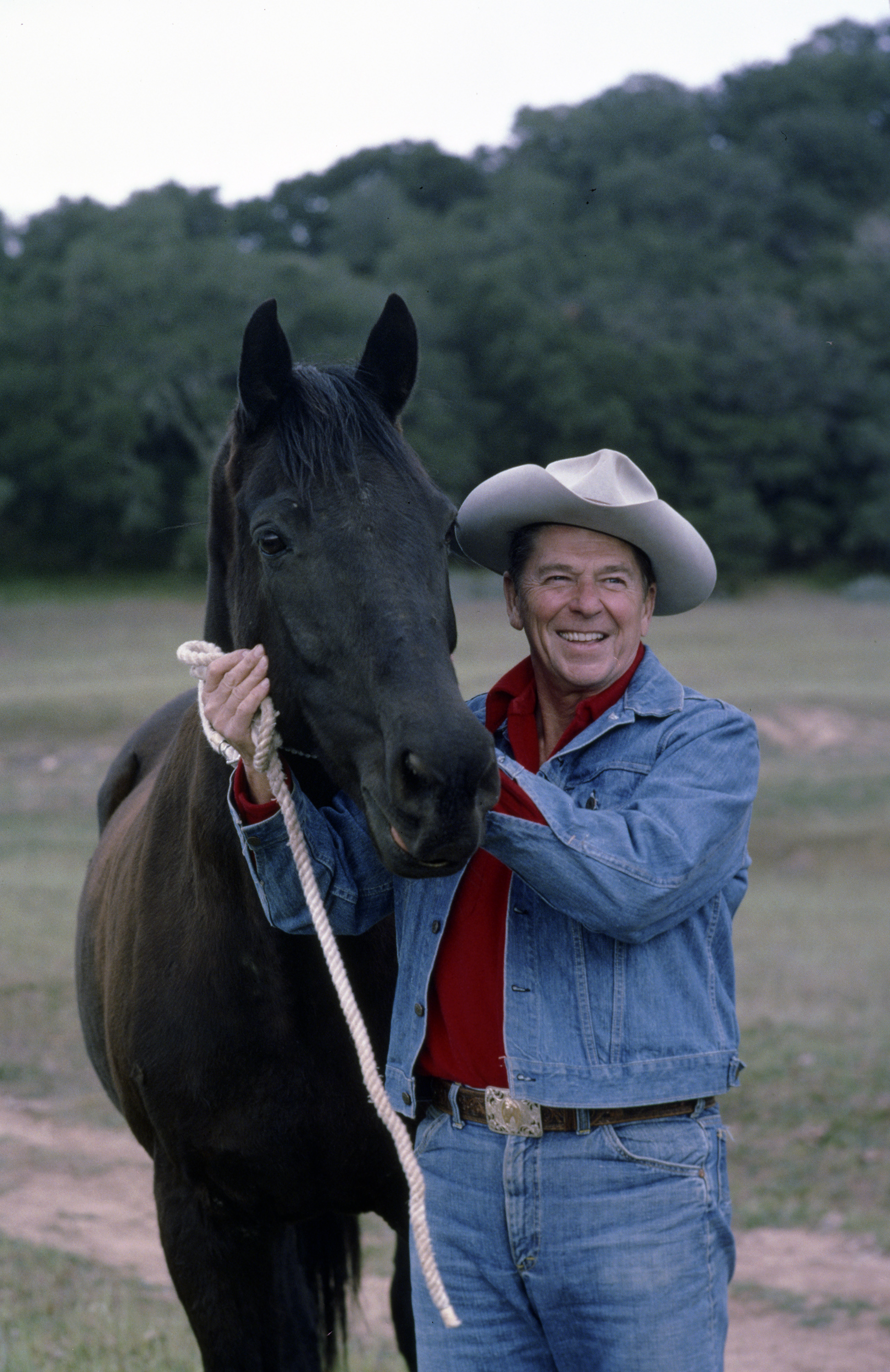
Ronald Reagan wearing a jean jacket at Rancho del Cielo in 1977

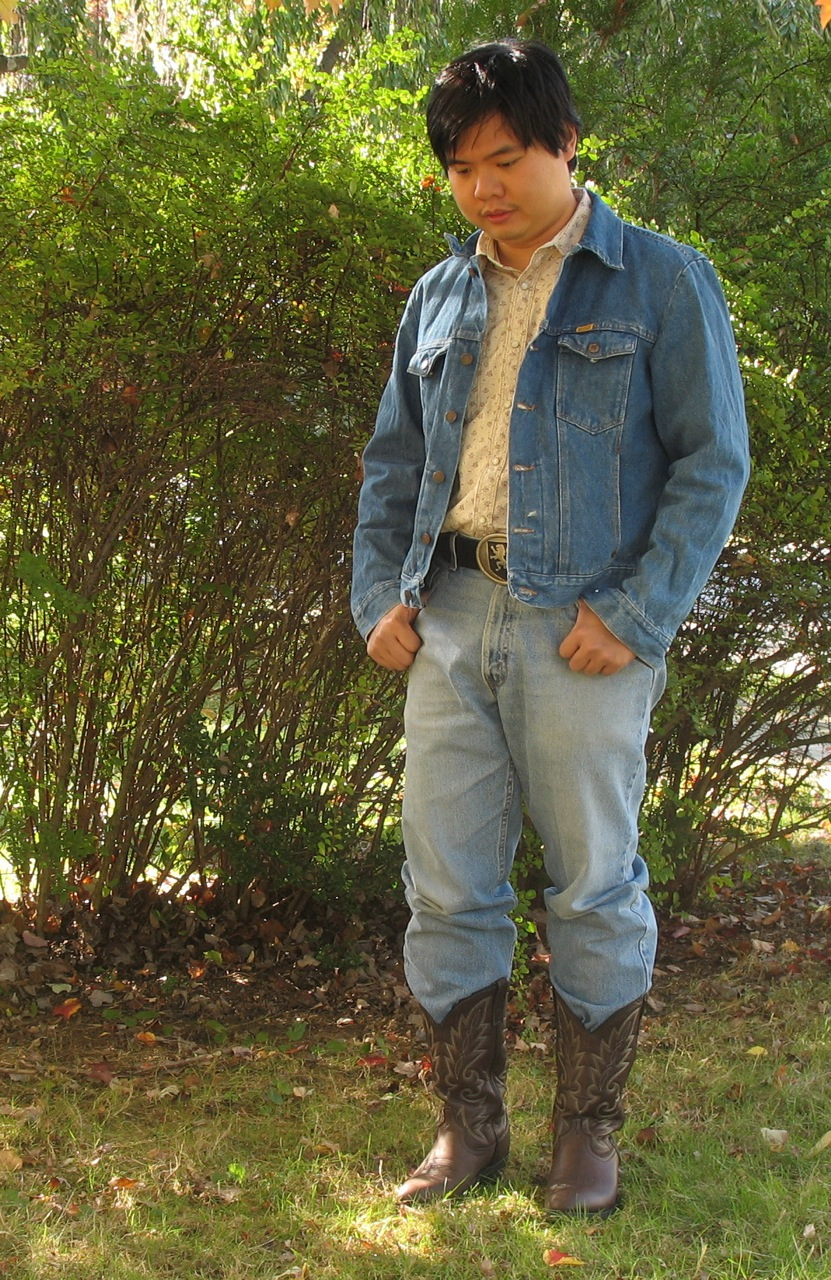
A man shown wearing a jean jacket as part of a "Canadian tuxedo" in 2007

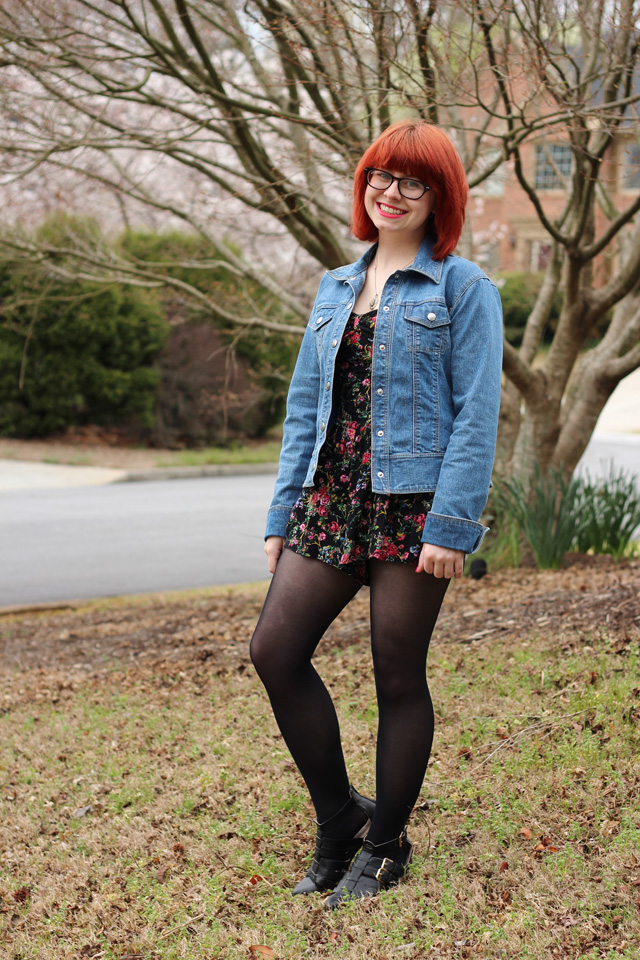
A woman wearing a jean jacket in 2015

== See also ==
- Blazer
- Sport coat
