= Kyne (drag queen) =

Canadian drag performer

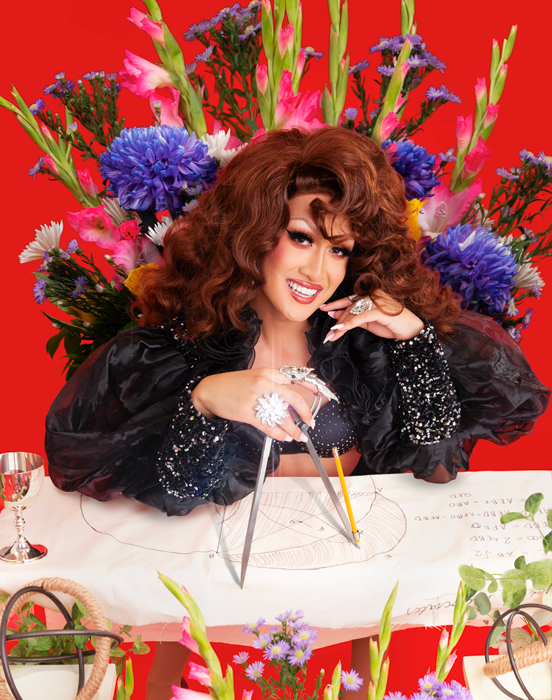
- Kyne photographed for You Magazine, 2021
- Born: Kyne Santos; April 5, 1998 (age 28); Manila, Philippines
- Education: University of Waterloo (BMath)
- Website: onlinekyne.com

Kyne Santos (born April 5, 1998), often mononymously billed as Kyne, is a Canadian drag queen best known for competing in the first season of Canada's Drag Race.

== Early life and education ==
Santos was born in Manila in the Philippines. He is of Filipino descent. He moved to Kitchener, Ontario, Canada with his parents when he was 5. In 2021, he graduated from the University of Waterloo with a Bachelor of Mathematics, majoring in Mathematical Finance.

Santos began a Master of Science in Applied Mathematics at Toronto Metropolitan University in fall 2025.

== Career ==
Prior to competing in Canada's Drag Race, Kyne had a following on YouTube for drag enthusiasts with a series of tutorials on sewing and wig styling.

Kyne uses she/her pronouns when in drag, and he/him pronouns not in drag.

Although Kyne was eliminated from Canada's Drag Race in the second episode, and got the "villain edit" because his self-confidence was perceived by some viewers as lapsing into cockiness, he subsequently became a popular figure on social media, attracting over 800,000 followers on TikTok with a popular series of math tutorials presented in drag. The math videos have included straightforward presentations on general mathematical concepts such as pi and googol, math riddles and memes, and in-depth analysis of the use of mathematics in the news, such as demonstrating the numerical flaws in bad reporting on issues such as the COVID-19 pandemic and race-based crime statistics.

Santos has described his math tutorials as inspired by a desire to present math in a fun and entertaining way, and by a desire to break down barriers, including countering common stereotypes that LGBTQ people cannot succeed in maths and sciences, and presenting a counterexample to the widespread belief that people can be analytical or creative but not both.

In January 2021, Santos also shared his coming out story in a new video for the ongoing It Gets Better Project.

In 2023, Kyne was named as a part of the year's Forbes 30 Under 30 Local: Toronto list.
