= Bailey Nelson =

Australian multinational optical retail chain

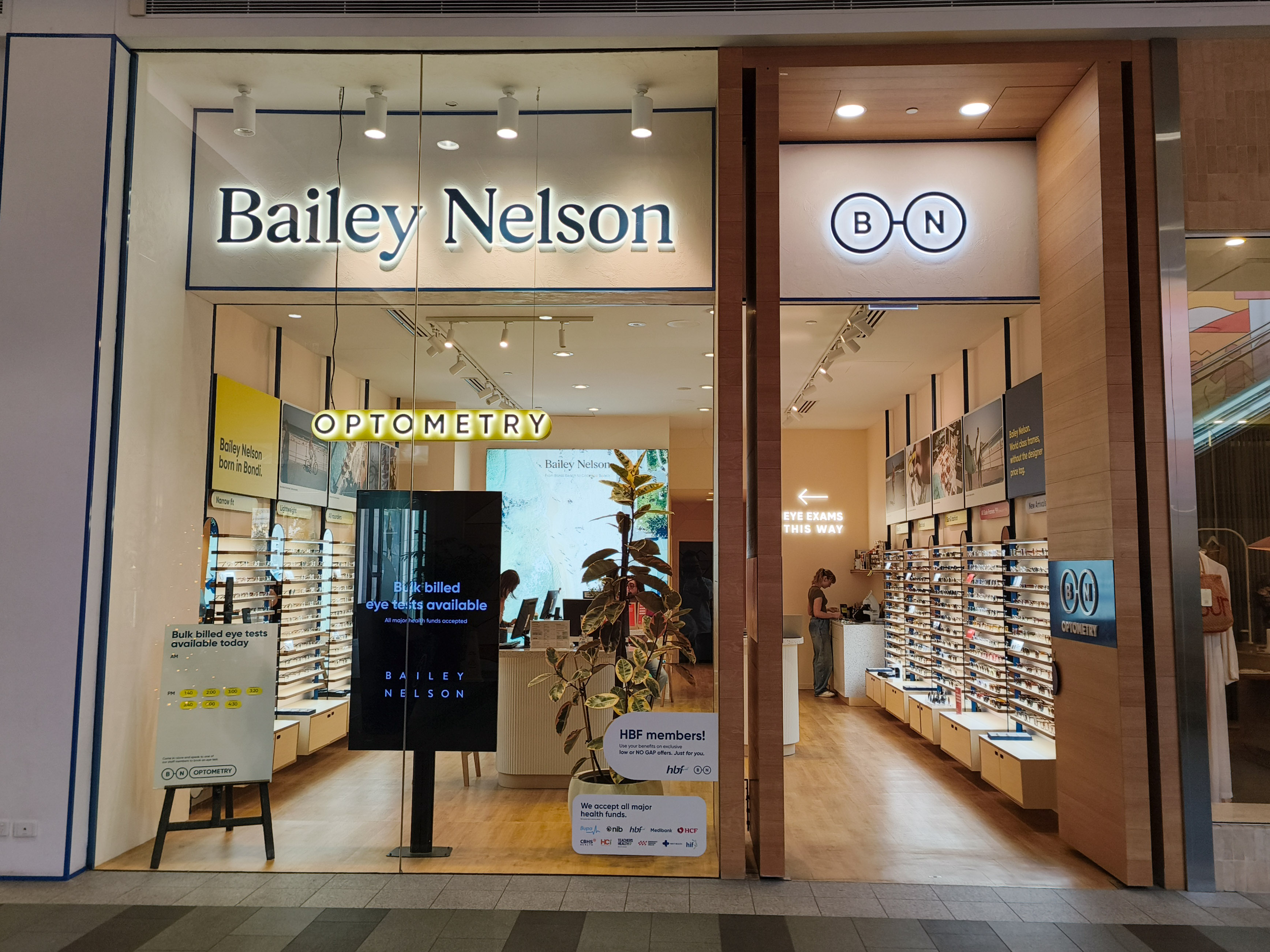
- Bailey Nelson in Claremont Quarter
- Industry: Ophthalmic and dispensing opticians
- Founded: 2012; 14 years ago in Sydney
- Founder: Nick Perry, Peter Winkle
- Headquarters: Sydney, Australia
- Number of locations: 100
- Area served: Australia, Canada, New Zealand, United States
- Website: baileynelson.com

Bailey Nelson is an Australian optical retail chain operating in Australia, New Zealand, and Canada.

== History ==
Nick Perry and Peter Winkle founded the company in Sydney, New South Wales in 2012.

Bailey Nelson entered the Canadian market in 2014, closed their Canadian stores 2017 at the end of a licensing agreement, then re-entered the Canadian market, operating 15 stores there in 2019.

In 2015, the company opened up a store in Wellington, New Zealand.
