= Ilona Verley =

Canadian drag performer

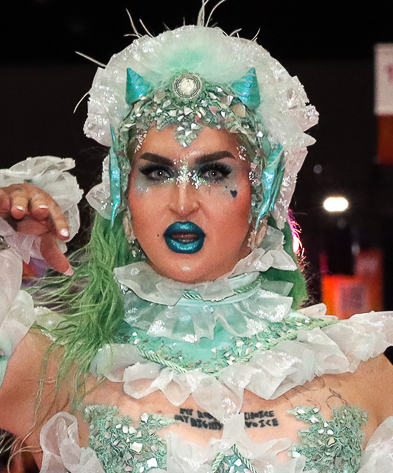
- Ilona Verley at RuPaul's DragCon LA, 2024
- Born: 1994 or 1995 (age 30–31); Nanaimo, British Columbia, Canada
- Citizenship: Canada, United States
- Occupation: Drag queen
- Television: Canada's Drag Race
- Website: ilonaverley.com

Ilona Verley is a Canadian-American drag queen, best known for competing on the first season of Canada's Drag Race.

== Early life ==
Verley was born to Sandi Verley and raised in Lytton, British Columbia and Surrey, British Columbia. They attended the Blanche MacDonald Centre in Vancouver for make-up artistry.

== Career ==
Verley appeared in pop singer Mathew V's 2018 video for his single "Broken", after Mathew V attended a drag show at which Verley had performed to Mathew V's 2017 single "Tell Me Smooth".

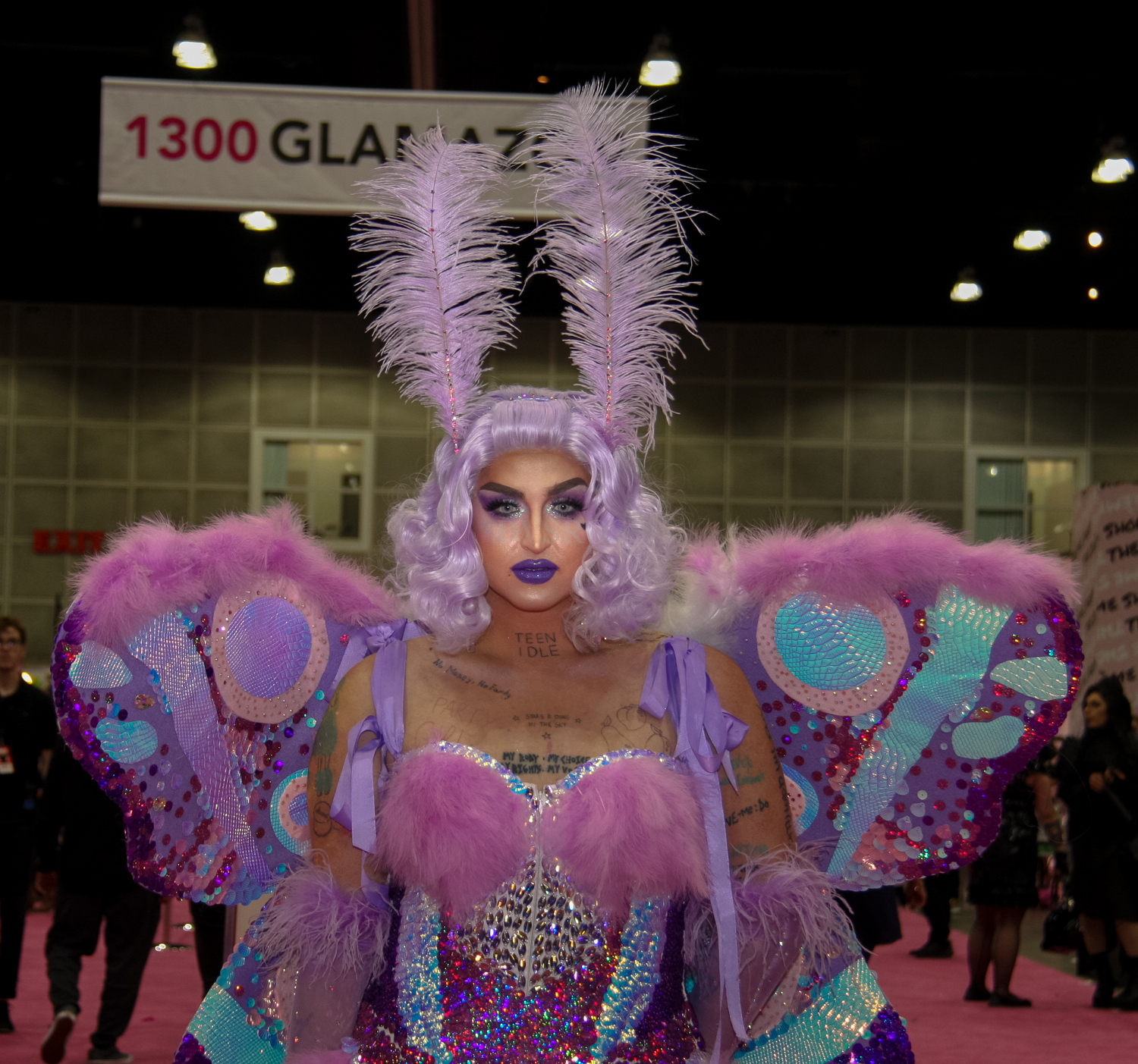
Ilona Verley at RuPaul's DragCon LA, 2019

Verley competed on the first season of Canada's Drag Race, a reality competition television series based on the American series RuPaul's Drag Race and the Canadian edition of the Drag Race franchise. Prior to their appearance on the show, they had auditioned in Los Angeles for the eleventh and twelfth seasons of American version. They became the "first Indigenous, two-spirit, and openly non-binary queen" to compete. On Canada's Drag Race, Verley placed in the bottom two on three occasions and was eliminated in the seventh episode. They also attracted positive attention for their look in the season finale, which blended a First Nations jingle dress in their signature pastel colours with red handprints, a symbol of the Missing and Murdered Indigenous Women movement.

They have also worked at a NYX Professional Makeup store.

In October 2020, Verley was announced as one of the performers at the opening gala of the 2020 imagineNATIVE Film and Media Arts Festival.

In November 2020, Verley was named to Out magazine's annual Out100 list of influential LGBTQ personalities.

== Personal life ==
Verley is Nlaka'pamux and two-spirit, and has said they identify as a "proud, Indigenous trans woman". They have described their gender identity as fluid and in flux. In November 2020 they stated: "I don't want to put my foot down too much with any label. Because who knows, in a few months from now, when I'm in a better mind-set or a better situation, how I'm going to feel". On the LGBTQ&A podcast in the same month, Verley said "I think for me right now, the best way to describe who I am right now in this moment is nonbinary and gender fluid."

They live in Vancouver as of October 2020, having returned to Canada after living in Los Angeles. In 2020, they accused NYX Professional Makeup of cultural insensitivity. They were involved in a near-fatal car accident in June 2025, leaving them with a broken nose, dislocated jaw, concussion, fractured spine and deep lacerations on the face.

== Filmography ==
=== Television ===
- Canada's Drag Race (season 1)

=== Web series ===
- Bring Back My Girls (2022)

== See also ==
- Indigenous drag performers
