= Rainbow Railroad =

Canadian LGBT relocation support agency

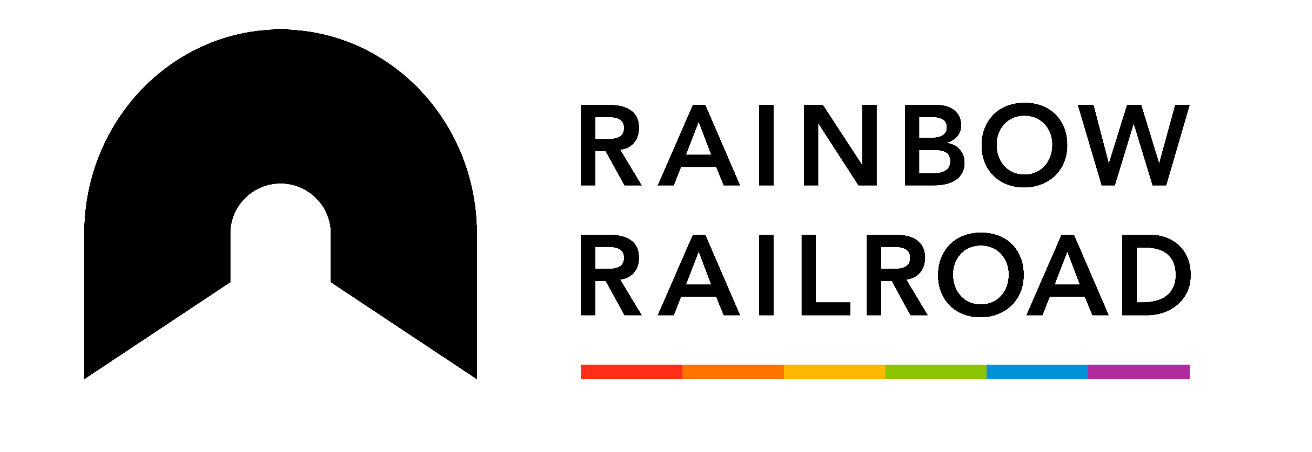
- Founded: 2006
- Type: NGO
- Tax ID no.: (Canada) 827142530RR0001; (United States) 47-4896980
- Legal status: Charitable organization
- Location(s): Toronto and New York City
- Chief Executive Officer: Ilana Landsberg-Lewis
- Website: www.rainbowrailroad.org

Rainbow Railroad is a North American charitable organization that helps lesbian, gay, bisexual, transgender, queer, and intersex (LGBTQI) individuals escape violence and persecution in their home countries. The organization was formed in 2006, with its name and concept inspired by the Underground Railroad that was used by enslaved African-Americans to escape into free states. Rainbow Railroad has assisted nearly 15,000 individuals since their founding in 2006, including over 1,500 persons supported through emergency relocation assistance. It received charitable status from the Canada Revenue Agency in 2013, and received 501(c)(3) charity organization status in 2015. The organization is based in Toronto and New York City. Human rights lawyer Ilana Landsberg-Lewis became executive director in 2026.

After the revelations about the anti-gay purges and concentration camps in Chechnya (and on a smaller scale in neighboring Ingushetia and Dagestan), Rainbow Railroad began to mobilize emergency efforts to help LGBT people get out of the region in collaboration with the Russian LGBT Network.

After the fall of Kabul to the Taliban in August 2021, Rainbow Railroad raised concerns about the situation for LGBTQ people living under the Taliban. Between August 2021 and June 2022, Rainbow Railroad helped to resettle 247 LGBTQ+ Afghans in Canada, the U.K., and Ireland.

Rainbow Railroad's main goal is to help those who identify with the LGBTQ+ community. Their mission is to save those who cannot be themselves openly in their country and bring them to a new country where they can be who they truly are. Rainbow Railroad believes that governments around the globe should enact and enforce laws and policies that protect LGBTQ+ individuals and enable them to live in freedom and safety in their own country. However, until that day arrives, the organization is focused on providing solutions for LGBTQ+ people who need immediate assistance because they are facing a serious threat to their lives and safety.

== Recognition ==
Rainbow Railroad received the 2018 Bonham Centre Award from the Mark S. Bonham Centre for Sexual Diversity Studies at the University of Toronto for its work helping LGBT refugees.

In 2019, Time magazine published a feature on Rainbow Railroad's work supporting those impacted by the anti-gay purge in Chechnya. Approximately 70 Chechen men were resettled by Rainbow Railroad during this time period.

In 2020, their work was highlighted in an episode of Canada's Drag Race. During the eighth episode of the season which aired on August 20, five gay men who had moved to Canada through the organization were given drag makeovers as the main challenge for the week. The winner of this challenge, Priyanka, won a $10,000 donation to Rainbow Railroad in her name.

In 2021, Rainbow Railroad were recognised with the Gay Times Honour for International Community Trailblazer at the fifth annual Gay Times Honours celebration in London. The award was presented by LGBTQ+ and human rights activist Blair Imani.
