= Scarlett BoBo =

Canadian drag queen

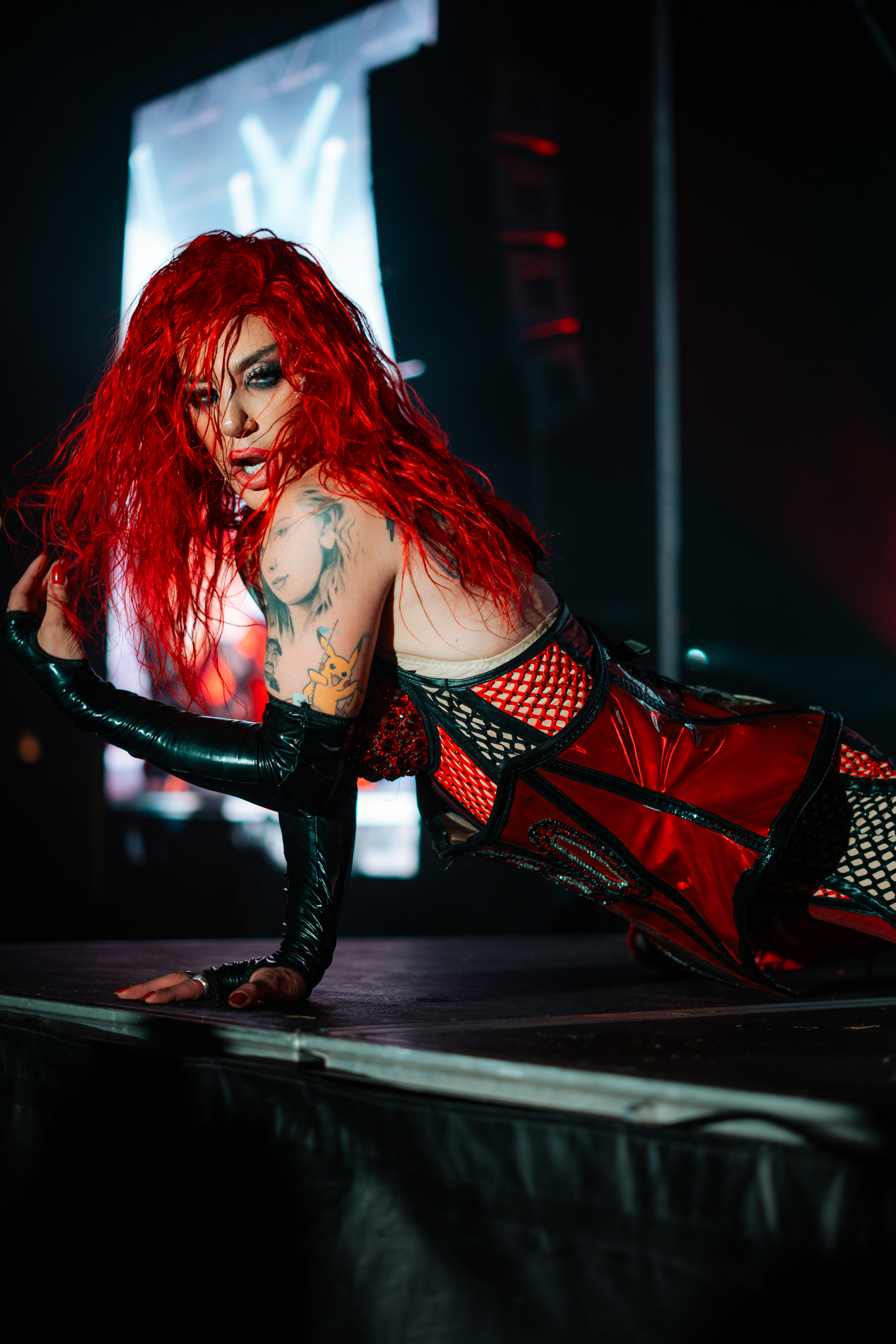
- Scarlett BoBo performing at Pride Hamilton in August 2025
- Born: Matthew Cameron; December 1, 1989 (age 35); Ottawa, Ontario, Canada
- Education: Humber College (BA)
- Occupation: Drag queen
- Years active: 2008-present

Scarlett BoBo is the stage name of Matthew Cameron (born December 1, 1989), a Canadian television personality and drag queen most noted as a finalist in the first season of the reality competition series Canada's Drag Race in 2020.

== Career ==
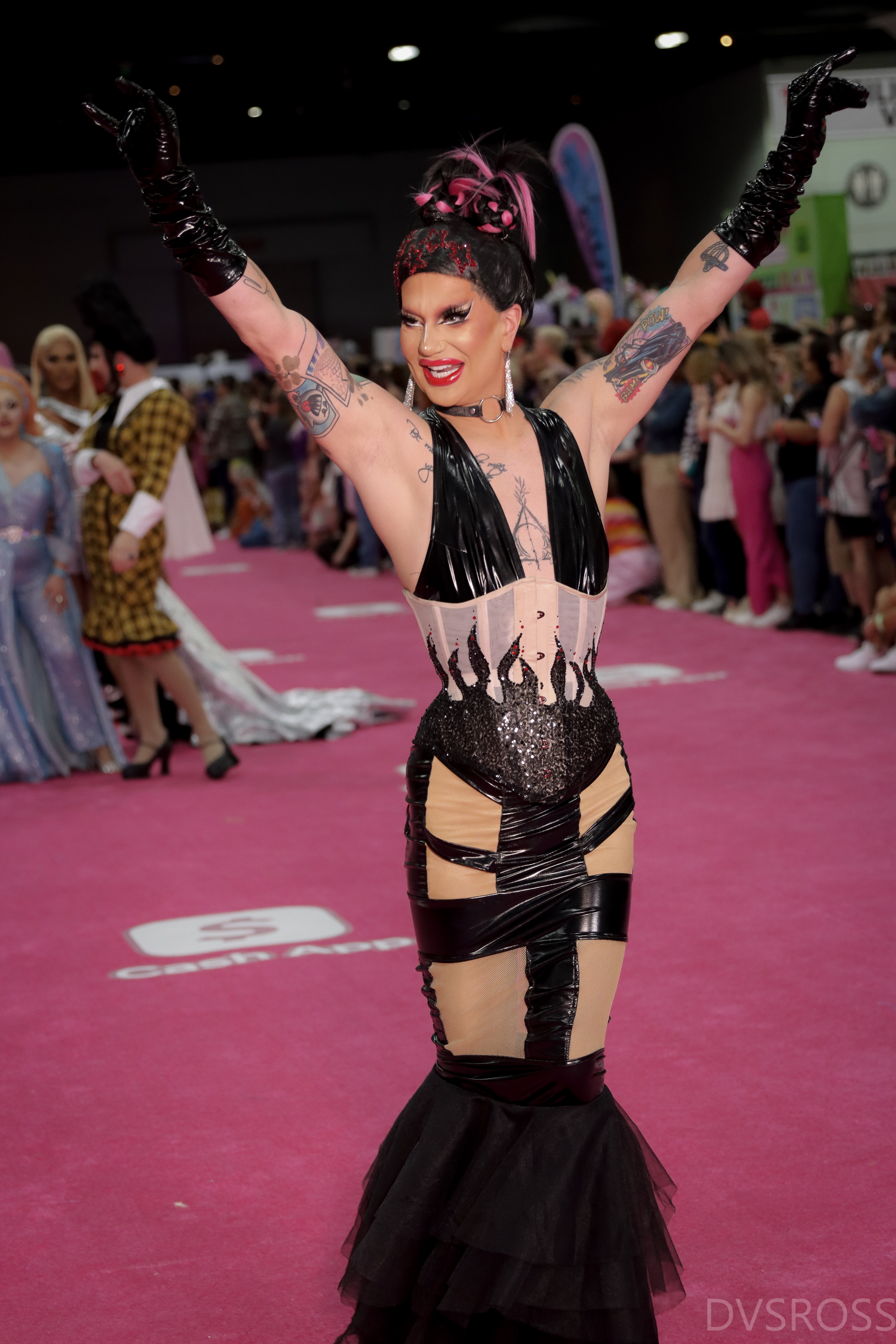
Scarlett BoBo at RuPaul's DragCon LA in 2023

Originally from Ottawa, Ontario, Scarlett BoBo began performing as a drag queen in the spring of 2008. Her drag mother is Tenora BoBo, with their surname coming from house mother Ginette BoBo. She moved to Toronto in 2009. She studied public relations at Humber College, and has also taken classes at circus school, incorporating skills like fire eating and aerial silks into her drag performances. Treating her drag as a form of activism, she has performed at a benefit for the Orlando nightclub shooting, as a host of the city's annual AIDS Walk for HIV/AIDS, and as the creator of the all-gender-inclusive Absolut Empire's Ball. She has also been an active supporter of Rainbow Railroad, regularly directing a share of the proceeds from her endeavours to the organization.

In May 2020, Scarlett Bobo was announced as a contestant in the first season of the reality competition series Canada's Drag Race. She was consistently safe or high throughout the season, and won the key ball challenge, ultimately placing as a runner-up in the finale alongside Rita Baga and behind winner Priyanka. She was only the second queen in the entire history of the Drag Race franchise, following Bianca Del Rio, to make it to the finale without ever having placed low in any challenge during the season. Following the conclusion of the season, she headlined a cross-Canada tour with the other Canada's Drag Race contestants, which was performed at drive-in venues due to the ongoing social distancing restrictions remaining in place during the COVID-19 pandemic in Canada. In October, she participated alongside Priyanka, Rita Baga and Jimbo in an online panel discussion as part of the Just for Laughs festival.

Underneath the Empire, a documentary film about Scarlett BoBo and the Absolut Empire's Ball, was screened at the TIFF Bell Lightbox in 2019 before having its television premiere on OutTV in April 2021.

=== Music ===
In 2014, she released the single "Still Fucking Going", a collaboration with her Toronto drag colleague Allysin Chaynes. She followed up with the album #BoBosexuality: The ReRelease in 2015 which included Werrrk.com's Drag Song of The Year for 2015, Break My Heart, and later with the singles "Drop the Money" and "Qu'est-ce Que Fuck".

In October 2020, she released the new single "C.E.O."

In 2022, she joined the music label So Fierce Music.

== Personal life ==
Matthew Cameron became engaged to Pete Maragos, a former political assistant to Ontario MPP Han Dong, in 2018.

== Filmography ==
Year	Title	Role	Notes
2020	Canada's Drag Race (season 1)	Herself	Runner-Up
2020	Life in a Year	Drag Queen	
2022	Bring Back My Girls	Herself	

== Discography ==
=== Studio albums ===
Title	Details
#BoBosexuality: The ReRelease	Released: June 17, 2015

=== Singles ===
Song	Year	Album	Ref
"Drop the Money" (feat. Goddexx)	2020	non-album aingle	
"Qu'est-Ce Que Fuck"	2020	non-album aingle	
"Not Sorry Aboot It" (with The Cast of Canada's Drag Race, Season 1)	2020	non-album aingle	
"U Wear It Well" – Queens of the North Ru-Mix (RuPaul featuring the Cast of Canada's Drag Race, Season 1)	2020	non-album aingle	
"C.E.O"	2020	non-album aingle	
"Daddy's Girl"	2022	non-album aingle	
"Jealousy"	2023	non-album aingle	
"Pussywitch" (Quanah Style feat. Scarlett BoBo & Sam Steele)	2024	Worship	
