= LGBTQ refugees and asylum seekers in Canada =

Refugees in Canada

In Canada, lesbian, gay, bisexual, transgender, and queer (LGBTQ) or Gender and Sexual Minority (GSM) refugees and asylum-seekers are those who make refugee claims to Canada due to their sexual orientation or gender identity.

According to the United Nations High Commissioner for Refugees (UNHCR), refugees are displaced persons who, "owing to a well-founded fear of being persecuted for reasons of race, religion, nationality, membership of a particular social group or political opinion, is outside the country of his nationality, and is unable to, or, owing to such fear, is unwilling to avail himself of the protection of that country." In order to gain refugee status in Canada, an individual must demonstrate that they are at risk of being persecuted and unable to seek protection from their home country. These claims can be made once the individual resides in Canada on a visa or prior to their arrival.

Much of the research on this population tends to be qualitative in character and is carried out with asylum seekers who already reside in Canada.

== History of LGBT and GSM refugees in Canada ==
Throughout the 20th century, homosexuality was considered by some to be deviant behaviour and participants were considered a "‘bad’ citizen." It was a criminalized lifestyle in North American discourses of American nationalism and citizenship. In 1991, Canada became one of the first Western nations to grant refugee status due to persecution based on sexual orientation. In 1993, during Canada (A.G.) v. Ward, the parameters of "belonging to a specific social group" were defined to explicitly accept LGBT/GSM refugees. By 1995, Canada offered adjudicator training regarding sexual minorities in different countries.

While media attention for the LGBTQ/GSM refugee has increased, quantifying the numbers of incoming LGBTQ/GSM refugee cases is difficult due to access to the Immigration and Refugee Board of Canada (IRB) statistics and changing standards of measurement. In 2004, The Globe and Mail reported that between 2001 and 2004, almost 2,500 GSM/LGBTQ asylum seekers made claims based on sexual or gender orientation. These claims included 75 different countries. According to Sean Rehagg in 2004, 1,358 LGBTQ/GSM claims were adjudicated, or decided in 2004. Statistics between April 2009 and June 2011 show that "561 refugee claims based on sexual orientation were finalized before the Refugee Protection Division of the Immigration and Refugee Board of Canada, with 58 per cent of those claims being granted refugee protection."

== LGBT and GSM experience in Canada as a refugee or asylum seeker ==
=== Process of applying for refugee status ===
The 1951 Convention Relating to the Status of Refugees (a.k.a. the 1951 Refugee Convention) is the United Nations treaty that defines who is a refugee, setting out the rights and guidelines for those who are granted refugee status and the responsibilities of the nation that grants it. The 1967 Protocol Relating to the Status of Refugees is the following treaty that removes the temporal and geographical restrictions of the 1951 Refugee Convention. Canada is party to both treaties. To apply for refugee status, the asylum seeker must first establish a well-founded fear of persecution and be unable to obtain protection from their country of nationality. The persecution must be due to reasons of race, religion, nationality, membership of a particular social group or political opinion. Persecution, according to LaVolette (2014), is defined as "harm feared [to] be serious and that it be inflicted in a persistent, repetitive or systematic way."

David Murray explains that documentation is the "foundation of a refugee claim." Documents are generated, reviewed, and assessed by members of the IRB to determine if the asylum seeker meets the criteria of "refugee" outlined in the 1951 Convention, the 1967 Protocol, and the Canadian Government's policy. A refugee claim can be made at a port of entry or at an inland office.

The first step in applying for refugee status is the "Basis of Claim Form" that explains why the refugee is applying for asylum and creates the foundation of the refugee case file. Once the case has been started, the refugee applicant is expected to supply RPD documents evidencing who they are (including their name and date of birth), and documents that may support their claim for sanctuary, including proof of membership, medical reports, visas, etc. If the documentation is in a language other than English or French, the applicant must have them translated into either English or French.

Once all the documentation is filed, the next step the applicant undergoes is the hearing, where a member of the RPD will decide whether or not the case meets the standard for refugee. The applicant may have representation at the hearing. If the applicant chooses to have counsel, they are responsible for the fee. The refugee applicant is not required to have counsel. If the applicant does not speak English or French, the RPD will provide an interpreter at no cost.

After the hearing, the claim will be accepted or rejected. For rejections, most of the time applicants can appeal the Refugee Appeal Division or file for a leave and for judicial review with the Federal Court. The refugee cannot appeal if they meet specific criteria i.e. if they are designated foreign national, or the "RPD’s decision says that the claim has no credible basis or is manifestly unfounded."

=== Pre-migration experience ===
Research regarding the pre-migration experience is limited. In a study done by Edwards J. Alessi, Sarilee Kahn, and Der Horn Van in 2017, discovered 4 themes of coping strategies during the pre-migration experience narrative: "‘living on the edge," adopting concealment strategies, routine victimization, and protectors as perpetrators." The authors determined these themes through the study of 26 pre-migration narrative interviews. They argue that homophobia and transphobia can be so entrenched in societal structures that individuals are unable to seek help when facing violence or threats from their local law enforcement. This study also found that refugees’ pre-migration narratives tended to have similar experiences. Refugees often described their protectors as perpetrators, and applicants underwent routine victimization. To deal with the victimization experiences, refugees develop similar strategies across multiple nationalities and cultures.

=== The refugee narrative and identity ===
The refugee process takes a toll on refugee identity and relations. The refugee process enforces a refugee narrative upon the refugee. The process of gaining refugee status in Canada requires that the refugee prove their sexual orientation in accordance with the expectation on how an LGBTQ and GSM refugee should behave in the Western world. These social and political pressures on GSM and LGBTQ refugees leads to the construction of identity that is congruent with the Western coming out narrative, which emphasize a chronological and binary recognition of one's own sexual identity.

Current research indicates a homonationalistic stance of the Canadian government towards LGBTQ and sexual minority refugees and asylum seekers. Homonationalism refers to Jasbir Paur's 2007 concept of "a privileged relationship between post-9/11 American nationalism and a particular raced, classed, and gendered formation of gay identity in opposition to the threat of racialized others." This has led to criticism that the Canadian society and government have a specific idea on what it is to be "gay". Researchers, such as David A. B. Murray, argue that this homonationalistic stance lends itself to refugees being required to adopt a culturally recognizable performance in order to obtain refugee status. Megan Gaucher and Alexa DeGagne argue the narrative that the Canadian government supports places Canada in the role of protector and refugees’ home nation in the role of uncivilized country. This can cause stress to the refugee because it encourages them to embrace Canada as the saviour from the uncivilized home nation. Researchers argue that casting Canada as a protector leads to the idea that the refugee should be grateful, and happy to be in Canada. Expecting the refugee to accept the home nation's uncivilized role can negatively impact refugees’ psychological health as well as inhibit the reports of the structural violence refugees encounter during the determination process in order to fit into the role of a grateful refugee.

Current research also indicates a need for a more flexible understanding of sexual narratives and sexual minority groups. The research further suggests that the understanding of GSM and LGBTQ refugee experience still comes from a binary and linear understanding of how to be GSM and LGBTQ that has encompassed the Western idea of what it means to be "gay" in Canada. The Western understanding of the GSM and LGBTQ experience has been focused on a chronological recognition where the individual discovers that they are LGBTQ and the performance of that identity then remains constant in a chronological fashion. David A. B. Murray argues that this is often exhibited through chronological questions. The progress of recognizing one's ideas begins in childhood and background, then sexual experiences and desires during adolescence and adulthood prior to their migration. This LGBTQ identity favours the binary approach of being male or female, and attracted to males or females. The refugee narrative expected by the government of the refugee experience is taught and absorbed to the incoming refugees to increase their chances of success in navigating the refugee process. Many applicants join social groups in efforts to increase their authenticity of their identity during the application process to visibly demonstrate their sexual identity and to help deal with the stress of the process. The process for the refugee application and gaining refugee status is the same for all LGBTQ refugees and through sharing their experiences it can increase their chances for success. This can cause suspicion among other applicants as their stories can sound similar. The Western narrative emphasizes the linear process of discovering the refugee's sexual identity, where their background and childhood experiences leads to the recognition during adolescence and adulthood. It is expected by officials that friends and family would be familiar with the individual's sexual orientation—during the process, friends and family can be contacted to authenticate their preferences. In some cases, when friends and family are not familiar with the individual's orientation, it can increase the risk of the refugee request being denied.

=== Applying as a bisexual refugee or asylum seeker ===
According to researchers like Sean Rehagg, the homonationalistic understanding of the LGBTQ/GSM experience seems to be binary and unchangeable in nature. For a bisexual refugee, there is a greater risk of being turned down than those who identify as gay, lesbian or transgender. Rehagg argues that the bisexual refugee experience can be looked at in two ways: They are invisible in their home state and they have low success rates. According to Rehagg, the threat of bisexuality to both the heterosexual and homosexual binary understanding of sexuality can lead to the bisexual refugee receiving less attention than the rest of the LGBTQ community, as it threatens the stance of having a single preference supported by both the homosexual and heterosexual beliefs. The support of binary sexual preference and identification is attributed to the cis-normative and hetero-normative approaches to sexuality that are entrenched in the social system in Canada. Despite the first publicly recorded bisexual refugee case in Canada in 2000, the number of bisexual refugees has decreased over the last twenty years. In a recent study done by Rehagg, no bisexual refugee was granted refugee status between 2001 and 2004. Furthermore, out of the 115 publicly published LGBTQ/GSM applicants, only 11 identified as bisexual. Rehagg also found that bisexual applicants made up 7% of the claims, and the success rate of bisexual applicants was 25%. LGBTQ/GSM applicants that identified other than bisexual had a 49% success rate, and the average success rate was found to be 46%.
