= Jeffrey Bowyer-Chapman =

Canadian actor and model (born 1984)

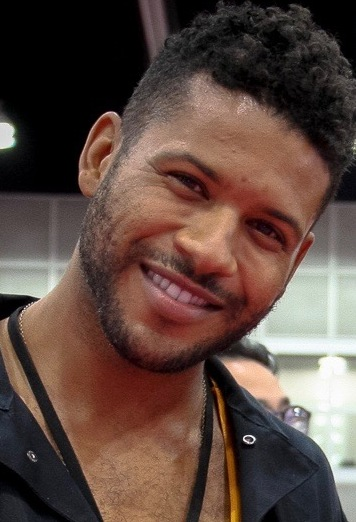
- Bowyer-Chapman in 2019
- Born: October 21, 1984 (age 42); Edmonton, Alberta, Canada
- Occupations: Actor; voice artist; model; television personality
- Years active: 2003–present
- Partner: Andrew Fitzsimons
- Relatives: Cleyon Laing (brother)

Jeffrey Bowyer-Chapman (born October 21, 1984) is a Canadian actor, model, and television personality. He is known for appearances in films and television, most notably as Jay in the Lifetime dark comedy-drama series Unreal (2015–2018) and as one of the main judges on the first season of Canada's Drag Race (2020).

== Early life ==
Bowyer-Chapman, whose last name is a hyphenate of his adoptive parents' last names, was born in 1984 in Edmonton, Alberta, and adopted when he was 12 days old. His biological younger brother is Cleyon Laing, defensive end for the Toronto Argonauts. His biological father is Jamaican.

Bowyer-Chapman was raised, with one sister, in Rimbey, Alberta, a small "predominantly Caucasian" town of less than 2000 people, which he says people in the area refer to as "the Texas of the north." According to Bowyer-Chapman, the region was "very much, like, oil and gas and farming and ranching" and growing up there as a biracial gay man was akin to "a sick social experiment." He was, in his own words, "exposed to a lot at a very young age and expected to be very adult in very bizarre situations."

Bowyer-Chapman lived in Rimbey until his teenage years, at which point he moved to Vancouver, then began traveling as a model at age 15 throughout Europe, South Africa, and all across North America. He later moved to Vancouver again at age 21, which was when he began to take his acting career more seriously. He acted in his first movie, then moved to New York, living there for seven years before moving to Los Angeles in September 2016.

== Career ==
Bowyer-Chapman began his modeling career at age 15 after friends and school teachers nudged him toward that career path. His first test shoot was in Calgary. He began making decent money at the job around age 18 or 19, shooting advertorials, catalogs, and campaigns for brands such as Levi's and American Apparel. He is represented by Wilhelmina Models.

Alongside modeling, Bowyer-Chapman also began an acting career, making his screen debut in the gay-themed film Shock to the System (2006). He was named one of "Five of the Best..." in Out magazine's 2007 feature article "Canada's Coolest" and was listed in Mwinda magazine's 2009 special issue "The 10 Most Beautiful Africans In Entertainment". He has modeled in many countries including the United States, Canada, South Africa, and Europe. He has also modeled in international campaigns for American Apparel and Levi's.

He went on to appear in the television series Noah's Arc and The L Word, and well as the film The Break-Up Artist (2009). From 2009 to 2011, Bowyer-Chapman had a recurring role in the Syfy series Stargate Universe.

In 2012, he starred alongside Jussie Smollett in Patrik-Ian Polk's LGBT-themed romantic comedy-drama film The Skinny. In 2015, he began starring alongside Constance Zimmer and Shiri Appleby in the critically acclaimed Lifetime dark comedy-drama series Unreal, playing the role of Jay, a gay reality television producer. In 2016, Bowyer-Chapman appeared in the comedy film Dirty Grandpa. In 2018, Bowyer-Chapman joined the cast of the FX anthology series American Horror Story for its eighth season, subtitled Apocalypse.

In September 2019, he was announced as one of the three permanent judges on the first season of Canada's Drag Race, the Canadian version of RuPaul's Drag Race. As the show aired, Bowyer-Chapman was negatively received by many Drag Race fans and was subjected to racist comments from some fans online. At the suggestion of RuPaul, he deleted his Twitter account. He also felt uncomfortable during the production, commenting about a producer who encouraged him to be "the sassy one". In March 2021, it was announced that he would not be returning for the second season. He has since returned as a guest judge on RuPaul's Drag Race All Stars and its Untucked companion.

In May 2021, Bowyer-Chapman and his Canada's Drag Race co-judges Brooke Lynn Hytes and Stacey McKenzie won the Canadian Screen Award for Best Host or Presenter in a Factual or Reality/Competition Series at the 9th Canadian Screen Awards.

== Personal life ==
In 2016, Bowyer-Chapman came out publicly as gay.

== Filmography ==
=== Film ===
Year	Title	Role	Notes
2006	Shock to the System	Levon	
2007	I Know What I Saw	Marco	Television film
2007	The Brown Bag Mystery	Justin	Short film
2008	On the Bus	Jeremy	Short film
2009	Encounter with Danger	Mr. Gaitan	Television film
2009	The Break-Up Artist	Steven	
2010	Another Brief Moment	Trevor	Short film
2010	Dear Mr. Gacy	Male hustler	
2012	The Skinny	Joey	
2012	Grave Encounters 2	Vlogger	
2013	Lucille's Ball	Walter	
2015	Stray	Alex	Short film
2016	Dirty Grandpa	Bradley	
2016	Tao of Surfing	Val Stone	
2017	Love by the 10th Date	Freddy Mitchell	Television film
2019	Falling Inn Love	Dean	
2019	Spiral	Malik	

=== Television ===
Year	Title	Role	Notes
2006	Stargate SG-1	Server	Episode: "Memento Mori"
2006	Noah's Arc	Brandy's Assistant	Episode: "Under Pressure"
2007	The Virgin of Akron, Ohio	Brick	Unsold pilot
2007	The L Word	Cowboy	Episode: "Livin' La Vida Loca"
2009–2011	Stargate Universe	Pvt. Darren Becker	Recurring role, 19 episodes
2009–2012	Iron Man: Armored Adventures	Black Panther	Voice, 4 episodes
2011	Fairly Legal	Server	Episode: "Coming Home"
2011	Warehouse 13	Jalapeño	Episode: "Trials"
2013	Hatfields & McCoys	Owen Rodney	Unsold pilot
2015–2018	UnREAL	Jay	Series regular
2017	RuPaul's Drag Race	Guest judge	Episode: Season 9, Good Morning Bitches, episode 4
2018	RuPaul's Drag Race All Stars	Guest judge	Episode: Season 3, The B*tchelor, episode 3
2018	American Horror Story: Apocalypse	Andre Stevens	3 episodes
2020	Canada's Drag Race	Judge	Season 1
2020	RuPaul's Drag Race All Stars	Guest judge	Episode: Season 5, Snatch Game of Love, episode 5
2021	RuPaul's Drag Race	Special guest	Episode: Season 13, RuPaulmark Channel, episode 4
2021–2023	Doogie Kameāloha, M.D.	Charles Zeller	Main Role
2022	RuPaul's Drag Race All Stars	Guest judge	Episode: Season 7, Fairytale Justice, episode 4
2022	RuPaul's Drag Race All Stars: Untucked	Guest judge	Episode: Season 7, Fairytale Justice, episode 4

=== Music videos ===
Year	Title	Artist	Director
2012	"Curiosity"	Carly Rae Jepsen	Colin Minihan
2019	"Star Maps"	Aly & AJ	Amanda Crew
