= Rita Baga =

Canadian drag queen (born 1987)

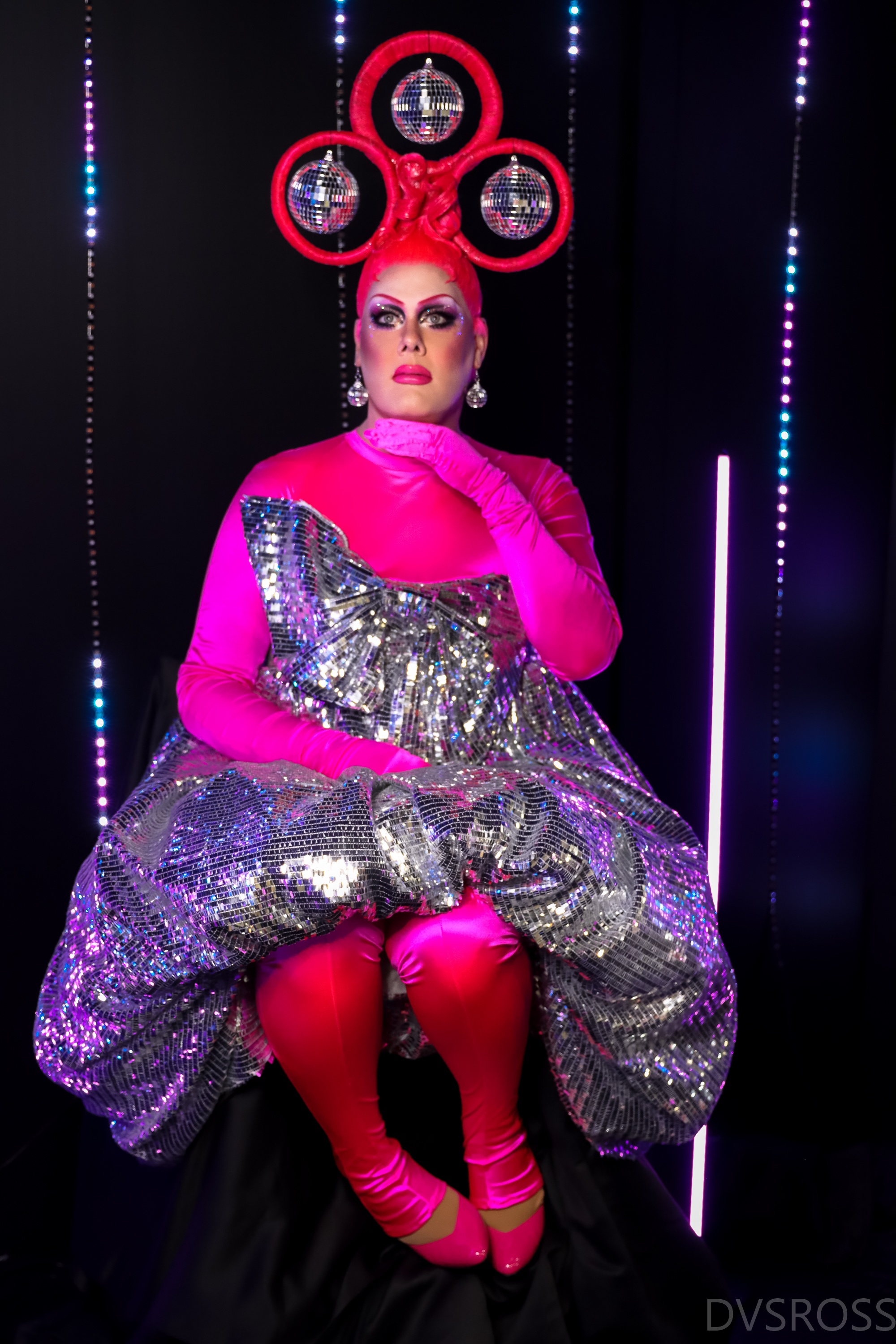
- Rita Baga at RuPaul's DragCon LA, 2023
- Born: Jean-François Guevremont; May 27, 1987 (age 39); Boucherville, Quebec, Canada
- Education: University of Quebec, Montreal (MA)
- Occupations: Drag queen, singer, event programmer
- Years active: 2007–present
- Television: Canada's Drag Race (season 1); Canada's Drag Race: Canada vs. the World (season 1); Drag Race Belgique
- Website: ritabaga.ca

Jean-François Guevremont (born May 27, 1987), known professionally as Rita Baga, is a Canadian drag queen and television personality from Montreal, Quebec.

She is best known as a top three finalist in the first season of Canada's Drag Race.

In 2022, it was announced that Rita Baga would be the main host of Drag Race Belgique.

In 2022, she also returned to compete in the first season of Canada's Drag Race: Canada vs. the World. She placed in the top four.

In addition to performing as Rita Baga, Guevremont previously worked as the director of programming for Fierté Montréal (Montreal Pride) for many years.

== Education ==
Guevremont is an alumnus of the Université du Québec à Montréal, where he studied human resources and tourist development.

== Career ==
Guevremont began his drag career in 2007, performing at Cabaret Mado for the birthday show of her friend Dream (also a drag queen). That evening, she did a medley of songs from the film Sister Act, with colleagues and fellow drag queens Marla and Célinda.

Initially performing under the name Rita d'Marde (a phonetic French word play of "Laugh, asshole!"), she changed it to Rita Baga in 2010 when she became a regular at the famous Montreal's drag establishment Cabaret Mado.

In 2013, Rita Baga appeared on La Guerre des clans, V's French-language version of Family Feud.

In 2014, Rita Baga became the permanent host of Bagalicious, the Sunday night program at Cabaret Mado. In 2016 she launched MX Fierté, a cross-Canada drag pageant held in conjunction with Fierté Montréal; in the same year, she travelled to Mumbai, India to perform at the KASHISH Mumbai International Queer Film Festival.

In 2017, Guevremont participated in Ils de jour, elles de nuit, an Ici ARTV documentary series about drag queens, alongside Barbada de Barbades, Gaby, Lady Boom Boom, Lady Pounana and Tracy Trash.

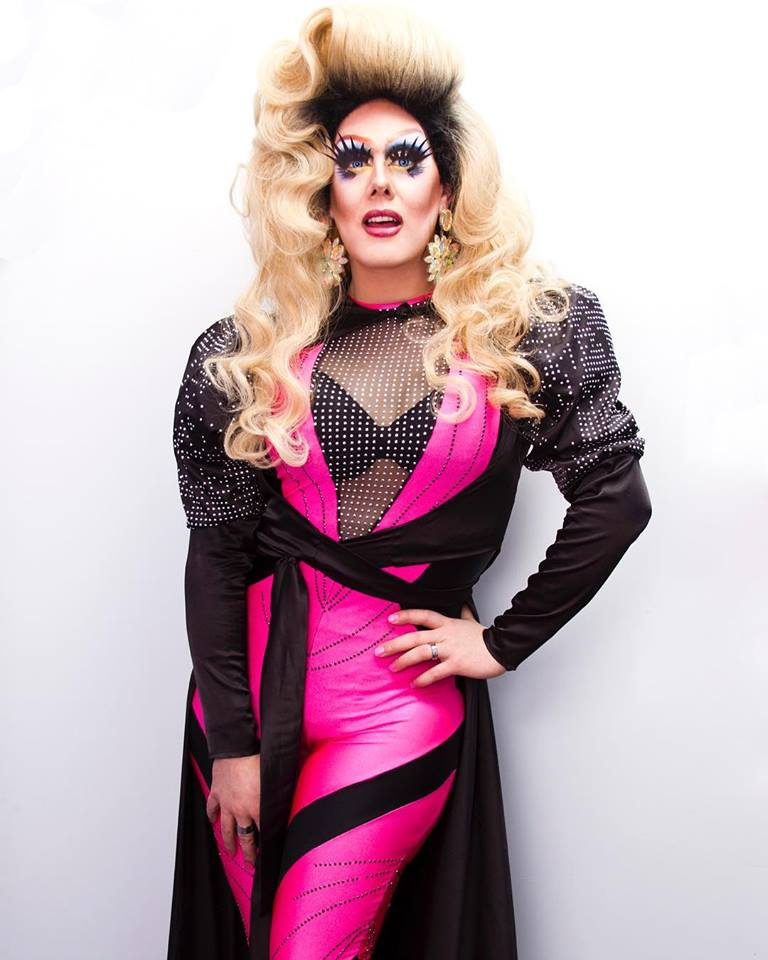
Rita Baga

The inaugural season of Canada's Drag Race filmed in late 2019, and the cast was revealed to the public in 2020 several weeks before the show's premiere on July 2. Rita Baga was one of two queens from Montreal, alongside Kiara, to appear in the season. In August 2020, with Fierté Montréal suspended due to the COVID-19 pandemic in Canada, Guevremont in his role as director of programming helped to coordinate a special online edition of the annual Drag Superstars show, which featured all of the queens from Canada's Drag Race in prerecorded video performances. While most other queens performed lipsyncs to established pop songs, Guevremont used his segment to premiere the music video for Rita Baga's own original single "Something Spiritual". Rita Baga made it to the top 3 in Canada's Drag Race, with Scarlett BoBo and Priyanka, and won the most weekly challenges over the course of the season, but ultimately lost the crown to Priyanka. She placed high, but did not win, in the Snatch Game challenge for her performance as Édith Piaf.

Following the conclusion of the Canada's Drag Race season, the cast announced a cross-Canada tour, to be performed at drive-in venues due to the ongoing social distancing restrictions remaining in place during the COVID-19 pandemic. The tour was hosted by Brooke Lynn Hytes. Alongside Priyanka, Scarlett BoBo and Jimbo, Rita Baga participated in an online panel as part of the 2020 Just for Laughs festival.

In December 2020, it was announced that Rita Baga would be part of the cast of the first season of the Quebec version of Big Brother Célébrités. She was evicted on day 29 in twelfth place. In April 2021, it was announced that Rita Baga would be one of the regular panelists, alongside Roxane Bruneau, on Qui sait chanter?, the Quebec adaptation of I Can See Your Voice. In July, Rita Baga and Jean-Thomas Jobin, who had been one of her housemates on Big Brother Célebrités, cohosted a Carte blanche gala at the 2021 Just for Laughs festival.

In September, she had a guest role appearing as herself in a fifth-season episode of Madame Lebrun, the Quebec adaptation of Mrs. Brown's Boys. In October 2021, Rita Baga launched Créature, a theatre tour blending lipsynching, live singing and comedy segments. The tour received a Félix Award nomination for Best Variety or Reinterpretation Concert at the 44th Félix Awards in 2022. In November, she was announced as the host of La Drag en moi, a makeover series based on Dragnificent! in which drag queens help ordinary people to look their best for an important event; the series premiered on Crave in August 2022.

In July 2022, she was announced as the host for the upcoming Drag Race Belgique, Belgium's Drag Race spin-off. On September 18, 2022, Rita Baga, Barbada de Barbades and Mona de Grenoble presented an award at the Prix Gémeaux ceremony, reading the nominees before bringing out Gisèle Lullaby, the third season winner of Canada's Drag Race, to announce the winner. She competed in the first season of Canada's Drag Race: Canada vs. the World in 2022, portraying Montreal drag icon Guilda in the Snatch Game episode. Rita Baga won two of the main weekly challenges during the season and made it to the finale episode of the competition, placing in the top four.

In 2023, Rita Baga was a contestant in the third season of Chanteurs masqués as Le Lion. She reached the finale, but ultimately lost to Le Caméléon (the chameleon) portrayed by Michel Courtemanche.

In 2025 she was announced as having a supporting role in the upcoming television series adaptation of Bon Cop, Bad Cop.

== Personal life ==
"Boniour! I saw a lot of things online recently about me and problematic things i've done in the past. I have make stupid and hurtful mistakes, a long time ago, that I still regret. Deeply. For those of you who did not know this before, I apologize again. I can't undo what i've done as a young, privileged and unaware white queen."

— Statement from Rita Baga on Twitter.

On November 6, 2022, Rita Baga issued an apology throughout social media due to a past performance in which she wore blackface to portray Amber Riley from Glee.

== Filmography ==
=== Television ===
Year	Title	Role	Notes
2013	La Guerre des clans	Herself	
2017	Ils de jour, elles de nuit	Herself	Documentary series
2018	Breakfast Television Montreal	Herself	Guest
2020	Canada's Drag Race	Contestant	Runner-up (Season 1)
2020-2023	La semaine des 4 Julie	Herself	Celebrity Guest, 10 episodes
2021-2023	Sucré salé	Herself	Celebrity Guest, 3 episodes
2021-2022	Le Téléjournal	Herself	Guest
2021	Sans rancune	Herself	One episode
2021	Big Brother Célébrités	Contestant	Eliminated; 12th place
2021-2022	Qui sait chanter?	Herself	Main panelist
2021	Madame Lebrun	Herself	One episode
2022	La Drag en moi	Host	Crave original series
2022	Canada's Drag Race: Canada vs. the World	Contestant	3rd/4th Place (Season 1)
2023	Drag Race Belgique	Main host	
2023	Chanteurs masqués	Contestant	3rd Place (season 3)
2026	Bon Cop, Bad Cop	Rita Baga	

=== Web series ===
Year	Title	Role	Notes	Ref
2020	Meet The Queens	Herself	Stand-alone special Canada's Drag Race Season 1	
2020	After the Sashay	Herself	Guest	
2020	ET Canada Pride	Herself	Guest with Priyanka & Scarlett BoBo	
2020	Le Podcast de Thomas Levac	Herself	Guest; Podcast	
2020	La vie est belle	Herself	Guest	
2020	Moore, Please	Herself	Guest with Scarlett BoBo	
2020	PopBuzz Meets	Herself	Guest	
2021	Sous Écoute	Herself	Guest; Episode: "#311 – Rita Baga et Charles Beauchesne"	
2021	Pivot avec Pineault	Herself	Guest	
2021	En Coulisses x ELLE Québec	Herself	Guest	
2021	Jay Du Temple discute	Herself	Guest; Podcast	
2021	Le Mouvement Québec Français Présente	Herself	Guest	
2022	Tout le monde s'haït	Herself	Guest	
2022	Encré dans la peau	Herself	Guest	
2022	Meet The Queens	Herself	Stand-alone special Canada's Drag Race: Canada vs The World	
2022	Courrier recommandé	Herself	Guest; By URBANIA	

== Discography ==
=== Albums ===
Title	Year
"Flash"	2025

=== Singles ===
==== As main artist ====
Title	Year	Album
"Fashionista"	2016	Non-album singles
"Something Spiritual	2020	Non-album singles
"C'est toi"	2024	Non-album singles
"Sunglasses at Night"	2024	Non-album singles

==== As featured artist ====
Title	Year	Album
"Not Sorry Aboot It" (with The Cast of Canada's Drag Race, Season 1)	2020	Non-album singles
"U Wear It Well" – Queens of the North Ru-Mix (RuPaul featuring the Cast of Canada's Drag Race, Season 1)	2020	Non-album singles
"Bonjour, Hi!" (Touché Version) (The cast of Canada's Drag Race: Canada vs The World)	2022	Non-album singles

== Awards and nominations ==
Year	Award-giving body	Category	Work	Results	Ref.
2022	23th Gala Les Olivier	Olivier de l’année	Herself	Nominated	
2022	2022 Premier Gala de l’ADISQ	Spectacle de L’année – Variétés/Réinteprétations	Creature	Nominated	
