= Stacey McKenzie =

Model

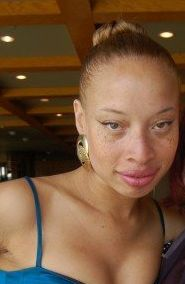
- McKenzie in 2008
- Born: March 27, 1977 (age 48); Kingston, Jamaica
- Occupations: Model; runway modelling coach; motivational speaker; television personality; actress
- Years active: 1990s-present
- Modeling information
- Height: 5 ft 10 in (1.78 m)
- Agency: Plutino Group
- Website: www.staceymckenzie.com

Stacey McKenzie (born March 27, 1977) is a Jamaican-born Canadian model, runway coach, motivational speaker, television personality, and actress. McKenzie has been a judge on the reality television shows America's Next Top Model, Canada's Next Top Model, and Canada's Drag Race.

== Career ==
Unprepared for the challenges of a modelling career, McKenzie returned to Canada to finish high school. Soon after that, she moved to Paris, France to pursue modelling further. During her first season, she modelled for top designers including Jean Paul Gaultier, Thierry Mugler and Christian Lacroix.

In February 2012, McKenzie was a panellist on Canada Reads, defending Dave Bidini's book On a Cold Road. On the first day, McKenzie controversially cast a tie-breaking vote to eliminate Prisoner of Tehran.

McKenzie was a main judge on the first season of reality television show Canada's Next Top Model in 2006.

In September 2019, McKenzie was announced as one of three permanent judges on Canada's Drag Race, the Canadian version of RuPaul's Drag Race.

In May 2021, McKenzie and her Canada's Drag Race co-judges Brooke Lynn Hytes and Jeffrey Bowyer-Chapman won the Canadian Screen Award for Best Host or Presenter in a Factual or Reality/Competition Series at the 9th Canadian Screen Awards.

== Filmography ==
McKenzie made her acting debut in the 1996 film Shadow Play (Portraits chinois), but gained more attention in the 1997 film, The Fifth Element, as a VIP Stewardess.

=== Television ===
| Year | Title | Role | Notes |
|---|---|---|---|
| 2006–07 | Canada's Next Top Model | Herself | Judge (Season 1), Guest runway coach (Season 2) |
| 2006, 2017–18 | America's Next Top Model | Herself | Guest (Season 7, 1 episode), Guest runway coach (Season 23, 4 episodes), Runway coach (Season 24, 6 episodes) |
| 2020 | Canada's Drag Race | Herself | Main judge (Season 1) |
| 2020 | "Utopia Falls" | Petra 9 | |

== Link ==
https://www.imdb.com/name/nm0571613/?ref_=tt_cl_t_7
