= Universal Standard =

American size-inclusive clothing brand

- Type: Private
- Industry: Fashion, Retail
- Founded: 2015
- Founders: Alexandra Waldman; Polina Veksler
- Headquarters: New York City, United States
- Key people: Polina Veksler (CEO)
- Products: Apparel
- Website: www.universalstandard.com

Universal Standard (founded in 2015) is an American clothing retailer and fashion brand. It produces apparel ranging from size 00 to 40.

== History ==
Universal Standard was established in 2015 by Polina Veksler and the late Alexandra Waldman. The company was founded after Waldman and Veksler identified the limited availability of well-made women’s clothing in larger sizes. Before co-founding Universal Standard, Waldman worked as a journalist and marketing executive. She died of cancer on September 8, 2023.

In 2018, Universal Standard raised a $7 million Series A funding round from investors including Imaginary Ventures (Massenet's fund), Gwyneth Paltrow, Matches Fashion founders Tom and Ruth Chapman, and others.

The company initially began as an online-only retailer. It later expanded into physical retail and operated a store in SoHo. In 2019, it opened by-appointment showrooms in New York, Chicago, Seattle, Houston, and Portland, which were later closed during the COVID-19 pandemic. The same year, the company was recognized as "Trailblazer of the Year" by Retail Dive for its approach to size inclusivity in fashion. In 2023, Universal Standard acquired Henning, a plus-size luxury workwear brand founded by Lauren Chan.

== Operations and approach ==
Universal Standard designs and sells women’s clothing, including jeans, basics, dresses, activewear and outerwear. The company offers a range of sizes and incorporates customer feedback and data analysis into its product development. Its fitting process, which it refers to as "micrograding", involves adjusting garments across individual sizes rather than grading from a single sample size.

The company also operates Fit Liberty, an exchange program that allows customers to exchange eligible items for a different size within a specified period.

In 2025, it began selling through 20 Nordstrom stores and Nordstrom’s website, and also had wholesale arrangements with Anthropologie, Macy’s, and Nuuly. Previously, Universal Standard collaborated with Danielle Brooks and brands such as Adidas, J.Crew, Goop, and Rodarte.
