= The Traitors Canada season 1 =

Canadian television series season

The Traitors Canada
- Season 1
- Promotional poster
- Presented by: Karine Vanasse
- No. of contestants: 20
- Winner: Mike D'Urzo
- Runner-up: Gurleen Maan
- Location: The Manoir Rouville-Campbell, Montérégie région
- No. of episodes: 10

Release
- Original network: CTV
- Original release: October 2 – December 4, 2023

Season chronology
- Next → Season 2

The first season of the Canadian television series The Traitors Canada premiered on CTV on October 2, 2023, with episodes being released weekly. The season was won by Mike D'Urzo, as a traitor, with Gurleen Maan, placing as runner-up, as a faithful.

== Production ==
The season is produced similar to its American counterpart. However, the show is filmed at an historic manor, The Manoir Rouville-Campbell in Mont-Saint-Hilaire in the Montérégie région.

The first season of The Traitors Canada featured ten former reality television participants and ten members of the general public.

== Format ==
The contestants arrived at the castle and are referred to as the "Faithful." Among them are the "Traitors," a group of contestants secretly selected by the host, Karine Vanasse. Each night, the Traitors would decide who to "murder," and that same contestant would leave the game. After the end of each day, where the contestants participated in various challenges to add money to the prize fund, they would participate in the Round Table, where they must decide who to banish from the game, trying to identify the Traitor.

If all the remaining players are Faithful, then the prize money is divided evenly among them. However, if any Traitors remain, they win the entire pot.

== Contestants ==
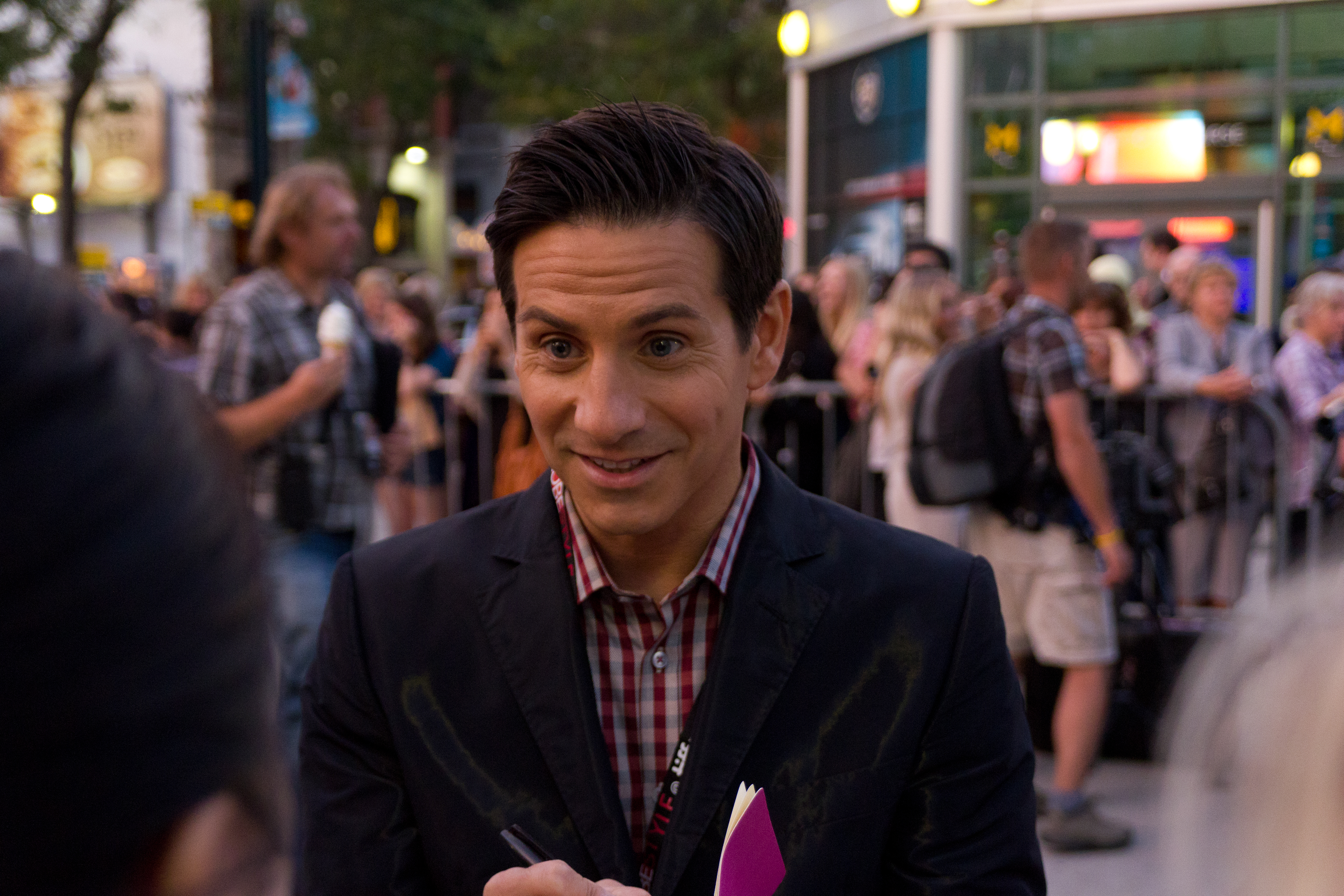
Rick Campanelli

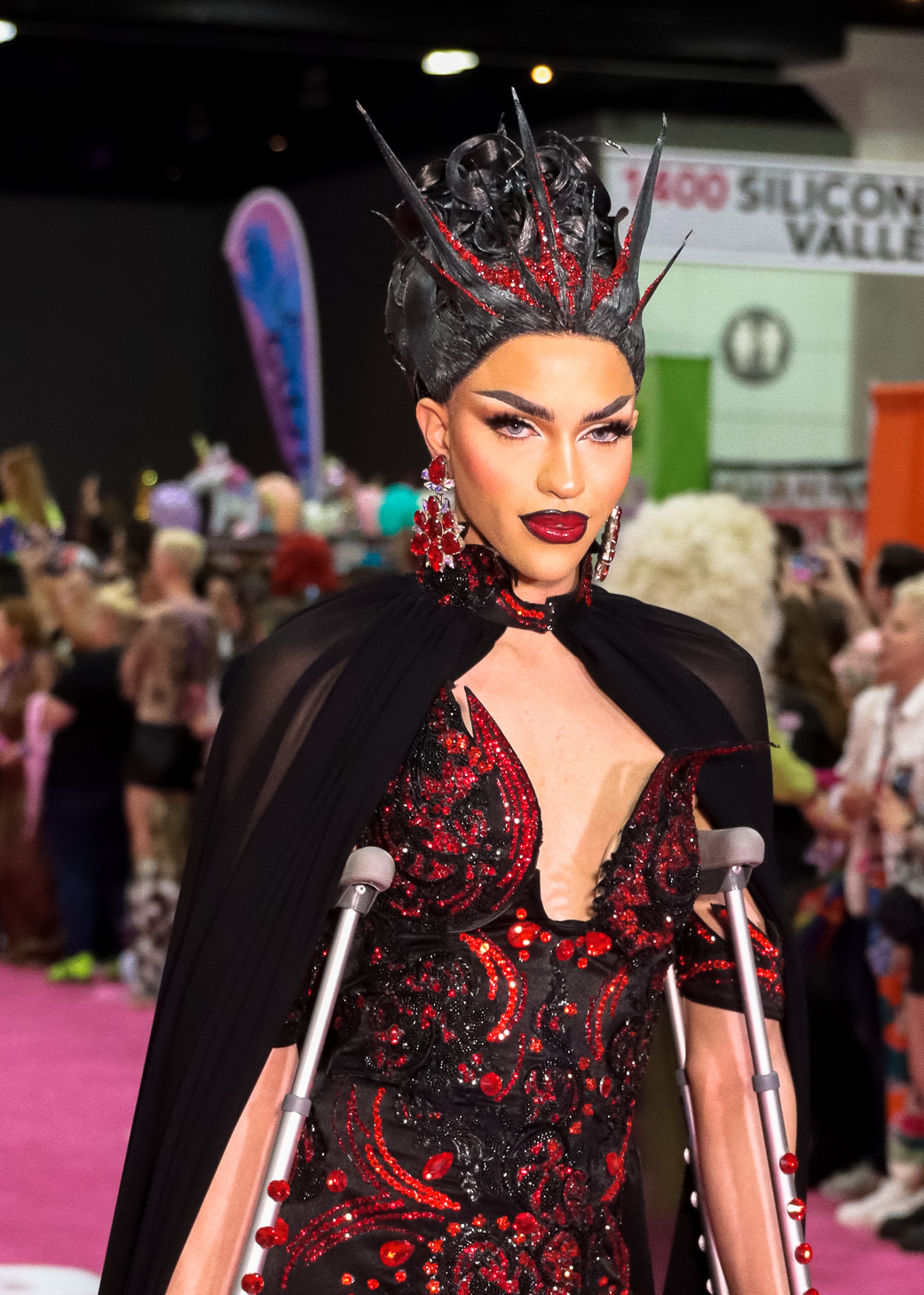
Miss Fiercalicious

Like the first season of the American counterpart, the contestants were divided, half being reality TV stars and the other half being regular people.

List of The Traitors contestants
Contestant	Age	From	Occupation/Original Series	Affiliation	Finish
Erika Casupanan	34	Toronto, Ontario	Survivor 41	Faithful	Murdered (Episode 2)
Collin Johnson	37	Thunder Bay, Ontario	Transit operator	Faithful	Banished (Episode 2)
Nazila Dehghani	47	Newmarket, Ontario	Dentist	Faithful	Murdered (Episode 3)
Melissa Best	35	St. John's, Newfoundland and Labrador	Realtor	Traitor	Banished (Episode 3)
Gurpyar Bains	25	Calgary, Alberta	Paediatric registered nurse	Faithful	Murdered (Episode 4)
Rick Campanelli	53	Burlington, Ontario	Former MuchMusic VJ and radio host	Faithful	Banished (Episode 5)
Crystal Mayes	50	Saskatoon, Saskatchewan	Nurse	Faithful	Murdered (Episode 5)
Miss Fiercalicious "Fierce"	27	Toronto, Ontario	Canada's Drag Race 3	Faithful	Banished (Episode 5)
Domenic Ielasi	32	Hamilton, Ontario	Game of Homes	Faithful	Disqualified (Episode 6)
Kevin Martin	30	Calgary, Alberta	Big Brother Canada 3	Faithful	Banished (Episode 6)
Mary Wisden	31	Courtenay, British Columbia	Housewife and amateur stand-up comic	Faithful	Murdered (Episode 7)
Melissa Allder	49	London, Ontario	ESL learning coordinator	Faithful	Banished (Episode 7)
Mai Nguyen	34	Edmonton, Alberta	MasterChef Canada 4	Faithful	Murdered (Episode 8)
Kuzie Mujakachi	29	Victoria, British Columbia	Big Brother Canada 11	Traitor	Banished (Episode 8)
Mickey Henry	34	Bala, Ontario	The Amazing Race Canada 2	Traitor (Note: Mickey was recruited as a Traitor in Episode 9.)	Banished (Episode 9)
Travon Smith	29	Toronto, Ontario	Public relations specialist	Faithful	Banished (Episode 10)
Donna Hartt	53	Calgary, Alberta	Psychic medium	Faithful	Banished (Episode 10)
Leroy Fontaine	38	Halifax, Nova Scotia	The Brigade: Race to the Hudson	Faithful	Banished (Episode 10)
Gurleen Maan	35	Abbotsford, British Columbia	Farming for Love	Faithful	Runner-up (Episode 10)
Mike D'Urzo	39	Toronto, Ontario	Magician and mentalist	Traitor	Winner (Episode 10)

=== Future appearances ===
In 2024, Kevin Martin and Gurleen Maan competed on The Amazing Race Canada 10.

In 2024, Miss Fiercalicious competed on Canada's Drag Race: Canada vs. the World season 2

== Episodes ==
The Traitors season 1 episodes
No. overall	No. in season	Title	Original release date
1	1	"Dead Man Walking"	October 2, 2023
2	2	"Keep Digging"	October 9, 2023
3	3	"This Act is to Die For"	October 16, 2023
4	4	"Landing the Shield"	October 23, 2023
5	5	"Sinners or Saints"	October 30, 2023
6	6	"Ghost Hunting"	November 6, 2023
7	7	"At The Bottom of the Barrel"	November 13, 2023
8	8	"Date with Destiny"	November 20, 2023
9	9	"There's No Escape"	November 27, 2023
10	10	"Trust Your Instincts"	December 4, 2023

== Elimination history ==
Key

The contestant was a Faithful.
The contestant was a Traitor.

Episode	2	3	4/5	5	6	7	8		9	10
Traitor's decision	Erika	Nazila	Gurpyar	Crystal	Kevin; Mary; Melissa A.	Mary	Mai		Mickey	None
Traitor's decision	Murder				Death Row (Note: Instead of selecting one Faithful to be murdered, the Traitors were asked to put three players to put on death row. The next night, only those three players would be up for elimination.)	Murder			Ultimatum (Note: Following Kuzie's banishment, Mike was offered the chance to meet a Faithful and offer them an ultimatum: become a Traitor or be Murdered. He chose Mickey, who accepted the offer.)	None
Immune	None		Kuzie	Mickey	Kevin	None				None
Banishment	Collin	Melissa B.	Rick	Fierce	Kevin	Melissa A.	Banish (Note: At the dinner party the final seven players were given a choice to either murder or banish. If the players banished a traitor $10,000 would be added to the prize pot, if they banished a faithful they would lose $10,000 from the prize pot, but if there was no banishment the prize pot would stay the same. There was an open vote. If all seven players choose banish there would be a banishment but if one player choose murder there would be a murder.)	Kuzie	Mickey	Travon
Vote	14–5	9–4–2– 1–1	11–3–1	7–3–2–1	7–2–2	7–2	7–0	5–2	3–2–1	4–1
Mike	Collin	Melissa B.	Rick	Travon	Kevin	Melissa A.	Banish	Kuzie	Mickey	Travon
Gurleen	Collin	Melissa B.	Rick	Mai	Donna	Melissa A.	Banish	Kuzie	Mickey	Travon
Leroy	Collin	Melissa B.	Rick	Fierce	Kevin	Melissa A.	Banish	Kuzie	Mickey	Travon
Donna	Collin	Kevin	Rick	Fierce	Kevin	Melissa A.	Banish	Kuzie	Mike	Travon
Travon	Collin	Kevin	Rick	Mary	Kevin	Melissa A.	Banish	Mike	Mike	Donna
Mickey	Collin	Rick	Rick	Fierce	Kevin	Melissa A.	Banish	Kuzie	Leroy	Banished (Episode 9)
Kuzie	Donna	Melissa B.	Rick	Fierce	Kevin	Melissa A.	Banish	Mike	Banished (Episode 8)	
Mai	Collin	Crystal	Rick	Travon	Kevin	Kuzie	Murdered (Episode 8)			
Melissa A.	Collin	Crystal	Rick	Fierce	Donna	Kuzie	Banished (Episode 7)			
Mary	Collin	Melissa B.	Travon	Fierce	Mike	Murdered (Episode 7)				
Kevin	Collin	Melissa B.	Travon	Travon	Mike	Banished (Episode 6)				
Domenic	Collin	Crystal	Rick	Fierce	Disqualified (Episode 6) (Note: Domenic was removed from the game for undisclosed specific reasons, beyond a breach of the game rules.)					
Fierce	Collin	Melissa B.	Rick	Mai	Banished (Episode 5)					
Crystal	Donna	Melissa B.	Mai	Murdered (Episode 5)						
Rick	Collin	Melissa B.	Travon	Banished (Episode 5)						
Gurpyar	Donna	Mike	Murdered (Episode 4)							
Melissa B.	Collin	Crystal	Banished (Episode 3)							
Nazila	Donna	Murdered (Episode 3)								
Collin	Donna	Banished (Episode 2)								
Erika	Murdered (Episode 2)									

=== End game ===
Episode	10				
Decision	Banish	Donna	Banish	Leroy	Game Over; Traitor Win
Vote	4–0	3–1	3–0	2–1	Game Over; Traitor Win
Mike	Banish	Donna	Banish	Leroy	Winner
Gurleen	Banish	Donna	Banish	Leroy	Runner-up
Leroy	Banish	Donna	Banish	Mike	Banished
Donna	Banish	Mike	Banished		

== Missions ==
Episode	Mission Description	Money Available	Money Earned	Total Pot	Shield Winner
1	As a group, the contestants had 30 minutes to blow up a quarry to expose a hidden $20,000 to add to the pot. In the group, eight runners would run up the hills to locate structural pieces and then carry down the detonator. Meanwhile, the other contestants have to locate cables scattered in the quarry. Each cable must be connected to the structure according to color, thus creating a rail that would blow up the quarry.	$20,000	$20,000	$20,000	—N/a
2	Six volunteers were led to an undisclosed location then buried alive. The remaining contestants were split into three teams, tasked with finding two buried contestants each. Those buried could communicate with their teammates using a walkie-talkie, and direct them to locations within the castle grounds using clues housed within their coffin. Each contestant rescued before the 45 minutes elapsed, would add $1,500 to the prize fund.	$9,000	$6,000	$26,000	—N/a
3	The contestants took turns to make their way across a laser-filled room, containing artifacts of different values. They had 30 minutes to transport as many artifacts as they could across the room; however, extra lasers were added after each successful attempt. Additionally, if someone triggered a laser, one minute was taken off the clock, and they were forced to drop out and wait their turn again.	$23,150	$10,000	$36,000	—N/a
4	The 15 remaining contestants were divided into two teams of 7 and 8, each with a designated team captain. This mission took place over three rounds, each lasting up to ten minutes. Captains had to memorize a landing pattern on the airstrip in order to direct their teammates to assemble it using the proper pieces. When both teams recreated the correct pattern within the allotted time, a plane would land and $2,000 was added to the pot. The team with the most correct patterns with the fastest times also gained access to the Armoury.	$6,000	$2,000	$38,000	Kuzie
5	The 13 remaining contestants were divided into two teams of 7 and 6, each with a representative entering a confessional booth in order to hear Karine read a page, paragraph, or a line reference. This information would then be relayed to their teammates. Using The Book of Traitors, they must find a riddle that would lead to a description of clothing worn by a member of that masked congregation. Only the first team to identify a counted item and each correctly identified item earned $2,000 for the pot. A total of three rounds were played, and the team that identified the most items correctly would be given first access to the Armoury, potentially earning a Shield.	$6,000	$6,000	$44,000	Mickey
6	The contestants are randomly picked for three teams, each captained by the three guests on Death Row (Kevin, Mary & Melissa A.). Each team took turns to enter Karine's parlor, which was strewn with an assortment of items. They were given a short amount of time to memorize these items and their placement, before the lights were dimmed and the voices of eliminated contestants aired. A total of three items would be swapped, and a team would have one minute to identify those changes and bring them to Karine. For each item the team correctly identified, $1,000 would be added to the prize pot. The team that identified the most items correctly (or within the fastest time, in the case of a tie) would earn their captain an Armoury Pass.	$9,000	$3,000	$47,000	Kevin
7	As a group, the contestants had 45 minutes to transport whiskey barrels through a forest. Along the path were fifteen barrels valued between $250 and $6,000. Barrels making it across the finish line before time was up, would add money to the pot. If any of the Armoury barrels crossed the finish line, the group could select any of a number of contestants to go to the Armoury. The group was able to get five barrels across, including the main $6,000 barrel. No Armoury barrels crossed the finish line before time expired.	$19,500	$10,500	$57,500	—N/a
8	In a different variation on the Carnival Wheel, Karine will randomly pick three contestants to participate in the "Disappearing Box". The remaining contestants on the ground will have to answer questions with the name of a contestant on the Box. Each contestant on the Box would also answer the question, and for each of their answers matching the group's answers, $500 was added to the prize fund. Those on the Box have a balloon representing a lifeline: If they hear their name once, they must release the balloon; if they hear it twice, they are banished from the game. An eliminated contestant is replaced by a randomly picked individual. The Mission continued until only one contestant remains on the ground and one contestant on the Box is eliminated.	$12,000	$9,000	$66,500	—N/a
9	The guests who were absent at breakfast (Gurleen & Travon), were taken inside a fort. The remaining players followed Karine to the fort and were tasked with rescuing the players being held. To do so, they must collect three correct keys from fifteen wanted posters corresponding to the hostages. Then, using the catapult to deliver the keys inside the fort, the taken players will use them to unlock one of the locks, which will light up bulbs outside the fort, indicating success. In order to find the correct key, the insiders will state one word on the wanted poster describing their features, hairstyles, or accessories. They will send that word to the outsiders using a Morse code communication system to interpret the word. If the key the insider received does not work, they will send another clue word to the outsiders to help narrow things down. If the insiders manage to unlock all three locks and escape within 30 minutes, the group will earn $1,000 for each key that was left on the wanted poster board. The maximum amount of money they could earn is up to $12,000 choosing all three correct keys.	$12,000	$11,000	$87,500	—N/a
10	The Final Five contestants were divided into two groups of two and three. In the forest they were tied together and had bags in their heads. After removing the rope that bound them, the contestants will open a small box on the ground, revealing the final mission of the season: Using the rope, the compass in the box, and the clues in a note, each group will search for bags, each worth $1,000 in gold coins, hidden in five different locations in the forest. When the contestants hear the flare gun sound, they must search for the signal on a walkie-talkie, which Karine revealed they have three minutes to run and swim into the middle of the lake to find a large chest floating on a board. They must then drop the gold coins in the chest and attach a cable to Karine's helicopter before the time runs out in order to earn the final prize.	$10,000	$7,000	$94,500	—N/a
