= Abask =

E-commerce platform

ABASK
- Company type: Private limited company
- Founded: 2022
- Headquarters: London, UK
- Area served: Worldwide
- Founders: Tom Chapman (businessman); Nicolas Pickaerts
- Industry: Luxury, E-commerce, Homeware
- Products: Luxury home-design goods
- Website: abask.com

ABASK is a luxury e-commerce platform offering homeware, clothing and gifting products with headquarters in London. It was founded in 2022 by Tom Chapman, co-founder of the online retailer Matches Fashion, and Nicolas Pickaerts.

== History ==
ABASK was co-founded in 2022 by Tom Chapman and Nicolas Pickaerts, who worked together at Matches Fashion. The platform launched with a curation of home-design pieces to collect and gift, many of which are available only at ABASK, but expanded in 2024 to include The Closet, a series of garments and accessories to wear at home. ABASK currently works with more than 350 makers and artists from across the globe.

== Operations ==
ABASK's full curation is in stock and ready to ship to 165+ countries within two to six days. All orders are packaged in recyclable boxes with original artwork designed by Paris-based artist Sarah Martinon.

ABASK is primarily a direct-to-consumer platform, however also has a trade program dedicated to special projects such as luxury real estate, interior design schemes, yachts, private jets and more. ABASK works with globally renowned names, including AD100 private residential and hospitality designers.

== Collaborations ==
In the few years since its founding, ABASK has worked on a number of collaborative projects, from its launch announcement in Milan's Villa Borsani to physical activations at Salon Art + Design in New York and Palm Beach International Boat Show.

In 2024, ABASK partnered with New York-based design gallery R & Company to celebrate the talents of 28 global artists through a series of collectible artworks, as well as Mahnaz Collection, the acclaimed New York-based gallery founded by Mahnaz Ispahani Bartos with an eclectic collection of modern and vintage jewelry. In the same year, ABASK collaborated with Studio Shamshiri on its first in-house product line, which comprised cashmere blankets and accessories handmade by Nepalese craftspeople. Other collaborative efforts include the bringing together of renowned photographer Douglas Friedman and Viennese glassmaker Lobmeyr on a series of Texan-inspired glassware, a selection of archival re-editions from NasonMoretti, and a line of hand-blown Murano glass portable lights from Green Wolf Lighting x Solange Azagury-Partridge.
