= The Traitors Canada season 2 =

Canadian television series season

The Traitors Canada
- Season 2
- Promotional poster
- Presented by: Karine Vanasse
- No. of contestants: 22
- Winner: Neda Kalantar
- Runner-up: Tranna Wintour
- Location: The Manoir Rouville-Campbell, Montérégie région
- No. of episodes: 10

Release
- Original network: CTV
- Original release: September 23 – December 2, 2024

Season chronology
- ← Previous; Season 1 Next → Season 3

The second season of the Canadian television series The Traitors Canada premiered on CTV on September 23, 2024, with episodes being released weekly. The season was won by Big Brother Canada contestant Neda Kalantar, as a traitor, with Tranna Wintour placing as a runner-up, as a faithful.

== Production ==
The season is produced similar to its American counterpart. However, the show is filmed at an historic manor, The Manoir Rouville-Campbell in Mont-Saint-Hilaire in the Montérégie région.

Like the first season of The Traitors Canada, this season featured ten former reality television participants and ten members of the general public.

== Format ==
The contestants arrived at the castle and are referred to as the "Faithful." Among them are the "Traitors," a group of contestants secretly selected by the host, Karine Vanasse. Each night, the Traitors would decide on whom to "murder," and that same contestant would leave the game. After the end of each day, where the contestants participated in various challenges to add money to the prize fund, they would participate in the Round Table, where they must decide who to banish from the game, trying to identify the Traitor.

If all the remaining players are Faithful, then the prize money is divided evenly among them. However, if any Traitors remain, they win the entire pot.

== Contestants ==
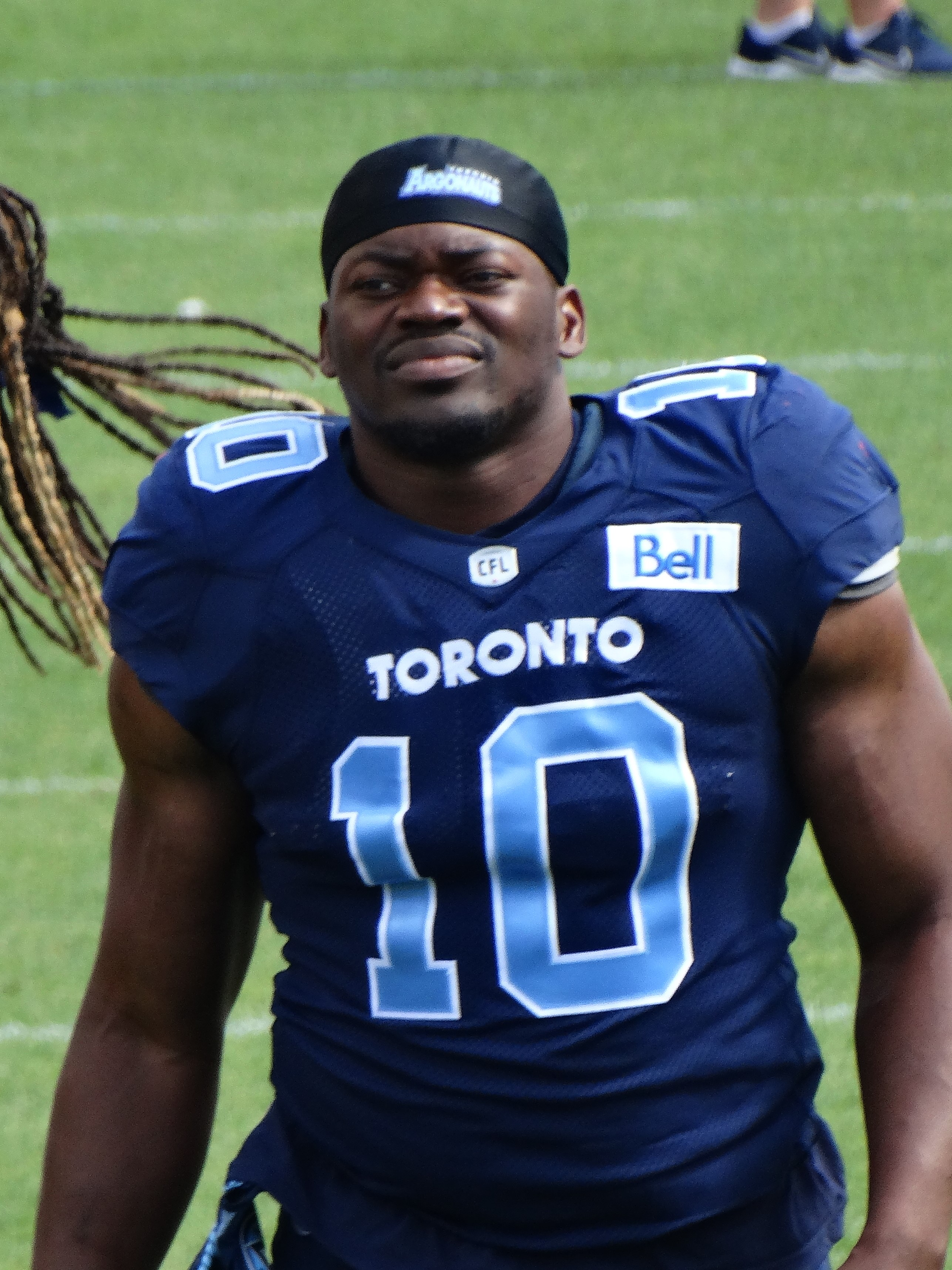
Hénoc Muamba

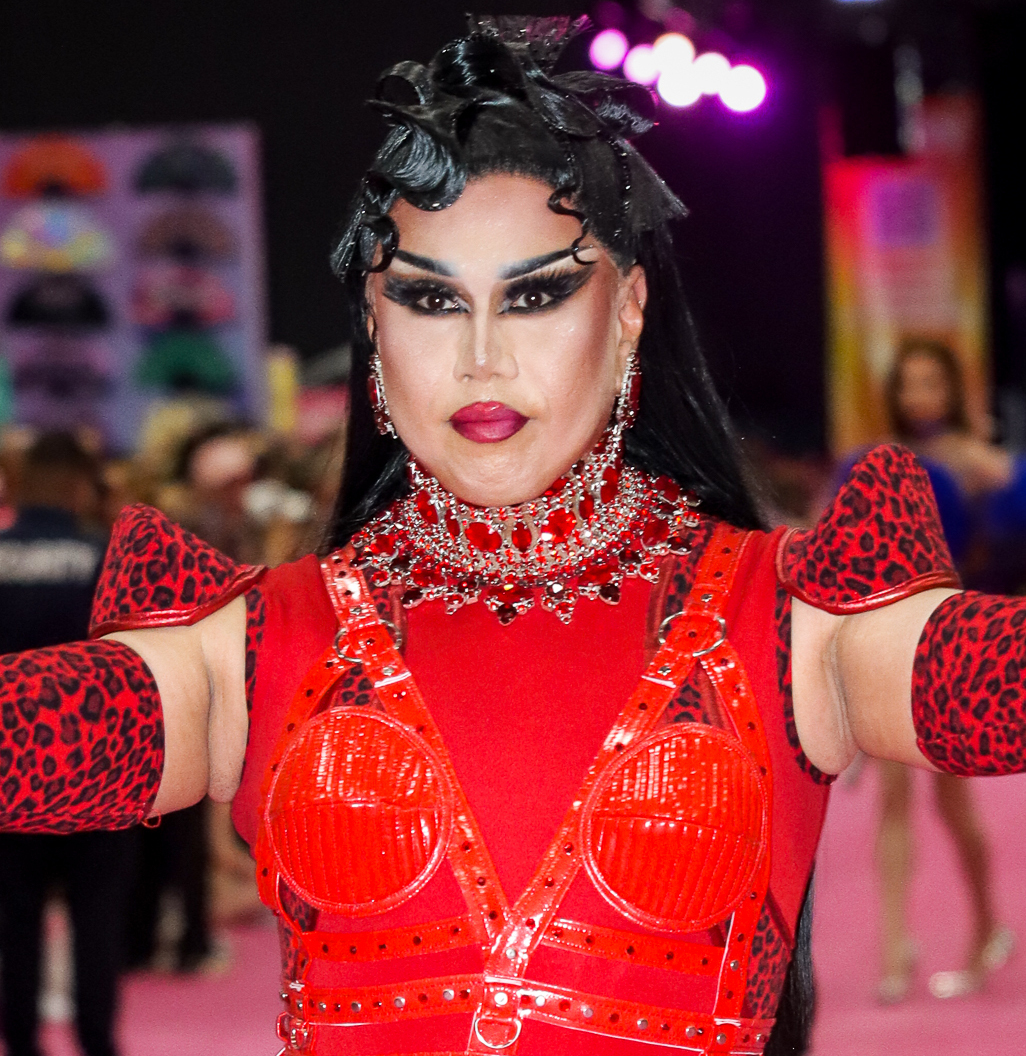
Melinda Verga

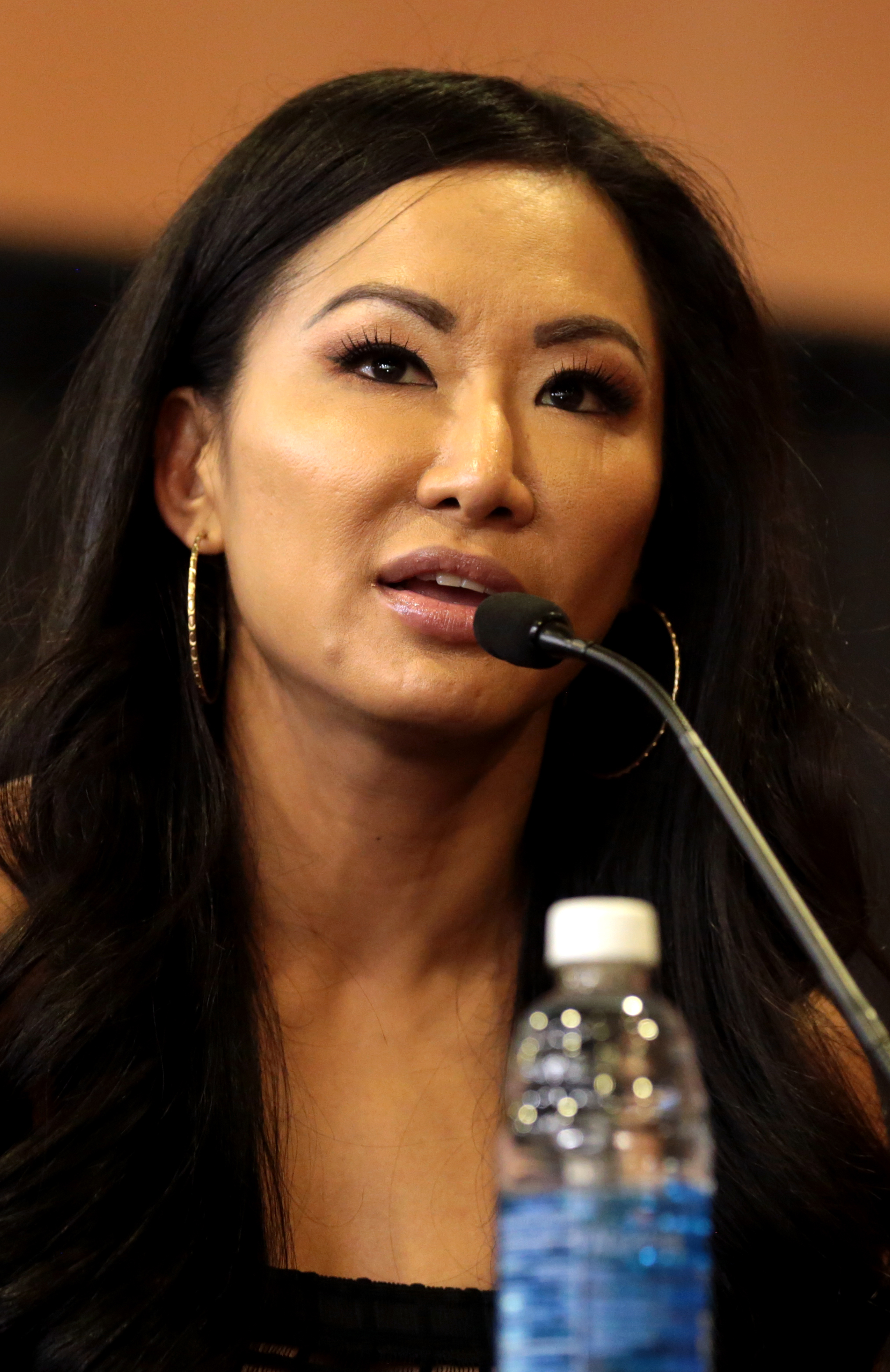
Gail Kim

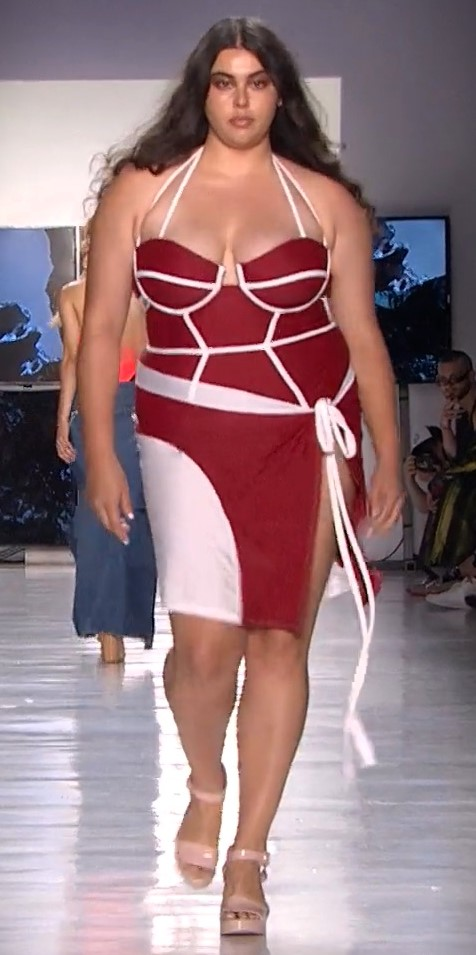
Lauren Chan

Similar to the first season, the cast consists of half reality TV stars and notable personalities and half civilian contestants. Additionally, a pre-existing relationship was included in the cast, with YouTuber siblings Kyra and Nick Provost competing against each other.

List of The Traitors contestants
Contestant	Age	From	Occupation/Original Series	Affiliation	Finish
Chris James	38	Calgary, Alberta	Naked and Afraid	Faithful	Murdered (Episode 2)
Rabecca Snelgrove	35	St. John's, Newfoundland and Labrador	Cheerleader	Faithful	Banished (Episode 2)
Nichelle Laus	49	Mississauga, Ontario	Former police officer	Faithful	Murdered (Episode 3)
Mary Jo Eustace	62	Los Angeles, USA	Author & podcast host	Faithful	Banished (Episode 3)
Hénoc Muamba	35	Toronto, Ontario	Retired professional football player	Faithful	Murdered (Episode 4)
Kirkland Douglas	35	Rosedale, British Columbia	Farming for Love 2	Faithful	Banished (Episode 4)
Dillon Waldron	55	Toronto, Ontario	Lobbyist	Faithful	Murdered (Episode 5)
Jasmee Toor	34	Montreal, Quebec	Entrepreneur & music artist	Faithful	Banished (Episode 5)
Melinda Verga	44	Edmonton, Alberta	Canada's Drag Race 4	Faithful	Banished (Episode 6)
Mike Browne	55	Langley, British Columbia	True crime podcast host & author	Faithful	Murdered (Episode 7)
Aaron Ellis	28	Bayswater, Nova Scotia	Security manager	Faithful	Banished (Episode 7)
Pakman Khokhar	28	Dubai, United Arab Emirates	Content Creator	Faithful	Murdered (Episode 8)
Michael John Ferri	52	Windsor, Ontario	Paranormal enthusiast	Traitor	Banished (Episode 8)
Gail Kim	46	Tampa, USA	The Amazing Race Canada 9	Faithful	Murdered (Episode 9)
Kyra Provost	30	Surrey, British Columbia	Fitness YouTuber	Traitor	Banished (Episode 9)
Nick Provost	32	Ottawa, Ontario	YouTuber	Faithful	Murdered (Episode 10)
Kevin Wendt	40	Burlington, Ontario	The Bachelorette Canada	Faithful	Banished (Episode 10)
Cedric Newman	53	Montreal, Quebec	The Amazing Race Canada 8	Faithful	Banished (Episode 10)
Laurie McIntosh	56	Lethbridge, Alberta	Kindergarten Teacher	Faithful	Banished (Episode 10)
Lauren Chan	33	Brooklyn, USA	Model & entrepreneur	Faithful	Banished (Episode 10)
Tranna Wintour	36	Montreal, Quebec	Big Brother Célébrités 2	Faithful	Runner-up (Episode 10)
Neda Kalantar	33	Paris, France	Big Brother Canada 2	Traitor	Winner (Episode 10)

== Episodes ==
The Traitors season 2 episodes
No. overall	No. in season	Title	Original release date
11	1	"A Sacrificial Arrival"	September 23, 2024
12	2	"The Hunt Has Begun"	September 30, 2024
13	3	"Ride Or Die"	October 7, 2024
14	4	"A Secret Mission"	October 14, 2024
15	5	"Sinners or Saints"	October 21, 2024
16	6	"The Cage"	November 4, 2024
17	7	"The Art of Manipulation"	November 11, 2024
18	8	"The Trust"	November 18, 2024
19	9	"Tensions Rising"	November 25, 2024
20	10	"Dig to the End"	December 2, 2024

== Elimination history ==
Key

The contestant was a Faithful.
The contestant was a Traitor.

Episode	1	2	3	4	5	6	7	8	9	10	
Traitor's decision	Chris; Dillon; Hénoc; Kevin; Lauren	Chris	Nichelle	Hénoc	Dillon (Note: Dillon was murdered after the Roundtable on Episode 4 by a Traitor Michael, after giving him a "Death Handshake" as Dillon said "I Trust You". This murder was only revealed to the viewers and the other players during Episode 5's Breakfast.)	Gail	Mike	Pakman	Gail	Nick	None
Traitor's decision	Death Row (Note: Before the selection of Traitors, Karine offered to add $10,000 in exchange for 5 players putting themselves onto Death Row, nominating themselves for the first Murder.)	Murder				Cage (Note: Karine requested that the Traitors cage someone for the next mission, who would be murdered if they cannot be freed. Gail was chosen to be caged and was rescued during the mission.)	Murder				None
Immune	None	None	Dillon; Lauren	Cedric; Nick	Michael	None	Cedric; Lauren; Neda; Nick	None			None
Banishment	None	Rabecca	Mary Jo	Kirkland	Jasmee	Melinda	Aaron	Michael	Kyra	Kevin	Cedric
Vote	None	9–5–4– 2–1	14–5	6–4–3– 2–2	9–5–1	12–1–1	7–2–2–1	6-2–2	5–2–1	4–2	4–1
Neda	No; Vote	Rabecca	Mary Jo	Cedric	Jasmee	Melinda	Aaron	Michael	Kyra	Kevin	Cedric
Tranna	No; Vote	Mike	Kirkland	Kirkland	Aaron	Michael	Aaron	Cedric	Kyra	Kevin	Cedric
Lauren	No; Vote	Mike	Mary Jo	Cedric	Cedric	Melinda	Aaron	Michael	Kyra	Kevin	Cedric
Laurie	No; Vote	Rabecca	Mary Jo	Cedric	Jasmee	Melinda	Aaron	Lauren	Neda	Kevin	Cedric
Cedric	No; Vote	Rabecca	Mary Jo	Kirkland	Jasmee	Melinda	Aaron	Michael	Kyra	Lauren	Lauren
Kevin	No; Vote	Rabecca	Mary Jo	Mike	Jasmee	Melinda	Aaron	Lauren	Kyra	Lauren	Banished (Episode 10)
Nick	No; Vote	Cedric	Mary Jo	Melinda	Cedric	Melinda	Michael	Michael	Lauren	Murdered (Episode 10)	
Kyra	No; Vote	Cedric	Mary Jo	Kirkland	Cedric	Melinda	Laurie	Michael	Lauren	Banished (Episode 9)	
Gail	No; Vote	Mike	Mary Jo	Jasmee	Jasmee	Melinda	Aaron	Michael	Murdered (Episode 9)		
Michael	No; Vote	Rabecca	Kirkland	Kirkland	Jasmee	Melinda	Cedric	Cedric	Banished (Episode 8)		
Pakman	No; Vote	Cedric	Mary Jo	Kirkland	Jasmee	Melinda	Michael	Murdered (Episode 8)			
Aaron	No; Vote	Mike	Mary Jo	Mike	Jasmee	Melinda	Cedric	Banished (Episode 7)			
Mike	No; Vote	Michael	Mary Jo	Jasmee	Jasmee	Melinda	Murdered (Episode 7)				
Melinda	No; Vote	Rabecca	Kirkland	Kirkland	Cedric	Cedric	Banished (Episode 6)				
Jasmee	No; Vote	Aaron	Kirkland	Mike	Cedric	Banished (Episode 5)					
Dillon	No; Vote	Cedric	Mary Jo	Mike	Murdered (Episode 5)						
Kirkland	No; Vote	Rabecca	Mary Jo	Melinda	Banished (Episode 4)						
Hénoc	No; Vote	Michael	Mary Jo	Murdered (Episode 4)							
Mary Jo	No; Vote	Rabecca	Kirkland	Banished (Episode 3)							
Nichelle	No; Vote	Rabecca	Murdered (Episode 3)								
Rabecca	No; Vote	Cedric	Banished (Episode 2)								
Chris	No; Vote	Murdered (Episode 2)									

=== End game ===
Episode	10				
Decision	Banish	Laurie	Banish	Lauren	Game Over; Traitor Win
Vote	2–2	2–1–1	2–1	2–1	Game Over; Traitor Win
Neda	Banish	Laurie	Banish	Lauren	Winner
Tranna	Banish	Lauren	Banish	Lauren	Runner-up
Lauren	End Game	Laurie	End Game	Tranna	Banished
Laurie	End Game	Neda	Banished		

== Missions ==
Episode	Mission Description	Money Available	Money Earned	Total Pot	Shield Winner
1	Before roles were assigned, the contestants were offered $10,000, should 5 of them volunteer to be put on Death Row for the first murder.	$10,000	$10,000	$10,000	Aaron; Cedric; Gail; Jasmee; Kirkland; Kyra; Laurie; Mary Jo; Melinda; Michael; Mike; Neda; Nichelle; Nick; Pakman; Rabecca; Tranna (Note: As Chris, Dillon, Hénoc, Kevin, Lauren each volunteered for Death Row, everyone else became safe from the first murder.)
1	The contestants must destroy a wooden tower with cannons. However, they only have 20 minutes to find as many cannonballs as possible in the forest to fire from the cannons. Some cannonballs are hidden individually in the woods, while others are rewards for solving various puzzles or riddles. The contestants find 28 balls, and are successful in bringing down the tower, adding a total of $10,000 to the pot.	$10,000	$10,000	$20,000	No Shield on offer
2	The contestants pull a large trojan horse. On the way, the group answered up to 10 questions with answers given by the traitors. They collect $1,000 for each correct answer, and bags of sand to weigh down the horse for each incorrect answer. Adding a possible total of $10,000 for the pot. If they are able to pull the horse across the finish line in time, any money earned is added to the pot. If they do not cross the line in time, no money is added.	$10,000	$0	$20,000	No Shield on offer
3	The contestants go to a minefield to answer statements on top of the mine. True statements allow you to collect gold coins, while false statements cause an explosion. Two Shields were hidden under the most erroneously incorrect statement (which named the host as Claudia)	$10,000	$9,000	$29,000	Lauren Dillon
4	Five contestants describe what is hidden in a box to the rest of the group. The other contestants decide if the person is telling the truth or not with correct answers earning $2,000 each while false answers allows the individual contestant to a dagger allowing double votes at the round table or a shield.	$10,000	$6,000	$35,000	Cedric Nick
5	Seven contestants selected by the traitors go to church to decide which of the seven coffins representing the seven deadly sins they belong to. There are clues to help the contestants. The other group of contestants are asked individually if they wish to bid for a shield from the prize money with the highest bidder winning the shield. The identity of the winner is kept secret by Karine.	$10,000	$2,500	$37,500	Michael
6	Player Gail is locked in a cage and the other contestants need to find clues in the library to send their teammates information at the gravestone of six people. The clues allow the contestants to spell out a word on unlock money. Each correct answer is worth $1,500 and allows the contestants to pick one of six keys which may open the cage to save Gail.	$9,000	$4,500	$42,000	No Shield on offer
7	The contestants are divided into three teams. One member of each team must describe a painting to a fellow member who must paint a portrait of the painting. The two remaining members must use the description to try find the painting. Players must change their role on the team in subsequent rounds. The jackpot is $3,500 for each correct answer.	$31,500	$7,000	$49,000	Cedric
7	The contestants are divided into three teams. One member of each team must describe a painting to a fellow member who must paint a portrait of the painting. The two remaining members must use the description to try find the painting. Players must change their role on the team in subsequent rounds. The jackpot is $3,500 for each correct answer.	$31,500	$7,000	$49,000	Lauren
7	The contestants are divided into three teams. One member of each team must describe a painting to a fellow member who must paint a portrait of the painting. The two remaining members must use the description to try find the painting. Players must change their role on the team in subsequent rounds. The jackpot is $3,500 for each correct answer.	$31,500	$7,000	$49,000	Neda
7	The contestants are divided into three teams. One member of each team must describe a painting to a fellow member who must paint a portrait of the painting. The two remaining members must use the description to try find the painting. Players must change their role on the team in subsequent rounds. The jackpot is $3,500 for each correct answer.	$31,500	$7,000	$49,000	Nick
8	The contestants must select the best two players at communicating. Tranna and Lauren are chosen to guide the blindfolded contestants who must cross a wooden bridge trying to grab bags of money overhead. The player must collect bags of money of different denominations and reach the end the bridge. That money is added to the jackpot. After the mission the players privately voted for the least trustworthy. Cedric was voted the least trustworthy. Cedric was given the option of keeping the money from the mission or putting the money in the prize pot, where it would be doubled. Cedric chose to keep the money.		$0	$49,000	No Shield on offer
9	The contestants are blindfolded and taken to a wooded area. They must find the key to unlock their chains. They must find a field of scarecrows to search for gold.	$10,000	$8,500	$57,500	No Shield on offer
10	The contestants must change into periodic costume and solve three puzzles along the way. Afterwards they must dig at the graves of their former colleagues to find gold that they ever unable to find on their previous missions.		$14,500	$72,000	No Shield on offer
