= The Traitors Canada season 4 =

The Traitors Canada
- Season 4
- Promotional poster
- Presented by: Karine Vanasse
- No. of contestants: 22
- Location: The Manoir Rouville-Campbell, Montérégie région
- No. of episodes: 6

Release
- Original network: CTV
- Original release: September 21, 2026 – present

Season chronology
- ← Previous; Season 3

The fourth season of the Canadian television series The Traitors Canada premiered on CTV on September 21, 2026, with episodes being released weekly.

== Production ==
Similar to the previous seasons, primary filming takes place at The Manoir Rouville-Campbell, adjacent to Mont-Saint-Hilaire in the Montérégie région. The season filmed May 1st, 2026 to May 13th, 2026.

== Format ==
The contestants arrive at the castle and are referred to as the "Faithful." Among them are the "Traitors," a group of contestants secretly selected by the host, Karine Vanasse. Each night, the Traitors decide who to "murder," and that same contestant leaves the game. At the end of each day, where the contestants participate in various challenges to add money to the prize fund, they participate in the Round Table, where they must decide who to banish from the game, trying to identify one of the Traitors.

If, at the end of the season, all the remaining players are Faithful, then the prize money is divided evenly among them. However, if any Traitors remain, they win the entire pot.

This season carried on an added rule from Season 3: if the players banish a traitor, they add $10,000 to the pot.

== Contestants ==
Similar to the first three seasons, the cast consists of half reality TV stars and notable personalities and half civilian contestants. Season 4 notably features the first returning contestant in Traitors Canada with Ty McDonald returning after being the first murdered player last season, and is the first season of the Traitors to feature multiple drag queens as contestants, Icesis Couture & Van Goth.

List of The Traitors Canada season 4 contestants
Contestant	Age	From	Occupation/Original Series	Affiliation	Finish
Karen Mirsky	48	Vancouver, British Columbia	Criminal defense lawyer	Faithful	Murdered (Episode 1)
Katelyn Sinclair	36	Vancouver, British Columbia	Family physician	Traitor	Banished (Episode 2)
Elan Bibas	25	Toronto, Ontario	Love Island USA 7	Faithful	Banished (Episode 2)
Kane Fritzler	28	Calgary, Alberta	Survivor 44	Faithful	Banished (Episode 3)
McKinley "Kiki" Pugh	22	Burlington, Ontario	Student	Faithful	Murdered (Episode 4)
Taya Valkyrie	42	Los Angeles, California	All Elite Wrestling professional wrestler	Traitor	Banished (Episode 4)
Skylene "Nipîy Iskwew" Gladue	46	Edmonton, Alberta	The Amazing Race Canada 11	Faithful	Murdered (Episode 5)
Bri Theurer		The Blue Mountains, Ontario	Medium	Faithful	Banished (Episode 5)
Niroja Thirugnanasampanthar	32	Edmonton, Alberta	Senior program manager	Faithful	Murdered (Episode 6)
Van Goth	28	Toronto, Ontario	Canada's Drag Race 6	Faithful	Banished (Episode 6)
Jeremy Bieber	51	Stratford, Ontario	Strategic advisor/Justin Bieber’s Father	Faithful	Murdered (Episode 7)
Félix Dolci	24	Montreal, Quebec	Olympic Gymnast, Big Brother Célébrités 6	Faithful	Banished (Episode 7)
Jordan Chong	40	North Vancouver, British Columbia	Therapist	Faithful	Murdered (Episode 8)
Terrell "Ty" McDonald The Traitors Canada 3	31	Hamilton, Ontario	Big Brother Canada 11	Faithful	Banished (Episode 8)
Keturah Alexander		Vancouver, British Columbia	Teacher	Faithful	Murdered (Episode 9)
Kyle Dalton	29	Cape Broyle, Newfoundland & Labrador	Christmas tree salesman	Faithful	Banished (Episode 9)
Aisha Afeahure	24	Toronto, Ontario	Student	Faithful	Participating
Cassandra Vilgrain	31	Calgary, Alberta	Sports media & communications manager	Faithful	Participating
Icesis Couture	39	Ottawa, Ontario	Canada's Drag Race 2	Faithful	Participating
Ronnie Stevenson	58	West Vancouver, British Columbia	The Real Housewives of Vancouver	Faithful	Participating
Sherod Beneby	32	Toronto, Ontario	HR consultant	Traitor (Note: Sherod was recruited as a Traitor in Episode 2.)	Participating
Victoria "Spicy Vee" Woghiren	32	Hamilton, Ontario	Big Brother Canada 9	Traitor	Participating

== Episodes ==
The Traitors Canada season 4 episodes
No. overall	No. in season	Title	Original release date
31	1	"The Spark"	September 21, 2026
32	2	"A Shot in the Dark"	September 28, 2026
33	3	"Borrowed Time"	October 5, 2026
34	4	"The Misfits"	October 12, 2026
35	5	"The Heir"	October 19, 2026
36	6	"A Taste Of Death"	October 26, 2026
37	7	"Creepy Little Secret"	November 2, 2026
38	8	"Crystal Clear"	November 9, 2026
39	9	"For Better or For Worse"	November 16, 2026
40	10	"From Ashes to Gold"	November 23, 2026

== Elimination history ==
Key
The contestant was a Faithful
The contestant was a Traitor
The contestant was an Heir to the Traitors

Episode	1		2		3	4	5		6		7	8	9	10
Traitor's Decision	Aisha; Karen; Katelyn	Karen	Sherod		~~Kiki~~ (Note: At the end of episode 2, the Traitors decided to murder Kiki. However, Kiki secretly had won a shield during the previous mission and was spared from elimination.)	Kiki (Note: After the Round Table in Episode 3, the Traitors were tasked to murder someone in plain sight, by locking them behind one of the castle's doors.)	Ty	Nipîy	Niroja	Cassandra; Jeremy; Van Goth	Jeremy	Jordan	Keturah	
Traitor's Decision	Death Row (Note: After the first mission, the three players remaining in cages were placed on Death Row.)	Murder	Seduce (Note: Instead of choosing to murder a player, the Traitors decided to offer Sherod the opportunity to become a Traitor. He accepted their offer.)		Murder		Deem Heir (Note: After the Round Table in Episode 4, the Traitors were tasked to designate an Heir from the remaining Faithfuls. The Heir, who would be informed of their new status, was contracted to join the Traitors at their future request. The Traitors decided to designate Ty as the Heir.)	Murder		Death Row (Note: Cassandra, Jeremy, and Van Goth were placed on Death Row by virtue of eating a poisoned strawberry during breakfast. As Cassandra was saved during the subsequent mission, and Van Goth was banished during the sixth Round Table, Jeremy was murdered by default.)	Murder	Murder		
Shield	None	None	Icesis; Jordan; Kiki; Kyle; Nipîy; Sherod; Spicy Vee; Ty		None	Félix; Jordan; Ty	Cassandra; Félix; Keturah		None	Cassandra	Icesis; Spicy Vee; Ty	None	Icesis; Kyle	
Banishment	None	Tie (Note: The first round of voting resulted in a tie. Per the rules, a second vote was held where the players involved in the tie would not vote and the remaining players could only vote for those who tied.)	Katelyn	Elan	Kane	Taya	Bri		Van Goth		Félix	Ty	Kyle	
Vote	None	6–6–3–2– 2–1–1	12–7 (Note: Katelyn's banishment was revealed in Episode 2 after the tied vote ended on a cliffhanger in Episode 1.)	14–3–2–1	15–3–1	10–3–1– 1–1–1	8–4–1–1–1		11–1–1		10–1	5–4	6-1	
Aisha	No; Vote	Ty	Katelyn	Elan	Kane	Kyle	Bri		Van Goth		Félix	Ty	Kyle	
Cassandra	No; Vote	Katelyn	Katelyn	Elan	Kane	Taya	Bri		Van Goth		Félix	Ty	Kyle	
Icesis	No; Vote	Jeremy	Ty	Elan	Kane	Bri	Keturah		Van Goth		Félix	Ty	Kyle	
Ronnie	No; Vote	Bri	Katelyn	Aisha	Aisha	Taya	Aisha		Van Goth		Félix	Aisha	Kyle	
Sherod	No; Vote	Katelyn	Katelyn	Elan	Kane	Taya	Aisha		Van Goth		Félix	Aisha	Kyle	
Spicy Vee	No; Vote	Bri	Katelyn	Elan	Kane	Taya	Aisha		Van Goth		Félix	Aisha	Kyle	
Kyle	No; Vote	Ty	Katelyn	Elan	Kane	Jeremy	Aisha		Van Goth		Félix	Ty	Aisha	Banished (Episode 9)
Keturah	No; Vote	Bri	Katelyn	Elan	Kane	Taya	Bri		Van Goth		Félix	Ty	Murdered (Episode 9)	
Ty	No; Vote	Katelyn	No vote	Elan	Kane	Taya	Bri		Van Goth		Félix	Aisha	Banished (Episode 8)	
Jordan	No; Vote	Elan	Katelyn	Elan	Kane	Taya	Bri		Van Goth		Félix	Murdered (Episode 8)		
Félix	No; Vote	Katelyn	Katelyn	Aisha	Kane	Taya	Bri		Van Goth		Aisha	Banished (Episode 7)		
Jeremy	No; Vote	Ty	Ty	Taya	Kyle	Taya	Kyle		Félix		Murdered (Episode 7)			
Van Goth	No; Vote	Ty	Ty	Elan	Kyle	Bri	Bri		Kyle		Banished (Episode 6)			
Niroja	No; Vote	Kane	Katelyn	Aisha	Kane	Ty	Bri		Murdered (Episode 6)					
Bri	No; Vote	Ty	Ty	Elan	Kane	Taya	Félix		Banished (Episode 5)					
Nipîy	No; Vote	Katelyn	Katelyn	Elan	Kane	Van Goth	Murdered (Episode 5)							
Taya	No; Vote	Jeremy	Ty	Elan	Kane	Bri	Banished (Episode 4)							
Kiki	No; Vote	Katelyn	Katelyn	Kyle	Kane	Murdered (Episode 4)								
Kane	No; Vote	Taya	Ty	Elan	Kyle	Banished (Episode 3)								
Elan	No; Vote	Taya	Ty	Taya	Banished (Episode 2)									
Katelyn	No; Vote	Ty	No vote	Banished (Episode 2)										
Karen	No; Vote	Murdered (Episode 1)												
