= Melinda Verga =

Canadian drag performer

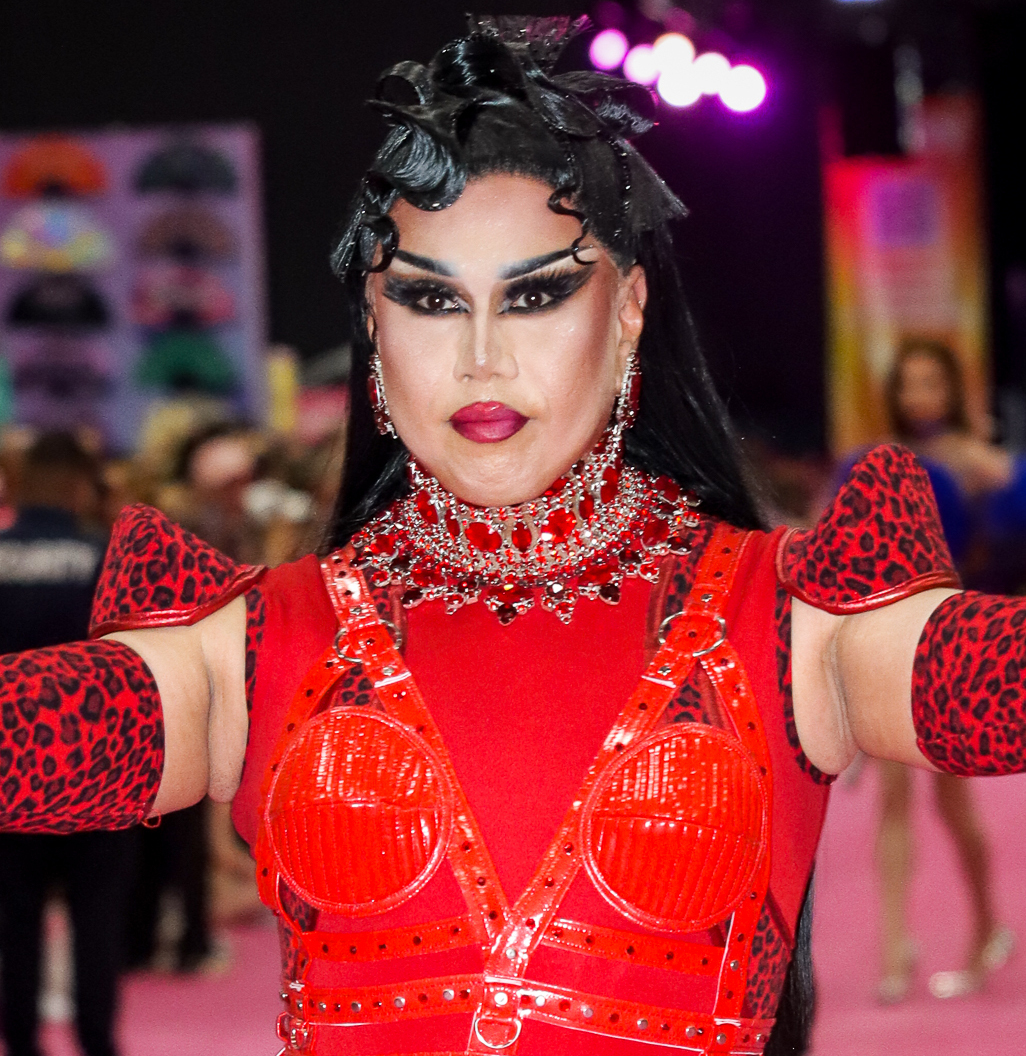
- Melinda Verga at RuPaul's DragCon LA, 2024
- Born: Mike Derrada; November 20, 1978 (age 47); The Philippines
- Television: Canada's Drag Race; The Traitors Canada; RuPaul's Drag Race: UK vs. the World
- Website: melindaverga.com

Melinda Verga is the stage name of Mike Derrada, a Filipino-Canadian drag performer known for competing on season 4 of Canada's Drag Race, season 2 of The Traitors Canada, and season 3 of RuPaul's Drag Race: UK vs. the World.

== Career ==
Derrada is a drag performer known as Melinda Verga. She was named Mz. Gay Edmonton 2017 and Edmonton Drag Idol Winner 2018, and has performed at Jasper Pride. Prior to appearing on Drag Race, her day job was in the shipping industry.

Melinda Verga competed on season 4 of Canada's Drag Race. She won the Snatch Game challenge for her impersonation of Manny Pacquiao.

In September 2024, Melinda Verga was announced as participating in the second season of The Traitors Canada.

== Personal life ==
Derrada is of Filipino origin, and is based in Edmonton, Alberta. He was born in the Philippines and moved to Canada at age 16, and later moved to Toronto to attend fashion school. He started performing in drag in 2015, at the age of 37, and made his debut at Evolution Wonderlounge in Edmonton. Derrada uses the pronouns he/him out of drag, and has no preferred gender pronouns when in drag. He is married to Scott Green.

== Filmography ==
=== Television ===
Year	Title	Role	Notes	Ref
2023–2024	Canada's Drag Race (season 4)	Contestant	5th place	
2024	The Traitors Canada (season 2)	Contestant	Banished; 6 episodes	
2026	RuPaul's Drag Race: UK vs. the World (series 3)	Contestant	10th place	

=== Web series ===
Year	Title	Role	Notes	Ref
2024	Bring Back My Girls	Herself	Season 4, episode 4	
2025	Binge Queens: Drag Race Philippines: Slaysian Royale	Herself	Host	
