= The Traitors Canada season 3 =

The Traitors Canada
- Season 3
- Promotional poster
- Presented by: Karine Vanasse
- No. of contestants: 22
- Winners: Dom Gabriel; Hollywood Jade
- Runner-up: Lisette Sumbu
- Location: The Manoir Rouville-Campbell, Montérégie région
- No. of episodes: 10

Release
- Original network: CTV
- Original release: October 21 – December 16, 2025

Season chronology
- ← Previous; Season 2 Next → Season 4

The third season of the Canadian television series The Traitors Canada premiered on CTV on October 21, 2025, with episodes being released weekly. The season was won by Dom Gabriel and Hollywood Jade as Faithfuls, with Lisette Sumbu placing as a runner-up, also as a faithful.

== Production ==
Similar to the previous seasons, primary filming takes place at The Manoir Rouville-Campbell, adjacent to Mont-Saint-Hilaire in the Montérégie région

== Format ==
The contestants arrived at the castle and are referred to as the "Faithful." Among them are the "Traitors," a group of contestants secretly selected by the host, Karine Vanasse. Most nights, the Traitors would decide who to "murder," and that same contestant would leave the game. After the end of each day, where the contestants participated in various challenges to add money to the prize fund, they would participate in the Round Table, where they must decide who to banish from the game, trying to identify the Traitor.

If all the remaining players are Faithful, then the prize money is divided evenly among them. However, if any Traitors remain, they win the entire pot.

Unlike previous seasons, this season added that if the players banished a traitor before the final day, they would add $10,000 to the pot.

== Contestants ==
Similar to the first and second seasons, the cast consists of half reality TV stars and notable personalities and half civilian contestants. In a minor twist, Cagla and Meredith Baktiroglu had a pre-existing relationship as they were married before competing in the series.

List of The Traitors contestants
Contestant	Age	From	Occupation/Original Series	Affiliation	Finish
Ty McDonald	31	Toronto, Ontario	Big Brother Canada 11	Faithful	Murdered (Episode 2)
Curtis Steeksma	24	Langley, British Columbia	Sales director	Faithful	Banished (Episode 2)
Mackenzie Heck	26	Fort McMurray, Alberta	Power Engineer	Faithful	Murdered (Episode 3)
Azfir Balenciaga	35	Vancouver, British Columbia	Event planner	Faithful	Banished (Episode 3)
Kitten Kaboodle	59	Toronto, Ontario	Canada's Drag Race 4	Faithful	Murdered (Episode 4)
Kevin Jacobs	31	Toronto, Ontario	Big Brother Canada 10	Traitor	Banished (Episode 4)
Thompson Clarke	33	Toronto, Ontario	Global brand manager	Faithful	Murdered (Episode 5)
Omar Zaheer	34	Whitby, Ontario	Survivor 42	Faithful	Banished (Episode 5)
Ria Rollins	27	Ottawa, Ontario	Office administrator	Traitor (Note: Ria was recruited as a Traitor in Episode 6.)	Banished (Episode 6)
Shaughnessy O'Driscoll	24	Witless Bay, Newfoundland and Labrador	Account management team lead	Faithful	Murdered (Episode 7)
Jericho Dacillo	34	Toronto, Ontario	Banking advisor	Faithful	Banished (Episode 7)
Natalie Lam	35	Winnipeg, Manitoba	Fleet dispatcher	Faithful	Murdered (Episode 8)
Venus Vafa	26	Toronto, Ontario	Survivor 46	Traitor (Note: Venus was recruited as a Traitor in Episode 2.)	Banished (Episode 8)
Kara Alloway	55	Toronto, Ontario	The Real Housewives of Toronto	Faithful	Murdered (Episode 9)
Sarah Nicole Landry	40	Guelph, Ontario	Podcaster & content creator	Faithful	Banished (Episode 9)
Jamal Alexander	35	Toronto, Ontario	Correctional supervisor	Faithful	Murdered (Episode 10)
Meredith Baktiroglu	38	Hamilton, Ontario	Diagnostic medical sonographer	Faithful	Banished (Episode 10)
Cagla Baktiroglu	35	Hamilton, Ontario	Benefits analyst	Traitor (Note: Cagla was recruited as a Traitor in Episode 9)	Banished (Episode 10)
Coco Belliveau	33	Montreal, Quebec	Big Brother Célébrités 3	Traitor	Banished (Episode 10)
Lisette Sumbu	23	Amherst, Nova Scotia	Waitress	Faithful	Banished (Episode 10)
Dom Gabriel	32	Pickering, Ontario	The Mole 6	Faithful	Winner (Episode 10)
Hollywood Jade	41	Toronto, Ontario	Dancer & Choreographer	Faithful	Winner (Episode 10)

== Episodes ==
The Traitors Canada season 3 episodes
No. overall	No. in season	Title	Original release date
21	1	"Overconfidence is a Curse"	October 21, 2025
22	2	"Revenge"	October 28, 2025
23	3	"Save Me Please"	November 4, 2025
24	4	"It's Time"	November 11, 2025
25	5	"A Heavy Legacy"	November 18, 2025
26	6	"The Trap"	November 25, 2025
27	7	"A Cursed Shield"	December 2, 2025
28	8	"Choosing Your Words"	December 9, 2025
29	9	"Blackmail"	December 16, 2025
30	10	"Where It All Ends.."	December 16, 2025

== Elimination history ==
Key
The contestant was a Faithful
The contestant was a Traitor

Episode	1	2		3	4	5	6	7	8		9				10		
Traitor's Decision	Ty; Venus	Ty	Venus	Jericho; Mackenzie; Natalie; Thompson	Kitten	Thompson (Note: In Episode 4, the unshielded players were blindfolded and brought to a Midnight Ceremony, where the Traitors would silently pick one person to either Murder or Recruit. They selected Thompson, who could plead his case to the Traitors as to why he should join them. The Traitors ultimately chose to murder Thompson.)	Ria	Shaughnessy	Natalie (Note: After the Round Table in Episode 7, the Traitors were tasked to murder someone in plain sight, by passing them a cursed shield.)		~~Dom~~; Cagla		Kara		Jamal		None
Traitor's Decision	Invite (Note: In Episode 1, the two chosen Traitors were tasked to find each other and invite two Faithfuls to the caping ceremony. The Traitors invited Ty & Venus. Unbeknownst to them, one Faithful would be recruited as a Traitor while the other Faithful would be the first murdered player. The Traitors chose Venus to join them as a Traitor and Ty to murder.These decisions were revealed in Episode 2)	Murder	Recruit	Shortlist (Note: The Traitors nominated four players as potential murder victims by writing their names on a shortlist. Of these four players, Mackenzie was not rescued during the challenge and was murdered.)	Murder		Seduce (Note: Instead of choosing to murder a player, the Traitors decided to offer Ria the opportunity to become a Traitor. She accepted their offer.)	Murder			Blackmail (Note: Coco was given the ability to Blackmail one faithful to join The Traitors, if they declined the offer, they would be murdered. She chose Dom to blackmail. He declined her offer. As Dom had a shield, he could remain in the game. Coco then chose to blackmail Cagla. They accepted her offer.)		Murder				None
Immune	Azfir; Cagla; Hollywood; Jericho; Kevin; Mackenzie; Thompson	Azfir; Jamal; Kara; Meredith; Shaughnessy; Venus		Jericho; Natalie; Thompson	Kara; Kevin; Meredith; Omar; Venus	Hollywood; Sarah Nicole; Shaughnessy	Jericho	Cagla; Coco; Dom	Dom; Hollywood		Hollywood				None		None
Banishment	None	Curtis		Azfir	Kevin	Omar	Ria	Jericho	Tie (Note: The first round of voting resulted in a tie. Per the rules, a second vote was held where the players involved in the tie would not vote and the remaining players could only vote for those who tied.) (Note: Due to Kara losing out during the mission, she was not allowed to speak at the round table.)	Venus	Tie		Sarah Nicole		Tie	Meredith	Cagla
Vote	None	16–2–1–1–1		10–5–2–1–1	6–3–3–1– 1–1–1–1	8–5–1–1	11–2–1	9–2–1	5–5	6–2	3–3–2–1		4–3		3–3	3–1	4–1
Dom	No; Vote	Curtis		Azfir	Coco	Coco	Ria	Jericho	Meredith	Meredith	Sarah Nicole		Sarah Nicole		Meredith	No; Vote	Cagla
Hollywood	No; Vote	Cagla		Azfir	Kevin	Omar	Ria	Jericho	Venus	Venus	Sarah Nicole		Sarah Nicole		Meredith	Meredith	Cagla
Lisette	No; Vote	Meredith		Cagla	Cagla	Cagla	Ria	Meredith	Meredith	Venus	Meredith		No; Vote		Meredith	Meredith	Cagla
Coco	No; Vote	Curtis		Azfir	Omar	Omar	Ria	Jericho	Meredith	Venus	Sarah Nicole		Sarah Nicole		Dom	Meredith	Cagla
Cagla	No; Vote	Curtis		Azfir	Lisette	Omar	Ria	Jericho	Venus	Venus	Lisette	Lisette (Note: Hollywood gifted the Dagger to Cagla, meaning their vote was doubled.)	Lisette	Lisette	Dom	Dom	Lisette
Meredith	No; Vote	Curtis		Lisette	Shaughnessy	Omar	Ria	Jericho	Venus	No; Vote	Lisette		Lisette		Dom	No; Vote	Banished (Episode 10)
Jamal	No; Vote	Curtis		Cagla	Kevin	Omar	Kara	Kara	Meredith	Meredith	Meredith		Sarah Nicole		Murdered (Episode 10)		
Sarah Nicole	No; Vote	Curtis		Azfir	Kevin	Coco	Ria	Jericho	Venus	Venus	Jamal		No; Vote		Banished (Episode 9)		
Kara	No; Vote	Curtis		Hollywood	Kevin	Coco	Ria	Jericho	Venus	Venus	Murdered (Episode 9)						
Venus	No; Vote	Curtis		Azfir	Shaughnessy	Coco	Ria	Jericho	Meredith	No; Vote	Banished (Episode 8)						
Natalie	No; Vote	Azfir		Shaughnessy	Shaughnessy	Omar	Ria	Jericho	Murdered (Episode 8)								
Jericho	No; Vote	Curtis		Cagla	Kevin	Omar	Coco	Meredith	Banished (Episode 7)								
Shaughnessy	No; Vote	Meredith		Azfir	Kevin	Omar	Ria	Murdered (Episode 7)									
Ria	No; Vote	Curtis		Lisette	Thompson	Dom	Coco	Banished (Episode 6)									
Omar	No; Vote	Curtis		Azfir	Coco	Coco	Banished (Episode 5)										
Thompson	No; Vote	Curtis		Azfir	Ria	Murdered (Episode 5)											
Kevin	No; Vote	Curtis		Azfir	Coco	Banished (Episode 4)											
Kitten	No; Vote	Curtis		Cagla	Murdered (Episode 4)												
Azfir	No; Vote	Curtis		Cagla	Banished (Episode 3)												
Mackenzie	No; Vote	Curtis		Murdered (Episode 3)													
Curtis	No; Vote	Dom		Banished (Episode 2)													
Ty	No; Vote	Murdered (Episode 2)															

=== End game ===
Episode	10				
Decision	Banish	Coco	Banish	Lisette	Game Over; Faithfuls Win
Vote	3–1	2–1–1	3–0	2–1	Game Over; Faithfuls Win
Dom	Banish	Coco	Banish	Lisette	Winners
Hollywood	Banish	Lisette	Banish	Lisette	Winners
Lisette	Banish	Coco	Banish	Hollywood	Banished
Coco	End Game	Hollywood	Banished		

== Missions ==
Episode	Mission Description	Money Available	Money Earned	Total Pot	Shield Winner
1	The players are split into multiple teams depending on the players personality traits. Each team has to solve a riddle before rowing their boat to a barge that has chests of gold. From solving the riddle, it will have them unlock the chest. To return to shore, they must leave a player behind. The ones left behind can be murdered, whereas the ones who reach the shore, are shielded.	$10,000	$4,000	$4,000	Azfir
1	The players are split into multiple teams depending on the players personality traits. Each team has to solve a riddle before rowing their boat to a barge that has chests of gold. From solving the riddle, it will have them unlock the chest. To return to shore, they must leave a player behind. The ones left behind can be murdered, whereas the ones who reach the shore, are shielded.	$10,000	$4,000	$4,000	Cagla
1	The players are split into multiple teams depending on the players personality traits. Each team has to solve a riddle before rowing their boat to a barge that has chests of gold. From solving the riddle, it will have them unlock the chest. To return to shore, they must leave a player behind. The ones left behind can be murdered, whereas the ones who reach the shore, are shielded.	$10,000	$4,000	$4,000	Hollywood
1	The players are split into multiple teams depending on the players personality traits. Each team has to solve a riddle before rowing their boat to a barge that has chests of gold. From solving the riddle, it will have them unlock the chest. To return to shore, they must leave a player behind. The ones left behind can be murdered, whereas the ones who reach the shore, are shielded.	$10,000	$4,000	$4,000	Jericho
1	The players are split into multiple teams depending on the players personality traits. Each team has to solve a riddle before rowing their boat to a barge that has chests of gold. From solving the riddle, it will have them unlock the chest. To return to shore, they must leave a player behind. The ones left behind can be murdered, whereas the ones who reach the shore, are shielded.	$10,000	$4,000	$4,000	Kevin
1	The players are split into multiple teams depending on the players personality traits. Each team has to solve a riddle before rowing their boat to a barge that has chests of gold. From solving the riddle, it will have them unlock the chest. To return to shore, they must leave a player behind. The ones left behind can be murdered, whereas the ones who reach the shore, are shielded.	$10,000	$4,000	$4,000	Mackenzie
1	The players are split into multiple teams depending on the players personality traits. Each team has to solve a riddle before rowing their boat to a barge that has chests of gold. From solving the riddle, it will have them unlock the chest. To return to shore, they must leave a player behind. The ones left behind can be murdered, whereas the ones who reach the shore, are shielded.	$10,000	$4,000	$4,000	Thompson
2	All but one player are paired off with one of each pair blindfolded and told to navigate through the woods. After collecting bags of money, each pair is sent to a bridge with one standing on one side and the other standing on the other. Each pair has to choose who of them would have a shield, and if both choose the same, they are safe. However if they don't agree, Karine sets the bridge alight and the player has to rush off into the lake to beat the flame.	$10,000	$9,600	$13,600	Azfir
2	All but one player are paired off with one of each pair blindfolded and told to navigate through the woods. After collecting bags of money, each pair is sent to a bridge with one standing on one side and the other standing on the other. Each pair has to choose who of them would have a shield, and if both choose the same, they are safe. However if they don't agree, Karine sets the bridge alight and the player has to rush off into the lake to beat the flame.	$10,000	$9,600	$13,600	Jamal
2	All but one player are paired off with one of each pair blindfolded and told to navigate through the woods. After collecting bags of money, each pair is sent to a bridge with one standing on one side and the other standing on the other. Each pair has to choose who of them would have a shield, and if both choose the same, they are safe. However if they don't agree, Karine sets the bridge alight and the player has to rush off into the lake to beat the flame.	$10,000	$9,600	$13,600	Kara
2	All but one player are paired off with one of each pair blindfolded and told to navigate through the woods. After collecting bags of money, each pair is sent to a bridge with one standing on one side and the other standing on the other. Each pair has to choose who of them would have a shield, and if both choose the same, they are safe. However if they don't agree, Karine sets the bridge alight and the player has to rush off into the lake to beat the flame.	$10,000	$9,600	$13,600	Meredith
2	All but one player are paired off with one of each pair blindfolded and told to navigate through the woods. After collecting bags of money, each pair is sent to a bridge with one standing on one side and the other standing on the other. Each pair has to choose who of them would have a shield, and if both choose the same, they are safe. However if they don't agree, Karine sets the bridge alight and the player has to rush off into the lake to beat the flame.	$10,000	$9,600	$13,600	Shaughnessy
2	All but one player are paired off with one of each pair blindfolded and told to navigate through the woods. After collecting bags of money, each pair is sent to a bridge with one standing on one side and the other standing on the other. Each pair has to choose who of them would have a shield, and if both choose the same, they are safe. However if they don't agree, Karine sets the bridge alight and the player has to rush off into the lake to beat the flame.	$10,000	$9,600	$13,600	Venus
3	The players up for death row are 16 ft in the ground. Everyone else has to collect rungs to help them make a ladder. Whoever doesn't accomplish this in 20 minutes, is the one murdered.	$10,000	$7,800	$21,400	Jericho
3	The players up for death row are 16 ft in the ground. Everyone else has to collect rungs to help them make a ladder. Whoever doesn't accomplish this in 20 minutes, is the one murdered.	$10,000	$7,800	$21,400	Natalie
3	The players up for death row are 16 ft in the ground. Everyone else has to collect rungs to help them make a ladder. Whoever doesn't accomplish this in 20 minutes, is the one murdered.	$10,000	$7,800	$21,400	Thompson
4	The players are split into two teams: white and black, similarly to chess pieces. They are playing as chess pawns with facts or fictions with the team guessing whether its true or false.		$11,000	$22,400	Kara
4	The players are split into two teams: white and black, similarly to chess pieces. They are playing as chess pawns with facts or fictions with the team guessing whether its true or false.		$11,000	$22,400	Kevin
4	The players are split into two teams: white and black, similarly to chess pieces. They are playing as chess pawns with facts or fictions with the team guessing whether its true or false.		$11,000	$22,400	Meredith
4	The players are split into two teams: white and black, similarly to chess pieces. They are playing as chess pawns with facts or fictions with the team guessing whether its true or false.		$11,000	$22,400	Omar
4	The players are split into two teams: white and black, similarly to chess pieces. They are playing as chess pawns with facts or fictions with the team guessing whether its true or false.		$11,000	$22,400	Venus
5	The players are taken to a church where they are given riddles from "The Book of Traitors". They have to guess the right answer to the riddle. If the answer is correct, they can choose who of 3 players have the shield. If they got it wrong, the player is eliminated from the challenge.		$6,000	$38,400 (Note: $10,000 added due to banishing a traitor at the banishment after the previous mission.)	Hollywood
5	The players are taken to a church where they are given riddles from "The Book of Traitors". They have to guess the right answer to the riddle. If the answer is correct, they can choose who of 3 players have the shield. If they got it wrong, the player is eliminated from the challenge.		$6,000	$38,400	Sarah Nicole
5	The players are taken to a church where they are given riddles from "The Book of Traitors". They have to guess the right answer to the riddle. If the answer is correct, they can choose who of 3 players have the shield. If they got it wrong, the player is eliminated from the challenge.		$6,000	$38,400	Shaughnessy
6	Players are split up into teams. One team goes into an abandoned room full of dolls that are dirty and "duplicates" of dolls in another room in the manor. The players in the manor are the four most "trustworthy" players. The players outside of the manor have 30 seconds to describe the doll to others who have to find the matching doll in a room full of dolls. If all four dolls are correct, the Traitors would not be able to Murder that night. When checking to figure out if its the right doll, Karine gives them the option to switch the doll for a wrong doll in order to get a shield. Each correct doll earns $2,500 to the pot. Another team is looking for pouches of gold.	$10,000	$5,000	$43,400	Jericho
7	The players are split into two teams to find gold around the manor in 3 minutes. The players are chained together at the one wrist and one ankle. When they return with gold coins equaling $500, they have to answer a question that the traitors had answered. For every correct answer, they receive the gold. For every incorrect answer, they lose that gold. They can also find a shield. Extra Shield challenge: Players must pass on the shield and can't keep their original shield by midnight.		$6,000	$59,400 (Note: $10,000 added due to banishing a traitor at the banishment after the previous mission.)	Coco
7	The players are split into two teams to find gold around the manor in 3 minutes. The players are chained together at the one wrist and one ankle. When they return with gold coins equaling $500, they have to answer a question that the traitors had answered. For every correct answer, they receive the gold. For every incorrect answer, they lose that gold. They can also find a shield. Extra Shield challenge: Players must pass on the shield and can't keep their original shield by midnight.		$6,000	$59,400	Cagla
7	The players are split into two teams to find gold around the manor in 3 minutes. The players are chained together at the one wrist and one ankle. When they return with gold coins equaling $500, they have to answer a question that the traitors had answered. For every correct answer, they receive the gold. For every incorrect answer, they lose that gold. They can also find a shield. Extra Shield challenge: Players must pass on the shield and can't keep their original shield by midnight.		$6,000	$59,400	Dom
8	The players are taken to a scenic part on the property and asked to decide who is the most influential players are: Kara, Hollywood, and Dom are picked and separated from the others as they are then hung up like hangman. The other players have to play hangman with the other players. If one of the players hung-up are dropped too low, they would be gagged at the upcoming round table, meaning they would not be allowed to speak. Each saved player is worth $3,333. In the end, Kara is gagged for the round table.	$9,999	$6,700 (Note: Karine rounded $6,666 to $6,700.)	$66,100	Hollywood
8		$9,999	$6,700	$66,100	Dom
9	The players are kidnapped with black bags being put over their heads. When the bags are removed, they learned that they are chained together with magnets in their hands. The magnets would allow them to grab a bag to unlock a random player. They then have to stab a straw voodoo doll until one is left. There are 10 minutes to complete the challenge and every minute it takes $1,000 is lost. The winner the mission could choose between either a Dagger (giving them a double vote at the next Banishment) or a Shield (granting them immunity from the final Murder). However they can't hold onto both so have the ability to give the one they didn't choose to one of three contestants they invited to have a one-on-one meeting with. Hollywood met with Sarah Nicole, Dom and Cagla.	$10,000	$1,000	$77,100	Hollywood
10	The players have to work together to solve puzzles at multiple tables. They have 30 minutes to solve all the tables' puzzles. If they manage to solve the puzzle, they will receive a dagger which would take a player out of the rest of the round.		$16,000	$93,100	No Shield on offer
