= Van Goth =

Canadian drag performer (born 1997)

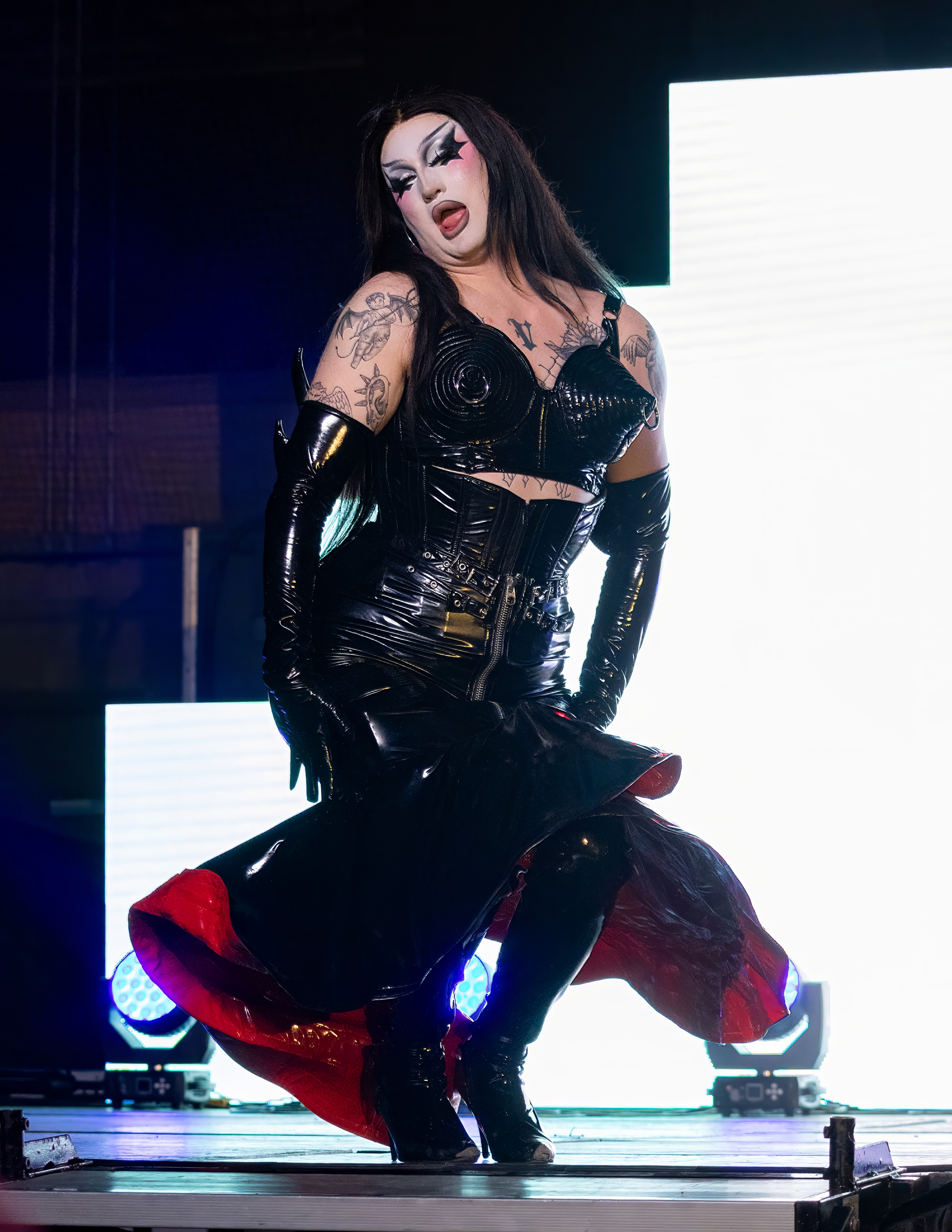
- Van Goth performing in 2025
- Born: Blake Harris; December 18, 1997 (age 28); Richmond Hill, Ontario, Canada
- Occupation: Drag performer
- Television: Canada's Drag Race (season 6)

Van Goth is the stage name of Blake Harris (born December 18, 1997), a Canadian drag performer who won the sixth season of Canada's Drag Race. In 2026 Van Goth was announced as a cast member of the fourth season of The Traitors Canada alongside season 2 winner Icesis Couture, marking the first time in Traitors history that 2 drag queens competed on the same season.

== Early life and career ==
Blake Harris was born and raised in Richmond Hill, Ontario. He attended St. Elizabeth Catholic High School's Regional Arts Program with a focus in acting, and then Toronto Metropolitan University with a major in fashion design. He began performing in drag at age 20 and won Scarlett Bobo's Absolut Empire's Ball in 2022.

During his time on Canada's Drag Race, Van Goth won multiple challenges, including the first of the season.

In June 2026, she was cohost of Toronto's annual AIDS Candlelight Vigil. In September, he is slated to appear in the fourth season of The Traitors Canada.

== Personal life ==
Harris is based in Toronto. He studied fashion.

He is of partial Acadian ancestry, with roots in Clare, Nova Scotia. During his time on Canada's Drag Race, Harris revealed he is HIV-positive. Harris is a former rugby player who has described Van Goth as a "showgirl rockstar".

== Filmography ==
=== Television ===
Year	Title	Role	Notes
2025–26	Canada's Drag Race	Contestant	Season 6, 9 episodes (Winner)
2026	The Traitors Canada	Contestant	Season 4

== See also ==
- List of drag queens
- List of people from Toronto
