= Gurleen Maan =

Canadian farmer

Gurleen Maan is a Canadian farmer who has appeared on several Canadian unscripted television shows.

== Early life ==
Gurleen Maan is one of four children born to parents Kris and Devinder Maan. She grew up on the family farm in Abbotsford, British Columbia.

== Career ==
Maan and her family own and operate Maan Farms in Abbotsford, British Columbia. Mann does creative and marketing for the farm.

=== Television ===
In 2022, she was selected to participate in the CTV unscripted reality series, Farming For Love, as one of six single farmers. The season aired in 2023. Mann subsequently competed on the reality competition show, The Traitors Canada. She was the runner up, making it to the end with "traitor", Mike. Maan and Kevin Martin competed as a team on season 10 of The Amazing Race Canada. They were eliminated in the semi-finals, finishing their leg of the race less than five minutes after the second-to-last team.

== Personal life ==
On Farming for Love, Maan chose Tai Chatur, but their relationship did not last beyond the show. After meeting on The Traitors, Maan began dating Kevin Martin, their relationship did not last long after filming wrapped.
