= Lauren Chan =

Canadian model and entrepreneur (born 1990)

- Born: August 9, 1990 (age 36); Brantford, Ontario, Canada
- Education: University of Western Ontario (BA)
- Occupations: Model; editor; entrepreneur
- Years active: 2012–present
- Known for: The Traitors Canada; Ford Models
- Spouse: Hayley Kosan (m. 2025)

Lauren Chan (born August 9, 1990) is a Canadian model, editor and entrepreneur. She is the founder of the plus-size clothing brand Henning.

== Early life and education ==
Originally from Brantford, Ontario, Chan was born to a Chinese father and Armenian mother. She attended the University of Western Ontario with aspirations of playing basketball. After her appendix ruptured, she took an interest in fashion. She graduated in 2012 with a Bachelor of Arts in sociology.

== Career ==
After graduation, Chan moved to New York City to pursue a career as a plus-size model with Ford Models and as a fashion writer. Three years after moving to New York, when she was 25, she stepped away from modeling and became the associate fashion news editor for Glamour in 2015. In addition to covering the womenswear market, Chan focused on size-inclusion via her print column and digital vertical called "Style Your Size", the Glamour x Lane Bryant clothing line which she co-designed, and broadcast appearances on Good Morning America and Today—still, she struggled to find clothes in plus sizes to wear to work. As a result, Chan left her job in 2018 to create Henning, a plus-size clothing brand, and to return to modeling. Ranging from size 12-24, the company's business model was based on made-on-demand, slow fashion. In April 2023, Henning was acquired by Universal Standard.

In 2018 the American Society of Magazine Editors awarded Chan the ASME Next Award for Journalists Under 30. In 2019, Chan was named one of Chatelaine magazine's Women of the Year. That same year, she was recognized by Toronto Life magazine as one of the city's best dressed. In 2021, she was nominated for the Canadian Arts and Fashion Award for Digital Fashion Creator of the Year. In 2023, she won the Canadian Arts and Fashion Award for Model of the Year. That year, she also appeared on Toronto Life's list of the 50 most influential Torontonians and Marie Claire's Power List.

In 2023, Chan appeared in the Sports Illustrated Swimsuit Issue. She was the first queer plus-size Sports Illustrated rookie. In 2025 she appeared solo on a Sports Illustrated Swimsuit Issue cover, making her the first out lesbian to do so. Same year, Henning was acquired by Universal Standard.

In 2024 Chan appeared on the second season of The Traitors Canada.

In May 2026, Chan launched a Pride-themed collection with Joe Fresh, featuring colorways inspired by the top of the progress pride flag.

== Activism ==
Chan has been an ambassador for the National Eating Disorders Association since 2019. She is also a member of the advisory board for Model Alliance, an advocacy group for models. In 2024, she was honored by Manhattan Borough President Mark Levine and New York State Assembly member Grace Lee for her leadership in New York City's Chinese-American community and work on size inclusion in the fashion industry.

== Personal life ==
Chan publicly announced her divorce from her husband on Valentine's Day 2023. Later that year, in a Sports Illustrated Swimsuit Issue article, Chan came out as a lesbian. In 2024, she announced her relationship with film director Hayley Kosan. The couple got engaged in March 2025, and they married in October 2025.
