= Tranna Wintour =

Canadian stand-up comedian

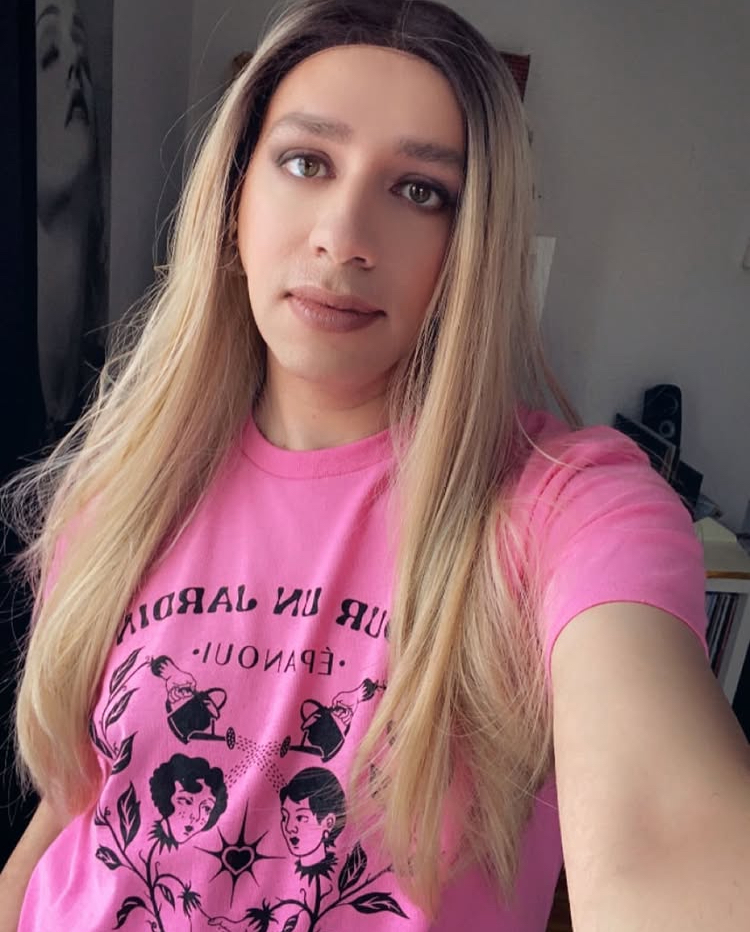
- Wintour in 2025
- Education: Concordia University
- Occupations: Comedian; television personality
- Years active: 2013–present
- Known for: Big Brother Célébrités; The Traitors Canada

Tranna Wintour is a Canadian stand-up comedian from Montreal, Quebec, best known for her reality television appearances in the second season of Big Brother Célébrités and the second season of The Traitors Canada.

== Biography ==
A graduate of Concordia University, she began performing stand-up and musical cabaret shows in Montreal in 2013. In 2016, she and collaborator Thomas Leblanc launched Saint Céline, a cabaret show devoted to Céline Dion. It was staged again in 2017 and 2018 due to its popularity. In 2019, Wintour and Leblanc launched the podcast Chosen Family.

In 2020, during the COVID-19 pandemic she participated in Saint-Jeanne, an LGBTQ-inclusive Saint-Jean-Baptiste Day livestream coordinated by singer-songwriter Safia Nolin, alongside Kiara, Karl Hardy, Gabrielle Tremblay, Annie Sama (Apigeon), Backxwash, FLORAA, Matante Alex and Gisèle Lullaby. In 2020 she released her debut musical album Safe From Your Affection, comprising original and cover songs.

In 2022 she appeared in Big Brother Célébrités. Although fluently bilingual she was not well-known to Quebec's francophone audiences, and was hailed as a breakout star of the show. Later in the year she performed in the stand-up comedy series Comedy Night with Rick Mercer.

She appeared on The Traitors Canada in 2024, finishing the season as the runner-up.

== Filmography ==
| Year | Title | Role | Notes | Ref |
|---|---|---|---|---|
| 2022 | Big Brother Célébrités | Contestant | Evicted; Day 85; season 2 | |
| 2024 | The Traitors Canada | Contestant | Runner-up; season 2 (10 episodes) | |
| 2026 | Roast Battle Canada | Contestant | Roast vs Sam Sferrazza | |

== Discography ==
=== Studio albums ===
- Safe From Your Affection (Oscar St. Records, March 31, 2020)
