= Thomas Edmund Campbell =

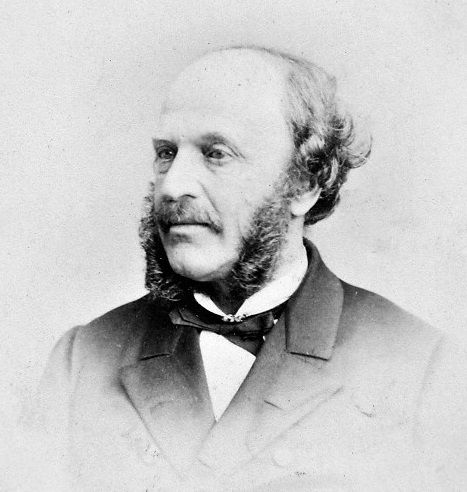
Major Thomas Edmund Campbell, 1864

Major Thomas Edmund Campbell (1809 – 1872) C.B., came to Canada East as a British military officer, where he became a political figure and seigneur who did much to develop Rouville, Quebec. He built Manoir Rouville-Campbell, and was a prominent member of the Montreal Hunt.

== Early life ==
He was born at Bedford Square, London, January 4, 1809. He grew up in an affluent family, the fifth of the six children born to Duncan Campbell (d.1815), who had made a fortune in the West Indies, and Harriet (d.1817), daughter of Robert Young of Auchenshcoch. He was the grandson of Alexander Campbell (1710-1760), 11th Laird of Inverawe, Argyll, descended from Archibald Campbell of Inverawe. His brother, Colonel James Campbell, built New Inverawe, today known as Ardanaiseig Hotel. He was a brother-in-law of Sir Alexander Spearman 1st Bt., of Hanwell, and his sister-in-law was a niece of Lt.-General Sir James Campbell, 1st Bt., of Inverneill. In 1832, he graduated from the Royal Military Academy Sandhurst and was appointed Captain of the Royal Scots and aide-de-camp to Lieutenant-General Campbell. He transferred to the 1st The Royal Dragoons and then joined the 7th Queen's Own Hussars, serving in the Near East.

== Canada ==
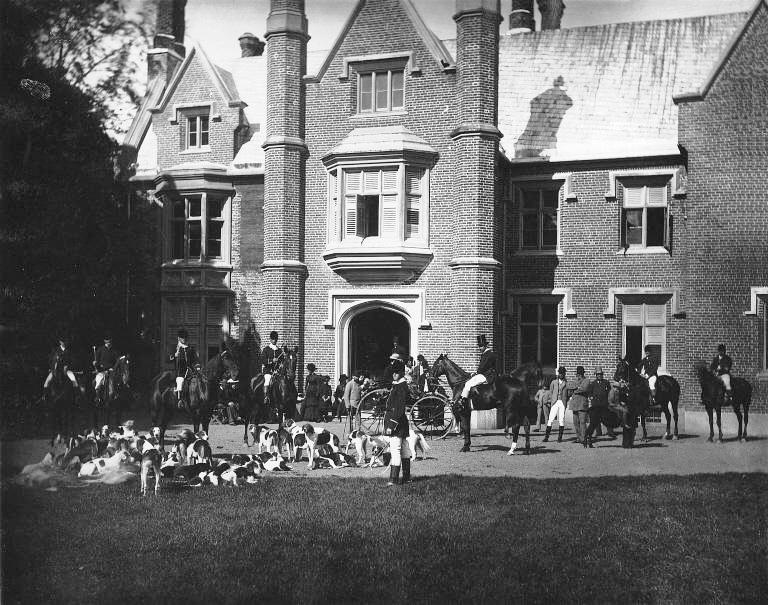
The Montreal Hunt in front of Campbell's home, Manoir Rouville, Quebec

He came to Lower Canada during the Lower Canada Rebellion and he led a group of Mohawks against the Patriote forces at Châteauguay. He stopped pillaging by other loyalist forces afterwards and arrested the ringleaders who had instigated it. He became Governor Charles Edward Poulett Thomson's military secretary and aide-de-camp in 1838. As such, he helped structure the first election held in the Province of Canada in 1841 to aid candidates favoured by the Governor.

In 1841, he married Henriette-Julie, the daughter of seigneur Michel-Louis Juchereau Duchesnay and his wife, daughter of Ignace-Michel-Louis-Antoine d'Irumberry de Salaberry. Through his wife, Campbell inherited the seigneury of Rouville in 1844. Their youngest son married one of the daughters of Sir Hugh Allan, of Montreal.

Campbell settled at Saint-Hilaire in 1846 and set up a model farm there. A year later, he became civil secretary for the new governor, Lord Elgin and superintendent-general of Indian affairs. He resigned this post when the capital was moved to Toronto in 1849. In 1858, he was elected to the Legislative Assembly of the Province of Canada for Rouville and generally voted with the Conservatives. After he was defeated in 1861, Campbell retired from politics.

He was a director of the Bank of Montreal and the Grand Trunk Railway. He was a member of a commission set up in 1862 with the aim of improving civil defence in the province. Campbell continued to supervise the operation of the seigneury of Rouville until his death in 1872. Unlike many seigneurs of English origin, Campbell conducted the business of the seigneury in French.
