= Farming for Love =

Canadian television series

- Genre: Reality competition; Dating game show
- Presented by: Sabrina Jalees
- Country of origin: Canada
- Original language: English
- No. of seasons: 2
- No. of episodes: 10

Production
- Production location: British Columbia
- Running time: 60 minutes
- Production company: Lark Productions

Original release
- Network: CTV
- Release: May 28, 2023 – July 31, 2024

Farming for Love is a Canadian reality dating show that premiered on CTV on May 28, 2023. An adaptation of the international Farmer Wants a Wife franchise, the series focuses on several Canadian farmers who are seeking relationships.

== Format ==
The series is hosted by Sabrina Jalees. The series title was changed from the original franchise so that it would be open not only to male farmers seeking wives, but to female or LGBT farmers seeking their desired partners as well.

== Season 1 ==
The cast, with 5 farmers and 31 contestants, was announced on May 16, 2023. The first season's farmers were all from British Columbia. In episode 6, all farmers were given the opportunity of either meeting a new date, or taking one of their current contestants on a date with them.

=== Farmer Ashleigh ===
Ashleigh Tuhkala is a 33-year-old horse rancher and trainer from Gibsons. In episode 6, she chose to eliminate all of her dates. She was later surprised with a mystery date, which she opted to choose as the winner.

=== Farmer Charley ===
Charley Cottrill is a 25-year-old vineyard operator from Keremeos.

Charley's contestants
Name	Age	Location	Occupation
Adrienne	25	Kamloops, British Columbia	Veterinary technician
Chelane	25	Red Deer, Alberta	Support worker
Angelina	24	Burnaby, British Columbia	ESL teacher
Emily-May (Note: Emily-May was introduced in episode 6.)	27	Burnaby, British Columbia	Butcher
Maxine	23	Mission, British Columbia	Server
Samantha	24	Oshawa, Ontario	Bartender
Laura	29	Calgary, Alberta	Teacher
Samantha	24	Penticton, British Columbia	Building developer

=== Farmer Dave ===
Dave Semmelink is a 32-year-old livestock and grain farmer from the Comox Valley.

Dave's contestants
Name	Age	Location	Occupation
Hillary	31	Whitehorse, Yukon Territory	Public servant
Hope	30	Victoria, British Columbia	Entrepreneur
Ursula (Note: Ursula was introduced in episode 6.)	29	Beaverton, Ontario	Sunflower farmer
Kayley	32	Peterborough, Ontario	Antique shop owner
Lori	35	Nanaimo, British Columbia	Photographer
Amanda	28	Vancouver, British Columbia	HR administrator
Melissa	29	Fergus, Ontario	Occupational health nurse

=== Farmer Doug ===
Doug Groenendijk is a 25-year-old dairy farmer from Chemainus.

Doug's contestants
Name	Age	Location	Occupation
Meghan	23	Cobden, Ontario	Dairy researcher
MacKenzie	24	Fredericton, New Brunswick	HR advisor
Rachel	25	Saint John, New Brunswick	Financial analyst
Kiana (Note: Kiana was introduced in episode 6, but was not invited back to the farm)	23	Windsor, Ontario	Educational assistant
Amy	25	Pitt Meadows, British Columbia	Office manager
Abbie	25	Saint John, New Brunswick	Real estate investor
Bailey	24	Carman, Manitoba	Beekeeper
Kayla	28	Saskatoon, Saskatchewan	Brand marketing manager

=== Farmer Gurleen ===
Gurleen Maan is a 34-year-old berry farmer from Abbotsford.

Gurleen's contestants
Name	Age	Location	Occupation
Tai	28	Calgary, Alberta	Registered provisional psychologist
Joshua	36	Grand Manan Island, New Brunswick	Lobster fisherman
Craig	36	Langley, British Columbia	Claims adjuster
Nick	29	Mississauga, Ontario	Bartender
Raj	49	Nanaimo, British Columbia	Photographer
Manny	35	Brampton, Ontario	Real estate investor

== Season 2 ==
Season 2 of Farming for Love was filmed in the fall of 2023 premiered on CTV on May 29 2024.

Four farmers were featured: Erin, Kirkland, Josh and Mischa.

=== Farmer Erin ===
Erin Harris is a 34 year old second-generation female soil-to-shelf dairy farmer from Creston B.C..

Erin's contestants

Name	Age	Location	Occupation
Tieren	27	Bible Hill, Nova Scotia	Professional Wrestler
Jared	25	Creston, British Columbia	Farming Entrepreneur
William	31	Toronto, Ontario	Logger & Bartender
Ryan	36	Chilliwack, British Columbia	Business Owner
Lukas	31	Smithers, British Columbia	Paramedic
Tony	38	Kelowna, British Columbia	Electrician
Nicholas	34	Nanaimo, British Columbia	Equipment Services

=== Farmer Kirkland ===
Kirkland is a 35 year old two-spirit, gay former rodeo champion turned cattle farmer and horse boarder from Rosedale, B.C. He is also Indigenous from the Cheam First Nation Band and, he comes from a lineage of Indigenous Chiefs. He has received a diploma in acting from Vancouver Film School, and has worked as an actor on different television projects, as well as appearing in the second season of The Traitors Canada following his run on Farming for Love.

Kirkland's contestants

Name	Age	Location	Occupation
Kale	31	Toronto, Ontario	General Manager
Carson	27	Burnaby, British Columbia	Professional Dancer
Taylor	34	Vancouver, British Columbia	Architectural & Interior Design
Issa	26	Montreal, Quebec	Corporate Lawyer
James	32	Ottawa, Ontario	Server
Gregory	28	Toronto, Ontario	Server
Shaidon	31	London, Ontario	Professional Dancer

=== Farmer Josh ===
Josh is a 27 year old male who runs his family dairy farm in Chilliwack B.C.. He is also a sales representative for a crop input company. He also enjoys playing hockey in his free time.

Josh's contestants

Name	Age	Location	Occupation
Jessie	24	Ottawa, Ontario	Student
Sam	27	Halifax, Nova Scotia	Dog daycare owner
Mya	22	Nanoose Bay, British Columbia	Veterinary Technician
Alexa	22	Muskoka, Ontario	Student
Kennedy	25	Saskatoon, Saskatchewan	Paralegal
Alysha	30	Delta, British Columbia	Marketing Coordinator
Hayley	25	Vancouver, British Columbia	Educational Assistant

=== Farmer Mischa ===
Mischa is a 32 year old male fourth-generation beekeeper and orchardist in Lillooet, British Columbia. He was once a sponsored longboarder, scoring his first pro deal at 18. He later founded a longboard shop in Vancouver. Mischa attended Quest University.

Mischa's contestants

Name	Age	Location	Occupation
Coral	32	Montreal, Quebec	Industrial Administrator
Quinn	30	Golden, British Columbia	Consultant
Aidan	27	Maple Ridge, British Columbia	Server
Rachel	37	Ladysmith, British Columbia	Sign Language Interpreter
Niloo	30	Toronto, Ontario	Writer
Hayley	26	Squamish, British Columbia	Registered Nurse
Jill	31	Kentville, Nova Scotia	HR Coordinator
