= Ruth Chapman =

British fashion entrepreneur (born 1961)

Ruth Chapman OBE
- Born: Ruth Elizabeth Chapman; December 1961 (age 64)
- Occupation: Businessperson
- Known for: MATCHESFASHION.COM
- Spouse: Tom Chapman

Ruth Elizabeth Chapman OBE (born December 1961) is co-founder and former co-CEO of luxury fashion retailer MATCHESFASHION.COM.

== Early life ==
Born on the Wirral, Chapman attended West Kirby Grammar School for Girls.

While growing up, Chapman said she was always interested in fashion and the "power of clothes". She was influenced by her mother, stepmother, and grandmother and, as a teenager, spent the weekends rifling through fashion thrift stores.

After leaving school, Chapman went on to work at fashion brand Jaeger, department store Harrods, and a video production company. At the age of 21, Chapman met Tom Chapman, who convinced her to leave her job to help him run a fashion boutique.

== Career ==
Ruth and Tom Chapman co-founded MATCHESFASHION.COM as a single brick-and-mortar fashion store in Wimbledon, London in 1987. The couple expanded the luxury fashion chain to 14 stores in London, including launching franchise stores for MaxMara and Diane von Furstenberg.

Chapman was known in the industry for working with new and up-and-coming talent, and has said that "discovering" new designers was key to the business' early success.

In 2007, the couple launched the MATCHESFASHION.COM website, which Chapman has called a "seismic moment" for the business. From the launch of the website, the business grew at up to 100 percent per year. The company now stocks over 450 brands shipping to 176 countries, making 95 percent of sales online.

In 2012, the Chapmans raised £20 million in venture capital from SEP and Highland Capital Partners. The company also launched in-house label Raey. In 2015, Ruth and Tom Chapman stepped down as co-CEO of MATCHESFASHION.COM to become joint chairmen.

In 2017, Apax Partners acquired MATCHESFASHION.COM in a deal that valued the company at more than $1 billion. The couple retained a minority stake in the business.

In 2017, Chapman joined the jury of the ANDAM fashion award. Between 2013 and 2017, Chapman sat on the British Fashion Council's NEWGEN selection panel to find new UK fashion talent.

Matches Fashion was subsequently acquired from Apax in December 2023 by Frasers Group and went into administration in 2024.

== Personal life ==
Married to Tom Chapman, the couple have three children. They have properties in London and Los Angeles, and have two dogs.

Chapman supported The Telegraph's Women Mean Business campaign which aimed to close the finance gap between female and male entrepreneurs. Chapman is a Patron of The Prince's Trust's Women Supporting Women campaign.

In 2017, Ruth and Tom Chapman received the Drapers Award for Lifetime Achievement. In 2018, Chapman was shortlisted for the Veuve Clicquot Business Woman of the Year Award.

Ruth and Tom Chapman were both appointed Officer of the Order of the British Empire (OBE) in the 2020 New Year Honours for services to the international fashion retail industry.
