= Matches Fashion =

London-based luxury fashion retailer

Coordinates: 51°27′33″N 0°7′55″W

Matches
- Formerly: MatchesFashion (1987-2022)
- Industry: Luxury; Fashion; Clothing industry; Online shopping
- Founded: 1987; 39 years ago, in London
- Founder: Tom Chapman; Ruth Chapman
- Fate: Acquired by Hulcan 2025
- Headquarters: London, United Kingdom
- Number of locations: 6
- Area served: Worldwide
- Brands: Matches; Raey
- Parent: Independent (1987–2017); Apax Partners (2017–23); Frasers Group (2023–2025); Hulcan (2025–present)
- Website: www.matchesfashion.com (Coming Soon page)

Matches was a global luxury e-commerce platform, Matches offered ready-to-wear, shoes, bags and accessories for womenswear, menswear and lifestyle products. The business operated online and via three stores in London, England.

On 21 July 2024 owner Frasers Group put it into administration after only two months of ownership.

Following its administration and closure in 2024, Matches was acquired by a new ownership group in December 2025. The intellectual property and brand assets, including its in-house label Raey, were purchased from Frasers Group by a newly formed luxury retail company backed by the founders (Joe Wilkinson & Mario Maher) of the shopping app Mile.

== History ==
Tom Chapman and Ruth Chapman opened the first store in Wimbledon Village in 1987, and opened an online store in 2007. In 2012, the Chapmans sold a £20,000,000 stake to venture capital firms to help build its online presence. In 2017, the founders sold the business to private equity firm Apax for an estimated £400 million.

Six months after Ajay Kavan stepped down from his role, Paolo de Cesare became CEO of Matches Fashion in September 2021. After confirming that Nick Beighton would be its new CEO on 12 July 2022, the company received £60m from Apax. to power its turnaround.

On 3 November 2022, it rebranded from Matchesfashion to Matches.

In 2023, Matches saw a revenue drop, but said it has grown its customer base in its UK and US markets and has "improved underlying profitability."

In 2023, Frasers Group acquired Matches Fashion for £52 million from private equity firm Apax Partners.

In 2024, months after Frasers Group acquired Matches Fashion for £52 million, they placed the business into administration and cut over half of staff. Matches CEO Nick Beighton and CFO Dave Murray both left the fashion retailer a week after it entered administration.

== See also ==
- Burberry
- Farfetch
- YOOX Net-a-Porter Group
- Mytheresa
