= Manoir Rouville-Campbell =

Historic building in Quebec, Canada

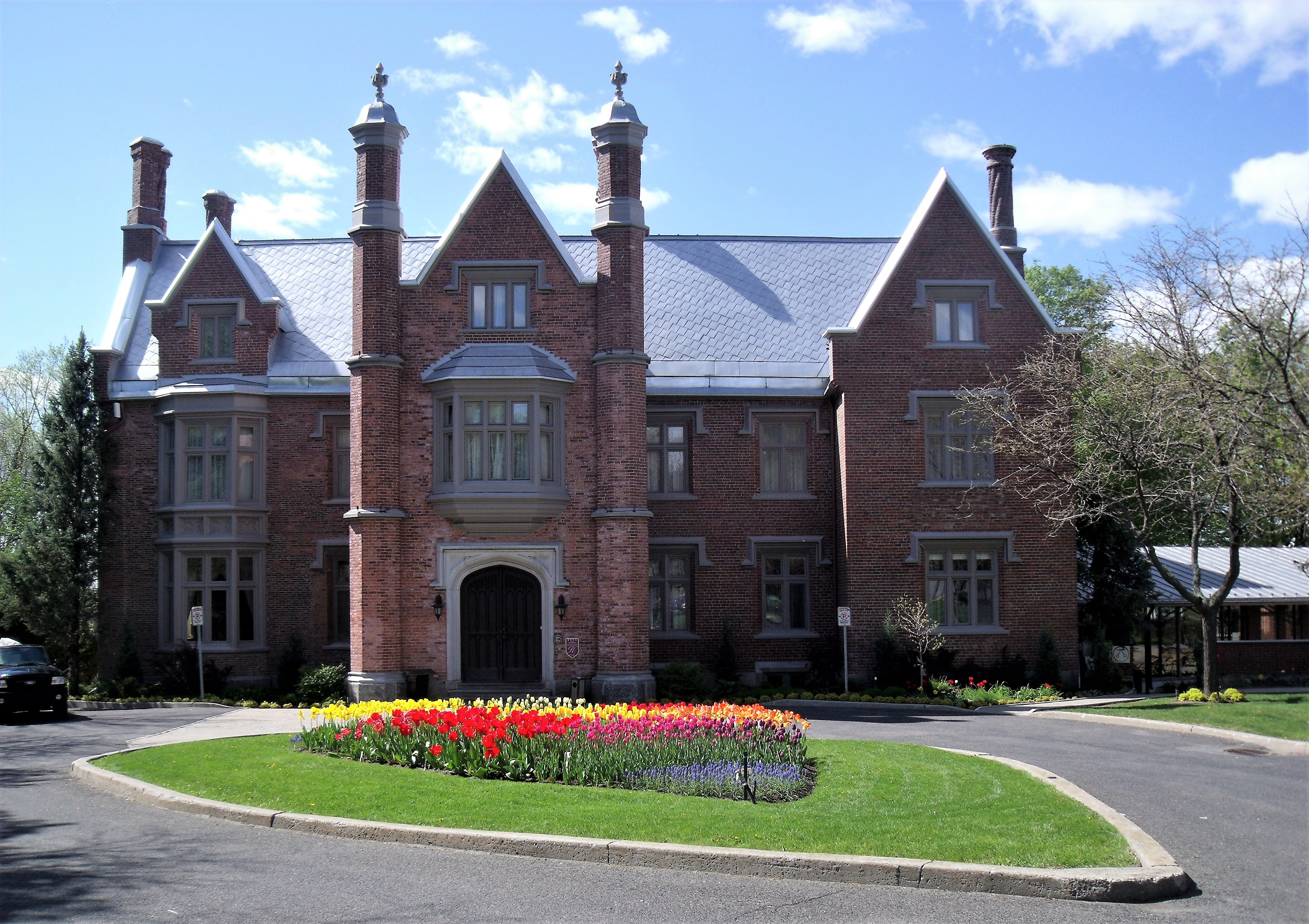
- Facade of Manoir Rouville-Campbell
- Interactive map of the Manoir Rouville-Campbell area

General information
- Architectural style: Neogothic / Tudor
- Coordinates: 45°33′35″N 73°12′02″W
- Year built: 1832–1860

The Manoir Rouville-Campbell is a historic building located in Mont-Saint-Hilaire in the Montérégie region of Quebec, Canada. It had been a listed heritage building since 1979. Since 2023, it has been the location for the reality TV show The Traitors Canada.

== History ==
In 1694, Jean-Baptiste Hertel de Rouville received the seigneury of Rouville as a reward for his military exploits. His descendant, Jean-Baptiste-René Hertel de Rouville, inherited the seigneury in 1817. In 1832, he had the Manor House built, a classically inspired building with a two-storey square topped by a triangular pediment.

In 1844, facing financial difficulties, he put the Rouville seigneury, including Mont Saint-Hilaire, up for sale. Upon learning of the sale, Major Thomas Edmund Campbell quickly purchased it and moved his family there. In 1853, Campbell hired the architect Frederick Lawford to transform the manor house in a Tudor-inspired Gothic Revival style. The work, which doubled the manor house's size, was completed in 1860.

The manor house and its stables were transformed into a luxury hotel, in 1986.

In 2022, the hotel was put up for sale and later donated to the City of Mont-Saint-Hilaire.

In 2023, it became the location for the reality TV show The Traitors Canada, a reality competition show for CTV.

== Owners ==
- 1832–1844 : Jean-Baptiste-René Hertel de Rouville
- 1844–1955 : Thomas Edmund Campbell and family
- 1955–1969 : multiple
- 1969–1986 : Jordi Bonet et famille
- 1986–1991 : Yves Dion, hôtelier
- 1991–1996 : Jacques et Carmen Daigle
- 1996–2006 : Yvon Deschamps et Judi Richards
- 2006–2022 : Groupe Gestion G5 (André Imbeau)
- 2022 : City of Mont-Saint-Hilaire
