= Tom Chapman (businessman) =

British entrepreneur (born 1963)

Tom Chapman OBE
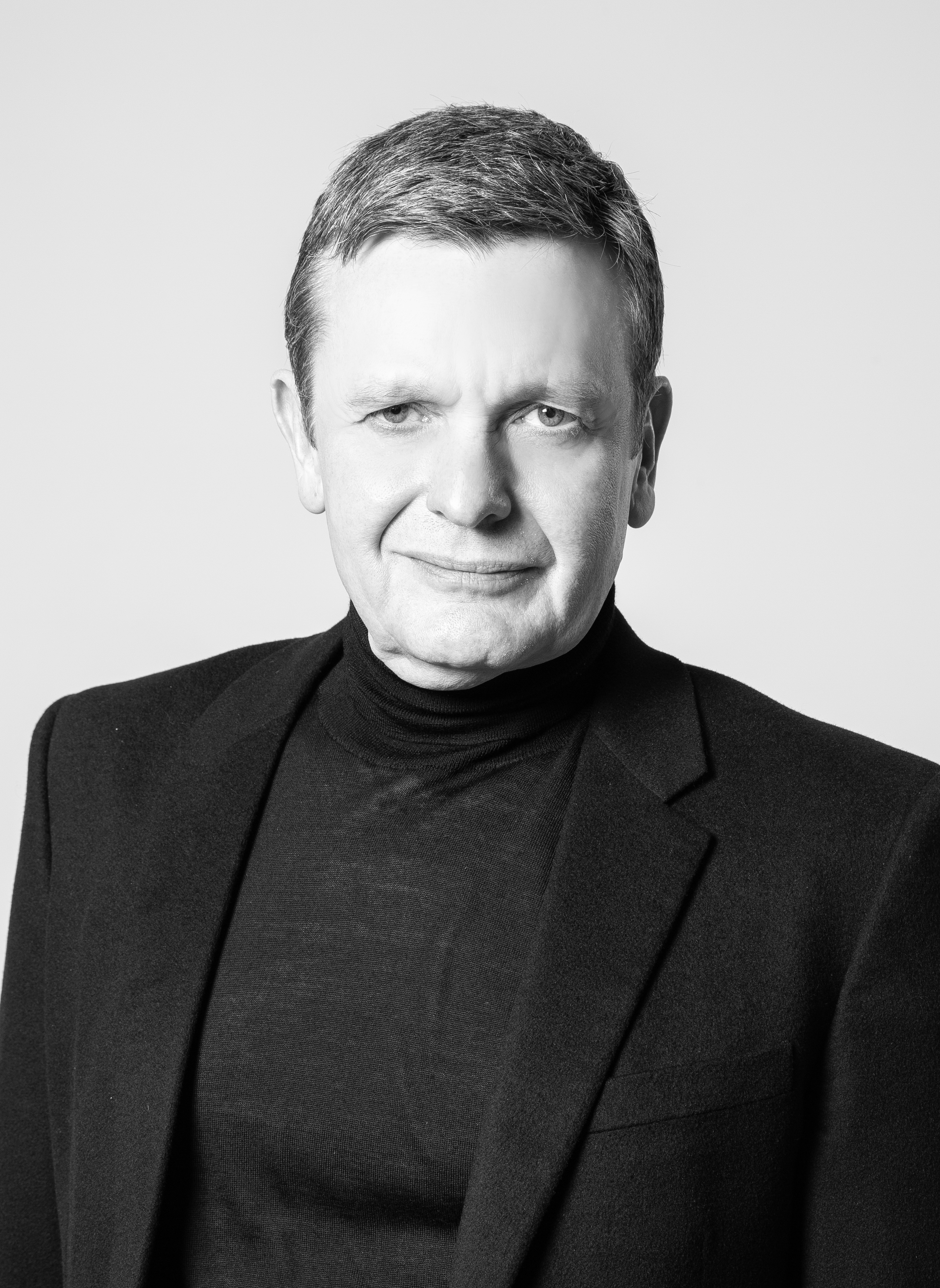
- Chapman in 2019
- Born: Thomas Watson Chapman; June 1963 (age 63); Wimbledon, London
- Occupations: Businessperson, entrepreneur, investor
- Known for: Co-founder of MATCHESFASHION.COM
- Spouse: Ruth Chapman

Thomas Watson Chapman OBE (born June 1963) is a British entrepreneur and investor.

He is the co-founder of luxury fashion retailer MATCHESFASHION, which developed from a single London store into an international online retailer before being acquired by private equity firm Apax Partners in 2017.

== Early life and education ==
Chapman was born in Wimbledon, London. He studied hotel and hospitality management before entering the retail sector.

== Career ==
=== Matchesfashion.com ===
In 1987, Chapman co-founded MATCHESFASHION in Wimbledon, London, initially operating as a single independent fashion store. Over the following decades, the business expanded its physical retail presence and later developed an online platform as luxury fashion e-commerce became more established.

During the 2000s and 2010s, MATCHESFASHION evolved into a multi-channel retailer combining physical stores with international online sales. The company became known for its focus on designer fashion and editorial-led retail content.

In 2017, MATCHESFASHION was acquired by Apax Partners . Following the acquisition, Chapman stepped down from his executive role and later became a joint chairman of the business. He retained a minority shareholding after the transaction.

== Investment portfolio and later ventures ==
Since 2017, Chapman has focused on early-stage investing through his family office, the Chapman Office. His investment activity has included businesses across consumer, technology, healthcare, and digital services sectors in the United Kingdom and the United States.

In 2022, Chapman co-founded ABASK, a London-based luxury e-commerce platform specialising in curated homeware, design objects, and lifestyle goods.

== Awards and honours ==
In 2017, Chapman received the Drapers Lifetime Achievement Award. In 2018, he was inducted into the Business of Fashion Hall of Fame.

In the 2020 New Year Honours, Tom Chapman and Ruth Chapman were both appointed Officers of the Order of the British Empire (OBE) for services to the international fashion retail industry.

== Personal life ==
Chapman is married to Ruth Chapman, with whom he has three children.
