= The Traitors Canada =

CTV reality competition show

- Also known as: The Traitors
- Genre: Reality; Game show
- Based on: De Verraders by: Marc Pos; Jasper Hoogendoorn
- Presented by: Karine Vanasse
- Country of origin: Canada
- Original language: English
- No. of seasons: 4
- No. of episodes: 35

Production
- Camera setup: Multi-camera
- Running time: 43 minutes 48-55 minutes (Crave extended edition - season 2 to present)
- Production company: Entourage

Original release
- Network: CTV
- Release: October 2, 2023 – present

The Traitors Canada is a Canadian reality television series, that is based on the Dutch series De Verraders. It is hosted by the French-Canadian actress Karine Vanasse.

Following the premise of other versions of De Verraders, the show features a group of contestants participating in a social deduction game similar to Mafia or Werewolf, as they stay in a historic manor. During their stay, a small group of contestants become the titular "Traitors," and must work together to eliminate the other contestants to win a grand prize, while the remaining contestants become "Faithful" and are tasked to discover and banish the Traitors by voting them out, to win a grand prize worth up to $100,000.

The English Canadian show is a sister show to the French-Canadian edition, titled Les Traîtres, with both being produced by Entourage for CTV and Noovo. They share the same location, props, missions, with Karine Vanasse hosting both versions.

In August 2024, the series was renewed for a second season, which premiered on September 23, 2024. In March 2025, the series was renewed for a third season. In December 2025, the series was renewed for a fourth season, which is set to premiere September 21, 2026.

== Format ==
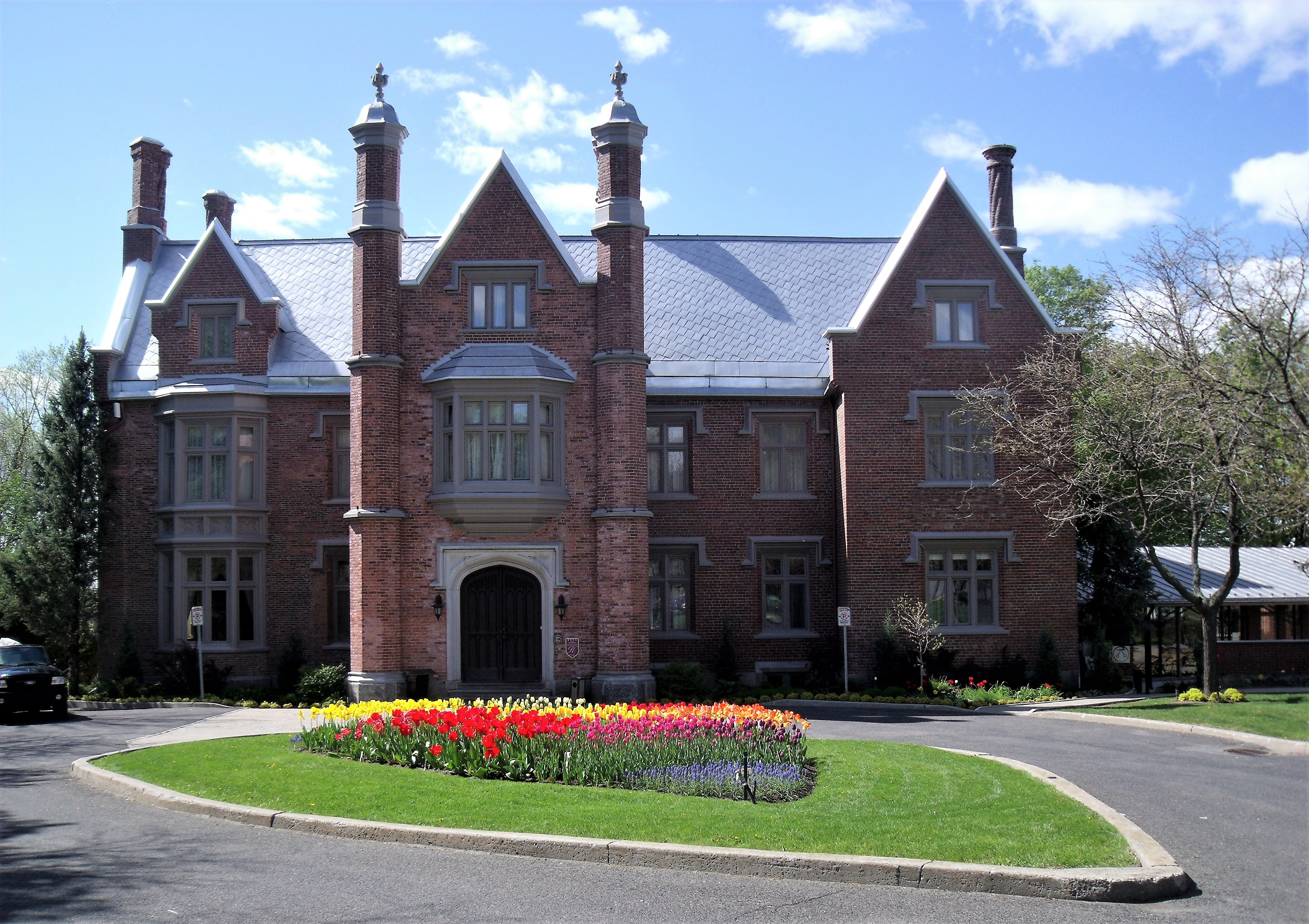
The series is filmed at Manoir Rouville-Campbell.

A group of contestants arrive at an historic manor, the Manoir Rouville-Campbell in Mont-Saint-Hilaire in the Montérégie région, with hopes of winning a share of the $100,000 prize. Among the group are the "Traitors" – a small group of contestants selected by the host on the first day, whose goal is to eliminate the Faithfuls and claim the prize for themselves. Should the Faithful contestants eliminate all the Traitors, they will share the prize fund. If a Traitor makes it to the end, they steal the money.

Each night, the Traitors come together and decide upon one Faithful contestant to "murder" – and that person will leave the game immediately. The remaining Faithful contestants will not know who has been eliminated until the following day when they will not arrive for breakfast. The group then take part in a mission to win money for the prize fund.

Each Day, the group then takes part in a mission to add money to the prize fund. Some challenges also offer an opportunity for players to win a shield, which gives the player immunity from being murdered, but not from the banishment vote. An attempted murder on the shield holder will result in no player being eliminated.

At the end of each day, the group will participate in the Banishment Ceremony – where the players gather at the Round Table to discuss who they wish to vote out before individually voting for a player to banish. Players cast their votes privately before revealing their vote in turn to everyone. The person obtaining the most votes is banished from the game and must reveal their affiliation. In a tied vote, a run-off vote occurs between those tied with the highest vote tallies. In the event of a second tie, a new vote is held with those played involved in the initial tied vote now being immune from Banishment.

Occasionally, twists will impact the course of the game – most notably with Traitors being given opportunities to recruit new Traitors among remaining Faithful players.

=== End Game ===
On the final episode, the players will participate in the End Game. First, the players will participate in the final Banishment Ceremony to narrow down the game to four finalists. At this Banishment Ceremony, any banished person did not reveal if they were a Faithful or a Traitor.

When four players remain, the players gather at the Fire of Truth. At the Fire, players are given a choice to "Banish Again" or to "End Game." A unanimous "End Game" vote concludes the game, while a single vote to "Banish Again" results in another banishment vote, followed by another choice between "Banish Again" or "End Game." In a season two, the banished players didn't reveal whether they were a Faithful or Traitor. When the game ends, if all remaining players are Faithful, then the prize money is divided evenly among them. However, if any Traitors remain, they win the entire pot.

== Production ==
On June 6, 2023, it was announced that Bell Media had commissioned English and French language adaptations. Karine Vanasse, the host of the show, would also present the French language version Les Traîtres, making her the first person to host multiple versions of the franchise. Both versions slated to film back-to-back in Quebec over the summer.

=== Series overview ===
Series overview
Season	Contestants	Episodes	Originally released		Winner(s)	Runner(s)-up	Prize	Traitors
Season	Contestants	Episodes	First released	Last released	Winner(s)	Runner(s)-up	Prize	Traitors
1	20	10	October 2, 2023	December 4, 2023	Mike D'Urzo (Traitor)	Gurleen Maan (Faithful)	$94,500 / $100,000	Kuzie Mujakachi Melissa Best Mike D'Urzo Mickey Henry (from ep. 9)
2	22	10	September 23, 2024	December 2, 2024	Neda Kalantar (Traitor)	Tranna Wintour (Faithful)	$72,000 / $100,000	Kyra Provost Michael John Ferri Neda Kalantar
3	22	10	October 21, 2025	December 16, 2025	Dom Gabriel & Hollywood Jade (Faithful)	Lisette Sumbu (Faithful)	$93,100 / 100,000	Coco Belliveau Kevin Jacobs Venus Vafa (from ep. 2) Ria Rollins (from ep. 6) Cagla Baktiroglu (from ep. 9)
4	22	10	September 21, 2026	November 23, 2026	TBA	TBA	TBA	Katelyn Sinclair Taya Valkyrie Victoria "Spicy Vee" Woghiren Sherod Beneby (from ep. 2)

=== Season 1 (2023) ===
The Traitors season 1 episodes
No. overall	No. in season	Title	Original release date
1	1	"Dead Man Walking"	October 2, 2023
2	2	"Keep Digging"	October 9, 2023
3	3	"This Act is to Die For"	October 16, 2023
4	4	"Landing the Shield"	October 23, 2023
5	5	"Sinners or Saints"	October 30, 2023
6	6	"Ghost Hunting"	November 6, 2023
7	7	"At The Bottom of the Barrel"	November 13, 2023
8	8	"Date with Destiny"	November 20, 2023
9	9	"There's No Escape"	November 27, 2023
10	10	"Trust Your Instincts"	December 4, 2023

=== Season 2 (2024) ===
The Traitors season 2 episodes
No. overall	No. in season	Title	Original release date
11	1	"A Sacrificial Arrival"	September 23, 2024
12	2	"The Hunt Has Begun"	September 30, 2024
13	3	"Ride Or Die"	October 7, 2024
14	4	"A Secret Mission"	October 14, 2024
15	5	"Sinners or Saints"	October 21, 2024
16	6	"The Cage"	November 4, 2024
17	7	"The Art of Manipulation"	November 11, 2024
18	8	"The Trust"	November 18, 2024
19	9	"Tensions Rising"	November 25, 2024
20	10	"Dig to the End"	December 2, 2024

=== Season 3 (2025) ===
The Traitors Canada season 3 episodes
No. overall	No. in season	Title	Original release date
21	1	"Overconfidence is a Curse"	October 21, 2025
22	2	"Revenge"	October 28, 2025
23	3	"Save Me Please"	November 4, 2025
24	4	"It's Time"	November 11, 2025
25	5	"A Heavy Legacy"	November 18, 2025
26	6	"The Trap"	November 25, 2025
27	7	"A Cursed Shield"	December 2, 2025
28	8	"Choosing Your Words"	December 9, 2025
29	9	"Blackmail"	December 16, 2025
30	10	"Where It All Ends.."	December 16, 2025

=== Season 4 (2026) ===
The Traitors Canada season 4 episodes
No. overall	No. in season	Title	Original release date
31	1	"The Spark"	September 21, 2026
32	2	"A Shot in the Dark"	September 28, 2026
33	3	"Borrowed Time"	October 5, 2026
34	4	"The Misfits"	October 12, 2026
35	5	"The Heir"	October 19, 2026
36	6	"A Taste Of Death"	October 26, 2026

== See also ==
Other versions

- The Traitors Australia
- The Traitors Ireland
- De Verraders/The Traitors Netherlands
- The Traitors NZ
- The Traitors UK
- The Traitors US

Similar shows

- The Mole
- Big Brother Canada
