= Cheryl (drag queen) =

English drag queen (born 1993)

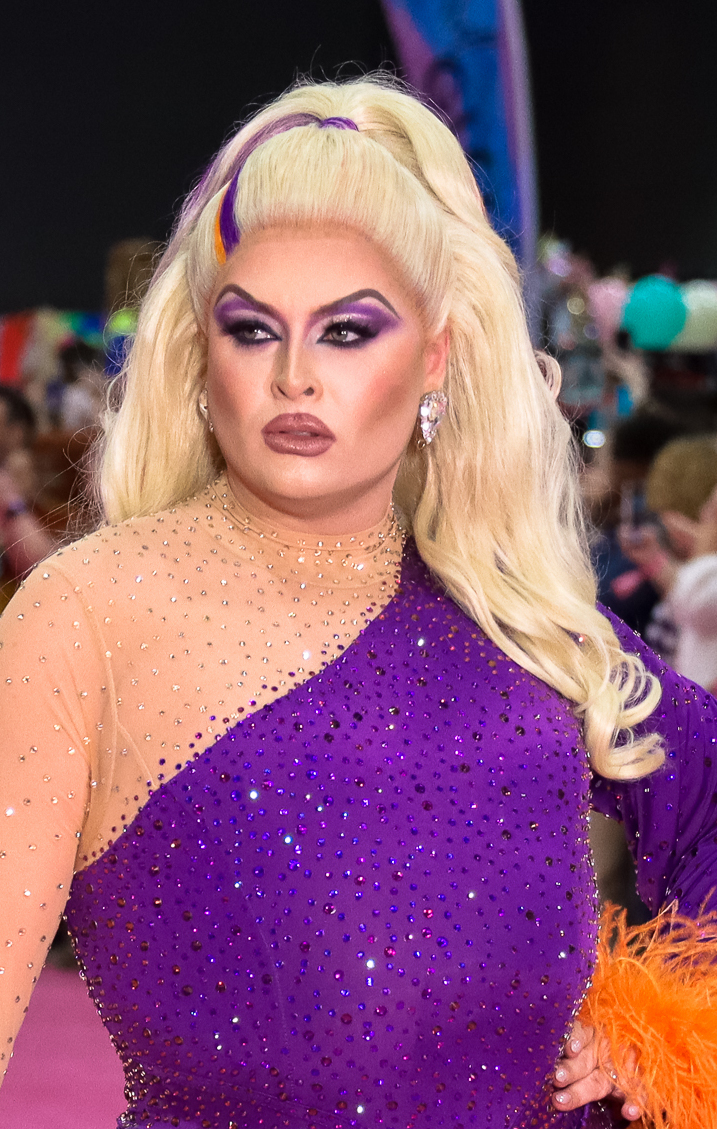
- Cheryl at RuPaul's DragCon LA, 2023
- Born: Luke Underwood; 18 October 1993 (age 32); Chelmsford, Essex, England
- Other name: Cheryl Hole
- Occupation: Drag queen
- Television: RuPaul's Drag Race UK (series 1); RuPaul's Drag Race: UK vs. the World (series 1); Canada's Drag Race: Canada vs. the World (season 2)
- Spouse: Haydn Bleach (m. 2021)
- Website: www.cheryldragqueen.com

Cheryl, formerly known as Cheryl Hole (born 18 October 1993), is the stage name of Luke Underwood-Bleach, an English drag queen known for being one of the first contestants on the first series of RuPaul's Drag Race UK (2019), as well as the first series of RuPaul's Drag Race: UK vs. the World (2022), and the second season of Canada's Drag Race: Canada vs. the World (2024).

== Early life ==
Luke Underwood was born on 18 October 1993 and raised in Chelmsford in Essex.

== Career ==
Underwood-Bleach began doing drag under the stage name "Cheryl Hole" sometime in the 2010s; his (Note: This performer identifies as a man out of drag and uses he/him pronouns, per several articles) act is based on former Girls Aloud singer Cheryl Cole. On 3 April 2019, Underwood-Bleach and his then fiancé took part in the Comedy Central show Your Face Or Mine? hosted by Jimmy Carr and Katherine Ryan.

On 21 August 2019, Cheryl Hole was announced as one of the ten contestants to be competing in the first series of RuPaul's Drag Race UK. In the sixth episode, she lip-synched to Cheryl's "Call My Name" in front of guest judge Cheryl, eliminating Blu Hydrangea from the competition. He was eliminated in the seventh (and penultimate) episode after losing a lip sync to Baga Chipz to Amy Winehouse's "Tears Dry on Their Own" (2007). Cheryl Hole placed fourth overall.

On 28 November 2019, Cheryl Hole, alongside the cast of series one of RuPaul's Drag Race UK, embarked on a 12-gig UK tour, hosted by Drag Race alum Alyssa Edwards. In December 2019, Cheryl Hole was unveiled as Virgin Media's Christmas "fairy gift mother" for their Christmas campaign giving gift and surprises to Virgin Media customers. In July 2020, Cheryl Hole started a new podcast called Girl Group Gossip produced by World of Wonder, where she is joined by a co-host and a special guest related to the topic of that episode. In November 2020, Cheryl Hole joined RuPaul's Drag Race UK series 1 winner The Vivienne on the UK version of the Netflix YouTube series I Like to Watch for three consecutive episodes.

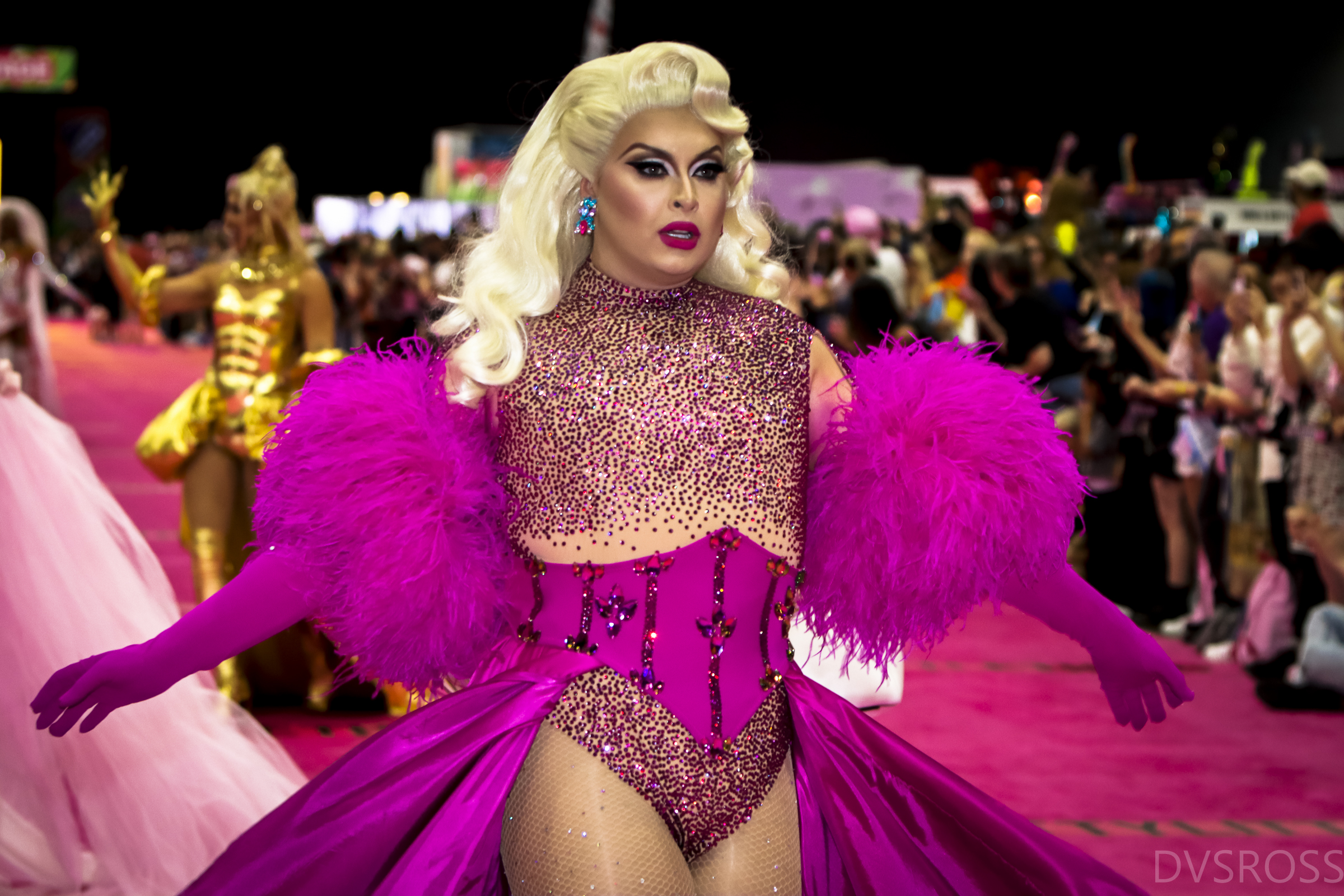
Cheryl Hole at RuPaul's DragCon LA, 2022

In January 2022, Cheryl Hole was announced as one of the nine contestants on the first series of RuPaul's Drag Race: UK vs. the World. After falling into the bottom for his performance in the ball challenge, she was eliminated by Janey Jacké from the first season of the Dutch franchise, who won the lip sync against Canada's Drag Race season 1 contestant, Jimbo. Cheryl Hole was the second queen eliminated in the competition, ultimately placing eighth overall, and released her debut single "Need the Power" on 11 February 2022 after the aforementioned elimination. The single was co-written by Cheryl Hole alongside the creative team behind fellow Drag Race star Priyanka's Taste Test EP. Cheryl Hole released the song's music video the same day, featuring numerous guests including fellow RuPaul's Drag Race UK stars Vanity Milan, River Medway, and Elektra Fence. In March 2022, Cheryl Hole was announced to have been voted by his RuPaul's Drag Race: UK vs the World castmates as the season's Miss Congeniality, sharing the title with Janey Jacké and Jujubee, with Pangina Heals and Blu Hydrangea casting their vote for Cheryl.

In 2022, Underwood-Bleach made his West End debut in the play Death Drop.

Underwood-Bleach appeared on the 16 August 2023 edition of BBC One's Celebrity MasterChef. Speaking to BBC News before the appearance, he highlighted issues facing the LGBTQ+ community and said the appearance of LGBTQ+ people on television was a chance to "have our voices and stories heard and show we're nothing to be feared".

In 2024, Cheryl stopped using the last name Hole, and adopted a mononym. Cheryl returned again to compete on the second season of Canada's Drag Race: Canada vs. the World, placing in 3rd/4th.

== Personal life ==
On 24 September 2021, Underwood and his partner, Haydn Bleach, married; upon which their last names were double-barrelled to Underwood-Bleach.

== Discography ==
=== Singles ===
==== As lead artist ====
Title	Year	Album
"Need the Power"	2022	Non-album single

==== As featured artist ====
Title	Year	Peak chart positions		Album
Title	Year	UK	US Elec.	Album
"Break Up (Bye Bye)" (Filth Harmony version) (with the Cast of RuPaul's Drag Race UK, Season 1)	2019	35	45	Non-album single

==== Guest appearances ====
List of non-single guest appearances, with other performing artists, showing year released and album name
Title	Year	Other artist(s)	Album
"Snatch"	2021	Priyanka	Taste Test

== Filmography ==
- Dear Viv (2025)

=== Television ===
Year	Title	Role	Notes
2018	BBC Breakfast	Herself	Guest
2019	Your Face or Mine?	Herself	Guest
2019	RuPaul's Drag Race UK	Herself	Contestant (4th place); Series 1
2020	Celebrity Juice	Herself	Guest
2021	Celebs on the Farm	Herself	Contestant (runner-up); series 3
2021	The Only Way Is Essex	Herself	Guest
2021	Be Here, Be Queer	Herself	Netflix special
2022	RuPaul's Drag Race: UK vs. the World	Herself	Contestant (8th place); Series 1
2023	Celebrity MasterChef	Herself	Series 18; Contestant
2024	Canada's Drag Race: Canada vs. the World	Herself	Contestant (3rd/4th place); Season 2

=== Web ===
Year	Title	Role	Notes
2020	God Shave the Queens	Herself	Produced by World of Wonder
2020–2021	I Like to Watch UK	Herself	Netflix UK & Ireland
2022	Bring Back My Girls	Herself	Produced by World of Wonder
2023	Binge Queens: UK5	Herself (Host)	With Blu Hydrangea, Produced by World of Wonder
2023	Very Delta	Herself	

=== Podcasts ===
Year	Title	Role	Ref.
2020–2021	Girl Group Gossip	Host	
2022	Killers, Cults and Queens	Host	

=== Music videos ===
Year	Title	Artist	Ref.
2020	"Always"	Waze & Odyssey	
2021	"My House"	Jodie Harsh	
