= La Kahena =

French drag performer

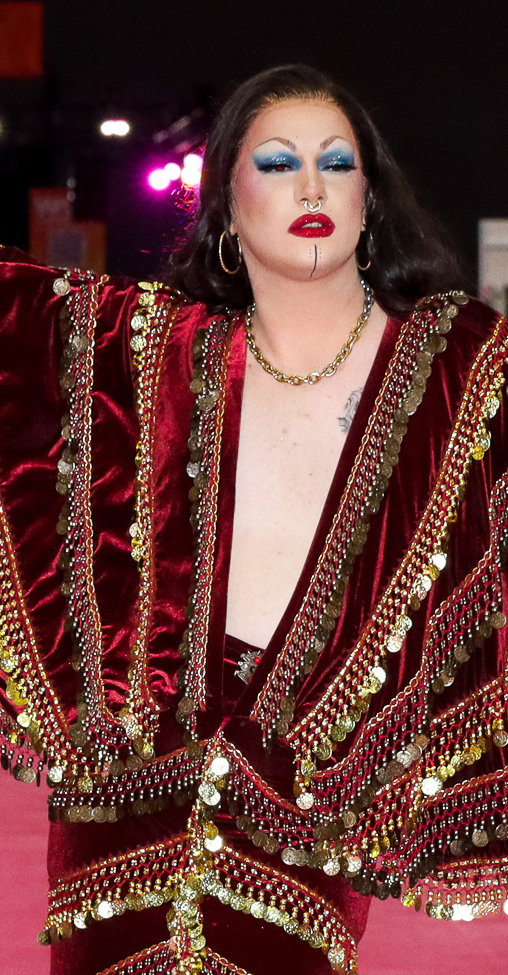
- La Kahena at RuPaul's DragCon LA, 2024
- Born: Malek Ben Halima
- Occupation: Drag queen
- Television: Drag Race France (season 1); Canada's Drag Race: Canada vs. the World (season 2)

La Kahena is the stage name of Malek Ben Halima, a Tunisian-French drag performer who competed on the first season of Drag Race France, where she was eliminated first. She returned to compete on the second season of Canada's Drag Race: Canada vs. the World where she was once again eliminated first, becoming the first contestant in Drag Race history to be eliminated first in two different seasons.

== Personal life ==
As of 2024 she was based in Paris.

== Filmography ==
=== Television ===
- Drag Race France (season 1)
- Canada's Drag Race: Canada vs. the World (season 2)
