= Taste Test (EP) =

EP by Priyanka
- Released: July 16, 2021
- Genre: Dance-pop
- Length: 14:56
- Label: Question Mark Productions
- Producer: Craig McConnell; Tyler Tsang

Singles from Taste Test
- 1. "Cake" Released: May 28, 2021; 2. "Bitch I'm Busy" Released: July 14, 2021; 3. "Come Through" Released: September 6, 2021; 4. "Snatch" Released: July 21, 2022

Taste Test is the debut extended play by Canadian drag queen Priyanka, released on July 16, 2021. Guests on the five-track collection include fellow Canada's Drag Race contestant Lemon as well as RuPaul's Drag Race UK contestant Cheryl Hole.

== Composition ==
Priyanka has said of the EP's creative process:

I began working on new music at a time when my life was in shambles. My uncle died, I got into a car accident and my boyfriend had just dumped me. I was inspired to channel all of that pain and confusion into larger-than-life pop songs my fans could dance and cry to.

She has also said:

There was a time when people looked at drag queens to kind of just be like clowns. But music is the next chapter where drag artists are charting on iTunes and drag artists are selling out stadiums, or opening for artists like Ariana Grande and Little Mix.... I think it's time for that because people don't take it seriously because we're kind of looked at like circus freaks. And we are, and that's why we're amazing and beautiful and creative, and there's so much pizzazz about us, but it's time for people to take drag music seriously."

Fellow Canada's Drag Race contestant Lemon is featured on "Come Through" and RuPaul's Drag Race UK contestant Cheryl Hole appears on "Snatch".

== Promotion ==
"Cake" and "Bitch I'm Busy" were released as singles on May 28 and July 14, 2021, respectively, while "Come Through" premiered on the Canada's Drag Race Anniversary Extravaganza reunion special on September 6. A launch party was held at Vancouver's Hollywood Theatre on July 17.

Four of the five songs on the EP had accompanying music videos, all of which combined into a single comedic murder mystery story parodying The Hunger Games, concluding in a video game boss battle between Priyanka and villain Cheryl Hole in the "Snatch" video. The only song without a video made was "Afterglow"; instead, the video for her non-EP Christmas single "Sleigh My Name" featured a short coda linking "Come Through" with "Snatch". Each of the videos has also featured cameo appearances by one or more of Priyanka's castmates in the first season of Canada's Drag Race; several have also included cameos by actor and dancer Donté Colley in a bit part as a television journalist reporting on the events of the videos' storyline. Several of the videos have featured choreography by Hollywood Jade.

== Critical reception ==
The music video for "Come Through" received a nomination at the 2022 UK Music Video Awards for Best Hair & Make-Up in a Video.

== Track listing ==
No.	Title	Writer(s)	Length
1.	"Cake"	Leah Allyce Canali; Stacey Kay; Mark Suknanan; Tyler Tsang	2:42
2.	"Bitch I'm Busy"	Tafari Anthony; Canali; Kay; Suknanan; Tsang	3:27
3.	"Come Through" (featuring Lemon)	Canali; Kay; Craig McConnell; Suknanan	2:48
4.	"Afterglow"	Canali; Kay; McConnell; Suknanan	3:25
5.	"Snatch" (featuring Cheryl Hole)	Canali; Kay; McConnell; Suknanan	2:33
