= Devastatia =

Studio album by Priyanka
- Released: August 23, 2024
- Length: 22:44
- Label: Question Mark Productions

Priyanka chronology
Taste Test (2021)	Devastatia (2024)

Devastatia is the debut studio album by Canadian drag performer Priyanka, released on August 23, 2024. The album includes collaborations with Canadian singer Ralph and fellow Canadian drag queen Lemon. It includes previously released singles "No New Friends" and "Shut It Down" and will be promoted with a North American tour in October/November 2024 called "The Devastatia Tour".

== Composition ==
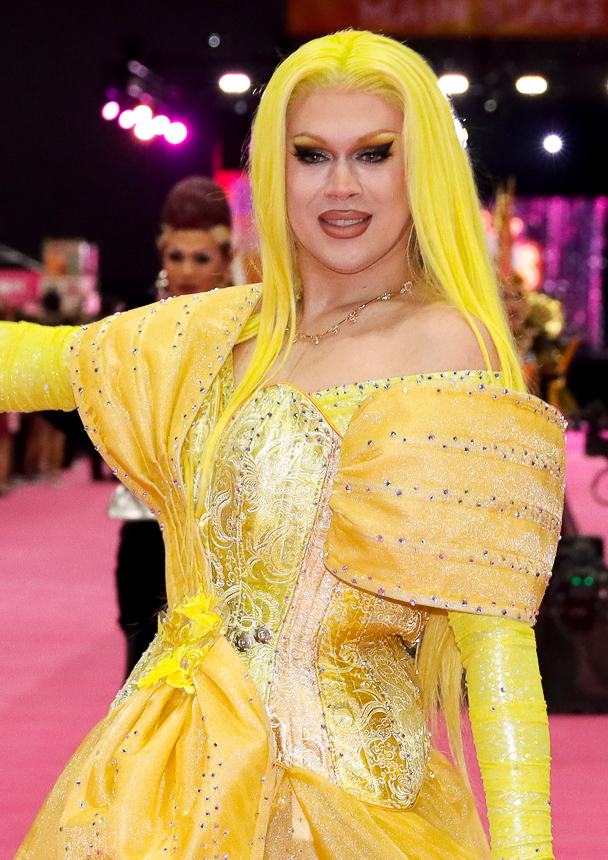
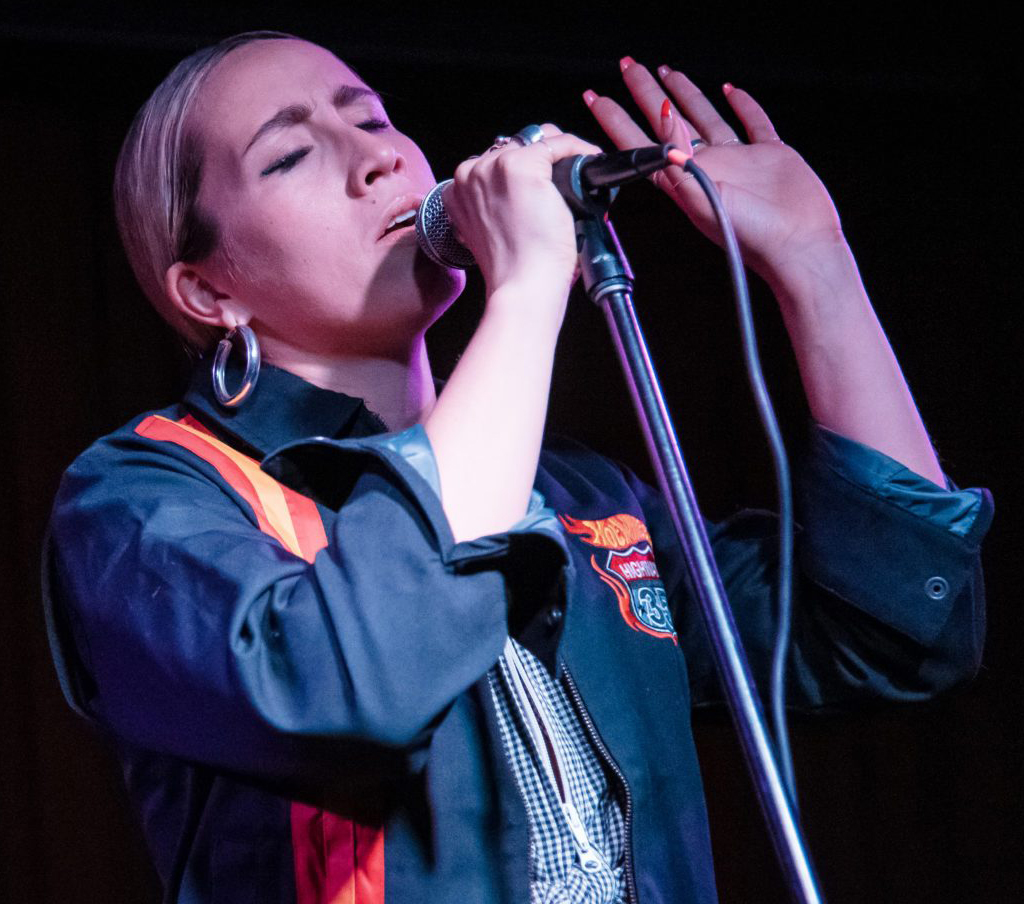
Lemon (left) and Ralph (right)

The album has collaborations with Canadian singer Ralph and drag performer Lemon.

== Promotion ==
Following is a list of tour dates:

- 10/09 Kingston, ON - The Broom Factory
- 10/11 Montreal, QC - Studio TD
- 10/19 New York, NY - Mercury Lounge
- 10/20 Washington, D.C. - Songbyrd
- 10/23 Chicago, IL - Schubas Tavern
- 10/25 Winnipeg, MB - West End Cultural Centre
- 10/26 Regina, SK - The Exchange
- 10/27 Saskatoon, SK - Louis' Pub
- 10/28 Edmonton, AB - Double Dragon
- 10/31 Vancouver, BC - Celebrities Nightclub
- 11/01 Victoria, BC - Capital Ballroom
- 11/02 Seattle, WA - Madame Lou's
- 11/03 Portland, OR - Mississippi Studios
- 11/08 San Francisco, CA - Rickshaw Stop
- 11/09 Los Angeles, CA - Peppermint Lounge
- 11/13 London, ON - Rum Runners
- 11/15 Windsor, ON - Rockstar Music Hall
- 11/22 Charlottetown, PE - PEI Brewing
- 11/23 Fredericton, NB - Charlotte Street Arts Centre
- 11/24 Quebec City, QC - Le Drague
- 11/27 Toronto, ON - Axis Club

== Track listing ==
Devastatia track listing
No.	Title	Length
1.	"I'm a Star"	3:12
2.	"Toss Up!"	2:27
3.	"Devastatia"	2:24
4.	"Problem Pageant"	2:44
5.	"Bad Bitches Don't Cry" (featuring Ralph)	2:45
6.	"No New Friends"	2:58
7.	"Shut It Down"	2:50
8.	"Gucciyanka" (featuring Lemon)	3:24
Total length:		22:44
