= Le Fil (drag queen) =

British drag performer and singer

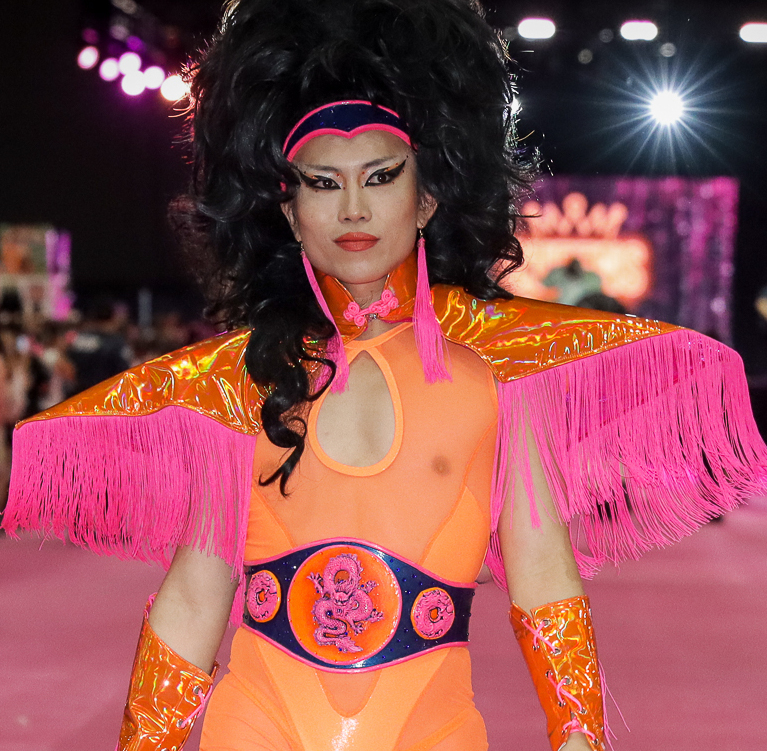
- Le Fil at RuPaul's DragCon LA, 2024
- Born: Philip Simon Li; Brighouse, West Yorkshire, England
- Occupation: Drag performer
- Television: RuPaul's Drag Race UK (series 4); Canada's Drag Race: Canada vs. the World (season 2)
- Website: lefil.co.uk

Le Fil is the stage name of Philip Simon Li, a British artist, drag performer and singer-songwriter who competed on the fourth series of RuPaul's Drag Race UK and the second season of Canada's Drag Race: Canada vs. the World.

== Career ==
Le Fil is an artist, drag performer and singer. The first time they performed as Le Fil was at their debut solo art exhibition "Pop Sculpture: The Filosophy of Making" at Camberwell Space art gallery featuring their ceramic sculptures, drawings and live music performance. Le Fil's debut extended play (EP) Pop Sculpture was released in 2012. This was followed by the release of his second EP Nightlife in 2015 which was produced by Frankmusik. Nightlife had five singles which all received music videos, including the single "24/7". The music video was filmed in Chinatown London.

Le Fil is a member of LGBTQ collective Sink The Pink and toured with Spice Girl Melanie C and has appeared in British Vogue.

=== Television and RuPaul's Drag Race ===
Le Fil competed on series 4 of RuPaul's Drag Race UK. Le Fil succeeded in the girl group challenge with a group win. He also played the lead role of Mary Poppins in the Rusical challenge and presented a runway inspired by The King and I. His low placement that week proved controversial with the fans. Le Fil impersonated Marie Kondo on the Snatch Game challenge, which was the sixth episode of the season. They placed in the bottom two of the challenge, and were eliminated after losing a lip sync against Black Peppa to "Stop" (1998) by the Spice Girls, achieving seventh place in the competition. After the show aired, Le Fil toured with her fellow cast members.

Le Fil's five-track extended play (EP) Le Filosophical featured songs inspired by his Drag Race UK runways. It was released in 2022. Their single "This Is My Culture" received a music video. In 2023, Le Fil released the single "Splash Zone".

Le Fil appeared on series 2 of Canada's Drag Race vs The World and received rave reviews for their girl group challenge which has been described as "one of the most underappreciated performances in all of Girl Group Challenge history". Shortly after, Le Fil appeared on another Canadian TV programme, Queen Of The Castle on CTV.

=== Film ===
Le Fil appeared in Steven Soderbergh's 2025 film The Christophers, starring Ian McKellen, Michaela Coel, James Corden and Jessica Gunning. He played Lori's flatmate in the film.

=== Theatre and live performance ===
Le Fil has performed extensively as a live artist and entertainer. His theatre credits include the immersive nightclub musical Club NVRLND, in which he plays Tiger Lily and completed the six week 2025 UK tour 'Dragged To The Musicals'.

He has also performed at major LGBTQ+ and pop events, including Pride in London at Trafalgar Square on July 4th 2026. Le Fil also appeared onstage as part of a Pride celebration during Harry Styles' Wembley Stadium residency.

== Personal life ==
Le Fil is from Brighouse, and is of Chinese ancestry. Growing up, they were on the same school choir as Divina de Campo. They use the pronouns he/him and they/them in and out of drag. Le Fil cites Andy Warhol as one of their main artistic influences.

== Discography ==
=== EPs ===
- Nightlife (2016)
- Le Filosophical (2022)
- Le Filosophical - Part II (2022)

=== Singles ===
==== As main artist ====
- Genesis (2016)
- Beautiful Game (2019)
- Boyo (2020)
- Undercover Lover (2020)
- Put Your Money Where Your Mouth Is (2020)
- Movie Love (2020)
- Ready 4 U (2022)
- P.U.D.S.E.Y. (2022)
- Pick up the Trash (2022)
- Feeling so Good (2022)
- Splash Zone (2023)
- Break This Cycle (2024)
- Le Fil Me Up (2024)

==== As featured artist ====
- Serotonin (TIN feat. Le Fil) (2025)

== Filmography ==
=== Television ===
- RuPaul's Drag Race UK (series 4)
- Canada's Drag Race: Canada vs. the World (season 2)
- Bring Back My Girls (2024)

=== Film ===
- The Christophers (2025)
