= Tafari Anthony =

Canadian rhythm and blues singer and songwriter

Tafari Anthony is a Canadian rhythm and blues singer and songwriter.

Originally from Toronto, Ontario, Anthony studied graphic design at Cambrian College in Sudbury. While living there, he was involved in the city's YES Theatre collective, and submitted his original song "Maybe When I Get Older" to CBC Radio 2's Searchlight competition in 2016. Although he did not win the competition, he finished in the Top 25; when he released his debut EP Die for You later in the year, the network placed his single "Know Better" into high rotation and named it as one of the top Canadian songs of the year. His second EP, Remember When, followed in 2017.

After taking some time to refine his sound, he returned in 2020 with the singles "Live in a Dream" and "No Good", leading up to the release of his third EP The Way You See Me. With the COVID-19 pandemic limiting touring in 2020, the new singles were promoted in part with a livestreamed performance as part of Sudbury Pride's digital Queerantine program.

The Way You See Me received a Juno Award nomination for Adult Contemporary Album of the Year at the Juno Awards of 2022.

In addition to his solo recordings, Anthony has also performed as a member of the bands Eh440 and Samantha Martin & Delta Sugar, and has had musical theatre roles in touring national productions of Love Train and Red Rock Diner. He was a credited co-writer of Priyanka's single "Bitch I'm Busy", from the Taste Test EP.

In 2023, he participated in an all-star recording of Serena Ryder's single "What I Wouldn't Do", which was released as a charity single to benefit Kids Help Phone's Feel Out Loud campaign for youth mental health.

In 2024, he played the role of Mona in the Sudbury Theatre Centre's production of Chicago.

He is out as gay.
