= Priyanka (drag queen) =

Canadian drag performer and television personality

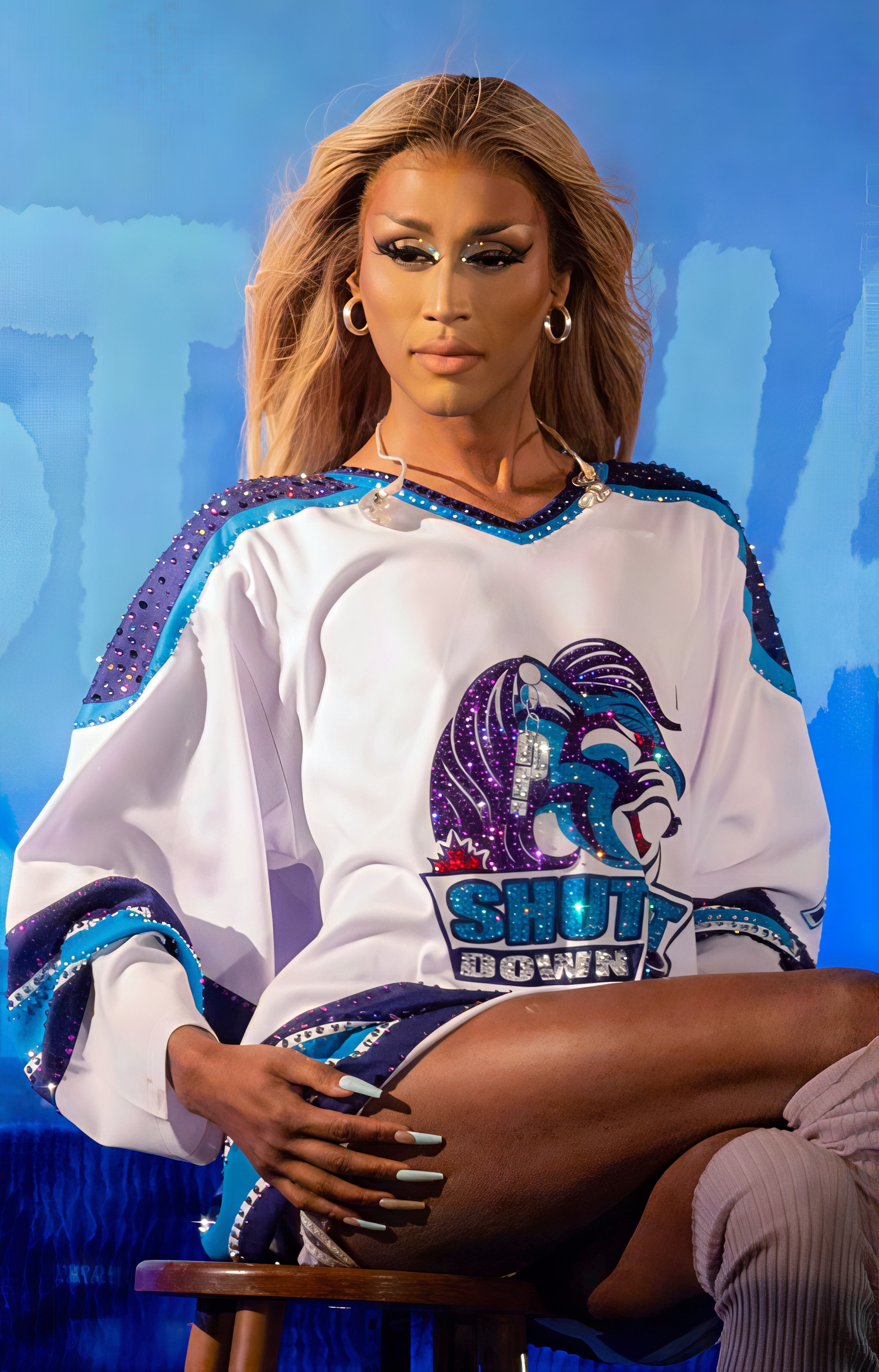
- Priyanka during the Devastatia Tour, 2024
- Born: Mark Suknanan; May 28, 1991 (age 35); Whitby, Ontario, Canada
- Other names: Mark Suki; Priyanka Love
- Education: Niagara College (OCAD)
- Occupations: Singer; Television personality; Drag Queen
- Website: Official website

Mark Suknanan (born May 28, 1991) is a Canadian singer, television personality and drag queen. Competing under his drag name, Priyanka, Suknanan won the first season of the reality competition series Canada's Drag Race in 2020. He was previously a host of the YTV children's series The Zone and the YTV reality competition series The Next Star, where he went by Mark Suki. His first EP, Taste Test, was released in 2021.

== Early life ==
Suknanan was born on May 28, 1991, in Whitby, Ontario. He attended All Saints Catholic Secondary School, where his teacher belittled him telling him he would never be successful. He came out as gay to his mother at age 23. He is of Indo-Guyanese descent. Suknanan is an alumnus of Niagara College's broadcasting program.

== Career ==
Suknanan began his career as a host in children's television, most notably on YTV's The Zone and as the web host of the YTV reality competition series The Next Star.

Suknanan began performing as a drag queen in 2017, initially under the name Priyanka Love, in Toronto clubs. Her first competition in drag was for a local contest at the suggestion of fellow drag queen Xtacy Love, where she placed fourth. She quickly found success in the local drag scene, winning numerous titles, including Miss Crews and Tangos (2018–2019) and Woody's Queen of Halloween (2018). Priyanka was voted Toronto's best queen in Now's annual reader poll in 2019. Speaking about her rise to fame, Suknanan said: "I went from zero to 100 ... I came into drag so hard and built up a name so quickly that it just kind of became routine." Priyanka has also performed as Mel B in a Spice Girls drag tribute act, alongside her Canada's Drag Race castmate Juice Boxx as Emma Bunton.

In 2020, Priyanka was a contestant on the inaugural season of the reality competition series Canada's Drag Race, ultimately winning the competition over finalists Scarlett BoBo and Rita Baga. She became the first person of Indo-Caribbean descent to win in the franchise's global history. Although she was already out as gay to her mother, she only came out to her father right around the time of the series.

Throughout the season, her narrative included a running gag that the contrast between personas, as both established television personality Mark Suki by day and drag queen Priyanka by night, made her Canada's Hannah Montana; for Fierté Montréal's special online edition of its annual Drag Superstars show, which featured all of the Canada's Drag Race queens in prerecorded video performances, Priyanka performed to the Hannah Montana theme song "The Best of Both Worlds". She was also featured in Pride Toronto's online Drag Ball on June 27, 2020, performing to Marina and the Diamonds' single "Power & Control".

At the 9th Canadian Screen Awards in 2021, she received a nomination for Best Supporting Performance in a Web Program or Series for her Drag Ball appearance, and was one of the ten nominees for the fan-voted Audience Choice Award, as well as serving as the narrator of the livestream presentation for lifestyle and reality categories on May 17.

Following the conclusion of the season, she headlined a cross-Canada tour with the other Canada's Drag Race contestants, which was performed at drive-in venues due to the ongoing social distancing restrictions remaining in place during the COVID-19 pandemic in Canada. In October, she participated alongside Scarlett Bobo, Rita Baga and Jimbo in an online panel discussion as part of the Just for Laughs festival. Priyanka was featured on the cover of Gay Times digital issue, her first magazine cover. In November and December 2020, Priyanka appeared as the celebrity spokesperson in a Canadian advertising campaign for SodaStream. She has also starred in online advertising campaigns for Shoppers Drug Mart and the Bank of Montreal.

In April 2021, she was announced as the host of the 2021 virtual edition of Pride Toronto. In May 2021, she partnered with Vizzy Hard Seltzer, serving as community impact director. In August 2021, they were a featured performer in Drag Fest, a live music festival. She also co-hosted the Forever Dog podcast Famous This Week alongside Brooke Lynn Hytes, which won a Canadian Podcasting Award in 2022.

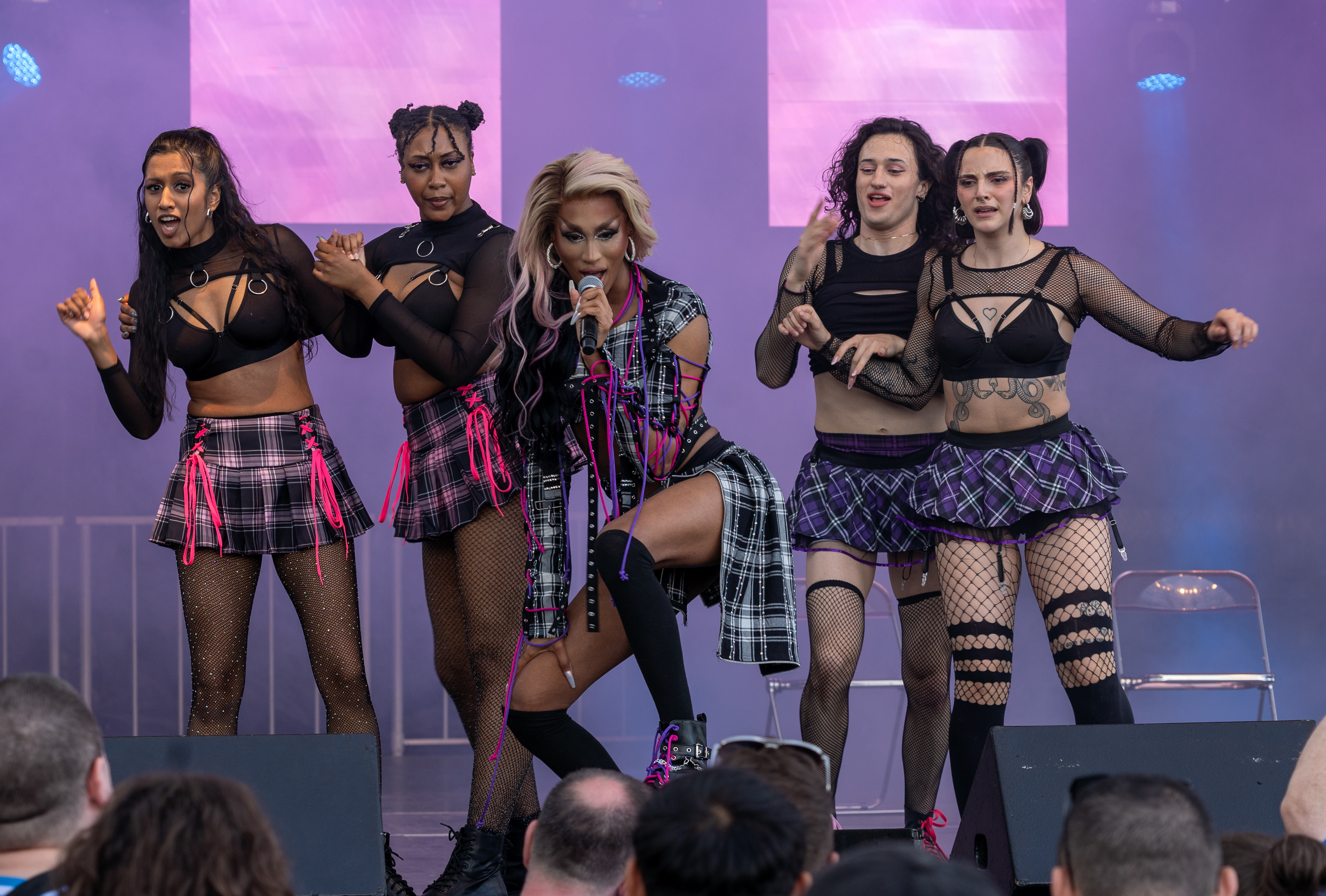
Priyanka performing in 2024

In July 2021, Priyanka released her debut music project, the EP Taste Test. which surpassed 16 million streams, as of January 2024. In addition, Priyanka was featured on the July/August 2021 edition of Elle Canada, becoming the first drag queen to do so. In November 2021, Priyanka was named as a co-host with Lindsay Ell of the 2021 Canadian Country Music Awards. Priyanka released the country music single "Country Queen", which she performed during the opening number of the award ceremony. In December 2021, Priyanka appeared on season 2 of Canada's Drag Race as a guest, to crown her successor. The look that she wore was dubbed one of the best looks across the entire Drag Race franchise.

In February 2023, Suknanan signed a development deal with Bell Media on potential future television or film projects, also joining CTV's eTalk as a special correspondent. She was featured as the "lip-sync assassin" of the tenth episode of the eighth season of RuPaul's Drag Race All Stars, where she beat Kandy Muse in a lipsync to Destiny's Child's "Jumpin', Jumpin'". In July 2023, it was announced that Priyanka, alongside Sasha Velour and Jaida Essence Hall, would be the new hosts for the upcoming fourth season of the Emmy winning reality television series We're Here.

In June 2024, Priyanka's first Bell Media project, a reality series called Drag Brunch Saved My Life, in which she visits struggling restaurants to help them reinvent themselves by launching drag brunch shows, was announced as premiering on Crave in the 2024-25 television season.

In November 2024, Priyanka hosted the inaugural PTP Pink Awards ceremony.

In January 2025, Priyanka was made honorary WWE Women’s Champion by WWE Hall of Famer, Trish Stratus.

In February 2026, Priyanka was announced as a main judge on Canada's Drag Race All Stars alongside Brooke Lynn Hytes and Jimbo. This makes this panel the first all-drag queen judging panel in Drag Race history.

== Filmography ==
=== Film ===
Year	Title	Role	Notes	Ref.
2024	Meet Me Next Christmas	Herself		
2023	It's All Sunshine and Rainbows	Melonie Sunshine		
2026	The Last Whale Singer	Ora	(voice)	

=== Television ===
Year	Title	Role	Notes	Ref.
2013–2014	The Next Star	Himself	Host	
2013–2019	The Zone	Himself	Host	
2015	Katie Chats	Himself		
2015	Kids Choice Awards Countdown	Himself	Host	
2020–2021	Canada's Drag Race	Herself	Season 1; winner Season 2; guest	
2022	Ezra	Herself		
2022	Canada's Drag Race: Canada vs. the World	Herself	Season 1; guest judge	
2023–present	eTalk	Herself	Special contributor	
2023	Bollywed	Herself		
2023	Glamorous	Herself	Cameo	
2023	RuPaul's Drag Race All Stars	Lip Sync Assassin	Season 8; Episode: "The Letter L"	
2023	RuPaul's Drag Race All Stars: Untucked	Herself	Episode: "All Stars Untucked: The Letter L"	
2023	Sew Fierce	Herself	Guest	
2024	We're Here	Herself	Main cast	
2025	Drag Brunch Saved My Life	Herself	Host	
2026	Canada's Drag Race All Stars	Herself	Main judge	
2027	Heated Rivalry †	Tarek	Season 2	

=== Music videos ===
Year	Title	Artist	Ref.
2018	"Say My Name"	Herself	
2019	"You Look So Good"	Herself	
2020	"Power & Control" (unofficial)	Marina and the Diamonds	
2021	"Do Better"	Anjulie	
2021	"GAP"	Heidi N Closet	
2021	"Montero (Call Me by Your Name)"	Herself	
2021	"Queen of the North"	Brooke Lynn Hytes (featuring Priyanka)	
2021	"Cake"	Herself	
2021	"Bitch I'm Busy"	Herself	
2021	"Come Through" (featuring Lemon)	Herself	
2022	"Snatch" (featuring Cheryl Hole)	Herself	

=== Web series ===
Year	Title	Role	Notes	Ref(s)
2021–22	The Pit Stop	Herself	Guest, 2 episodes	
2021	What's My Game?	Herself	Host	
2021	Out of the Closet	Herself	Episode: "Priyanka: Canada for Christmas"	
2022	Bring Back My Girls	Herself		

== Discography ==
=== Albums ===
Title	Details
Devastatia	Released: August 23, 2024; Label: Question Mark Productions; Format: streaming, digital download

=== Extended plays ===
Title	Details
Taste Test	Released: July 16, 2021; Label: Question Mark Productions; Format: streaming, digital download

=== Singles ===
==== As lead artist ====
Title	Year	Album
"Say My Name"	2018	Non-album singles
"You Look So Good"	2019	Non-album singles
"Watermelon Sugar"	2021	Non-album singles
"Montero (Call Me By Your Name)"	2021	Non-album singles
"On the Ground"	2021	Non-album singles
"Cake"	2021	Taste Test
"Bitch I'm Busy"	2021	Taste Test
"Come Through" (featuring Lemon)	2021	Taste Test
"Country Queen"	2021	Non-album singles
"Sleigh My Name"	2021	Non-album singles
"My Only Wish (This Year)" (with Tia Kofi)	2022	Non-album singles
"Sleigh My Name" (remix with Shea Couleé, Alaska Thunderfuck, and Lemon)	2022	Non-album singles
"Bad Bitches Don't Cry" (with Ralph)	2023	Devastatia
"No New Friends"	2024	Devastatia
"Shut It Down"	2024	Devastatia
"Gucciyanka" (featuring Lemon)	2024	Devastatia

==== As featured artist ====
Title	Year	Album
"Not Sorry Aboot It" (with The Cast of Canada's Drag Race, Season 1)	2020	Non-album singles
"U Wear It Well" – Queens of the North Ru-Mix (RuPaul featuring the Cast of Canada's Drag Race, Season 1)	2020	Non-album singles
"Queen of the North" (Brooke Lynn Hytes featuring Priyanka)	2021	Non-album singles
"Snatched" (Bonnie McKee featuring Priyanka)	2024	Hot City

== Awards and nominations ==
Year	Award	Category	Work	Result	Ref.
2021	Canadian Screen Awards	Best Supporting Performance in a Web Program or Series	Canada's Drag Race	Nominated	
2021	Canadian Screen Awards	Audience Choice Award	Canada's Drag Race	Nominated	
2024	Canadian Screen Awards	Best Host, talk show or entertainment news	eTalk (with Tyrone Edwards, Elaine Lui, Traci Melchor, Chloe Wilde, Sonia Mangat and Liz Trinnear)	Nominated	
2026	Canadian Screen Awards	Best Lifestyle Program or Series	Drag Brunch Saved My Life with Daniel Birnbaum, Justin Stockman, Bruno Dubé, Marlo Miazga, Kim Bondi, Corinna Lehr	Won	
2026	Canadian Screen Awards	Best Host in a Lifestyle Program or Series	Drag Brunch Saved My Life	Won	
2022	Canadian Podcasting Awards	Outstanding Foreign Series	Famous This Week	Won	
2022	UK Music Video Awards	Best Hair & Make-Up in a Video	"Come Through"	Won	

Preceded by Inaugural	Winner of Canada's Drag Race; Canada season 1	Succeeded by Icesis Couture
