= VeraCity =

Canadian television series

VeraCity is a Canadian television series, which premiered in 2020 on Citytv. The series, generally airing six times per year, airs documentaries produced by either Citytv's news division or independent producers.

== Episodes ==
=== Season One ===
No.	Title	Directed by	Written by	Original release date
1	"Going Viral"	Unknown	Unknown	September 20, 2020
2	"Unrepentant"	Unknown	Unknown	October 19, 2020
3	"The Psychedelic Frontier"	Pat Taney	Pat Taney	January 24, 2021
4	"In Their Own Words"	Ci Ci Fan	Unknown	February 21, 2021
5	"The Fight for Tomorrow"	Unknown	Megan Robinson	March 29, 2021
6	"The Gun Chase"	Cristina Howorun	Cristina Howorun	April 26, 2021

=== Season Two ===
No.	Title	Directed by	Written by	Original release date
1	"Fighting Traffick"	Tara Hughes	Cristina Howorun	October 25, 2021
2	"Thoroughly Modern Families"	Pat Taney	Unknown	January 29, 2022
3	"Maid in Canada"	Adrian Ghobrial	Unknown	February 26, 2022
4	"Breaking Brethren"	Alec MacIntosh	Unknown	March 26, 2022
5	"Yonge Street Riot"	Richard B. Pierre	Richard B. Pierre	April 30, 2022
6	"The Broken Normal"	Unknown	Unknown	August 13, 2022

=== Season Three ===
No.	Title	Directed by	Written by	Original release date
1	"The Bitcoin Kid"	Unknown	Pat Taney	January 28, 2023
2	"The Long Road Home"	Alex MacIntosh	Cristina Howorun	February 25, 2023
3	"Indigiqueer"	Sarain Fox	Unknown	March 25, 2023
4	"What's in a Name"	Unknown	Unknown	April 25, 2023
5	"Prison Moms"	Matt Gallagher	Cristina Howorun	May 27, 2023
6	"You've Been Posted"	Alex Bailey	Alex Bailey	June 24, 2023

=== Season Four ===
No.	Title	Directed by	Written by	Original release date
1	"Make Me Look Pretty"	Alex McIntosh	Pat Taney	January 27, 2024
2	"The Disappearance of Layton Keddy"	Unknown	Unknown	February 24, 2024
3	"Debt to Society"	Cristina Howorun	Cristina Howorun	August 25, 2024
4	TBA	TBD	TBD	2024
5	TBA	TBD	TBD	2024
6	"My Fake Billionaire Boyfriend"	Cristina Howorun	Cristina Howorun	November 30, 2025

== Awards ==
Award / Film Festival	Date of ceremony	Category	Recipient(s)	Result	Ref(s)
Canadian Screen Awards	2024	Best Host or Interviewer, News or Information Program or Series	Sarain Fox "Indigiqueer"	Won	
