= Canada's Drag Race: Canada vs. the World season 2 =

2024 season of Canada's Drag Race: Canada vs. the World

Canada's Drag Race: Canada vs. the World
- Season 2
- Promotional poster for season two
- Hosted by: Brooke Lynn Hytes
- Judges: Brooke Lynn Hytes; Brad Goreski; Traci Melchor
- No. of contestants: 9
- Winner: Lemon
- Runner-up: Alexis Mateo
- Miss Congeniality: Eureka!
- No. of episodes: 6

Release
- Original network: Crave (Canada); BBC Three (United Kingdom); WOW Presents Plus (International)
- Original release: July 19 – August 23, 2024

Season chronology
- ← Previous; Season 1

The second season of Canada's Drag Race: Canada vs. the World premiered on July 19, 2024, on Crave in Canada and WOW Presents Plus internationally. Brooke Lynn Hytes acts as the host and main judge, with Brad Goreski and Traci Melchor as supporting judges.

The contestants for the season were announced on June 26, 2024 and feature queens who previously competed on the Canadian, American, British, and French versions of the franchise as well as the related spin-off RuPaul's Drag Race: UK vs. the World. Nine queens competed for the title of "Queen of the Mother-Pucking World" and a cash prize of $100,000.

The winner of the second season of Canada's Drag Race: Canada vs. The World was Lemon, with Alexis Mateo as the runner-up. As the winner of the season, Lemon won a cash prize of $100,000 and earned the title "Queen of the Motherpucking World".

Eureka! earned the title of ‘Miss Congeniality’ and took home a cash prize of $10,000.

== Production ==
The season was announced on June 6, 2023 and was announced in December 2023 that it would air in 2024 along with Canada's Drag Race season 5. Brooke Lynn Hytes, Brad Goreski, and Traci Melchor would reprise their roles from the first season. The cast was teased on June 24, 2024 and announced on June 26.

== Contestants ==
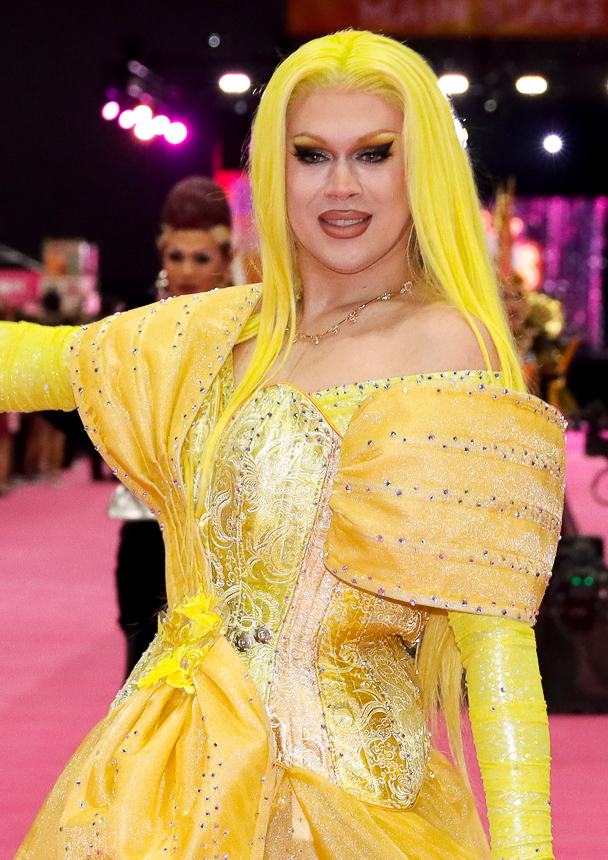
The winner, Lemon.

Ages, names, and cities stated are at time of filming.

Contestants of Canada's Drag Race: Canada vs. the World season 2 and their backgrounds
Contestant	Age	Hometown	Original season(s)	Original placement(s)	Outcome
Lemon	28	Toronto, Canada	Canada season 1	5th place	Winner
Lemon	28	Toronto, Canada	UK vs. the World series 1	9th place	Winner
Alexis Mateo	44	Las Vegas, United States	US season 3	3rd place	Runner-up
Alexis Mateo	44	Las Vegas, United States	All Stars 1	5th place	Runner-up
Alexis Mateo	44	Las Vegas, United States	All Stars 5	5th place	Runner-up
Cheryl (Note: Cheryl is referred to as Cheryl Hole on UK series 1 and UK vs. the World series 1.)	30	Chelmsford, United Kingdom	UK series 1	4th place	3rd place
Cheryl	30	Chelmsford, United Kingdom	UK vs. the World series 1	8th place	3rd place
Kennedy Davenport	43	Dallas, United States	US season 7	4th place	3rd place
Kennedy Davenport	43	Dallas, United States	All Stars 3	Runner-up	3rd place
Miss Fiercalicious	27	Toronto, Canada	Canada season 3	4th place	5th place
Eureka! (Note: Eureka O'Hara is referred to as Eureka on US seasons 9 and 10, and as Eureka! on All Stars 6 and this one.)	33	Los Angeles, United States	US season 9	11th place (Note: The contestant was removed from the competition due to medical reasons.)	6th place (Note: Eureka! was voted Miss Congeniality.)
Eureka!	33	Los Angeles, United States	US season 10	Runner-up	6th place
Eureka!	33	Los Angeles, United States	All Stars 6	Runner-up	6th place
Tynomi Banks	42	Toronto, Canada	Canada season 1	9th place	7th place
Le Fil	38	Brighouse, United Kingdom	UK series 4	7th place	8th place
La Kahena	31	Paris, France	France season 1	10th place	9th place

== Contestant progress ==
Legend:

Lemon won Canada's Drag Race: Canada vs. the World season 2.
Alexis Mateo was the runner-up.
Eureka! was voted Miss Congeniality (Miss C).
WIN indicates that the contestant won the challenge.
SAFE indicates that the contestant was declared safe by the judges.
BVR (Beaver) indicates that the contestant received the Golden Beaver and was saved from the bottom three.
BTM (Bottom) indicates that the contestant was up for elimination.
ELIM (Eliminated) indicates that the contestant was eliminated.
Guest indicates that the contestant returned as a guest.

Contestants progress with placements in each episode
Contestant	Episode					
Contestant	1	2	3	4	5	6
Lemon	WIN	SAFE	SAFE	SAFE	WIN	Winner
Alexis Mateo	BVR	SAFE	WIN	BVR	BTM	Runner-up
Cheryl	SAFE	SAFE	BTM	SAFE	SAFE	Eliminated
Kennedy Davenport	SAFE	WIN	BVR	WIN	BVR	Eliminated
Miss Fiercalicious	SAFE	BVR	SAFE	BTM	ELIM	Guest
Eureka!	BTM	SAFE	SAFE	ELIM		Miss C
Tynomi Banks	SAFE	BTM	ELIM			Guest
Le Fil	SAFE	ELIM				Guest
La Kahena	ELIM					Guest

== Lip syncs ==
Legend:

The contestant was eliminated after their first time in the bottom.
The contestant was eliminated after their second time in the bottom.
The contestant won the first round of the Lip Sync Smackdown for the Crown and advanced to the final lip sync.
The contestant won the second round of the Lip Sync Smackdown for the Crown and was declared the winner of the season.

Episode	Bottom contestants			Song	Eliminated
1	Eureka!	vs.	La Kahena	"Meaningless" (Charlotte Cardin)	La Kahena
2	Le Fil	vs.	Tynomi Banks	"Let Me Think About It" (Ida Corr, Fedde Le Grand)	Le Fil
3	Cheryl	vs.	Tynomi Banks	"What the Hell" (Avril Lavigne)	Tynomi Banks
4	Eureka!	vs.	Miss Fiercalicious	"Hush Hush; Hush Hush" (The Pussycat Dolls)	Eureka!
5	Alexis Mateo	vs.	Miss Fiercalicious	“How Far I'll Go" (Alessia Cara)	Miss Fiercalicious
Episode	Finalists			Song	Winner
6	Kennedy Davenport	vs.	Lemon	"Hideaway" (Kiesza)	Lemon
6	Alexis Mateo	vs.	Cheryl	"So Many Men, So Little Time" (Miquel Brown)	Alexis Mateo
6	Alexis Mateo	vs.	Lemon	"Love Can Move Mountains" (Celine Dion)	Lemon

== Golden Beaver ==
Legend:

The contestant won the Maxi Challenge and possessed the Golden Beaver to save one of the queens in the bottom.
The contestant received the power of the Golden Beaver and was saved from the bottom.

Episode	Beaver Gifter	Bottom Queens	Saved
1	Lemon	Alexis Mateo, Eureka! and La Kahena	Alexis Mateo
2	Kennedy Davenport	Le Fil, Miss Fiercalicious and Tynomi Banks	Miss Fiercalicious
3	Alexis Mateo	Cheryl, Kennedy Davenport and Tynomi Banks	Kennedy Davenport
4	Kennedy Davenport	Alexis Mateo, Eureka! and Miss Fiercalicious	Alexis Mateo
5	Lemon	Alexis Mateo, Kennedy Davenport and Miss Fiercalicious	Kennedy Davenport

== Guest judges ==
- Charlotte Cardin, singer
- Lisa Rinna, actress and television personality
- Kirk Pickersgill, fashion designer
- Samantha Bee, comedian and writer
- Sarain Fox, activist
- Alessia Cara, singer-songwriter
- Ra'Jah O'Hara, contestant from RuPaul's Drag Race Season 11, runner-up of All Stars 6, and winner of Canada vs. the World Season 1

=== Special guests ===
Guests who appeared in episodes, but did not judge on the main stage.

==== Episode 5 ====
- Hollywood Jade, dancer and choreographer

== Episodes ==
No. overall	No. in season	Title	Original release date
7	1	"Drag Pop"	July 19, 2024
Nine queens from across the Drag Race franchise enter the competition. Brooke Lynn Hytes informs them that, for the first main challenge, the queens must write, record and perform verses for one of three original songs. The queens are ordered randomly in order to select their song, which they will perform in groups of three. Brooke also announces the return of the Golden Beaver twist first used in Canada's Drag Race season 4, where the challenge winner can save one of the bottom three from lip-syncing for their life. The queens' songs and groups are as follows: "BOPulence" performed by Just Divas - Alexis Mateo, Eureka! and La Kahena; "This Beat" performed by The Face - Le Fil, Miss Fiercalicious and Tynomi Banks; "Tongue Pop" performed by The Slapbacks - Cheryl, Kennedy Davenport and Lemon; On the runway, category is Wonders of the World. Cheryl, Kennedy Davenport and Lemon receive positive critiques with Lemon winning the challenge. Alexis Mateo, Eureka! and La Kahena receive negative critiques and are the bottom three. Lemon uses the Golden Beaver to save Alexis Mateo from the bottom two. Eureka! and La Kahena lip-sync to "Meaningless" by Charlotte Cardin. Eureka! wins the lip-sync and La Kahena sashays away.: Guest Judge: Charlotte Cardin; Main Challenge: Write, record and perform verses for original songs in groups of three; Runway Theme: Wonders of the World; Challenge Winner: Lemon; Bottom Two: Eureka! and La Kahena; Lip-Sync Song: "Meaningless" by Charlotte Cardin; Eliminated: La Kahena; Farewell Message: "Twice the Porkchop But 1 new family Love you sisters Enjoy ❤️"
8	2	"The Hole"	July 26, 2024
For this week's main challenge, the queens must improvise in the reality TV spoof The Hole, inspired by The Mole and The Traitors. The queens each choose a reality TV archetype to portray: Alexis Mateo as The Total Karen; Cheryl as The Super Fan; Eureka! as The Soap Opera Star; Kennedy Davenport as The Know-It-All; Le Fil as The Girl Looking for Love; Lemon as The Gay Guy; Miss Fiercalicious as The Petty Bitch; Tynomi Banks as The Kooky Clairvoyant; On the runway, category is Mother Nature. Cheryl, Kennedy Davenport and Lemon receive positive critiques with Kennedy Davenport winning the challenge. Le Fil, Miss Fiercalicious, and Tynomi Banks receive negative critiques and are the bottom three. Kennedy Davenport uses the Golden Beaver to save Miss Fiercalicious from the bottom two. Le Fil and Tynomi Banks lip-sync to "Let Me Think About It" by Ida Corr and Fedde Le Grand. Tynomi Banks wins the lip-sync and Le Fil sashays away.: Guest Judge: Lisa Rinna; Main Challenge: Improvise in the reality TV spoof The Hole; Runway Theme: Mother Nature; Challenge Winner: Kennedy Davenport; Bottom Two: Le Fil and Tynomi Banks; Lip-Sync Song: "Let Me Think About It" by Ida Corr and Fedde Le Grand; Eliminated: Le Fil; Farewell Message: "This Beat... Iconic. 😉 This is Art, Love. Le Fil x"
9	3	"Glamorous Drag Queen Ball Challenge"	August 2, 2024
For this week's mini challenge, the queens participate in a motion capture audition for a fictional film. Alexis Mateo wins the mini challenge. For this week's main challenge the queens must showcase three looks for the Glamorous Drag Queen Ball Challenge. The three themes are: AI Generated Queen, The Robots Have Taken Over, and Supermodel of the New World. The latter look must be constructed in the Workroom. After the runway, Alexis Mateo, Lemon, and Miss Fiercalicious receive positive critiques with Alexis Mateo winning the challenge. Cheryl, Kennedy Davenport, and Tynomi Banks receive negative critiques and are the bottom three. Alexis Mateo uses the Golden Beaver to save Kennedy Davenport from the bottom two. Cheryl and Tynomi Banks lip-sync to "What the Hell" by Avril Lavigne. Cheryl wins the lip-sync and Tynomi Banks sashays away.: Guest Judge: Kirk Pickersgill; Mini Challenge: Participate in a motion capture film audition; Mini Challenge Winner: Alexis Mateo; Main Challenge: Showcase three looks for the Glamorous Drag Queen Ball Challenge; Runway Themes: AI Generated Queen, The Robots Have Taken Over, and Supermodel of the New World; Challenge Winner: Alexis Mateo; Bottom Two: Cheryl and Tynomi Banks; Lip-Sync Song: "What the Hell" by Avril Lavigne; Eliminated: Tynomi Banks; Farewell Message: "CANADA YOU BETTER WIN 💋"
10	4	"Reading Battles"	August 9, 2024
For this week's mini challenge, the queens each lip-sync to "Just What They Want" by RuPaul while being blasted by a high powered fan. Miss Fiercalicious wins the mini challenge. For this week's main challenge, the queens must perform a stand-up routine in front of the judges and the audience by telling jokes about each others in pairs. The judges select a winner and a loser from each pair; the winner placed on top, whereas the loser was up for elimination.: Round 1: Lemon vs Miss Fiercalicious; Round 2: Cheryl vs Eureka!; Round 3: Alexis Mateo vs Kennedy Davenport; Lemon, Cheryl and Kennedy Davenport were the winners of the battles, with Kennedy Davenport selected this week's maxi challenge winner. Alexis Mateo, Eureka!, and Miss Fiercalicious were the bottom three queens; Kennedy Davenport uses the Golden Beaver to save Alexis Mateo from the bottom two. Eureka! and Miss Fiercalicious lip-sync to "Hush Hush; Hush Hush" by The Pussycat Dolls. Miss Fiercalicious wins the lip-sync and Eureka! sashays away.: Guest Judges: Samantha Bee and Sarain Fox; Mini Challenge: Lip sync to "Just What They Want" by RuPaul while being blasted by a high powered fan; Mini Challenge Winner: Miss Fiercalicious; Main Challenge: Reading Battles; Challenge Winner: Kennedy Davenport; Bottom Two: Eureka! and Miss Fiercalicious; Lip-Sync Song: "Hush Hush; Hush Hush" by The Pussycat Dolls; Eliminated: Eureka!; Farewell Message: "First, 2nd and... Cheryl: you are so funny and fuck the old runs on DR this is YOU!! Kennedy: Icon Legend real sis you will be the best for me Alexis - BAM! Finally the notice you truly deserve on DR! They messed up not making you lipsync before the finale! Lemon - You Ate! and Bitch its not rigged you are slaying ╭ᑎ╮ My #1 Ms. Fierce - Dolly wop this Hoes for me and take the negative narrative from your head cause you'll be in the Finale. DO IT FOR ME Your 0, Leaving like a 10 (🍆 4 your horny Hoes) Eureka 👑🐘"
11	5	"Snatch Game: The Rusical"	August 16, 2024
For this week's main challenge, the queens performed in Snatch Game: The Rusical, inspired by the classic Drag Race challenge. The queens' impersonations were as follows: Alexis Mateo as Ron DeSantis (as a baby); Cheryl as Queen Victoria; Kennedy Davenport as Tabitha Brown; Lemon as Susan Boyle; Miss Fiercalicious as Mother Teresa; On the runway, category is Summer of '69. Cheryl and Lemon receive positive critiques with Lemon winning the challenge. Alexis Mateo, Kennedy Davenport, and Miss Fiercalicious receive negative critiques and are the bottom three. Lemon uses the Golden Beaver to save Kennedy Davenport from the bottom two. Alexis Mateo and Miss Fiercalicious lip-sync to "How Far I'll Go (Alessia Cara Version)" by Alessia Cara. Alexis Mateo wins the lip-sync and Miss Fiercalicious sashays away.: Guest Judges: Alessia Cara and Sarain Fox; Main Challenge: Impersonate a celebrity and perform a musical number in Snatch Game: The Rusical; Runway Theme: Summer of '69; Challenge Winner: Lemon; Bottom Two: Alexis Mateo and Miss Fiercalicious; Lip-Sync Song: "How Far I'll Go (Alessia Cara Version)" by Alessia Cara; Eliminated: Miss Fiercalicious; Farewell Message: "Congrats Lemon ♡"
12	6	"Grand Finale"	August 23, 2024
All queens return for the finale, and the top four queens battle for the crown in a Lip-sync Extravaganza. Eureka! was voted as this season's Miss Congeniality. On the runway, category is Crown Me. After the judges' final critiques and appearances by the eliminated queens the lip-sync smackdown begins. The first lip-sync is between Kennedy Davenport and Lemon. They lip-sync to "Hideaway" by Kiesza. Lemon wins the lip-sync and Kennedy Davenport is eliminated. The second lip-sync is between Alexis Mateo and Cheryl. They lip-sync to "So Many Men, So Little Time" by Miquel Brown. Alexis Mateo wins the lip-sync and Cheryl is eliminated. The final lip-sync is between Alexis Mateo and Lemon. They lip-sync to "Love Can Move Mountains" by Céline Dion. Following the lip-sync it is announced that Lemon is the winner, leaving Alexis Mateo as the runner-up.: Guest Judges: Sarain Fox and Ra'Jah O'Hara; Runway Theme: Crown Me; Miss Congeniality: Eureka!; Final Four: Alexis Mateo, Cheryl, Kennedy Davenport and Lemon; Lip-Sync Smackdown #1: Kennedy Davenport vs. Lemon; Lip-Sync Song: "Hideaway" by Kiesza; Eliminated: Kennedy Davenport; Lip-Sync Smackdown #2: Alexis Mateo vs. Cheryl; Lip-Sync Song: "So Many Men, So Little Time" by Miquel Brown; Eliminated: Cheryl; Lip-Sync Smackdown #3: Alexis Mateo vs. Lemon; Lip-Sync Song: "Love Can Move Mountains" by Céline Dion; Runner-up: Alexis Mateo; Winner of Canada's Drag Race: Canada vs. the World Season Two: Lemon
