= Sarain Fox =

Canadian activist, broadcaster and filmmaker

- Citizenship: Canadian
- Occupations: Activist; broadcaster; filmmaker

Sarain Fox is a Canadian Anishinaabe activist, broadcaster and filmmaker. She is most noted for her 2020 documentary film Inendi, for which she received a Canadian Screen Award nomination for Best Host or Interviewer in a News or Information Program or Series at the 9th Canadian Screen Awards in 2021.

She has also been host of the Viceland/APTN documentary series Rise, and cohost of APTN's documentary series Future History.

In 2021 she directed Giiwewizh, a series of short documentaries about indigenous musicians which premiered at the International Indigenous Music Summit.

In 2023 she hosted Indigiqueer, a special about LGBT First Nations people, for Citytv's VeraCity documentary series, for which she won the Canadian Screen Award for Best Host or Interviewer in a News or Information Program or Series at the 12th Canadian Screen Awards in 2024.

She has appeared as a guest judge in the third, fourth, fifth and sixth seasons of Canada's Drag Race as well as the first and second seasons of Canada's Drag Race: Canada vs. the World.

== Personal life ==
Fox is from Batchewana First Nation near Sault Ste. Marie, Ontario, and grew up in Barrie. In 2022, Fox and her cousin Chelsea Brunelle travelled with their uncle, Batchewana band councillor Harvey Bell, to Quebec City to protest the visit of Pope Francis.

She is the partner of Nimkii Osawamick, a musician and dancer from Wiikwemkoong First Nation, associated with the band Nimkii and the Niniis.

== Filmography ==
Television
Year	Title	Role	Notes
2017	Rise	Herself	Host
2018-19	Future History	Herself	Co-host
2020	Inendi	Herself	Writer, Director, Producer; Television documentary
2022	Canada's Drag Race (season 3)	Herself	Guest judge; 2 episodes
2022	Canada's Drag Race: Canada vs. the World (season 1)	Herself	Guest judge
2023	VeraCity: Indigiqueer	Herself	Host; television documentary special
2024	Canada's Drag Race (season 4)	Herself	Guest judge
2024	Canada's Drag Race: Canada vs the World (season 2)	Herself	Guest judge; 3 episodes
2024	Canada's Drag Race (season 5)	Herself	Guest judge; 2 episodes
2025	Canada's Drag Race (season 6)	Herself	Alternating judge; 3 episodes
