= Inendi =

- Genre: Documentary
- Written by: Sarain Fox; Tara Barnes
- Directed by: Sarain Fox
- Starring: Mary Bell
- Country of origin: Canada
- Original language: English

Production
- Producers: Tara Barnes; Sarain Fox; Jennifer Podemski
- Cinematography: Lucas K. Labrecque
- Editor: Navin Harrilal
- Running time: 44 minutes
- Production company: Land Back Studios

Original release
- Network: CBC Gem
- Release: December 2020

Inendi is a Canadian television documentary film, directed by Sarain Fox and released in 2020. Created in part as a response to the COVID-19 pandemic in Canada and the risk that the stories and experiences of Indigenous community elders could be lost if not documented, the film documents Fox interviewing her elderly aunt, Mary Bell, about her experiences as an Indian residential school survivor.

The film's title, "Inendi", means "she is absent" in the Anishinaabemowin language. The film was originally Bell's idea; before and during the making of the film, Fox and the film's crew took careful precautions to ensure that their attempt to preserve Indigenous history did not accidentally expose the community to COVID-19.

The film premiered in December 2020 on CBC Gem, as part of the Short Docs series.

Fox received a Canadian Screen Award nomination for Best Host or Interviewer in a News or Information Program or Series at the 9th Canadian Screen Awards in 2021.
