= Juice Boxx =

Canadian drag performer

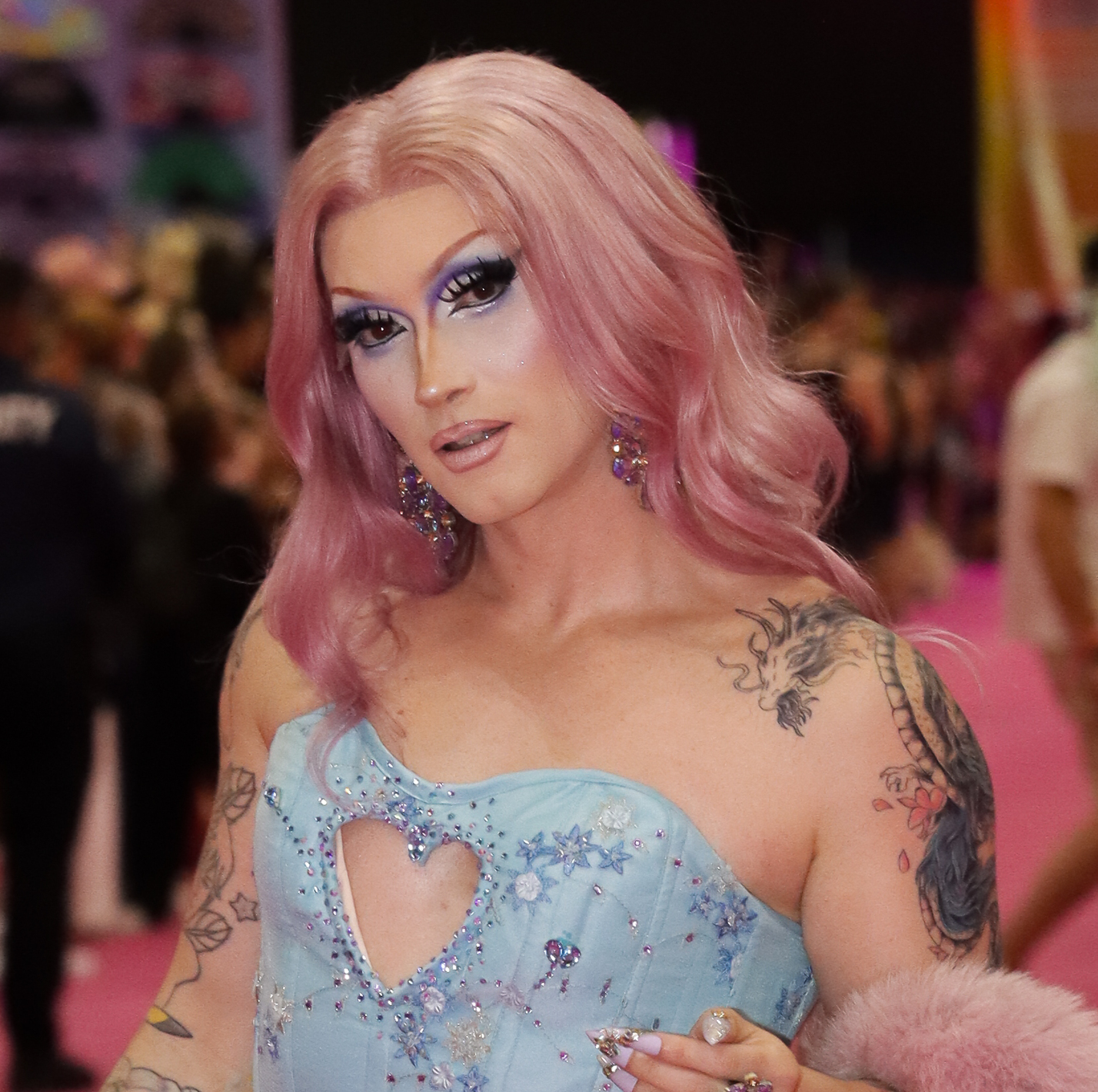
- Juice Boxx at RuPaul's DragCon LA, 2024
- Born: Joseph Primeau; September 20, 1988 (age 37); Windsor, Ontario, Canada
- Other name: Jo Primeau
- Occupations: Drag queen, entertainer
- Known for: Canada's Drag Race (season 1)

Joseph Primeau, better known by the stage name Juice Boxx (born September 20, 1988), is a Canadian drag performer best known for being the first contestant to be eliminated on Canada's Drag Race, the Canadian version of RuPaul's Drag Race. She later returned to compete on Canada's Drag Race All Stars.

== Early life ==
Primeau was born in Windsor and grew up in Essex. He has a degree in visual arts and a diploma in makeup artistry and special effects.

== Career ==
Juice Boxx started performing and hosting in Toronto since 2016. She frequently played the role of Baby Spice on the drag show Spice Queens Live. She has also stated that she views her drag as a form of activism, especially in the wake of the Orlando nightclub shooting in 2016.

In 2018, she gave a surprise performance at the wedding of her friends Jonny Cooper and Jon Tuttle in Muskoka. In January 2020, she performed at It's Just Drag, a drag event in Vancouver, British Columbia, whose bill included Monet X Change, Brooke Lynn Hytes, Priyanka, Tynomi Banks and Kendall Gender.

In the first episode of Canada's Drag Race, Boxx suffered a panic attack on the main stage during critiques. She later placed in the bottom two and lip synced against Lemon to Carly Rae Jepsen's "I Really Like You". She lost, which was met with debate on social media, include Shea Couleé voicing support for her. She is considered the "Porkchop" of Canada due to being the first contestant to ever be eliminated in a Drag Race series.

After the show, Boxx started a Twitch account in March 2021, where she plays various games. In May, she was in the music video for Priyanka's "Cake". In a post-victory interview with Attitude, Priyanka also named Juice Boxx as the queen from the season most deserving of an opportunity to return to the competition in a future season. In July 2021, Juice Boxx performed alongside BOA, Anastarzia Anaquway, Farra N. Hyte and TroyBoy at the inaugural Drag Starz at the Manor, a new drag event in Guelph, Ontario.

== Filmography ==
=== Television ===
- Canada's Drag Race (season 1) - 12th Place
- Canada's Drag Race: All Stars - 7th Place

=== Web series ===
- Bring Back My Girls (2022)
