= RuPaul's Drag Race: UK vs. the World series 1 =

2022 series of RuPaul's Drag Race: UK vs. the World

RuPaul's Drag Race: UK vs. the World
- Series 1
- Promotional poster for Series 1
- Hosted by: RuPaul
- Judges: RuPaul; Michelle Visage; Alan Carr; Graham Norton
- No. of contestants: 9
- Winner: Blu Hydrangea
- Runner-up: Mo Heart
- No. of episodes: 6

Release
- Original network: BBC Three / BBC iPlayer (UK); WOW Presents Plus (International)
- Original release: 1 February – 8 March 2022

Series chronology
- Next → Series 2

The first series of RuPaul's Drag Race: UK vs. the World began airing on BBC Three on 1 February 2022. RuPaul assumed the role of main host and head judge, and was joined on the judging panel by Michelle Visage, Alan Carr and Graham Norton, all of whom are judges on RuPaul's Drag Race UK.

The series concluded on 8 March 2022, in a finale that was won by Blu Hydrangea, who was previously a contestant on the first series of RuPaul's Drag Race UK.

== Contestants ==
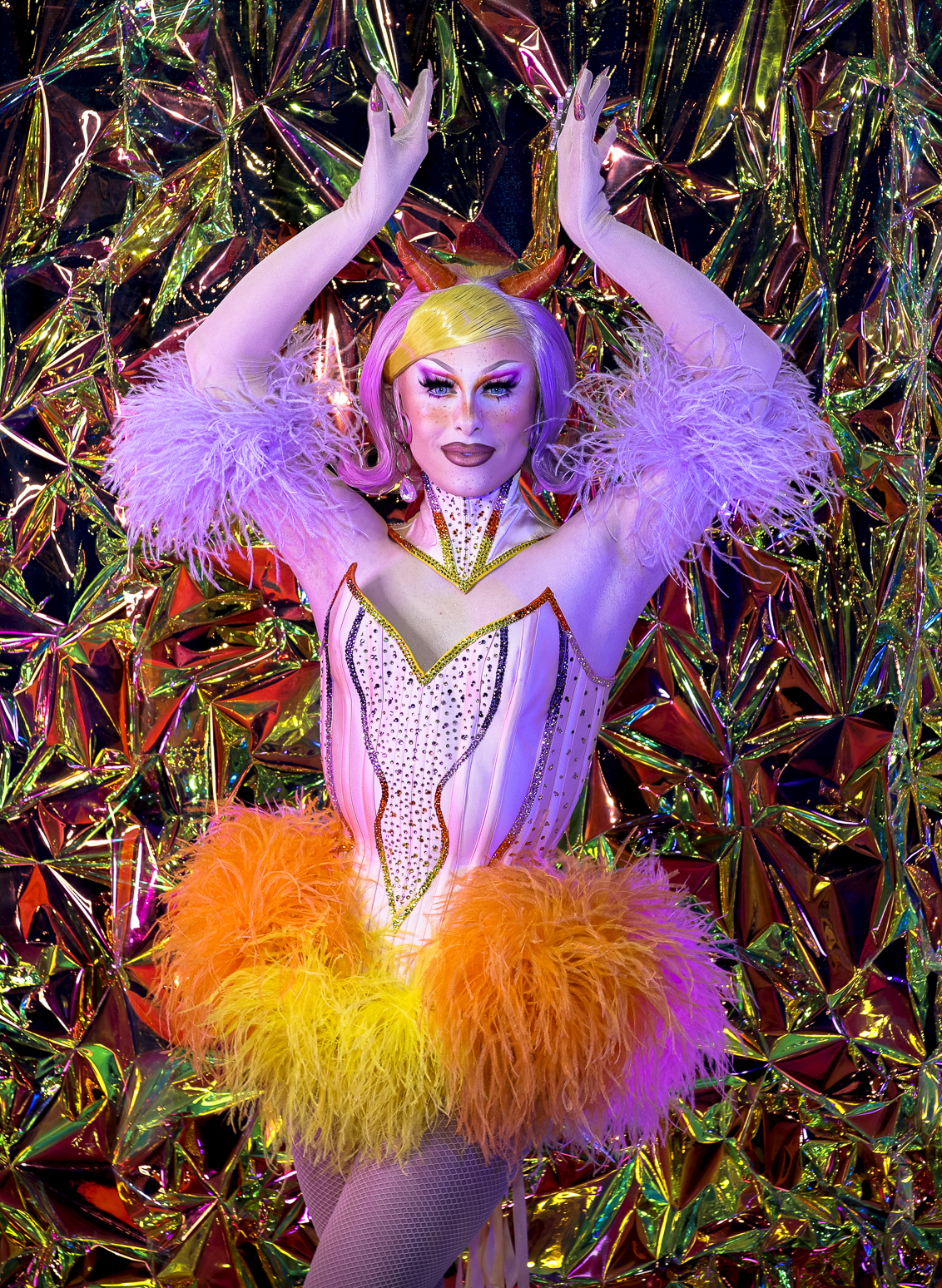
The winner of RuPaul's Drag Race: UK vs the World season 1, Blu Hydrangea.

Ages, names, and cities stated are at time of filming.

Contestants of RuPaul's Drag Race UK vs the World and their backgrounds
Contestant	Age	Hometown	Original season(s)	Original placement(s)	Outcome
Blu Hydrangea	25	Belfast, United Kingdom	UK series 1	5th place	Winner
Mo Heart (Note: Now Mo Heart, she was referred to as Monique Heart on season 10 and All Stars 4. She announced her name change in the third episode and was also used in promos for the show.)	34	Kansas City, United States	US season 10	8th place	Runner-up
Mo Heart	34	Kansas City, United States	All Stars 4	3rd place	Runner-up
Baga Chipz	31	London, United Kingdom	UK series 1	3rd place	3rd place
Jujubee	36	Boston, United States	US season 2	3rd place	3rd place
Jujubee	36	Boston, United States	All Stars 1	3rd place	3rd place
Jujubee	36	Boston, United States	All Stars 5	Runner-up	3rd place
Janey Jacké	29	Volendam, Netherlands	Holland season 1	Runner-up	5th place
Pangina Heals	32	Bangkok, Thailand	Thailand	—N/a (Note: Pangina Heals has never previously competed on a Drag Race franchise. She co-hosted both seasons of Drag Race Thailand.)	6th place
Jimbo	37	Victoria, Canada	Canada season 1	4th place	7th place
Cheryl Hole (Note: Now known simply as Cheryl.)	27	Chelmsford, United Kingdom	UK series 1	4th place	8th place
Lemon	25	New York City, United States	Canada season 1	5th place	9th place

=== Future Drag Race appearances ===
- In 2023 Jimbo competed on RuPaul's Drag Race All Stars season 8, where she won the season.
- In 2024 Cheryl Hole and Lemon competed on Canada's Drag Race: Canada vs. the World season 2, with Lemon winning the season.

== Contestant progress ==
Legend:

Blu Hydrangea won RuPaul's Drag Race: UK vs. the World series 1.
Mo Heart was the runner-up.
WIN indicates that the contestant won the challenge and the Lip Sync for the World.
TOP2 indicates that the contestant won the challenge, but lost the Lip Sync for the World.
SAFE indicates that the contestant was declared safe by the judges.
BTM (Bottom) indicates that the contestant was up for elimination.
ELIM (Eliminated) indicates that the contestant was eliminated.
Guest indicates that the contestant returned as a guest.

Contestants progress with placements in each episode
Contestant	Episode					
Contestant	1	2	3	4	5	6
Blu Hydrangea	SAFE	SAFE	SAFE	WIN	BTM	Winner
Mo Heart	SAFE	SAFE	SAFE	BTM	TOP2	Runner-up
Baga Chipz	SAFE	SAFE	SAFE	TOP2	BTM	Eliminated
Jujubee	SAFE	BTM	BTM	BTM	WIN	Eliminated
Janey Jacké	BTM	WIN	TOP2	BTM	ELIM	Guest
Pangina Heals	WIN	SAFE	WIN	ELIM		Guest
Jimbo	TOP2	TOP2	ELIM			Guest
Cheryl Hole	SAFE	ELIM				Guest
Lemon	ELIM					Guest

== Lip syncs ==
Legend:

The contestant was eliminated after their first time in the bottom.
The contestant was eliminated after their third time in the bottom.
The contestant won the first round of the Lip Sync Smackdown for the Crown and advanced to the second.
The contestant won the second round of the Lip Sync Smackdown for the Crown and was declared the winner of the season.

Episode	Contestants (Elimination)			Song	Winner	Bottom	Eliminated
1	Jimbo (Janey)	vs.	Pangina Heals (Lemon)	"Say You'll Be There" (Spice Girls)	Pangina Heals	Janey, Lemon	Lemon
2	Janey Jacké (Cheryl)	vs.	Jimbo (Jujubee)	"Supermodel (You Better Work) (El Lay Toya Jam)" (RuPaul)	Janey Jacké	Cheryl, Jujubee	Cheryl Hole
3	Janey Jacké (Jujubee)	vs.	Pangina Heals (Jimbo)	"We Like to Party! (The Vengabus)" (Vengaboys)	Pangina Heals	Jimbo, Jujubee	Jimbo
4	Baga Chipz (Pangina)	vs.	Blu Hydrangea (Pangina)	"Let It Go" (Alexandra Burke)	Blu Hydrangea	Janey, Jujubee, Mo, Pangina	Pangina Heals
5	Jujubee (Janey)	vs.	Mo Heart (Janey)	"Toy" (Netta)	Jujubee	Baga, Blu, Janey	Janey Jacké
Episode	Finalists			Song	Winner		
6	Baga Chipz	vs.	Mo Heart	"Domino" (Jessie J)	Mo Heart		
6	Blu Hydrangea	vs.	Jujubee	"The Reflex" (Duran Duran)	Blu Hydrangea		
6	Blu Hydrangea	vs.	Mo Heart	"Supernova" (Kylie Minogue)	Blu Hydrangea		

== Guest judges ==
- Melanie C, singer
- Daisy May Cooper, actress
- Jonathan Bailey, actor
- Clara Amfo, radio presenter
- Michelle Keegan, actress
- Jade Thirlwall, singer

=== Special guests ===
Guests who appeared in episodes, but did not judge on the main stage.

Episode 3

- Johannes Radebe, dancer and choreographer

Episode 4

- Katie Price, television personality

Episode 6

- Billy Porter, actor, singer, and author
- Sir Elton John, singer, pianist and composer
- Naomi Campbell, model, actress, singer, and businesswoman

== Episodes ==
No. overall	No. in series	Title	Original release date	UK viewers (millions)
1	1	"Global Glamazons"	1 February 2022	0.93
Nine queens from across the Drag Race franchise enter the competition. RuPaul informs them that for the main challenge, the queens must perform a talent show in front of the judges.: Baga Chipz - Live singing; Blu Hydrangea - Lip-syncing; Cheryl Hole - Lip-syncing; Janey Jacké - Lip-syncing/dancing; Jimbo - Bouffon; Jujubee - Live singing; Lemon - Lip-syncing; Mo Heart - Live singing; Pangina Heals - Lip-syncing; On the runway, category is "I'm a Winner, Baby". Baga Chipz, Blu Hydrangea, Jimbo and Pangina Heals receive positive critiques, with Jimbo and Pangina Heals being the Top 2 queens of the week. Janey Jacké and Lemon receive negative critiques and are the bottom two of the week. Jimbo and Pangina Heals lip-sync to "Say You'll Be There" by Spice Girls. Pangina Heals wins the lip-sync and decides to eliminate Lemon from the competition.: Guest Judge: Melanie C; Alternating Judge: Graham Norton; Main Challenge: Perform in a talent show; Runway Theme: I'm a Winner, Baby; Challenge Winners: Jimbo and Pangina Heals; Lip-Sync Song: "Say You'll Be There" by Spice Girls; Lip-Sync for The World Winner: Pangina Heals; Bottom Two: Janey Jacké and Lemon; Eliminated: Lemon; Farewell Message: "Love you All. Not a bitter Lemon, see you on tour XOXO, Lem."
2	2	"The RuPaul Ball"	8 February 2022	0.77
The queens enter the workroom and Jimbo reveals she would have sent home Janey Jacké from the competition, had she won the lip-sync. For the main challenge, the queens will design three looks for the RuPaul Ball, with categories being Kitty Girl, Butch Queen and U Wear It Well, an outfit that would make RuPaul want to wear it. On the runway, Janey Jacké, Jimbo, Mo Heart and Pangina Heals receive positive critiques, with Janey Jacké and Jimbo being the Top 2 queens of the week. Cheryl Hole and Jujubee receive negative critiques and are the bottom two queens of the week. Janey Jacké and Jimbo lip-sync to "Supermodel (You Better Work) El Lay Toya Jam" by RuPaul. Janey Jacké wins the lip-sync and decides to eliminate Cheryl Hole from the competition.: Guest Judge: Daisy May Cooper; Alternating Judge: Alan Carr; Main Challenge: The RuPaul Ball; Runway Theme: Kitty Girl, Butch Queen and U Wear It Well; Challenge Winners: Janey Jacké and Jimbo; Lip-Sync Song: "Supermodel (You Better Work) El Lay Toya Jam" by RuPaul; Lip-Sync for The World Winner: Janey Jacké; Bottom Two: Cheryl Hole and Jujubee; Eliminated: Cheryl Hole; Farewell Message: "I wasn't threatened. Still not FRETEND! Love you divas! ♡ XOXO Cheryl Hole P.S. Going for that piss now."
3	3	"West End Wendys"	15 February 2022	0.69
The queens enter the workroom and Jimbo reveals she would have sent home Jujubee from the competition, had she won the lip-sync. For this week's mini-challenge, the queens read each other to filth. Jujubee wins the mini-challenge and gets to assign the roles for the main challenge. For the main challenge, the queens performed in "West End Wendys - The Rusical".: Baga Chipz as Tracey Fatberg; Blu Hydrangea as Mariah Gon Trappy; Janey Jacké as Meryl Streep; Jimbo as Dodo the Dog; Jujubee as Lally Bowelz; Mo Heart as Dr. Spank-N-Spurter; Pangina Heals as Widdle Orphan Fannie; On the runway, category is Dot Dot Dot. Janey Jacké and Pangina Heals receive positive critiques and are the Top 2 queens of the week. Jimbo, Jujubee and Mo Heart receive negative critiques, with Jimbo and Jujubee being the bottom two queens of the week. Janey Jacké and Pangina Heals lip-sync to "We Like to Party! (The Vengabus)" by Vengaboys. Pangina Heals wins the lip-sync and decides to eliminate Jimbo from the competition.: Guest Judge: Jonathan Bailey; Alternating Judge: Graham Norton; Mini Challenge: Reading is Fundamental; Mini Challenge Winner: Jujubee; Main Challenge: West End Wendys - The Rusical; Runway Theme: Dot Dot Dot; Challenge Winners: Janey Jacké and Pangina Heals; Lip-Sync Song: "We Like to Party! (The Vengabus)" by Vengaboys; Lip-Sync for The World Winner: Pangina Heals; Bottom Two: Jimbo and Jujubee; Eliminated: Jimbo; Farewell Message: "MY NAME IS PANGINA AND I'M A STUPID IDIOT. P.S. LOVE YOU ALL. P.P.S. EXCEPT JIMBO. "
4	4	"Snatch Game"	22 February 2022	0.75
The queens enter the workroom and Janey Jacké reveals she would have sent home Jujubee from the competition, had she won the lip-sync. For this week's main challenge, the queens will play the Snatch Game. As a twist, the queens will be playing in families, captained by Michelle Visage and Katie Price. The cast consisted of: Team Katie Price: Baga Chipz as Kathy Bates (in character as Annie Wilkes from her film Misery); Jujubee as Cher; Pangina Heals as Mariah Carey; Team Michelle Visage: Blu Hydrangea as Mike Myers (in character as Austin Powers and Dr. Evil); Janey Jacké as James Charles; Mo Heart as Billy Porter; On the runway, category is Luck Be A Lady. Baga Chipz and Blu Hydrangea are announced the Top 2 queens of the week. RuPaul then announces from here on out, the queens that are not in the Top 2 for the week, they are automatically in the bottom and are at risk of getting eliminated. Janey Jacké, Jujubee, Mo Heart and Pangina Heals are the bottom four queens of the week. Baga Chipz and Blu Hydrangea lip-sync to "Let It Go" by Alexandra Burke. Blu Hydrangea wins the lip-sync and decides to eliminate Pangina Heals from the competition.: Guest Judges: Clara Amfo and Michelle Keegan; Main Challenge: Snatch Game; Runway Theme: Luck Be A Lady; Challenge Winners: Baga Chipz and Blu Hydrangea; Lip-Sync Song: "Let It Go" by Alexandra Burke; Lip-Sync for The World Winner: Blu Hydrangea; Bottom Four: Janey Jacké, Jujubee, Mo Heart and Pangina Heals; Eliminated: Pangina Heals; Farewell Message: "I love you all from the bottom of my ♡ ขอบคุณทุกคนที่รักปันค่ะ" ("I love you all from the bottom of my ♡ thanks everyone for the love for pan")
5	5	"Semifinals"	1 March 2022	0.78
The queens enter the workroom and Baga Chipz reveals she would have sent home Pangina Heals from the competition, had she won the lip-sync. For this week's main challenge, the queens will write, record and perform their own verses to RuPaul's song "London". On the runway, category is Werk of Art. Jujubee and Mo Heart are announced as the Top 2 queens of the week. Baga Chipz, Blu Hydrangea and Janey Jacké are the bottom three queens of the week. Jujubee and Mo Heart lip-sync to "Toy" by Netta. Jujubee wins the lip-sync and decides to eliminate Janey Jacké from the competition.: Guest Judge: Jade Thirlwall; Alternating Judge: Graham Norton; Main Challenge: Write, record and perform their own verses to RuPaul's song "London"; Runway Theme: Werk of Art; Challenge Winners: Jujubee and Mo Heart; Lip-Sync Song: "Toy" by Netta; Lip-Sync for The World Winner: Jujubee; Bottom Three: Baga Chipz, Blu Hydrangea and Janey Jacké; Eliminated: Janey Jacké; Farewell Message: "Life is one big f**king fantasy as long as you believe it! XOXO Janey 💘"
6	6	"Grand Finale"	8 March 2022	0.74
The queens enter the workroom and Mo Heart reveals she would have sent home Janey Jacké from the competition, had she won the lip-sync. The eliminated queens all return to the workroom to discuss everything that went down this season. The queens walk the runway one last time in their Grand Finale Eleganza Extravaganza. RuPaul then announces that the queens will take part in a lip-sync smackdown for the crown. The first lip-sync is between Baga Chipz and Mo Heart. They lip-sync to "Domino" by Jessie J. Mo Heart wins the lip-sync and Baga Chipz is eliminated. The second lip-sync is between Blu Hydrangea and Jujubee. They lip-sync to "The Reflex" by Duran Duran. Blu Hydrangea wins the lip-sync and Jujubee is eliminated. The final lip-sync is between Blu Hydrangea and Mo Heart. They lip-sync to "Supernova" by Kylie Minogue. It is announced that Blu Hydrangea is the winner, leaving Mo Heart as the runner-up.: Alternating Judge: Graham Norton; Runway Theme: Grand Finale Eleganza Extravaganza; Final Four: Baga Chipz, Blu Hydrangea, Jujubee and Mo Heart; Lip-Sync Smackdown #1: Baga Chipz vs. Mo Heart; Lip-Sync Song: "Domino" by Jessie J; Eliminated: Baga Chipz; Lip-Sync Smackdown #2: Blu Hydrangea vs. Jujubee; Lip-Sync Song: "The Reflex" by Duran Duran; Eliminated: Jujubee; Lip-Sync Smackdown #3: Blu Hydrangea vs. Mo Heart; Lip-Sync Song: "Supernova" by Kylie Minogue; Runner-up: Mo Heart; Winner of RuPaul's Drag Race: UK vs. the World Series One: Blu Hydrangea

== Discography ==
List of singles
Title	Series
"West End Wendys: The Rusical"	1
"Living My Life in London" (Cast Version)	1
"Champion (Ru x Blu)" (RuPaul and Blu Hydrangea)	1
