= Jimbo (drag queen) =

Canadian designer and drag performer (born 1982)

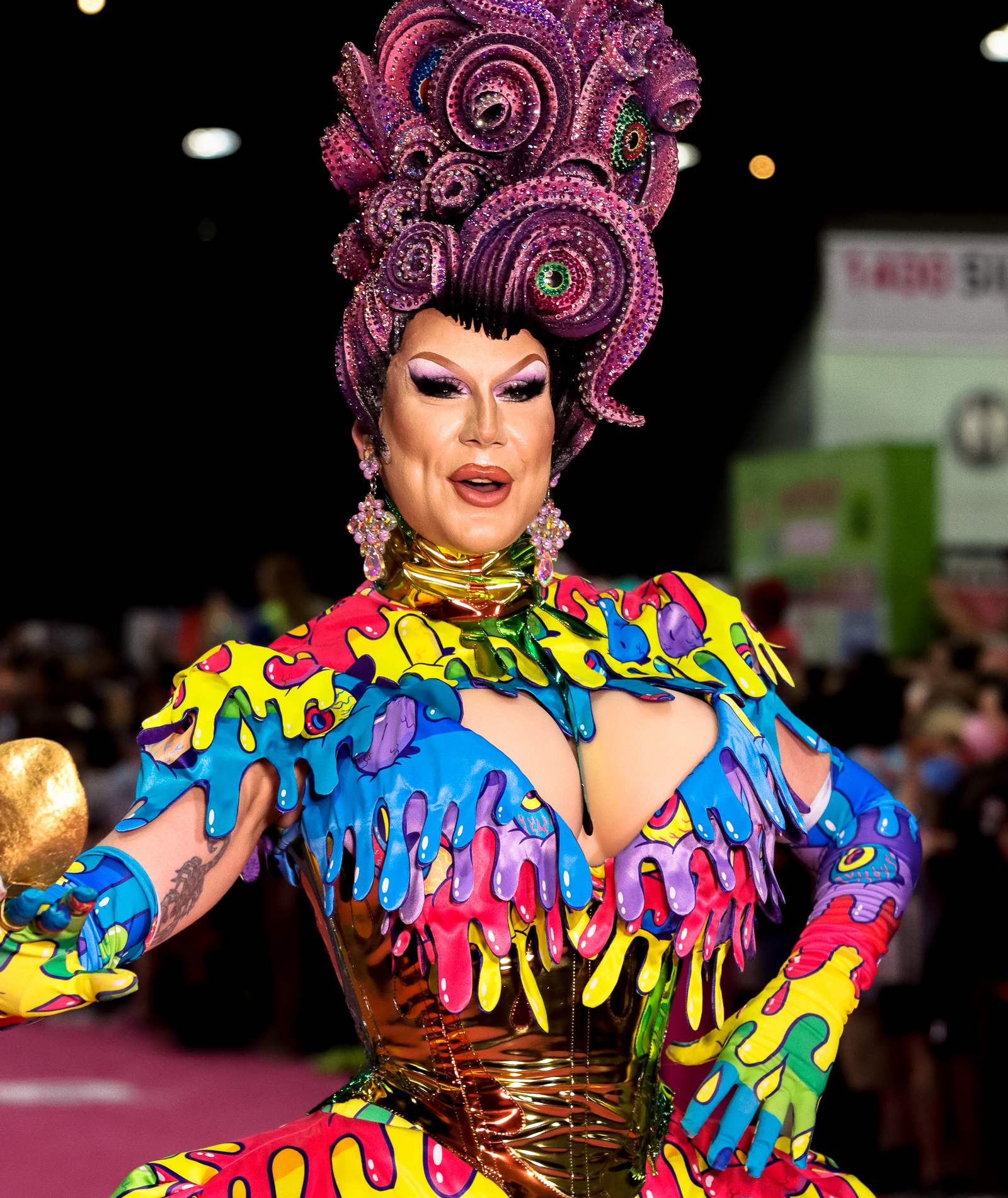
- Jimbo at RuPaul's DragCon LA in 2023
- Born: James Insell; November 10, 1982 (age 43); London, Ontario, Canada
- Other name: Jimbo the Drag Clown
- Education: University of Western Ontario (BS)
- Occupations: Drag queen, designer
- Years active: 2000s–present
- Known for: Canada's Drag Race (season 1); RuPaul's Drag Race: UK vs. the World (series 1); RuPaul's Drag Race All Stars (season 8)
- Website: houseofjimbo.com

James Insell (born November 10, 1982), better known by the stage name Jimbo, is a Canadian designer and drag queen who competed in the first season of Canada's Drag Race (2020), was in the first series of RuPaul's Drag Race: UK vs. the World (2022), and won the eighth season of RuPaul's Drag Race All Stars (2023).

== Early life and education ==
From London, Ontario, Insell, his brother Jeff, as well as sisters Samantha and Jennifer, were born to Mary Insell and James Peter Insell (1947–2018), both boys being interested in creative pursuits from childhood, including early drag play. His father received his PhD in Microbiology and Immunology from the University of Western Ontario in 1983. Respecting his father's wishes that he pursue a career-oriented education, he studied biology at the University of Western Ontario; following graduation, however, he opted not to pursue employment in the field and instead moved to Victoria, British Columbia, where he began working as a costume and production designer. He is married to Brady Taylor.

== Career ==
Insell has worked predominantly in local theatre, including productions of James and the Giant Peach The Rocky Horror Show, and Ride the Cyclone but has also had credits on a number of television films produced by Front Street Pictures for the Hallmark Channel, and on the children's television series Pup Academy. He appeared in the music video for Victoria musician Adrian Chalifour's single "Open Heart". He also appeared as the drag mother to British Columbian rapper bbno$ for the music video for his song "imma".

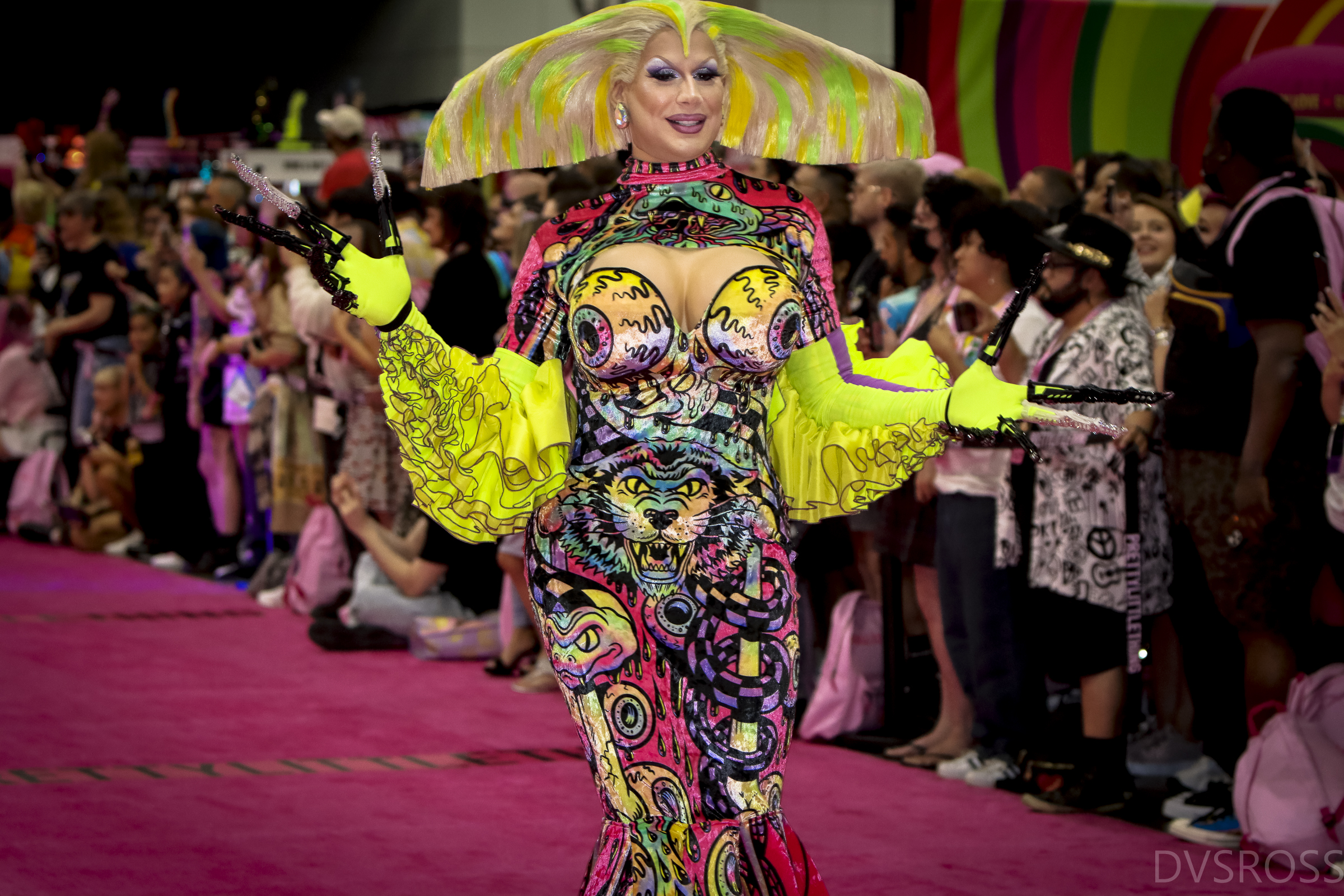
Jimbo at RuPaul's DragCon LA in 2022

He appeared on the first season of Canada's Drag Race in 2020, emerging as a popular fan favourite and winning the key Snatch Game challenge for his performance as Joan Rivers, but was eliminated from the competition in fourth place behind finalists Priyanka, Scarlett BoBo and Rita Baga. For Fierté Montréal's special online edition of its annual Drag Superstars show, which featured all of the Canada's Drag Race queens in prerecorded video performances, Jimbo performed a drag recreation of The Buggles' 1979 hit "Video Killed the Radio Star".

Following Canada's Drag Race he toured the United Kingdom as part of the Klub Kids show with Rock M Sakura and Erika Klash, and was the only queen from the season not to appear at any dates on the Canada's Drag Race Live at the Drive-In tour; however, he did participate alongside Priyanka, Scarlett Bobo and Rita Baga in an online panel discussion as part of the Just for Laughs festival.

During the COVID-19 pandemic in Canada, he also created a line of face masks through his design studio, with every purchase matched by a donation of a free mask to a homeless or low-income person, and launched a Kickstarter campaign to fund the production of House of Jimbo, a comedy and variety series he hopes to launch in the future. Insell has described House of Jimbo as "the framework of a kids show, but really made for adults", comparable to Pee-wee's Playhouse or The Hilarious House of Frightenstein, and the show reached its Kickstarter goal by the end of October 2020. At the same time the Chemainus-based Riot Brewing Company introduced Jimbo, a boysenberry-flavoured craft beer whose profits will go in part to funding House of Jimbo.

In 2021, he made a return appearance in the second season of Canada's Drag Race, appearing in the third episode as the killer in the slasher film-themed acting challenge "Screech". He returned in the third season of Canada's Drag Race in 2022, appearing as a guest judge in the episode "Bitch Stole My Look".

In January 2022, he was announced as one of the nine contestants on the first series of RuPaul's Drag Race: UK vs. the World. After winning the first two episodes of the season, Jimbo landed in the bottom in the third episode and was eliminated by Pangina Heals, after Pangina Heals won a lipsync against Dutch contestant Janey Jacké to "We Like to Party! (The Vengabus)" by Vengaboys. Jimbo's early elimination was dubbed one of the most "controversial" in the history of the franchise.

Jimbo returned to the Drag Race franchise to compete on the eighth season of RuPaul's Drag Race All Stars (2023). After winning a record-tying 4 challenges over the course of the season, Jimbo was crowned the winner of the season and earned a cash prize of $200,000 plus $20,000 for the 4 challenges he won, totalling $220,000. After the airing of the season, Jimbo was announced to host her own WOW Presents Plus series, It's my Special Show!, which premiered on August 7, 2023. In November 2023, Jimbo signed with talent agencies WME and Producer Entertainment Group.

In February 2024 Jimbo competed on Family Feud Canada, with a team consisting of his siblings Jeff and Rebecca, and Jimbo's and Jeff's husbands.

At the 2025 Just for Laughs festival, Jimbo and his Canada's Drag Race castmate Lemon taped a roast battle for the fifth season of Roast Battle Canada.

In February 2026, Jimbo was announced as a main judge on Canada's Drag Race All Stars alongside Brooke Lynn Hytes and Priyanka. This makes this panel the first all-drag queen judging panel in Drag Race history.

== Filmography ==
=== Television ===
Year	Title	Role	Notes
2020	Canada's Drag Race (season 1)	Herself	Contestant (4th place)
2021	Canada's Drag Race (season 2)	Herself	Guest; Episode 3
2022	RuPaul's Drag Race: UK vs. the World (series 1)	Herself	Contestant (7th place)
2022	Canada's Drag Race (season 3)	Herself	Guest judge
2023	RuPaul's Drag Race All Stars (season 8)	Herself	Contestant (Winner)
2023	RuPaul's Drag Race All Stars: Untucked	Herself	Contestant (Winner)
2023	GMA3: What You Need to Know	Herself	Guest
2023	Watch What Happens Live with Andy Cohen	Herself	Guest
2023	Good Morning America	Herself	Guest
2023	RuPaul's Drag Race UK (series 5)	Herself	Special guest
2024	Drag Race Belgium (season 2)	Herself	Guest
2024	RuPaul's Drag Race All Stars (season 9)	Herself	Guest
2025	Drag Race Philippines: Slaysian Royale	Herself	Guest judge; 2 episodes
2026	Roast Battle Canada	Herself	Roast battle vs Lemon
2026	Canada's Drag Race All Stars	Herself	Main judge

=== Film ===
Year	Title	Role	Notes
2026	The Snake	Bon Bon Scott	

=== Music videos ===
Year	Title	Artist	Ref.
2019	"Open Heart"	Adrian Chalifour	
2020	"imma"	bbno$	
2021	"Bitch I'm Busy"	Priyanka	
2022	"Don't Call Me"	Joseph Shepherd	
2023	"True Colors"	Kylie Sonique Love	
2025	"Big Top"	Self	
2025	"NSFW"	bbno$	

=== Internet series ===
Year	Title	Role	Ref.
2021	Jimbo vs. Peas	Herself	
2022	Bring Back My Girls	Herself / Guest	
2023	Meet the Queens	Herself / Stand-alone special	
2023	EW News Flash	Herself / Guest	
2023	BuzzFeed Celeb	Herself / Guest	
2023	React to TikTok Trends by Allure	Herself / Guest	
2023	It's My Special Show!	Herself / Host	
2023	The Awardist	Herself / Guest	
2024	Drag Me to The Movies	Various	

== Discography ==
All credits adapted from Spotify and Apple Music.

=== Singles ===
==== As lead artist ====
Year	Title	Album	Writer(s)	Producer(s)
2022	"Free & Horny"	Non-album singles	Andrew Taylor, Jimbo Insell	Andrew Taylor
2022	"Angel"	Non-album singles	Andrew Taylor, Jimbo Insell	Andrew Taylor
2022	"Pumpkin Tits"	Non-album singles	Andrew Taylor, Jimbo Insell	Andrew Taylor
2023	"Stitch"	Non-album singles	Andrew Taylor, Jimbo Insell	Andrew Taylor
2025	"Big Top"	Non-album singles	James Insell, Drew Louis, Jayelle, Coen Hutton	Drew Louis

==== As featured artist ====
Year	Title	Album
2020	"Not Sorry Aboot It" (with the cast of Canada's Drag Race, season 1)	Non-album singles
2023	"Money, Success, Fame, Glamour" (Disco version) (with the cast of RuPaul's Drag Race All Stars, season 8)	Non-album singles
2023	"Joan! The Unauthorized Rusical" (with the cast of RuPaul's Drag Race All Stars, season 8)	Joan! The Unauthorized Rusical Album
2023	"Trinity Ruins Christmas" (Trinity the Tuck featuring Jimbo)	Trinity Ruins Christmas: The Musical
2023	"Good Enough" (Trinity the Tuck featuring Jimbo)	Trinity Ruins Christmas: The Musical

Preceded by Jinkx Monsoon	Winner of RuPaul's Drag Race All Stars; US All Stars 8	Succeeded by Angeria Paris VanMicheals
