= Lemon (drag queen) =

Canadian drag performer (born 1995)

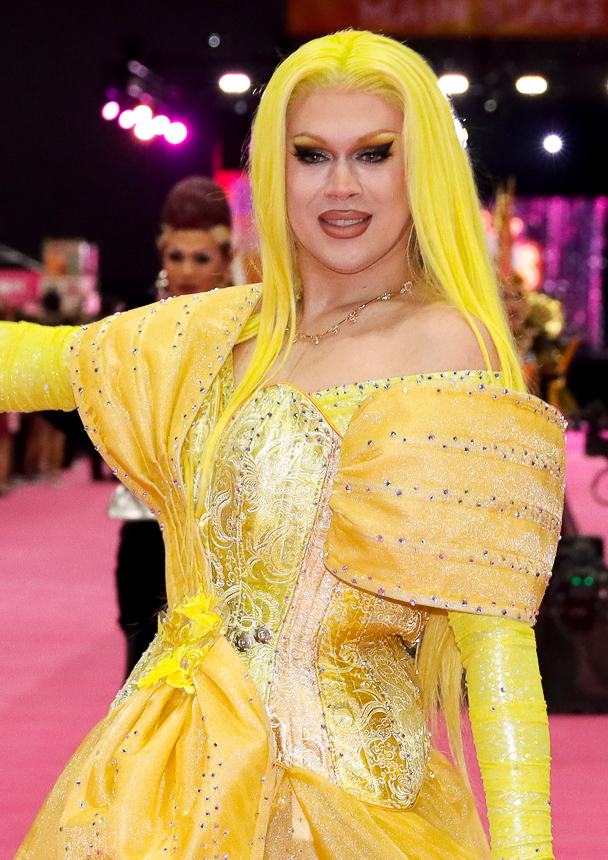
- Lemon at RuPaul's DragCon LA, 2024
- Born: Christopher Elliott Baptista; September 1, 1995 (age 31); Toronto, Ontario, Canada
- Education: Ailey School (GrDip)
- Occupation: Drag queen
- Television: Canada's Drag Race (season 1); RuPaul's Drag Race: UK vs. the World (series 1); Canada's Drag Race: Canada vs. the World (season 2)

Lemon is the stage name of Christopher Elliott Baptista (born September 1, 1995), a Canadian drag performer, best known for competing on the first season of Canada's Drag Race (2020) and the first series of RuPaul's Drag Race: UK vs. the World (2022). Lemon later went on to win the second season of Canada's Drag Race: Canada vs. the World (2024).

== Education ==
Lemon relocated from Toronto to New York City at the age of 19 to study dance at the Ailey School.

== Career ==
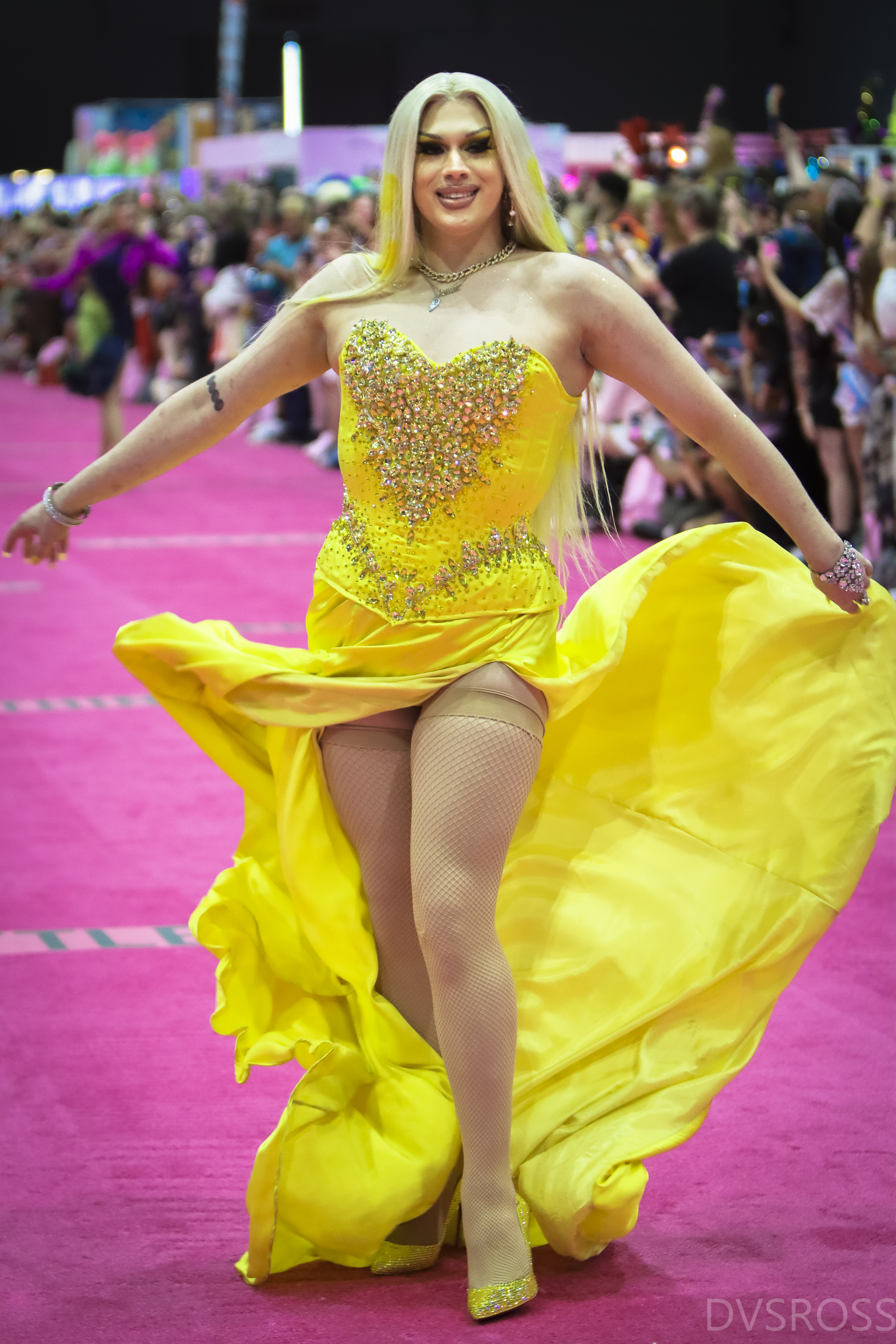
Lemon at RuPaul's DragCon LA, 2022

Lemon started doing drag in New York City. Sasha Velour invited Lemon to model in her New York Fashion Week collaboration with Opening Ceremony.

She competed as the only U.S.-based contestant on the first season of Canada's Drag Race. In the first episode of the season, she placed in the bottom two, but was saved from elimination after winning a lip sync battle against Juice Boxx to Carly Rae Jepsen's "I Really Like You". Lemon subsequently won the main challenges in episode 2 and episode 7, before being eliminated from the competition in episode 8 following a lip sync against Rita Baga to Alanis Morissette's "You Oughta Know", ultimately placing fifth overall. Lemon portrayed JoJo Siwa during the Snatch Game episode.

In 2021, Lemon was a featured performer in "Come Through", a single by her Canada's Drag Race castmate Priyanka.

In January 2022, she was announced as one of the nine contestants on the first series of RuPaul's Drag Race: UK vs. the World. In the premiere episode, she landed in the bottom alongside Janey Jacké from the first season of the Dutch franchise, and was sent home by Pangina Heals who hosted Drag Race Thailand, finishing the competition in ninth place.

Also in 2022, Lemon began releasing a series of singles, including "Sweet and Sour" and "5 6 7 Ate", leading up to the release of her debut EP Citrussy in 2023. In 2023, Lemon also appeared on a remix of Rêve's single "Tongue".

In June 2024, Lemon was announced as one of the queens competing on the second season of Canada's Drag Race: Canada vs. the World. She subsequently ended up winning the season, taking home the grand prize of $100,000 and the title of "Queen of the Motherpucking World". In July, Lemon was featured on Priyanka's single "Gucciyanka".

At the 2025 Just for Laughs festival, Lemon and her Canada's Drag Race castmate Jimbo taped a roast battle for the fifth season of Roast Battle Canada.

In November 2025, she appeared as a guest in the season 6 premiere of Canada's Drag Race, and debuted as host of the new CDR aftershow, The Last Squeeze.

== Personal life ==
Originally from Toronto, Lemon has lived in New York City for several years.

== Discography ==
=== Albums ===
- CITRUSSY (2023)

=== Extended plays ===
- ZESTINY (vol. 1) (2024)

=== Singles ===
==== As main artist ====
- Sweet and Sour (2022)
- Sticky Sweet (with Lagoona Bloo) (2022)
- Tongue (12" Mix) (with Rêve) (2022)
- Big Bank (2023)
- Let Loose (Andrew's Angels Edition) (with Loosey LaDuca & Jan) (2023)
- 567 Ate (2023)
- IT'S NOT THAT DEEP (2024)
- POOL PARTY (feat. Marina Summers) (2024)

==== As featured artist ====
- Come Through (Priyanka feat. Lemon) (2021)
- Sleigh My Name (Remix) (Priyanka, Alaska Thunderfuck & Shea Couleé feat. Lemon) (2022)
- Tongue (Remix) (Rêve feat. Lemon) (2022)
- HOURGLASS (Slim Z feat. Lemon) (2023)
- Citrus 2.0 (Jake Jonez feat. Lemon) (2024)
- GUCCIYANKA (Priyanka feat. Lemon) (2024)

== Filmography ==
=== Television ===
Year	Title	Role	Notes
2020	Canada's Drag Race (season 1)	Herself	Contestant (5th Place)
2022	RuPaul's Drag Race: UK vs. the World (series 1)	Herself	Contestant (9th Place)
2024	Canada's Drag Race: Canada vs. the World (season 2)	Herself	Contestant (Winner)
2026	Roast Battle Canada	Herself	Roast battle vs Jimbo

=== Web series ===
Year	Title	Role	Notes
2022	Bring Back My Girls	Herself	
