= Canada's Drag Race: Canada vs. the World =

Canadian reality competition television series (since 2022)

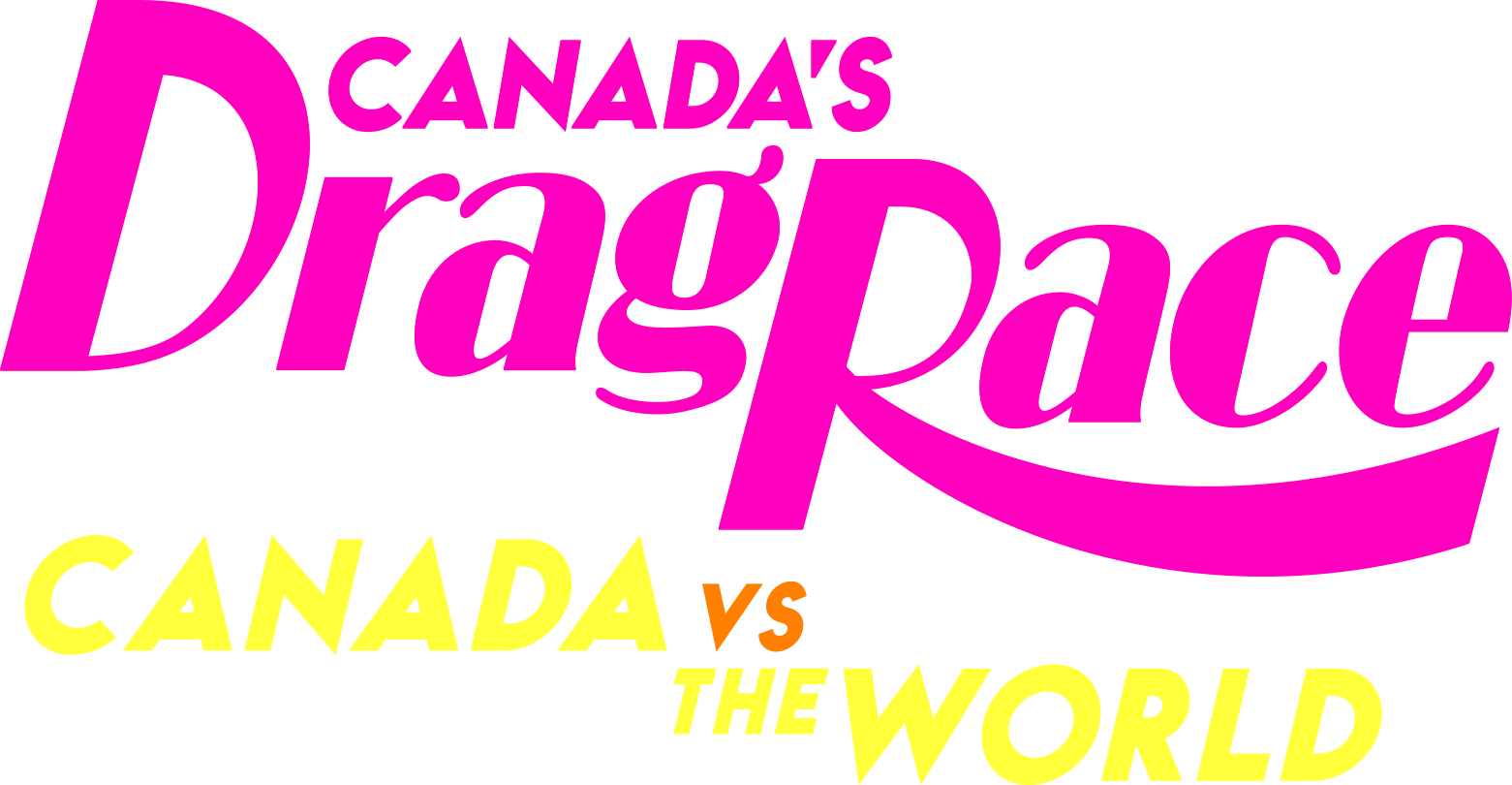
- Genre: Reality competition
- Created by: RuPaul
- Based on: RuPaul's Drag Race
- Presented by: Brooke Lynn Hytes
- Judges: Brooke Lynn Hytes; Brad Goreski; Traci Melchor
- Ending theme: "U Wear It Well"
- Country of origin: Canada
- Original language: English
- No. of seasons: 2
- No. of episodes: 12

Production
- Production companies: Blue Ant Studios; Bell Media; World of Wonder

Original release
- Network: Crave; WOW Presents Plus (International)
- Release: November 18, 2022 – present

Related
- RuPaul's Drag Race: UK vs. the World; Canada's Drag Race; Drag Race Philippines: Slaysian Royale; Drag Race Down Under vs. the World; Drag Race México: Latina Royale

Canada's Drag Race: Canada vs. the World is an international all-stars series of Drag Race that premiered via Crave and WOW Presents Plus on November 18, 2022. The series, a spinoff of Canada's Drag Race, follows RuPaul's Drag Race: UK vs. the World, which brought together past competitors from the Drag Race franchise.

Similar to the preceding iteration, Brooke Lynn Hytes assumes the dual responsibilities of hosting and serving as the head judge in Canada's Drag Race: Canada vs. the World. The show enlists a panel of supporting judges, including Brad Goreski and Traci Melchor.

The contestants compete for a prize package consisting of $100,000 and the esteemed title, "Queen of the Motherpucking World". In June 2023, the show was renewed for a second season.

== Format ==
=== Season 1 ===
In the first season, the format is similar to seasons 2 to 4 of RuPaul's Drag Race All Stars. The top two queens of the maxi challenge will participate in a Lip Sync For The World. The winner of the lip sync received either a luxury vacation or $10,000, alongside the power to eliminate one of the bottom queens from the competition. In the finale, the top 4 will participate in a Lip Sync For The Crown tournament to determine the winner.

=== Season 2 ===
The second season saw a change to the format, with the format now similar to the fourth and fifth season of Canada's Drag Race. Each week, there are 1 maxi challenge winner and 3 bottom queens. The winner of the maxi challenge will win the Golden Beaver, with the power to save one of the bottom 3 queens from participating in a lip sync. The other 2 queens who are not saved by the Golden Beaver will have to Lip Sync For Their Lives, to determine which queen will be eliminated. In the finale, the top 4 will participate in a Lip Sync For The Crown tournament to determine the winner.

== Judges ==
The competition is hosted and judged primarily by Brooke Lynn Hytes, with Brad Goreski and Traci Melchor returning as regular judges, and Sarain Fox appearing as a guest judge on both seasons.

Judges on Canada's Drag Race: Canada vs. the World
Judge	Season	
Judge	1	2
Brooke Lynn Hytes	Main	Main
Brad Goreski	Main	Main
Traci Melchor	Main	Main
Sarain Fox	Guest	Recurring

== Series overview ==
Season	Contestants	Episodes	Originally released		Winner	Runner(s)-up	Miss Congeniality
Season	Contestants	Episodes	First released	Last released	Winner	Runner(s)-up	Miss Congeniality
1	9	6	November 18, 2022	December 23, 2022	Ra'Jah O'Hara	Silky Nutmeg Ganache	Anita Wigl'it
2	9	6	July 19, 2024	August 23, 2024	Lemon	Alexis Mateo	Eureka!

=== Season 1 ===
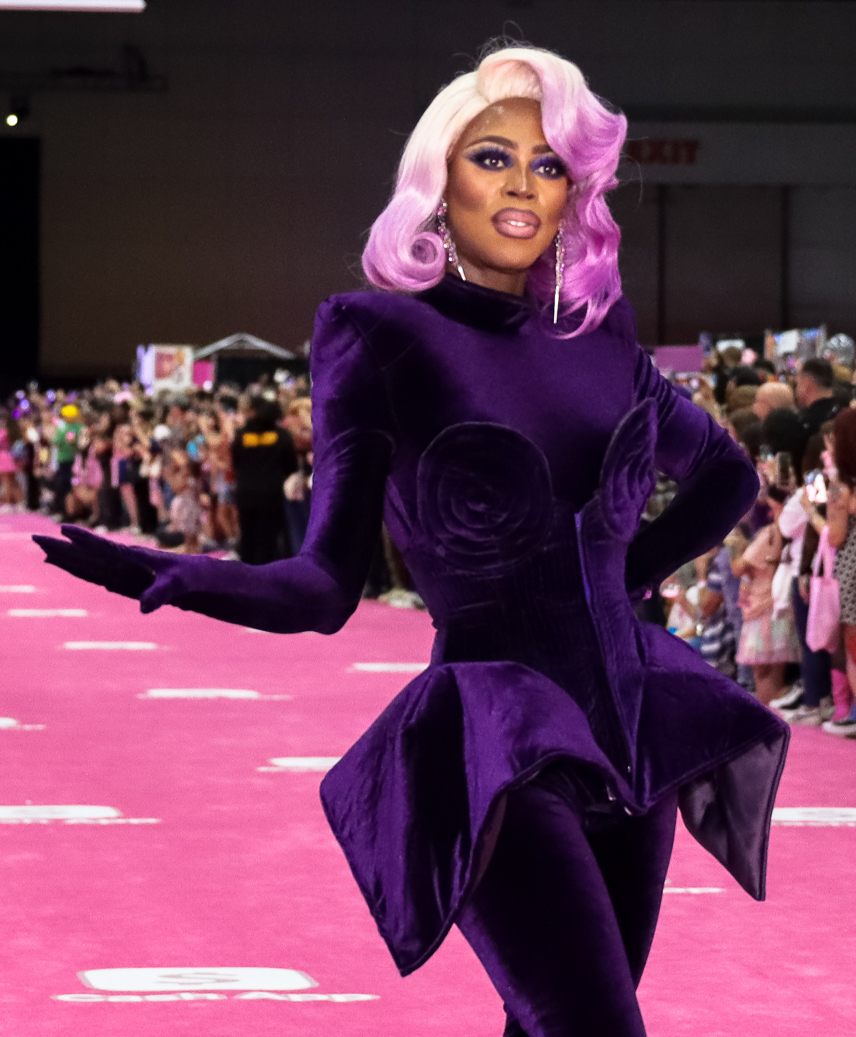
Season 1 winner, Ra'Jah O'Hara

The premiere season featured contestants competing from the United Kingdom, Canada, New Zealand, and the United States. The season was ultimately won by Ra'Jah O'Hara, who previously competed on season 11 of RuPaul's Drag Race as well as season 6 of RuPaul's Drag Race All Stars

=== Season 2 ===
The second season featured contestants competing from the United States, France, Canada, and the United Kingdom. The season was ultimately won by Lemon, who previously competed on season 1 of Canada's Drag Race, and series 1 of RuPaul's Drag Race: UK. vs the World.

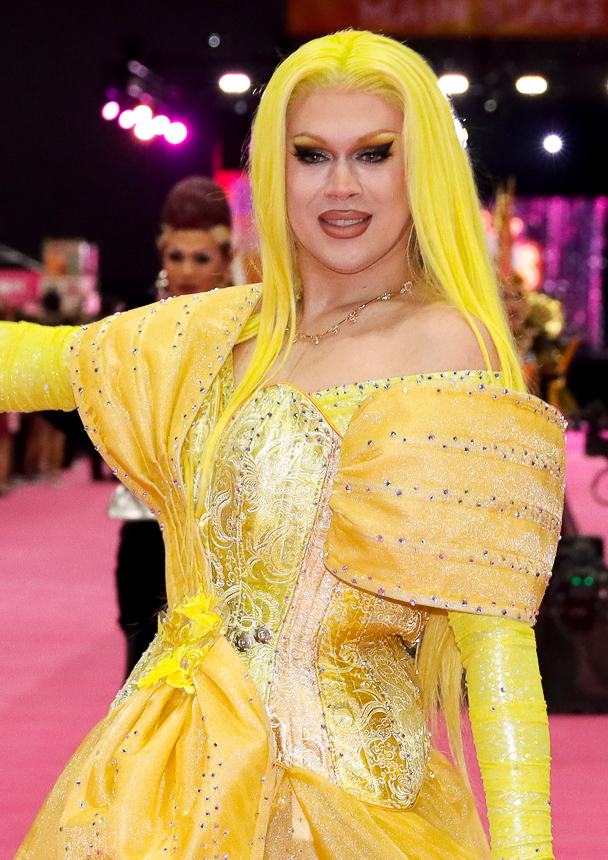
Season 2 winner, Lemon
