= Deja Vu (Coterie song) =

2022 single by Coterie

Single by Coterie

from the album Coterie
- Released: 18 November 2022
- Genre: pop; reggae; dub
- Length: 3:07
- Label: Massive Records
- Songwriter(s): Antoni Fisher; Brandford Fisher; Conrad Fisher; Joshua Fisher; Tyler Fisher
- Producer(s): Coterie; Robby De Sá

Coterie singles chronology
"West Coast Drive" (2022)	"Deja Vu" (2022)	"Shame" (2022)

Music video
- "Deja Vu" on YouTube

"Deja Vu" is a song by Australian-New Zealand band Coterie, released as a single in November 2022 on the same day as their song "Shame".

== Background and composition ==
The band wrote the song to have a "subtle feel-good charm".

== Release ==
The song was first announced by the band on TikTok on 14 November 2022. "Deja Vu" and their song "Shame" were both released as singles on 18 November, paired with the announcement of the album. The streaming version of the single was a five-track extended play, featuring both "Deja Vu", "Shame", and the band's three previously released singles. A music video for "Deja Vu" was released later in the same month.

== Critical reception ==
Dave Ruby Howe of Triple J Unearthed gave the song a four and a half-star review, calling the song "seriously intoxicating".

== Track listing ==
Deja Vu EP

1. "Deja Vu" – 3:07
2. "Shame" – 3:57
3. "West Coast Drive" – 3:46
4. "Killing It Off" – 2:50
5. "Cool It Down" – 4:29

== Credits and personnel ==
- Coterie – performer, producer
- Robby De Sá – producer
- Antoni Fisher – songwriter, engineer
- Brandford Fisher – songwriter
- Conrad Fisher – songwriter
- Joshua Fisher – songwriter
- Tyler Fisher – songwriter
- Raúl López – mixing engineer
- Greg Stace – engineer
- Hector Vega – mastering engineer

== Charts ==
Chart (2022)	Peak position
New Zealand Hot Singles (Recorded Music NZ)	5
New Zealand Artist Singles (Recorded Music NZ)	17

== Certifications ==
Certifications for "Deja Vu"
Region	Certification	Certified units/sales
New Zealand (RMNZ)	Gold	15,000^{‡}
^{‡} Sales+streaming figures based on certification alone.
