= Kookies N Kream =

- Origin: Sydney, New South Wales, Australia
- Genres: Hip hop
- Years active: 2009–present
- Website: http://www.kookiesnkream.com.au

Kookies N Kream is an Australian hip-hop dance crew best known for placing sixth in Season 6 of Australia's Got Talent in 2012. They were initially formed by Jet Valencia in 2009 who recruited Glen Gaspi, Natasha Pinto, Kimberly Grana, Dylan Elul, Gabriel Mendoza, Christopher Patacsil, and Mei Lin. After their first performance at a family Christmas party, Isabel Martinez, Gerina Perez, Patrick Maglaque, Emilynn Villianueva, Emily Lee, Bridgette Badger and Nicholas Giddings joined in 2010. By 2011, four more members had been recruited: Harry Harrop, Robert Mejica, Geraldina Hintko and Charmaine Bohol. Jet Valencia is the crew's dance teacher and director, currently managing the current Kookies N Kream generation with his wife Miriam Yousif.

== History ==
=== Early career ===
Jet Valencia began dancing and performing at age 18 in Sydney, Australia. The self-taught dancer was inspired by watching videos of other dancers online. He auditioned for season 2 of So You Think You Can Dance Australia and qualified as one of the Top 100 finalists. Valencia's dance style included popping, locking, krumping, and urban street dance. In Sydney, he formed his own dance group consisting of members Glen Gaspi, Natasha Pinto, Kimberly Grana, Dylan Elul, Gabriel Mendoza, Christopher Patacsil, and Mei Lin. The group performed their first dance routine at a family Christmas party in 2009. After their first performance, Valencia had ambitions to take the group to compete at a national level. Through social and family connections of the original eight members, Isabel Martinez, Gerina Perez, Patrick Maglaque, Emilynn Villianueva, Emily Lee, Bridgette Badger and Nicholas Giddings joined in 2010, eventfully forming the group named Kookies N Kream.

Established in 2010 as Kookies N Kream Dance Crew, they began as a weekend dance class amongst friends in Glen Gaspi's living room. The group's name was inspired by the rugged street dance style of the males, co-existing with the smooth grooves from the females in the crew. The dance crew decided as a whole that they would train to compete in Sydney's dance crew competition, Looze Control on 28 August; they were awarded Champions of the Freshman Division. After placing first in their division, Kookies N Kream crew were chosen by Nojon Entertainment to be a supporting act for Poreotics Tic Tic Tour at the Sydney City Recital Hall, on 4 October 2010.

Kookies N Kream expanded in 2011, bringing the total members to nineteen. Harry Harrop, Glen Gaspi's cousin, was recruited, along with Robert Mejica, Geraldina Hintko and Charmaine Bohol, all of whom are high school friends of the original members.

=== Australia's Got Talent ===
In 2012, Kookies N Kream auditioned as a nineteen-member group for the sixth season of Australia's Got Talent. The group was eliminated at sixth place in the Grand Finals Episode on 25 July.

==== Semi-final ====
The "Order" columns lists the order of appearance each act made for every episode.

Order	Contestant	Act	Finished
1	Black Diamonds Drilldance Team	Dance Team	Lost Public Vote
2	Andy Holm	Performer	Lost Public Vote
3	Monique Le Bas	Opera Singer	Lost Public Vote
4	Ten Days After Christmas	Singer Songwriters	Lost Public Vote
5	The Nelson Twins	Comedians	Won Judges Vote
6	Anthony Laye	Mind Reader	Lost Judges Vote
7	Kookies N Kream	Dance Crew	Won Public Vote

==== Final showdown 2 ====
Order	Contestant	Act	Finished
1	Flowers For Midnight	Pop Band	Lost Public Vote
2	George & Noriko	Blues fusion musicians	Top 5 - Eliminated
3	The Nelson Twins	Comedians	Lost Public Vote
4	The Wolfe Brothers	Country Rock Band	Won public vote
5	Soul Mystique	Quick Change Illusionists	Won Judges Vote
6	Rhys Tohlhurst	Big Band Singer	Lost Public Vote
7	Kookies N Kream	Dance Crew	Won Judges Vote
8	Andrew De Silva	Singer	Won public vote

==== Grand Final ====
Order	Contestant	Act	Finished
1	Genesis	Beatboxer	8th Place
2	The Wolfe Brothers	Country Rock Band	Runner Up
3	Dylan Yeandle	Comedic Stripper	7th Place
4	Joe Moore	Singer	4th Place
5	Soul Mystique	Quick Change Act	3rd Place
6	Kookies N Kream	Dance Crew	6th Place
7	Andrew De Silva	Singer	Winner
8	Odyssey	Gymnastics Troupe	5th Place

== Awards ==
- 1st Place Looze Control 2010
- 1st Place Looze Control 2011
- Australias Got Talent Semi Finals 2012
- Australias Got Talent Finals 2012
- 6th place Australias Got Talent Grand finalists 2012
- 1st Place World Supremacy Battlegrounds Nationals 2016
- 1st Place World Supremacy Battlegrounds Nationals 2018
- 1st Place World Supremacy Battlegrounds Nationals 2021
- 1st Australian Hip Hop Championships 2022
- 9th Place World Hip Hop Championships 2022

== Members ==
Generation	Members
1 (2010)	Jet Valencia
1 (2010)	Glen Gaspi
1 (2010)	Natasha Pinto
1 (2010)	Kimberly Grana
1 (2010)	Isabel Martinez
1 (2010)	Gerina Perez
1 (2010)	Patcrick Maglaque
1 (2010)	Dylan Elul
1 (2010)	Gabriel Mendoza
1 (2010)	Emily Lee
1 (2010)	Christopher Patacsil
1 (2010)	Bridgette Badger
1 (2010)	Nicholas Giddings
2 2011–2012	Jet Valencia
2 2011–2012	Jasmine Gaspi (Manager)
2 2011–2012	Glen Gaspi
2 2011–2012	Natasha Pinto
2 2011–2012	Kimberly Grana
2 2011–2012	Isabel Martinez
2 2011–2012	Gerina Perez
2 2011–2012	Patrick Maglaque
2 2011–2012	Dylan Elul
2 2011–2012	Gabriel Mendoza
2 2011–2012	Emily Lee
2 2011–2012	Bridgette Badger
2 2011–2012	Harry Harrop
2 2011–2012	Geraldina Hintko
2 2011–2012	Charmaine Bohol
2 2011–2012	Robert Mejica
2 2011–2012	Emilynn Villianueva
3 2012–2013 KNK HHI ADULTS DIV	Jet Valencia
3 2012–2013 KNK HHI ADULTS DIV	Harry Harrop
3 2012–2013 KNK HHI ADULTS DIV	Patrick Maglaque
3 2012–2013 KNK HHI ADULTS DIV	Emilynn Villianueva
4 2013–2014	Jet Valencia
4 2013–2014	Patrick Maglaque
4 2013–2014	Emilynn Villianueva
4 2013–2014	Harry Harrop
4 2013–2014	Adam Yigiter
4 2013–2014	Rennard Velasco
4 2013–2014	Honey
4 2013–2014	Elizabeth Golikova
4 2013–2014	Ivy Moon
4 2013–2014	Kayla Clarke
5	Jet Valencia
5	Miriam Yousif
5	Adam Yigiter
5	Rennard Velasco
5	Honey
5	Elizabeth Golikova
5	Ivy Moon
5	Brenton Rakebrandt
5	Tori Stephanie
5	Sunhyee Lee
5	Jessica Nakhoul
