= A Thousand Lifetimes =

Studio album by Joe Moore
- Released: 6 November 2015
- Recorded: Studios 301; September–October 2015
- Genres: R&B, pop
- Length: 36:39
- Labels: Decca Records, Universal Music Australia
- Producer: Andy Mak

Joe Moore chronology
Symphony (2013)	A Thousand Lifetimes (2015)

Singles from A Thousand Lifetimes
- 1. "Symphony" Released: 13 August 2013; 2. "Invincible" Released: 2 October 2015

A Thousand Lifetimes is the debut studio album by Australian singer-songwriter, Joe Moore. It was released by Universal Music Australia on 6 November 2015 and debuted at number 5 on the ARIA chart. Andy Mak (who has previously worked with Tina Arena, Boy & Bear and Bertie Blackman) produced the album.

== Background and recording ==
In 2012, Moore auditioned for series six of Australia's Got Talent and came fourth. After Australia's Got Talent, Moore continued busking in Sydney's Pitt Street Mall, which he had begun doing in 2008 and writing his own material.

He recorded and independently released his debut extended play ‘‘Symphony’’ in August 2013, which peaked at number 18 on the indie chart.

In 2015, Moore auditioned for the fourth series of The Voice Australia with a cover of "I See Fire". He was announced runner-up in the finale on 30 August. The following week, his single "Symphony" made its ARIA Charts debut at number 52.

On 10 September 2015, Moore announced he had signed with Universal Music Australia and spent two weeks working on an album of covers until the label changed their mind and asked for an album of originals. "That's the beauty of coming second," Moore says. "You have time to sit back and say 'Maybe we don't have to do a 'journey' (covers) album'. If you win there's a huge rush. Winning is beneficial, obviously, but for me I got to do my original album so I'm very happy."

The album was announced on 26 October. Four tracks on the album are also on his EP ‘‘Symphony’’, of which he re-recorded, including the single “Symphony”. The album came with a bonus 3-track pre-order ‘acoustic session’ EP if ordered via iTunes or physically via Sanity. These three tracks are re-recorded and re-mastered songs Moore performed on ‘’The Voice’’.

Joe performed songs from the album in Pitt Street Mall, Sydney on 7 November. and "Invincible" on Today on 9 November

== Singles ==
- “Symphony” was released on 13 August 2013. A music video was released on 3 September 2015. It peaked at number 52 in September 2015.
- “Invincible” was released on 2 October 2015. A music video was released on 15 October. It peaked at number 68 in October 2015.

== Track listing ==
Disc one
No.	Title	Writer(s)	Length
1.	"Home"	Thom Macken / Joe Moore / Hayley Warner	3:56
2.	"Invincible"	Michael Fatkin / Ben Hastings / Joe Moore	3:20
3.	"Lucky Ones"	Michael Fatkin / Dean Lewis / Marty Sampson	3:26
4.	"Symphony"	Andrew Macken / Thom Macken / Joe Moore / Hayley Warner	3:07
5.	"A Thousand Lifetimes"	Eric McCarthy / Martin Michael Mullally / Roberto De Sa	3:58
6.	"Back to My Heart"	Joe Moore / Lindsay Rimes / Hayley Warner	3:26
7.	"Miss You"	Joe Moore / Roberto De Sa	3:20
8.	"Listen to Me"	Rodney Alejandro / Joe Moore	3:45
9.	"Without You"	Tom Diesel / Ronald Haryanto / Joe Moore / Roberto De Sa	3:57
10.	"Love of My Life"	Tom Diesel / Joe Moore	4:23

Disc two (bonus pre-order Sanity tracks)
No.	Title	Writer(s)	Length
1.	"I See Fire"	Ed Sheeran
2.	"The Blower's Daughter"	Damien Rice
3.	"Everybody Hurts"	Bill Berry / Peter Buck / Mike Mills / Michael Stipe

== Chart positions ==
=== Weekly charts ===
Chart (2015)	Peak position
Australian Albums (ARIA)	5

== Release history ==
Region	Date	Format(s)	Label	Catalog	Ref.
Australia	6 November 2015	CD; digital download	Decca Records, Universal Music Australia	4764017	
