= West Coast Drive (song) =

2022 single by Coterie

Single by Coterie

from the album Coterie
- Released: 9 September 2022
- Genre: pop; reggae; dub
- Length: 3:46
- Label: Massive Records
- Songwriter(s): Brandford Fisher; Conrad Fisher; Daniel Skeed; Joshua Fisher; Tyler Fisher
- Producer(s): Coterie; Robby De Sá; Marlon Gerbes

Coterie singles chronology
"Killing It Off" (2022)	"West Coast Drive" (2022)	"Deja Vu" (2022)

Music video
- "West Coast Drive" on YouTube

"West Coast Drive" is a song by Australian-New Zealand band Coterie, released as a single in September 2022. The song references West Coast Drive in Perth.

== Background and composition ==
The song references the band's home in Perth, along West Coast Drive. The song took inspiration from the surf and art culture of Perth, and was written as a "good vibes anthem" with a "summer house party" sound.

== Release ==
"West Coast Drive" was released as a single on 9 September 2022, a week after the Māori language version of "Cool It Down" was released for Te Wiki o te Reo Māori. A music video was shot for the song, and was filmed on West Coast Drive in Perth.

== Critical reception ==
Australian drummer and music reviewer Vince Leigh called the song a "soulful pop hybrid", praising the track as "slick and sophisticated, littered with bite-sized hooks and some decent heft in the drum department, and all augmented by a thoughtful, inventive approach". Dave Ruby Howe of Triple J Unearthed gave the song a five-star review, calling the song a "summer anthem" with "vibes from tip to toe", and Claire Mooney (also of Triple J) gave the song four and a half stars; calling it a "blissed out specialty".

== Credits and personnel ==
- Coterie – performer, producer
- Robby De Sá – producer
- Marlon Gerbes – producer
- Antoni Fisher – engineer
- Brandford Fisher – songwriter
- Conrad Fisher – songwriter
- Joshua Fisher – songwriter
- Tyler Fisher – songwriter
- Raúl López – mixing engineer
- Daniel Skeed – songwriting
- Brody Simpson – engineer
- Hector Vega – mastering engineer

== Charts ==
Chart (2022)	Peak position
New Zealand Hot Singles (Recorded Music NZ)	16
New Zealand Artist Hot Singles (Recorded Music NZ)	1
