= Bring Me Love =

Bring Me Love may refer to:

- "Bring Me Love", a 1955 song by Brook Benton
- "Bring Me Love", a 1956 song by The Clovers
- "Bring Me Love", a 2006 song by Copyright featuring Imaani
- "Bring Me Love", a 2007 song by Marié Digby
- "Bring Me Love", a 2014 song by Tina Arena from her Reset album
- "Bring Me Love", a 2018 song by John Legend from his A Legendary Christmas album
- "Bring Me Love", a remix by Frankie Knuckles of the Andrea Mendez song
