= The Pilgrim (Owen Campbell album) =

Studio album by Owen Campbell
- Released: 7 June 2013
- Studios: 30 Mill Studios, Brunswick
- Genre: Blues
- Length: 40:18
- Labels: MGM; Reckless Grace
- Producer: Mark Opitz

Owen Campbell chronology
Sunshine Road (2011)	The Pilgrim (2013)	Breathing Blues (2016)

The Pilgrim is the second studio album by Australian blues singer-guitarist, Owen Campbell. It was released locally on 7 June 2013 via MGM Distribution and in the United States on Reckless Grace Music on 18 June 2013. It peaked at No. 5 on the ARIA Hitseekers Albums chart.

== Background ==
Owen Campbell was a finalist in the sixth season of the reality TV quest, Australia's Got Talent, broadcast from April to July 2012. He followed with his second studio album, The Pilgrim (7 June 2013), which was recorded in Brunswick with Mark Opitz producing. Campbell, on electric, slide and acoustic guitars, banjo and lead vocals, was joined in the studio by Jeff Lang on guitar and mandolin, and the Wolfgramm Sisters on vocals. The Pilgrim peaked at No. 5 on the ARIA Hitseekers Albums chart.

== Reception ==
Richard MacDougall of Blues Rock Review rated it at seven-out-of-ten and explained, "If you're familiar with Campbell's brand of folk-infused blues played with a shot-glass slide on an old acoustic guitar, don't attach yourself too much to the image – on Sunshine Road's follow-up and Campbell's stateside debut [album], things are a little bit grittier, dirtier, and less acoustic." Workin' Man's Blues' Ross Carlson felt, "[its] downright nasty electric tones that sound like a sputtering dimed out 50's fender combo. Sure it's a little muddy, but after all this is the blues, and it fits the genera well. While the album touches on a variety of genres, tunes like 'Remember to Breathe', 'Wreckin' Ball', 'Leave It Alone' are big full band mid-tempo blues rockers with huge drums, and screaming organ, and Campbell's nearly shouted vocals." Rob Dickens of Listening Through the Lens observed, "[He] combines a moving, gutsy, old-time sound that combines a bluesy drawl with a stomping, soulful slide guitar. His no-frills music reveals influences from The Band, Van Morrison, Townes Van Zandt and the raspy emotion of Ray Lamontagne."

== Track listing ==
MGM Distribution (ROCCD0002) Reckless Grace Music (RGM1-120)

All tracks are written by Owen Campbell (as Robert Owen Campbell)

The Pilgrim
No.	Title	Length
1.	"Wrecking Ball"	3:24
2.	"Leave It Alone"	4:46
3.	"You Know I'm Gone"	2:31
4.	"Cried for Yesterday"	5:00
5.	"It Don't Mean a Thing"	3:59
6.	"Dev'lish Woman"	4:04
7.	"Remember to Breathe"	4:09
8.	"Bukhu's Blues" (Mongolian instrumental)	2:32
9.	"New Year's Eve"	3:14
10.	"Highway Bound"	2:45
11.	"A Better Place"	3:54
