= Always Beside You =

2022 single by Coterie and Six60

Single by Coterie featuring Six60

from the album Coterie
- Released: 9 December 2022
- Genre: pop; reggae; dub
- Length: 3:02
- Label: Massive Records
- Songwriters: Brandford Fisher; Conrad Fisher; Joshua Fisher; Matiu Walters; Tyler Fisher
- Producers: Coterie; Marlon Gerbes

Coterie singles chronology
"Shame" (2022)	"Always Beside You" (2022)	"Slice of Heaven" (2023)

Six60 singles chronology
"Never Been Tonight" (2022)	"Always Beside You" (2022)

Music video
- "Always Beside You" ft. SIX60 on YouTube

"Always Beside You" is a song by Australian-New Zealand band Coterie sung in collaboration with New Zealand band Six60. It was released as a single in December 2022 on the same date as their debut album Coterie.

== Background and composition ==
Coterie first met New Zealand band Six60 in 2021, after Coterie performed a cover of a Six60 song on Instagram. After Six60 reached out to the band, Coterie flew from Perth to Auckland a few days later for the groups' first recording sessions together. The song was written by the bands during these first sessions. The lyrics were written to express camaraderie, brotherhood, and the connection and appreciation that the members of Coterie and Six60 feel for each other.

== Release ==
The song was released on the same day as their album Coterie, and paired with the formal debut of Massive Records as a music label. A music video for the song was also released on the same day. The video features footage from the Six60 Saturdays concerts where Coterie performed as a support act.

== Credits and personnel ==
- Coterie – performer, producer
- Robby De Sá – assistant producer
- Marlon Gerbes – producer, engineer
- Antoni Fisher – engineer
- Brandford Fisher – songwriter
- Conrad Fisher – songwriter
- Joshua Fisher – songwriter
- Tyler Fisher – songwriter
- Raúl López – mixing engineer
- Six60 – performer
- Matiu Walters – songwriter
- Hector Vega – mastering engineer

== Charts ==
Chart (2022–23)	Peak position
New Zealand Hot Singles (Recorded Music NZ)	5
New Zealand Artist Singles (Recorded Music NZ)	4

== Certifications ==
Region	Certification	Certified units/sales
New Zealand (RMNZ)	Platinum	30,000^{‡}
^{‡} Sales+streaming figures based on certification alone.
