= Eleven (Tina Arena album) =

Studio album by Tina Arena
- Released: 30 October 2015
- Recorded: Melbourne, Sydney, London, Stockholm, Paris
- Genre: Pop
- Length: 44:40
- Labels: Positive Dream; EMI
- Producers: Jon Hume; Youth; Michael Rendall; Ash Howe; Joe Cross; Michael Fatkin

Tina Arena chronology
Reset (2013)	Eleven (2015)	Greatest Hits & Interpretations (2017)

Singles from Eleven
- 1. "I Want to Love You" Released: 4 September 2015

Professional ratings
Review scores
Source	Rating
The Guardian	4/5 stars
Herald Sun	4/5 stars
Entertainment Focus	4/5 stars

Eleven is the eleventh studio album (9 in English, 2 in French) released by Australian singer and songwriter Tina Arena. The album was released in Australia on 30 October 2015. The first single and only single, "I Want to Love You" was released on 4 September 2015. Arena described Eleven as a "personal album" that was "joyous to make". Arena hinted at a tour, saying "I'm looking forward to playing the songs for you live soon". This was further confirmed in a radio interview on 3AW on 1 September when Arena stated she would be on the road February–March 2016. The album was certified gold in Australia in 2016.

The album has been nominated for Best Adult Contemporary Album at the ARIA Music Awards of 2016.

== Background ==
Following on from her 2013 platinum selling release Reset and tour, Arena announced the release of her new album in August 2015.

In an interview on Today with Richard Wilkins on 2 September 2015, Arena confirmed the album was recorded in Melbourne, Sydney, London, Stockholm and Paris. The album is described as a beautiful, complex, state-of-the-art collection of emotive, electronica-based songs. The album became available for pre-order on 4 September 2015. The digital version came with two instant download tracks; "Overload" and "I Want to Love You".

Arena has co-written tracks on the album with a number of people including Jon Hume, Hayley Warner and Tania Doko. On the song "Unravel Me" Arena tackles confusion and fear about the state of the world in general and social media in particular. She says "I'm quite bewildered by how much the human being has changed. How disconnected and isolated we've become. It saddens me. Part of the light in human beings has gone".

The title refers to the total number of studio albums Arena has released in her career spanning 40 years. The tally includes her first studio album with John Bowles, 1977's Tiny Tina and Little John to 2013's Reset and her two in French.

== Singles ==
- "I Want to Love You" was officially serviced to Australian media on 30 August and released on iTunes on 4 September. The song peaked at number 72 on the ARIA Charts.

== Promotion ==
Arena debuted the first new material from the album on 9 August 2015 when she performed an acoustic version of "Overload" live during an interview with Terry Wogan on his BBC Radio 2 program Weekend Wogan. During the same interview, she also performed an acoustic cover of Kate Bush's "The Man with the Child in His Eyes", which appeared on Arena's seventh studio album Songs of Love & Loss released in 2007.

On 6 September 2015, Arena performed "I Want to Love You" on Dancing with the Stars. To promote its release she sold signed CDs at a music store in Melbourne. She told Cameron Adams of News Corp Australia that "The registers were awfully complicated. When you're in a situation like this you realise you can't make mistakes."

== Track listing ==
Standard edition
No.	Title	Writer(s)	Producer(s)	Length
1.	"Unravel Me"	Tina Arena; Adam Argyle; Hunter Nixon; Jon Hume	Jon Hume	4:27
2.	"Overload"	Arena; Hayley Warner; Hume	Jon Hume	3:23
3.	"I Want to Love You"	Arena; Hume; Warner; Ben Fielding; Tom Jordan; Penelope Austin	Jon Hume	5:14
4.	"Colours"	Arena; Hayley Aitken; Alex Shield	Alex Sheild	3:54
5.	"Not Still in Love with You"	Arena; Kate Miller-Heidke; Hume	Jon Hume	3:57
6.	"When You're Ready"	Arena; Hume; Miller-Heidke	Jon Hume	3:40
7.	"Wouldn't Be Love If It Didn't"	Arena; Argyle; Warner	Youth	3:52
8.	"Magic"	Arena; Argyle; Warner	Youth and Howes	3:31
9.	"Lie in It"	Arena; Warner; Hume	Jon Hume	4:00
10.	"Karma"	Arena; Anders Wollbeck; Mattias Lindblom	Michael Rendall	4:41
11.	"Love Falls"	Arena; Wollbeck; Lindblom	Youth	4:01

Deluxe edition bonus tracks
No.	Title	Writer(s)	Producer(s)	Length
12.	"Heaven"	Arena; Warner; David Ryan Harris; Michael Fatkin	Michael Fatkin	3:38
13.	"No Filter"	Arena; Tania Doko; Peter Mansson; Christian Fast	Joseph Cross	3:58
14.	"Walk with You"	Arena; Hume; Nixon	Jon Hume	3:40

== Charts ==
Eleven debuted at number 2 in Australia, behind If I Can Dream by Elvis Presley.

=== Weekly charts ===
Weekly chart performance for Eleven
Chart (2015)	Peak position
Australian Albums (ARIA)	2

=== Year-end charts ===
Year-end chart performance for Eleven
Chart (2015)	Position
Australian Albums (ARIA)	59

== Certifications ==
Certifications for Eleven
Region	Certification	Certified units/sales
Australia (ARIA)	Gold	35,000^{^}
^{^} Shipments figures based on certification alone.

== Release history ==
List of release dates, showing region, formats, label and editions
Region	Date	Format(s)	Label	Edition(s)
Worldwide	30 October 2015	CD; digital download; vinyl	EMI Records	Standard edition; Deluxe edition
