= You Set Fire to My Life =

Single by Tina Arena

from the album Reset
- Released: September 27, 2013
- Recorded: 2013
- Genre: Pop
- Length: 4:13
- Label: EMI Records
- Songwriters: Anders Wollbeck, Mattias Lindblom, Tina Arena

Tina Arena singles chronology
"Voici les clés" (2011)	"You Set Fire to My Life" (2013)	"Reset All" (2013)

Music video
- "You Set Fire To My Life" on YouTube

"You Set Fire to My Life" is a song by Australian singer Tina Arena. It was recorded for her tenth studio album Reset and was released as its lead single on 27 September 2013. The video released on 15 October 2013 via Arena's Vevo account.

== Background ==
In August 2013, it was announced that Tina Arena would be returning with new single and a new album. "You Set Fire to My Life" is the lead single and it is about the loves of her life, her partner Vincent Mancini and her son Gabriel.Arena said, "The song is about them allowing me to shine, like I hope I allow them to do also." she added, "It's the great thing about being in a relationship where you know there's genuine love with a man who inspires me and challenges me, both intellectually and spiritually. I guess it is a tribute to him. When you do find someone you are on the same page with, it's a beautiful thing."

== Promotion ==
In October, Arena promoted the single on Sunrise and Dancing with the Stars. On October 21, 2013, Arena performed "You Set Fire to My Life" on The X Factor live results show.

== Reviews ==
Brendan Veevers of Renowned for Sound gave the track 5/5 and stated, "'You Set Fire to My Life' is a mid-tempo ballad on a mission to pull at your heartstrings. The track is made up of a gentle and instrumentally minimalistic verse and an up beat but sentimentally exquisite chorus that does a fantastic job at getting engrained into your head almost instantaneously." A review from Smooth FM said the song embodies "the spirit of the record".

== Track listing ==
"You Set Fire to My Life" was released on September 27, 2013. The single included an acoustic version of the song.

1. "You Set Fire to My Life" – 4:13
2. "You Set Fire to My Life" (acoustic) – 4:22

"The Remixes" was released on October 4, 2013 and included five versions of "You Set Fire to My Life".

1. "You Set Fire to My Life" (7th Heaven Radio Edit) – 4:16
2. "You Set Fire to My Life" (Cosmic Dawn Radio Edit) – 3:48
3. "You Set Fire to My Life" (7th Heaven Club Mix) – 7:17
4. "You Set Fire to My Life" (Cosmic Dawn Club Mix) – 6:02
5. "You Set Fire to My Life" (The Slips Light Up The Room Mix) – 4:54

== Charts ==
The single peaked at #38 on the Australian Singles Chart on November 3, 2013.

Chart (2013)	Peak position
Australia (ARIA)	38
