= Only Lonely (Tina Arena song) =

Song by Tina Arena

from the album Reset
- Released: 2013
- Genre: Pop
- Length: 3:25
- Label: EMI Records
- Songwriters: Tina Arena, Alex Hope, Roberto De Sa
- Producer: Roberto De Sa

Music video
- "Only Lonely" on YouTube

"Only Lonely" is a song by Australian singer Tina Arena. It was recorded for her ninth studio album Reset.

== Background ==
"Only Lonely" gained national interest after it was used in a commercial for the 2013 finale of Channel 7's Home and Away. Although it was not released as a single, it charted on the ARIA Singles Chart and peaked at #32 due to this promotion.

== Music video ==
The video clip was released on Arena's Vevo account on November 19, 2013. Arena stated, "Here it is, a humble thank you to my fans." The clip features Arena in the studio playing a piano. The video, shot in black and white, was reviewed as being "restrained, understated and very, very classy".

== Track listing ==
1. "Only Lonely" – 3:22

== Charts ==
The single peaked at #32 on the Australian Singles Chart on November 24, 2013. It peaked at #14 in the Australian iTunes Store.

Chart (2013)	Peak position
Australian Singles Chart	32
