= Owen Campbell (musician) =

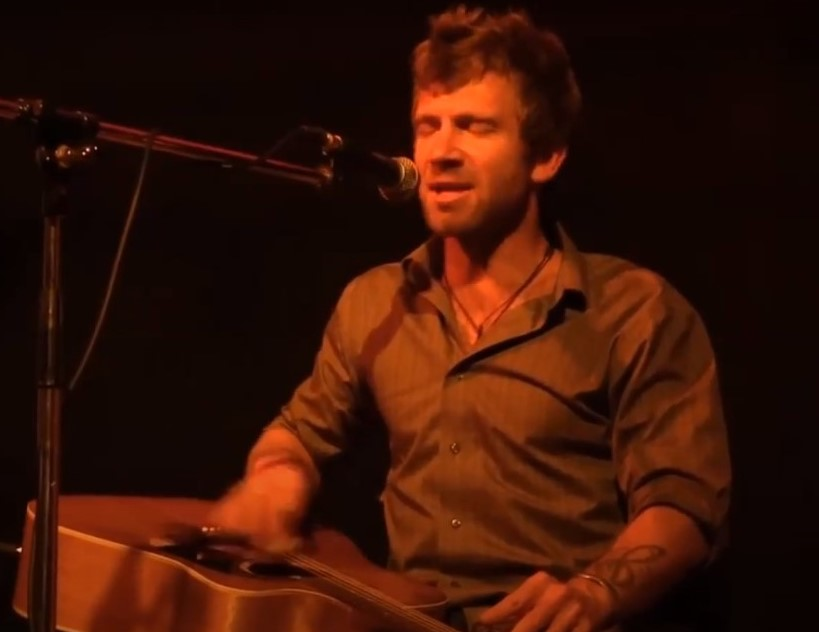

Background information
- Born: 29 March 1983 (age 41); Sydney, New South Wales, Australia
- Genres: Blues, folk
- Occupation(s): Musician, songwriter
- Instrument(s): Vocals, guitar, harmonica, banjo, stomp box
- Years active: 2002–present
- Website: www.owencampbellmusic.com

Owen Campbell (born 29 March 1983) is an Australian blues singer-songwriter and guitarist. He was a finalist in the sixth series of the TV show Australia's Got Talent.

Owen was given his first guitar by his parents when he was 9.

Owen spent most of his 20s traveling and busking around the world earning just enough performing to hop to the next city. It was his appearances on top rated Australian TV show Australia's Got Talent that properly launched his music career. Although he did not win the competition itself, he was a popular contestant.

His second album The Pilgrim expands on his signature blues style and features rock tracks, ballads, banjo and throat singing.

== Career ==
Prior to entering Australia's Got Talent, Owen had been busking and touring in many countries all over the world, such as India, Nepal, Denmark, Germany, Italy, and Ireland. Campbell's main influences include artists such as The Band, Van Morrison, Townes Van Zandt, and Johnny Cash. He employs a slide guitar technique on an open D tuning. Since 2012, his first album, Sunshine Road, has peaked number No. 1 in the Australian iTunes Blues Charts for nearly a year, and was ranked number No. 5 in five other countries. In 2013 he released his second album, The Pilgrim.

== Discography ==
- Mice on the wheel (2008)
- Sunshine Road (2011)
- The Pilgrim (2013)
- Songs for Syria (EP) (2014)
- In The Shadow of the Greats (EP) (2015)
- Breathing Bullets (2016)
- The Rolling thunder of love (2019)
- The bassement sessions – (acoustic album) (2019)
