= Coterie (album) =

2022 album by Coterie

Studio album by Coterie
- Released: 9 December 2022
- Genre: Pop; Pacific reggae
- Length: 43:16
- Label: Massive Records; Sony Music New Zealand; Sony Music Australia
- Producer: Coterie; Robby De Sa; Marlon Gerbes; Josh Fountain

Singles from Coterie
- 1. "Cool It Down" Released: 3 December 2021; 2. "Killing It Off" Released: 29 April 2022; 3. "West Coast Drive" Released: 9 September 2022; 4. "Deja Vu" Released: 18 November 2022; 5. "Shame" Released: 18 November 2022; 6. "Always Beside You" Released: 9 December 2022

Coterie is the debut studio album by Australian/New Zealand band Coterie, released in December 2022. Recorded in Mangawhai together with New Zealand band Six60 and at the band's home studio in Perth, the album was inspired by summer. The album reached number 13 in Australia and number six in New Zealand.

== Production ==
Coterie first met New Zealand band Six60 in 2021, after Coterie performed a cover of a Six60 song on Instagram. After Six60 reached out to the band, Coterie flew from Perth to Auckland days later for the groups' first recording sessions together. Coterie were signed as the first act on Massive Records, a music label created by a collaboration between Six60 and Sony Music New Zealand.

Most of the album was written on a trip to Mount Maunganui. Band member Tyler Fisher described the album as being inspired by summer, and "late night drives down the coast with the crew, that first hit of summer sun on your face".

"Cool It Down", was inspired by the band unable to return to New Zealand due to COVID-19 pandemic, and was recorded in the band's home studio in Perth, in their parents' living room. It was released as the first single from the album in December 2021, after which Coterie toured Australia as an opening act for Six60.

The album was recorded with Six60 at their studio in Mangawhai, with the rest of the album's recording taking place at Coterie's home studio in Perth.

== Release and promotion ==
"Cool It Down" was released as the first single from the album in December 2021, and became a major hit in New Zealand in early 2022. "Killing It Off" followed as the second single from the album in April after the success of "Cool It Down", and in early September the band released a Māori language version of "Cool It Down" called "Purea"; translated with help from Tīmoti Kāretu. A week later, "West Coast Drive" was released by the band as a single. "Deja Vu" and "Shame" were both released as singles on 18 November, paired with the announcement of the album.

The album was released on 9 December, the same day that Massive Records was officially launched. "Purea / Cool It Down" was included as a bonus track on the physical CD, cassette and vinyl record versions of the album. The album's final single "Always Beside You", a collaboration with Six60, was released as a single on the same day.

Coterie supported Six60 on their 2022/2023 summer tour of New Zealand and Australia. The band toured New Zealand in March 2023. Originally announced as a four-date tour, the band added additional performances in Raglan and Tauranga. Coterie performed an 11-date headlining tour of Australia in June.

== Track listing ==
Coterie track listing
No.	Title	Writer(s)	Length
1.	"Shakin' Her Body"	Antoni Fisher; Brandford Fisher; Conrad Fisher; Joshua Fisher; Marlon Gerbes; Matiu Walters; Tyler Fisher	2:58
2.	"Cool It Down"	A. Fisher; B. Fisher; C. Fisher; J. Fisher; T. Fisher	4:29
3.	"Honey Dance with Me"	A. Fisher; B. Fisher; C. Fisher; J. Fisher; T. Fisher	3:45
4.	"Deja Vu"	A. Fisher; B. Fisher; C. Fisher; J. Fisher; T. Fisher	3:07
5.	"Stepping Stone"	B. Fisher; C. Fisher; Dennis Dowlut; J. Fisher; Simon Olsen; T. Fisher	3:09
6.	"West Coast Drive"	B. Fisher; C. Fisher; Daniel Skeed; J. Fisher; T. Fisher	3:46
7.	"Always Beside You" (featuring Six60)	B. Fisher; C. Fisher; J. Fisher; Walters; T. Fisher	3:02
8.	"For the People"	A. Fisher; B. Fisher; C. Fisher; J. Fisher; T. Fisher	3:06
9.	"Feelin' It"	A. Fisher; B. Fisher; C. Fisher; J. Fisher; T. Fisher	2:58
10.	"Accidental Love"	A. Fisher; B. Fisher; C. Fisher; J. Fisher; T. Fisher	3:15
11.	"Sunkissed World"	B. Fisher; C. Fisher; Josh Fountain; J. Fisher; T. Fisher	2:59
12.	"Killing It Off"	A. Fisher; B. Fisher; C. Fisher; J. Fisher; T. Fisher	2:50
13.	"Shame"	A. Fisher; B. Fisher; J. Fisher; Gerbes; Walters; T. Fisher	3:57
Total length:			43:16

Coterie CD and vinyl bonus track
No.	Title	Writer(s)	Length
14.	"Purea / Cool It Down"	A. Fisher; B. Fisher; C. Fisher; J. Fisher; T. Fisher; Tīmoti Kāretu	4:39
Total length:			47:55

== Credits and personnel ==
- Coterie – performer, producer
- Robby De Sá – assistant producer (1, 7), producer (2–6, 8–10, 12), engineer (2, 12), mixing engineer (2, 12), assistant engineer (11)
- Dennis Dowlut – songwriter (5)
- Marlon Gerbes – producer (1, 3, 6–7, 13), songwriter (1, 13), assistant producer (5), engineer (7, 13)
- Antoni Fisher – songwriter (1–4, 8–10, 12–13), engineer (1–10, 12–13), assistant engineer (11)
- Brandford Fisher – songwriter (1–13)
- Conrad Fisher – songwriter (1–13)
- Joshua Fisher – songwriter (1–13), engineer (2)
- Tyler Fisher – songwriter (1–13)
- Josh Fountain – producer (11), songwriter (11)
- Toby Chew Lee – assistant producer (11)
- Raúl López – mixing engineer (1, 3–11, 13)
- Simon Olsen – songwriting (5)
- Liam Quinn – mastering engineer (12)
- Daniel Skeed – songwriting (6)
- Brody Simpson – engineer (6), assistant engineer (11)
- Six60 – performer (7)
- Greg Stace – engineer (4, 10)
- Paul Stefanidis – mastering engineer (2)
- Matiu Walters – songwriter (1, 7, 13)
- Hector Vega – mastering engineer (1, 3–11, 13)

== Charts ==
Weekly chart performance for Coterie
Chart (2022)	Peak position
Australian Albums (ARIA)	13
New Zealand Albums (RMNZ)	6

== Certifications ==
Certifications for Coterie
Region	Certification	Certified units/sales
New Zealand (RMNZ)	Gold	7,500^{‡}
^{‡} Sales+streaming figures based on certification alone.

== Release history ==
Release dates and formats for Coterie
Region	Date	Format(s)	Label(s)	Ref.
Various	9 December 2022	CD; cassette; digital download; streaming	Massive Record; Sony Music Australia; Sony Music New Zealand	
New Zealand	23 April 2023	Vinyl	Massive Record; Sony Music New Zealand	
