= 2018 Australian Women in Music Awards =

Edition of annual Australian Women in Music Awards

- Date: 10 October 2018
- Venue: Brisbane Powerhouse, Brisbane, Queensland
- Website: womeninmusicawards.com.au

The 2018 Australian Women in Music Awards is the inaugural Australian Women in Music Awards. The event took place on 10 October 2018.

Nominations for the awards were open until 12 July 2018 and finalists were announced on 3 September 2018.

Queensland Minister for Women, Di Farmer said "Women make up almost half of Australians with a music qualification and half of those studying music – yet only one-fifth of songwriters are women. Women hold only 28 per cent of senior and strategic roles in key industry associations and female artists earn less in general than their male counterparts. I congratulate the Australian Women in Music Awards committee for their work towards encouraging more girls and women in to the music industry."

== AWMA Honour Roll ==
- Helen Reddy

== Lifetime Achievement Awards ==
- Patricia Amphlett (Little Pattie), Renée Geyer & Margret RoadKnight.

== Nominees and winners ==
=== AWMA Awards ===
Winners indicated in boldface, with other nominees in plain.

Full list of nominees
Educator Award	Diversity in Music Award
**Dr Anita Collins**; Louise Denson; Elizabeth Sellars	**Mission Songs Project**; Rachel Maria Cox; Signal Creative
Auriel Andrew Memorial Award (Recognises a true pioneer of Aboriginal women in music)	Studio Production Award
**Deborah Cheetham**; Jessie Lloyd; Shellie Morris; Tiddas; Gina Williams	**Anna Laverty**; Kath Naunton; Becki Whitton
Live Production Award	Music Leadership Award
**Robyn Jelleff**; Lynette Britten; Kait Hall	**Jen Cloher**; Linda Bosidis; Susan Heymann
Songwriter Award	Breakthrough Artist Award
**Sophie Payten (Gordi)**; Sarah Blasko; Ngaiire	**Camp Cope**; **Amy Shark**; Stella Donnelly
Music Photographer Award	Film-maker Award
**Wendy McDougall**; Tashi Hall; Lisa Businovski	**Claudia Sangiorgi Dalimore**; Gemma Lee; Ruth Morris
Artistic Excellence Award	Creative Leadership Award
**Ngaiire**; Dallas Frasca; Sophie Payten (Gordi)	**Zoe Hauptmann**; Katie Noonan; Roz Pappalardo
Musical Excellence Award	
**Lydia Davies, Nerida Tyson-Chew**; Fem Belling	
