= Fem Belling =

Australian jazz vocalist

Fem Belling (born 6 December 1978) is a South African-born, Australian jazz vocalist and violinist with a dual career in stage musicals and jazz singing. Belling was raised in Johannesburg and later moved to Cape Town to establish a career in musical theatre before moving to London as a leading lady in the West End. Lead roles include Hairspray, Fame, Footloose, Cats (original South African cast) and Liza Minnelli in the 2011 production of The Boy from Oz starring Todd McKenney.

Belling claims 5 Vita awards, a Green Room Award nomination for Best Leading Actress in the Musical Genesis to Broadway and shares an ARIA nomination from her involvement in The Public Opinion Afro Orchestra.

== Theatre career ==
Cats as Jennyanydots / Bombalina, Footloose as Rusty / Elanor, Austentatious as Emily, Hairspray as Shelly / Tracey Turnblad (original West End cast ), Fame, Debbie Does Dallas as Donna (original UK and South African cast), Annie Get Your Gun as Gigi / Dolly (National UK tour), Joseph And The Amazing Technecolour Dreamcoat as the Narrator, Jesus Christ Superstar as Soul Girl, Little Shop of Horrors as Audrey, Nunsense Jamboree as Sister Mary Leo, Oklahoma as Ensemble, Summer Holiday as Alma / Barbera, Rocky Horror Show 25th Jubilee Tour as Phantom / Columbia / Janet (2011), The Boy From Oz as Liza Minnelli, Genesis To Broadway (2013) as Fem Belling, Dear Blossom (2013) as Blossom Dearie, Sexercise the musical (2015) as Rhonda.

== Television career ==
Dora (Fem Belling) is a henchwoman/helicopter pilot in the 2001 comedy film Mr. Bones.

== Music career ==
In 2007, Belling moved to Melbourne, Australia to be with family and pursue her passion for jazz. In 2014, she auditioned for The Voice Australia and reached the Super Battle round.

== Discography ==
=== Studio albums ===
| Title | Details |
|---|---|
| Family | Released: 7 December 2013; Label: Rearear; Formats: CD, digital download |
| Now Then | Released: 29 December 2016; Label: Fem Belling; Formats: CD, digital download |

== Awards and nominations ==
=== Australian Women in Music Awards ===
The Australian Women in Music Awards is an annual event that celebrates outstanding women in the Australian Music Industry who have made significant and lasting contributions in their chosen field. They commenced in 2018.

| Year | Nominee / work | Award | Result |
|---|---|---|---|
| 2018 | Fem Billing | Musical Excellence Award | Nominated |
