= Robby De Sá =

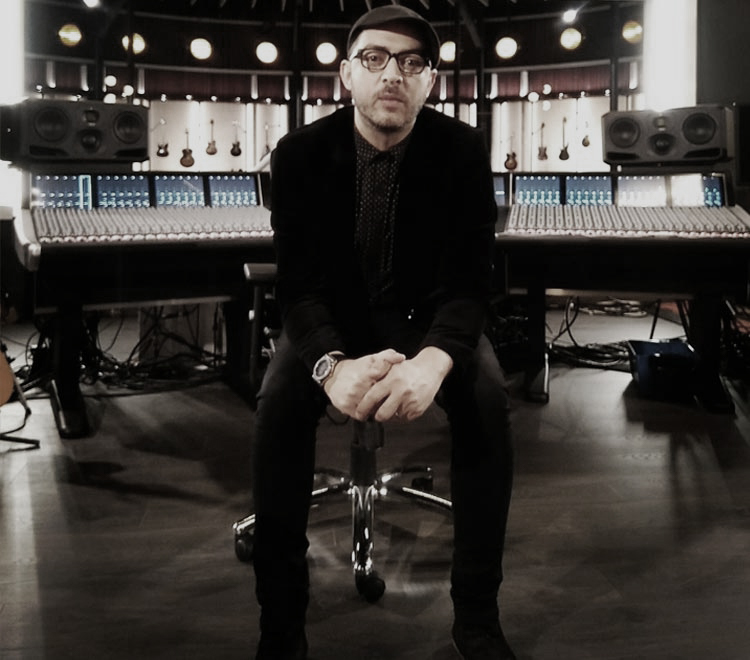
- Robby De Sá

Background information
- Born: Potchefstroom, South Africa
- Genres: Pop, indie pop
- Occupations: Music producer, songwriter, musician
- Instruments: Guitar, electric guitar, keys, drums
- Years active: 1999–present
- Label: Sony/ATV Music Publishing
- Website: www.robbydesa.com

Robby De Sá is a producer, songwriter, and multi-instrumentalist from Potchefstroom in South Africa. He attended Potchefstroom High School for Boys and North-West University.

== Career ==
Based in Sydney, he has worked with many artists, songwriters and producers including The Veronicas, MAY-A, Gretta Ray, Busby Marou, Mitch James, Tina Arena, Pamela Shayne, 5 Seconds of Summer, and Stan Walker. He (along with others) was reported to be one of 'Australia's most accomplished songwriters' in November 2013.

== Credits ==
=== Discography ===
Artist	Album	Song	Release date	Credit
Coterie	Coterie	"Honey Dance with Me"	2022	Co-producer
Coterie	Coterie	"Deja Vu"	2022	Co-producer
Coterie	Coterie	"Stepping Stone"	2022	Co-producer
Coterie	Coterie	"West Coast Drive"	2022	Co-producer
Coterie	Coterie	"For the People"	2022	Co-producer
Coterie	Coterie	"Feelin' It"	2022	Co-producer
Coterie	Coterie	"Accidental Love"	2022	Co-producer
Coterie	Coterie	"Killing It Off"	2022	Co-producer
Coterie	Coterie	"Cool It Down"	2021	Co-producer
The Veronicas	Human	Without You	2021	Co-writer/co-producer
The Veronicas	Human	Jealous	2021	Co-writer/co-producer
MAY-A	Green - Single	Green	2020	Co-writer/Producer
The McClymonts	Mayhem to Madness	Open Heart	2020	Co-writer
The McClymonts	Mayhem to Madness	Free Fall	2020	Co-writer
Shannen James	Collide - Single	Collide	2020	Co-writer
The Veronicas	Human (The Veronicas album)	Think of Me - Single	2019	Co-writer/Producer
Busby Marou	The Great Divide	Best of Times	2019	Co-writer
MAY-A	Fools Paradise - Single	Fools Paradise	2019	Co-writer/Producer
Eilish Gilligan	Keep Up - Single	Keep Up	2019	Co-writer/Producer
Mitch James	Mitch James	Can't Help Myself	2018	Co-writer/Producer
Matt Gresham	Who Am I Now	Rising Up	2018	Co-writer/Producer
Matt Gresham	Who Am I Now	Who Am I Now	2018	Co-writer/Producer
Marcelo	Skin and Bones - Single	Skin and Bones	1 December 2016	Co-writer/Producer
Gavin Edwards	Silver Skies	Beautiful Morning	21 October 2016	Co-writer
In Stereo	She's Rock n Roll - EP	Good Times	1 April 2016	Co-writer/Producer
Joe Moore	A Thousand Lifetimes	A Thousand Lifetimes	6 November 2015	Co-writer
Joe Moore	A Thousand Lifetimes	Miss You	6 November 2015	Co-writer
Joe Moore	A Thousand Lifetimes	Without You	6 November 2015	Co-writer
Dami Im	Heart Beats	Heart So Dry	25 September 2014	Co-writer/Producer
Taylor Henderson	Burnt Letters	Sail Away	11 July 2014	Co-writer/Producer
Stan Walker	Inventing Myself	Time To Save Our Love	25 October 2013	Co-writer/Co-Producer
Stan Walker	Inventing Myself	Hurricane	25 October 2013	Co-writer/Co-Producer
Tina Arena	Reset	Only Lonely	18 October 2013	Co-writer/Producer
Tina Arena	Reset	Lose Myself	18 October 2013	Co-writer
Brian McFadden	Non-album single	Time To Save Our Love	29 September 2013	Co-writer
Ben Hazlewood	Loveless – EP	Twice	23 April 2013	Co-writer
Ben Hazlewood	Loveless – EP	Knock on My Window	23 April 2013	Co-writer
Brittany Cairns	Brittany Cairns EP	Behind The Scenes	22 March 2013	Co-writer

=== Performing credits ===
Artist	Tour	Location	Year	Credit
Tina Arena	'Reset' Tour	Australia	2014	Guitarist
Emma Birdsall	OneRepublic 'Native' support act	Australia	2013	Musical Director & Guitarist
Brian McFadden	Ronan Keating 'Fires' support act	UK and Australia	2013	Guitarist
Rachael Leahcar	Rachael Leahcar Tour	Australia	2013	Musical Director & Guitarist

== Early Career and Franklin ==
Roberto Manuel De Sá (Robby) has been a professional guitarist since 1999 when he joined South African band 'Allegory' in Johannesburg, South Africa. In 2002, after the band completed a contract for Sun City International, he moved to Ireland with vocalist Gavin Edwards at the request of ex-Westlife member Brian McFadden and formed the band 'Franklin' with several other South African musicians. They were signed to Brian's own label (Pig Records) in Ireland. Robby co-wrote and released the single "You" in June 2004 which led to the Top 20 hit for the band in Ireland. Franklin performed at many of the Ireland's high-profile events such as Oxegen, Michelstown Festival and O2 in The Park. The band also supported Incubus at the Point Depot, Dublin in May 2004. As a session musician Robby has performed and toured with Enrique Iglesias, Il Divo, Westlife, Brian Mcfadden, Charley Pride, Shakin Stevens, Delta Goodrem and Ben Mills.

=== Vanda and Young Songwriting Competition 2013 ===
Robby was a co-writer of the song 'Paperthin' which placed second in the 2013 'Vanda & Young Songwriting Competition'

=== Only Lonely ===
Robby co-wrote and produced the Tina Arena song Only Lonely (from her album Reset), which featured in a commercial for the 2013 season finale of Australian soap opera Home and away . The song peaked at No. 32 on the Australian Aria Singles Chart on 24 November 2013 and peaked at No. 14 in the Australian iTunes Store
