= I Want to Love You =

Single by Tina Arena

from the album Eleven
- Released: September 4, 2015
- Recorded: 2015
- Genre: Pop
- Length: 5:15
- Label: EMI Records
- Songwriters: Tina Arena; Jon Hume; Hayley Warner; Ben Fielding; Tom Jordan; Penelope Austin
- Producers: Tina Arena; Jon Hume

Tina Arena singles chronology
"The Things We Do for Love" (2014)	"I Want to Love You" (2015)	"Chains" (2015)

Music video
- "I Want to Love You" on YouTube

"I Want to Love You" is a song by Australian singer Tina Arena. It was recorded for her eleventh studio album, Eleven and was released as its lead and only single in September 2015. On 6 September 2015, Arena performed "I Want to Love You" on Dancing with the Stars.

Arena explained, "It speaks about being consumed and completely infatuated with someone but knowing they're possibly not right for you or that the relationship won't work despite how desperately you want it to. I think we've all been there at some point!" The song peaked at number 72 on the ARIA Singles Chart.

== Music video ==
The video released on 20 September 2015 via Arena's Vevo account. The black-and-white video was inspired by American photographer Cindy Sherman and stars Vince Colosimo. Arena told Sydney Confidential: "I couldn't imagine the clip with anyone but Vince. I think his vulnerability as an actor is not often portrayed and it's something I trusted he could bring. His honesty, elasticity and reliability as an actor is something I am in awe of."

== Charts ==
The single peaked at 72 on the ARIA Charts, becoming Arena's 21st top 100 singles chart entry.

Chart (2016)	Peak position
Australia (ARIA)	72
