= The Voice (Australian TV series) season 4 =

The Voice
- Season 4
- Promotional poster featuring coaches Madden Brothers, Martin, Jessie J, and Goodrem
- Hosted by: Darren McMullen; Sonia Kruger
- Judges: Ricky Martin; Jessie J Delta Goodrem; The Madden Brothers
- Winner: Ellie Drennan
- Winning coach: Jessie J
- Runner-up: Joe Moore

Release
- Original network: Nine Network
- Original release: 28 June – 30 August 2015

Season chronology
- ← Previous; Season 3 Next → Season 5

The fourth season of The Voice premiered on 28 June 2015. Ricky Martin and Joel Madden returned as coaches for the fourth season, with Madden pairing up with his brother, Benji Madden as a duo. In January 2015, it was announced that Jessie J would join the coaching line-up as well Delta Goodrem, who would return to the panel after a one-season hiatus; replacing former judges will.i.am and Kylie Minogue, respectively. This is the first season to feature two female coaches on the show. On 22 February 2015, it was announced that Sonia Kruger would be joining the fourth season as a co-host with Darren McMullen.

Ellie Drennan was declared the winner on 30 August, marking Jessie J's first and only win as coach, as well as the first female coach to win a season of the show. As of 2026, 2-chair turn contestant Drennan is the only (so far) winner in fifteen seasons not to have a 4-chair turn in the blind auditions.

This season is the last to feature Ricky Martin. He is replaced by Boyzone singer and former The X Factor Australia judge, Ronan Keating, in Season 5.

== Teams ==
Coaches and Host(s) of The Voice Season 4

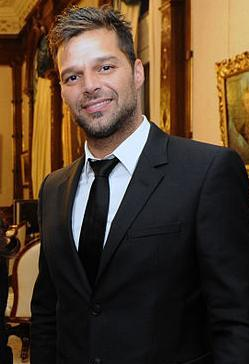
Ricky Martin

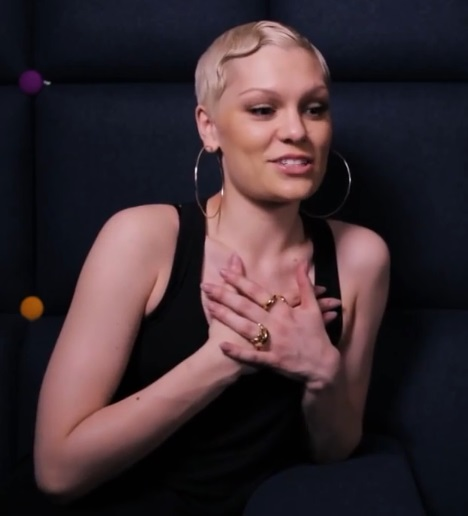
Jessie J

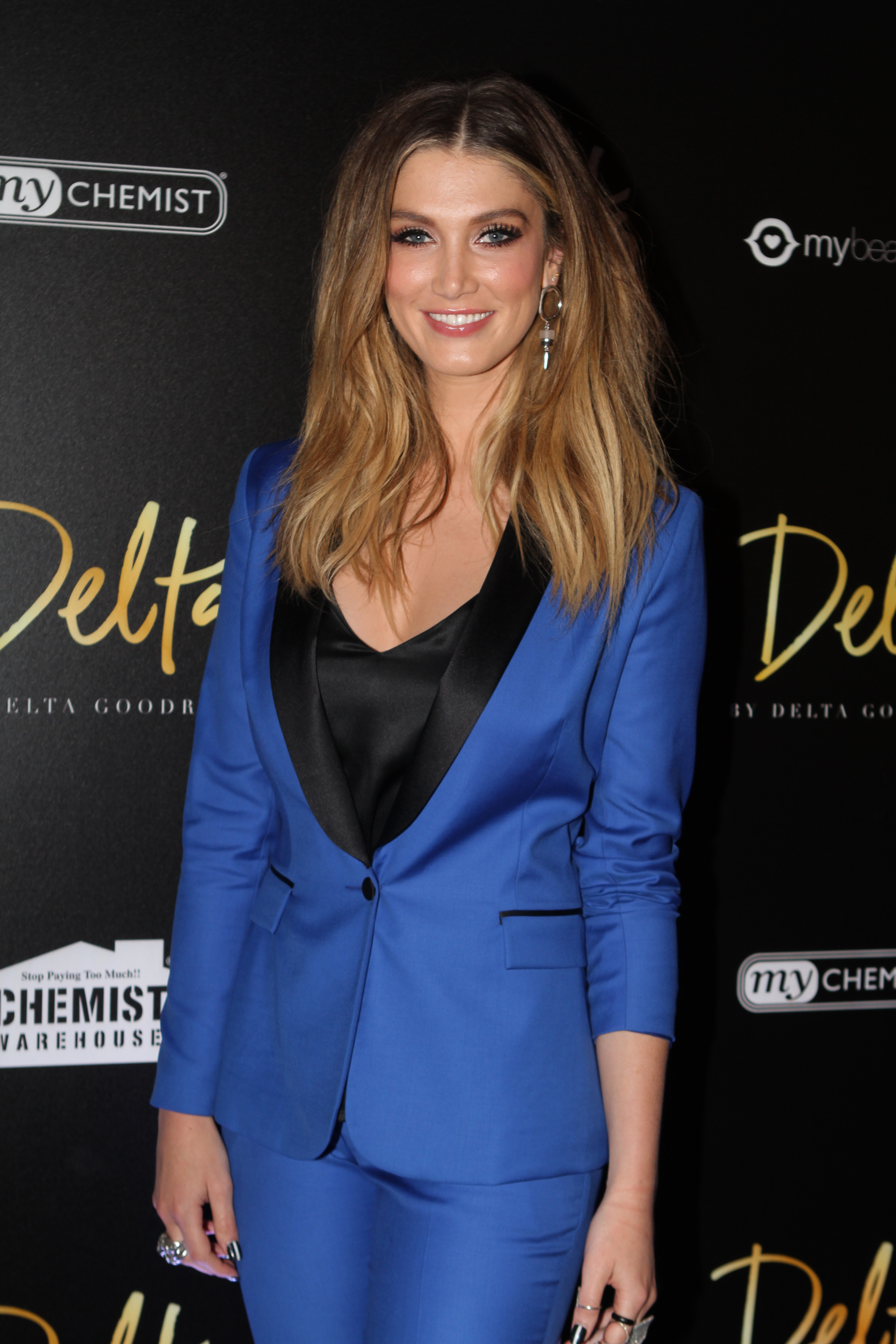
Delta Goodrem

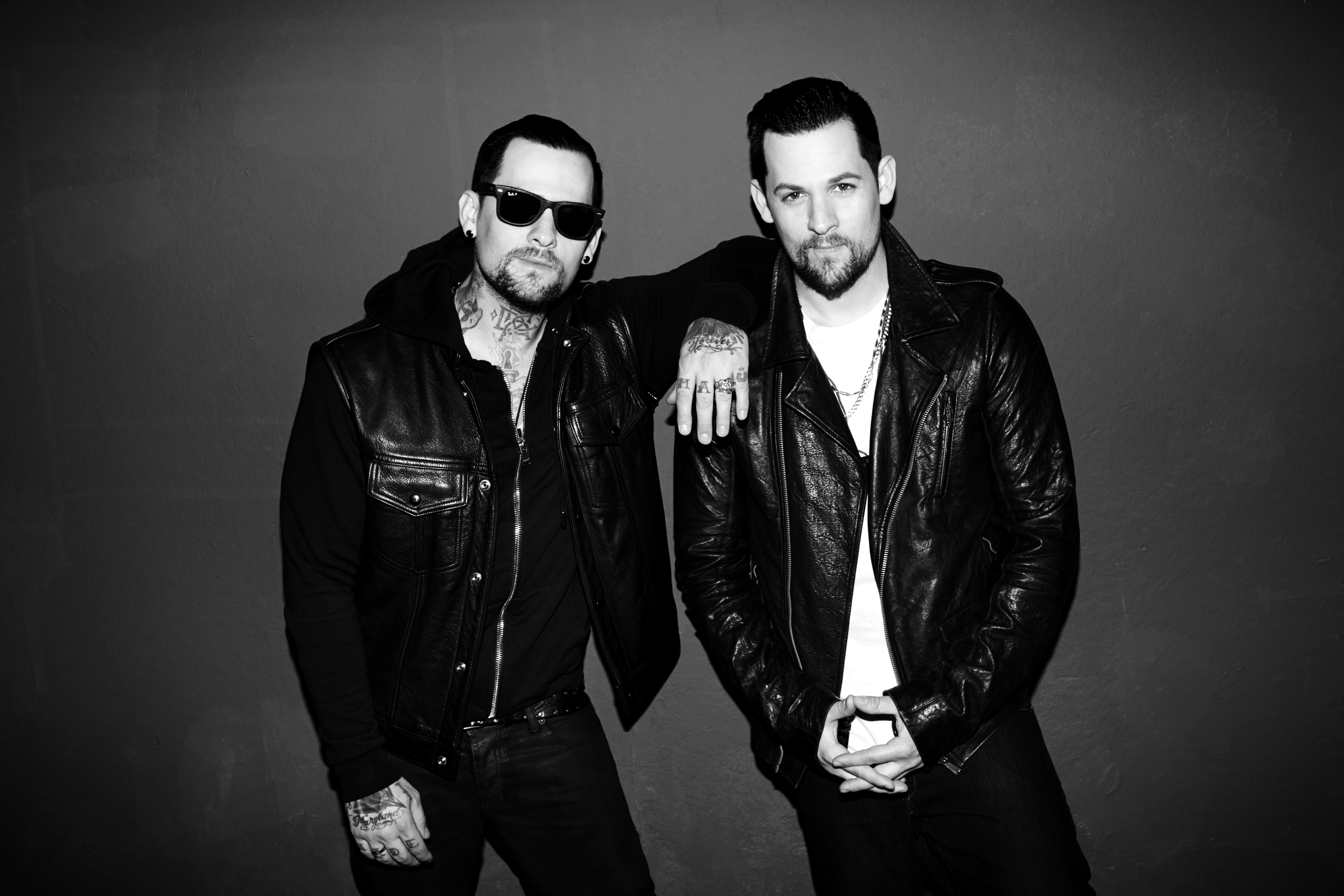
The Madden Brothers

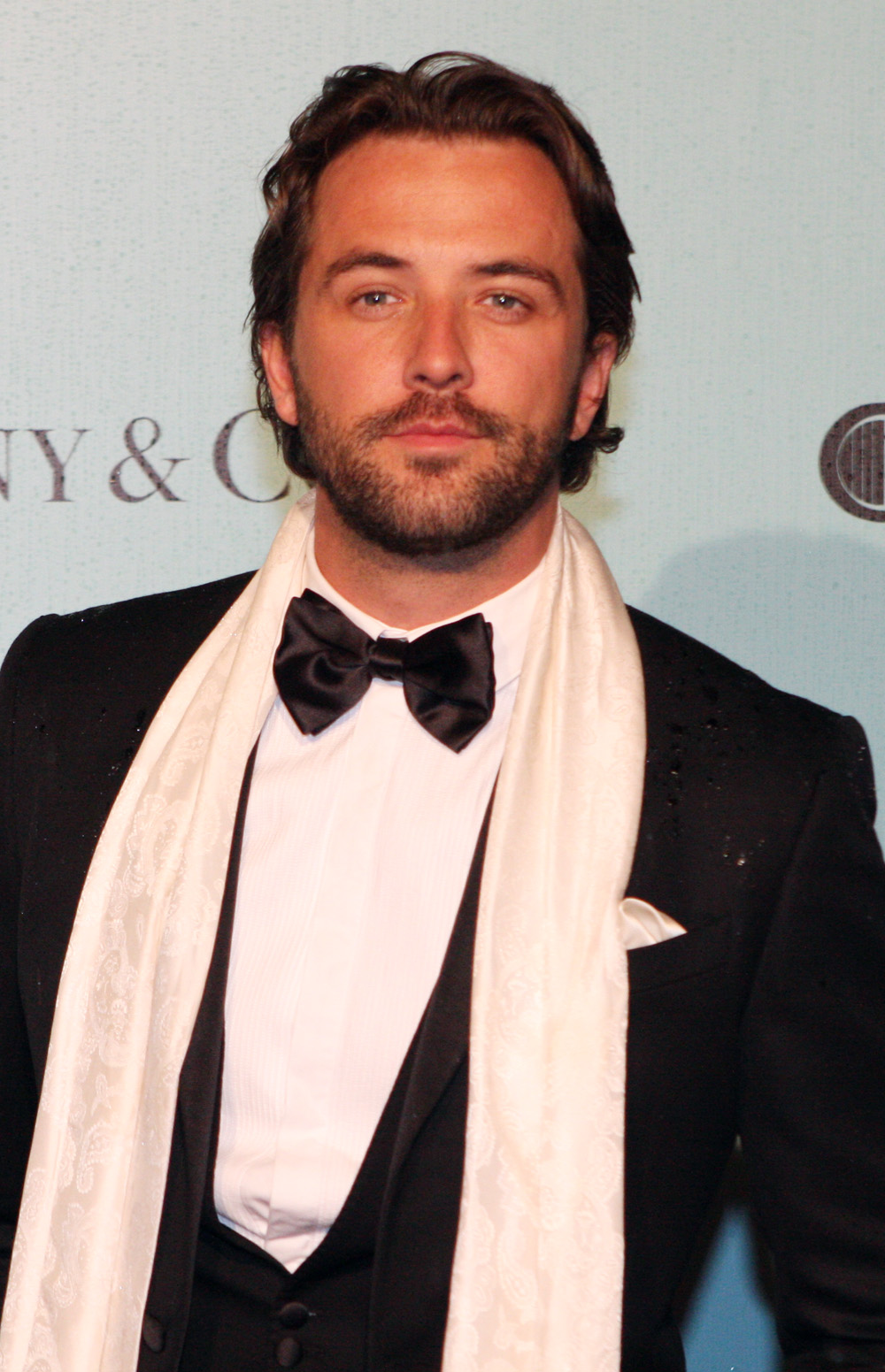
Darren McMullen (host)

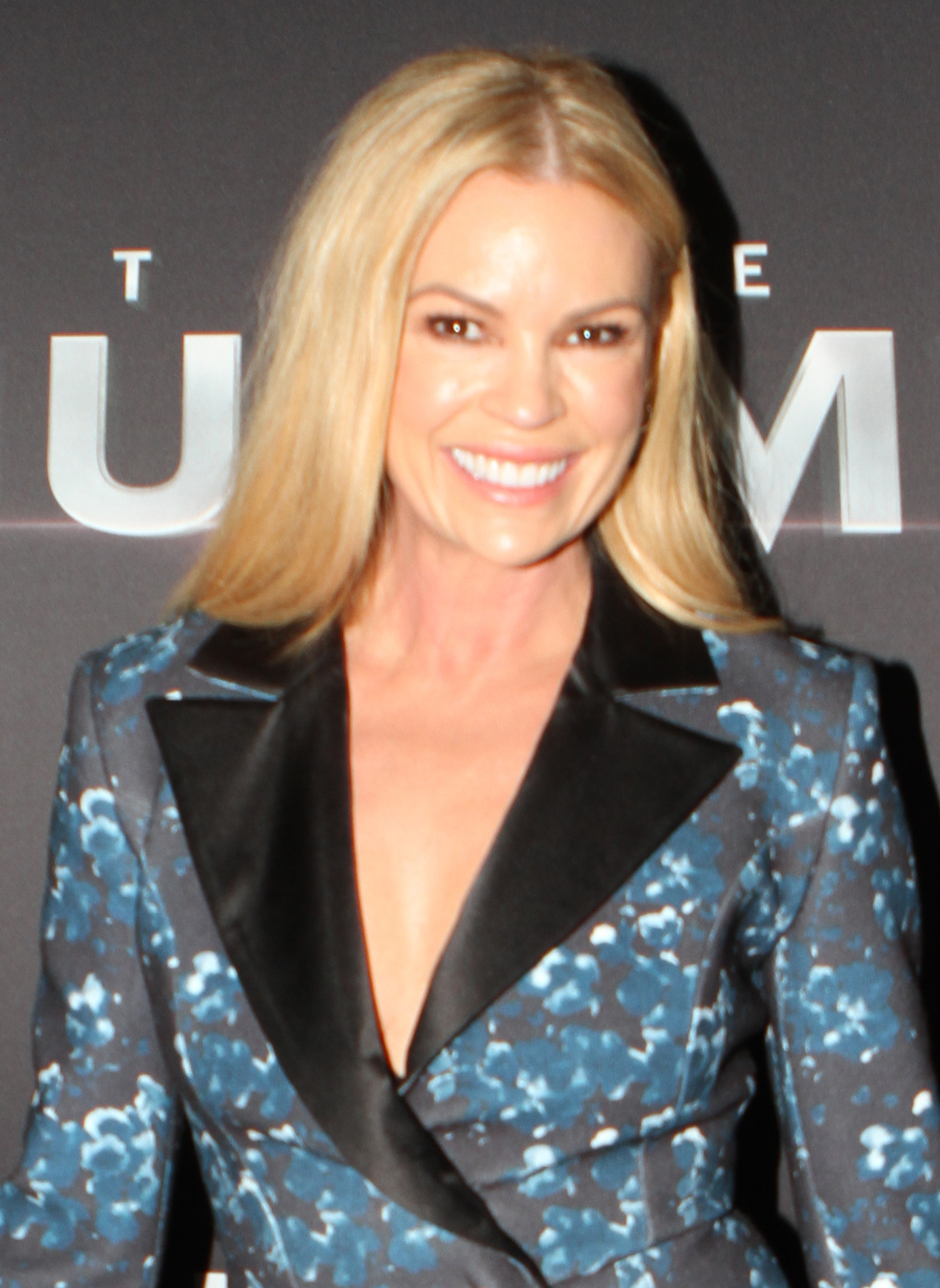
Sonia Kruger (host)

Color key

- Winner
- Runner-up
- Third place
- Fourth place
- Eliminated in the Live shows
- Eliminated in the Super Battle round
- Artist was saved at the Battle rounds
- Eliminated in the Battle rounds

Coach	Artists				
Ricky Martin					
Ricky Martin	Liam Maihi	Naomi Price	Gail Page	Scott Newnham	Aviida
Ricky Martin	Stewart Winchester	Dione Baker	Tim McCallum	Adam Spain-Mostina	Deanna Rose
Ricky Martin	Jeremy Ryan	Rene McGovern	Mark Stefanoff	Lizé Heerman	
Jessie J					
Jessie J	Ellie Drennan	Simi Vuata	Amber Nichols	Cath Adams	Chris Hoskin
Jessie J	Jason Howell	Ethan Conway	Mahalate Teshome	~~Stewart Winchester~~	~~Fem Belling~~
Jessie J	Shyjana Terzioska	Paris Cassar	Laz Chester	Ollie Kirk	
Delta Goodrem					
Delta Goodrem	Lyndall Wennekes	Caleb Jago-Ward	Rik-E-Ragga	Nicolas Duquemin	Stephen McCulloch
Delta Goodrem	Fem Belling	Grace Pitts	Mikhail Laxton	~~Aviida~~	~~Jake Howden~~
Delta Goodrem	~~Nina Baumer~~	Jo De Goldi	Keely Brittain	James Sieff	
The Madden Brothers					
The Madden Brothers	Joe Moore	Nathan Hawes	Peta Evans-Taylor	Tameaka Powell	Jake Howden
The Madden Brothers	Nina Baumer	Renee Pounsett	Sarah Valentine	~~Amber Nichols~~	~~Jason Howell~~
The Madden Brothers	~~Mikhail Laxton~~	Monty Cotton	Claudia Migliaccio	Chantelle Morrell	
Note: Italicized names are stolen artists (names struck through within former teams).

== Blind auditions ==
Color key

✔	Coach hit the "I/WE WANT YOU" button
	Artist defaulted to this team
	Artist elected to join this team
	Artist eliminated with no coach pressing "I/WE WANT YOU" button
	Artist received an 'All Turn'.

=== Episode 1 (28 June) ===
The coaches performed a cover of "Bang Bang" together at the start of the show.

Order	Artist	Age	Song	Coaches and artists choices			
Order	Artist	Age	Song	Ricky	Jessie	Delta	Joel & Benji
1	Paris Cassar	16	"Out Here on My Own"	—	✔	—	✔
2	Annaleese Fuda	18	"Clarity"	—	—	—	—
3	Nicolas Duquemin	17	"XO"	—	—	✔	✔
4	Chris Hoskin	25	"Fall At Your Feet"	✔	✔	✔	✔
5	Tanya George	21	"Seven Nation Army"	—	—	—	—
6	Elliot Freeman	N/A	"I'm Yours"	—	—	—	—
7	Naomi Anastasia	19	"All About That Bass"	—	—	—	—
8	Matthew Herne	30	"This Is the Moment"	—	—	—	—
9	Rik-E-Ragga	31	"Get Up, Stand Up"	—	✔	✔	—
10	Gail Page	51	"(You Make Me Feel Like) A Natural Woman"	✔	—	✔	✔

=== Episode 2 (29 June) ===
Order	Artist	Age	Song	Coaches and artists choices			
Order	Artist	Age	Song	Ricky	Jessie	Delta	Joel & Benji
1	Cath Adams	30	"Work It Out"	—	✔	✔	✔
2	Ollie Kirk	19	"Thinking Out Loud"	—	✔	✔	✔
3	Almaryse Burton	40	"Groove Is in the Heart"	—	—	—	—
4	Aviida (Paula & Clay)	38 & 28	"One and Only"	—	—	✔	✔
5	Scott Newnham	26	"Red"	✔	—	✔	✔
6	Glenn Philip	40	"Save Tonight"	—	—	—	—
7	Lyndall Wennekes	19	"Beautiful Disaster"	—	—	✔	✔
8	Amber Nichols	32	"Strong"	✔	✔	✔	✔

=== Episode 3 (30 June) ===
Order	Artist	Age	Song	Coaches and artists choices			
Order	Artist	Age	Song	Ricky	Jessie	Delta	Joel & Benji
1	Elysa Villareal	16	"Where Is the Love?"	—	—	—	—
2	Mikhail Laxton	25	"My Island Home"	✔	—	✔	✔
3	Keely Brittain	17	"A Thousand Years"	—	—	✔	✔
4	Darren Foster	N/A	"Hit the Road Jack"	—	—	—	—
5	Kimi Sami	N/A	"Dog Days Are Over"	—	—	—	—
6	Reggie Daguio	N/A	"Hold On, We're Going Home"	—	—	—	—
7	Josh Munroe	24	"Feeling Good"	—	—	—	—
8	Deanna Rose	30	"Video Games"	✔	—	✔	✔
9	Monty Cotton	28	"Folsom Prison Blues"	—	—	—	✔
10	Alana Patmore	17	"People Help the People"	—	—	—	—
11	Peta Evans-Taylor	28	"Sober"	✔	—	✔	✔

=== Episode 4 (5 July) ===
Order	Artist	Age	Song	Coaches and artists choices			
Order	Artist	Age	Song	Ricky	Jessie	Delta	Joel & Benji
1	Jason Howell	25	"Sexy and I Know It"	—	—	—	✔
2	Jo De Goldi	46	"Don't Rain on My Parade"	—	—	✔	✔
3	Tim McCallum	34	"Nessun Dorma"	✔	—	✔	✔
4	Damielou Shavelle	22	"Do It like a Dude"	—	—	—	—
5	Liam Maihi	23	"Budapest"	✔	✔	✔	✔
6	Aaleatha Sandstrom	28	"Rather Be"	—	—	—	—
7	Mark Stefanoff	23	"Burn for You"	✔	—	—	—
8	Laz Chester	30	"Counting Stars"	✔	✔	✔	—

=== Episode 5 (6 July) ===
Order	Artist	Age	Song	Coaches and artists choices			
Order	Artist	Age	Song	Ricky	Jessie	Delta	Joel & Benji
1	Stewart Winchester	24	"Lay Me Down"	✔	✔	✔	✔
2	Mys T	22	"Lips Are Movin"	—	—	—	—
3	Libby Moon	N/A	"It's Only a Paper Moon"	—	—	—	—
4	Albert Skipper	N/A	"Don't Stop Me Now"	—	—	—	—
5	Daniela Scala	N/A	"Pleasure and Pain"	—	—	—	—
6	Sam Rabbone	37	"All of Me"	—	—	—	—
7	Sarah Valentine	22	"Summertime Sadness"	✔	—	—	✔
8	Blake Galera-Holliss	27	"My Heart Will Go On"	—	—	—	—
9	Lizé Heerman	27	"My Baby Just Cares for Me"	✔	—	—	✔
10	Nathan Hawes	17	"Hold On, We're Going Home"	✔	✔	✔	✔
11	Grace Pitts	17	"Jolene"	—	—	✔	✔

=== Episode 6 (7 July) ===
Order	Artist	Age	Song	Coaches and artists choices			
Order	Artist	Age	Song	Ricky	Jessie	Delta	Joel & Benji
1	Joe Moore	24	"I See Fire"	✔	✔	✔	✔
2	Kayzee (Kelly & Zoe)	19 & 19	"Titanium"	—	—	—	—
3	Karim & Jasmin	20 & 20	"A Whole New World"	—	—	—	—
4	Geoff Jones	42	"Rebel Yell"	—	—	—	—
5	Fem Belling	36	"Bye Bye Blackbird"	✔	✔	✔	✔
6	Naomi Price	31	"Rolling in the Deep"	✔	—	—	✔
7	Ethan Conway	18	"Unaware"	—	✔	✔	—
8	Nina Baumer	17	"Something's Got a Hold on Me"	—	—	✔	✔

=== Episode 7 (12 July) ===
Order	Artist	Age	Song	Coaches and artists choices			
Order	Artist	Age	Song	Ricky	Jessie	Delta	Joel & Benji
1	Tamara O'Callaghan	28	"Diamonds Are a Girl's Best Friend"	—	—	—	—
2	Mahalate Teshome	18	"Broken-Hearted Girl"	—	✔	—	✔
3	Stephen McCulloch	39	"Father and Son"	—	—	✔	—
4	Hailey-Marie McFadden	26	"Wicked Games"	—	—	—	—
5	Jeremy Ryan	32	"Time to Say Goodbye"	✔	—	✔	—
6	Jake Howden	19	"Call Me Maybe"	—	—	✔	—
7	Tameaka Powell	29	"Landslide"	—	—	—	✔
8	Elizabeth Rimbo	22	"Joyful Joyful"	—	—	—	—

=== Episode 8 (13 July) ===
Order	Artist	Age	Song	Coaches and artists choices			
Order	Artist	Age	Song	Ricky	Jessie	Delta	Joel & Benji
1	James Sieff	18	"You've Got a Friend in Me"	—	—	✔	✔
2	Renee Pounsett	19	"Ghost"	—	—	✔	✔
3	Paul Crowder	49	"Say Something"	—	—	—	—
4	Adam Spain-Mostina	18	" Kiss Me"	✔	—	✔	—
5	Rene McGovern	40	"The Rose"	✔	—	—	—
6	Eleea Navarro	21	"Me and Bobby McGee"	—	—	—	—
7	Claudia Migliaccio	18	"How Come You Don't Call Me"	—	—	—	✔
8	Ellie Drennan	16	"Take It All"	—	✔	—	✔

=== Episode 9 (14 July) ===
Order	Artist	Age	Song	Coaches and artists choices			
Order	Artist	Age	Song	Ricky	Jessie	Delta	Joel & Benji
1	Simi Vuata	21	"Clown"	✔	✔	✔	—
2	Chantelle Morrell	26	"I Wanna Dance with Somebody"	—	—	—	✔
3	Mark Nivet	41	"Superstition"	—	—	—	Team Full
4	Dione Baker	25	"O Mio Babbino Caro"	✔	—	✔	Team Full
5	Bec Whitehead	23	"A-Tisket, A-Tasket"	Team Full	—	—	Team Full
6	Shyjana Terzioska	16	"Gravity"	Team Full	✔	—	Team Full
7	Esther Hermann	17	"Born to Try"	Team Full	Team Full	—	Team Full
8	Caleb Jago-Ward	21	"Somebody to Love"	Team Full	Team Full	✔	Team Full

== Battle rounds ==
Color key

– Contestant wins battle round/advances to the Super Battles
– Contestant loses battle round but gets saved/advances
– Contestant loses battle round and is eliminated

=== Episode 10 (19 July) ===
The first episode of the Battle Rounds was broadcast on 19 July 2015. The coaches performed a cover of "We Will Rock You" together at the start of the show.

Order	Coach	Winner	Song	Loser	'Steal' result			
Order	Coach	Winner	Song	Loser	Ricky	Jessie	Delta	Maddens
1	Jessie J	Ellie Drennan	"Elastic Heart"	Shyjana Terzioska	—	—N/a	—	—
2	The Maddens	Joe Moore	"Superheroes"	Monty Cotton	—	—	—	—N/a
3	Delta Goodrem	Rik-E-Ragga	"Beggin'"	Aviida	✔	—	—N/a	—
4	Ricky Martin	Gail Page	"Take Me to Church"	Deanna Rose	—N/a	—	—	—
5	Jessie J	Simi Vuata	"I'm Not the Only One"	Stewart Winchester	✔	—N/a	—	—
6	Delta Goodrem	Grace Pitts	"Blank Space"	Jake Howden	—N/a	—	—N/a	✔
7	Ricky Martin	Scott Newnham	"Love Runs Out"	Adam Spain-Mostina	—N/a	—	—	—
8	The Maddens	Sarah Valentine	"Shake It Out"	Amber Nichols	—N/a	✔	—	—N/a

=== Episode 11 (20 July) ===
The second episode of the Battle Rounds was broadcast on 20 July 2015.

Order	Coach	Winner	Song	Loser	'Steal' result			
Order	Coach	Winner	Song	Loser	Ricky	Jessie	Delta	Maddens
1	Jessie J	Cath Adams	"Mamma Knows Best"	Fem Belling	—N/a	—N/a	✔	—
2	Delta Goodrem	Lyndall Wennekes	"Pray to God"	Keely Brittain	—N/a	—	—N/a	—
3	Ricky Martin	Liam Maihi	"Crazy in Love"	Rene McGovern	—N/a	—	—	—
4	The Maddens	Peta Evans-Taylor	"Love Me Harder"	Claudia Migliaccio	—N/a	—	—	—N/a
5	Jessie J	Mahalate Teshome	"Style"	Paris Cassar	—N/a	—N/a	—	—
6	Delta Goodrem	Caleb Jago-Ward	"We Built This City"	Jo De Goldi	—N/a	—	—N/a	—
7	The Maddens	Nathan Hawes	"Stolen Dance"	Jason Howell	—N/a	✔	—	—N/a
8	Ricky Martin	Dione Baker	"Somewhere"	Jeremy Ryan	—N/a	—N/a	—	—

=== Episode 12 (21 July) ===
The third episode of the Battle Rounds was broadcast on 21 July 2015.

Order	Coach	Winner	Song	Loser	'Steal' result			
Order	Coach	Winner	Song	Loser	Ricky	Jessie	Delta	Maddens
1	Delta Goodrem	Stephen McCulloch	"Feels Like Home"	James Sieff	—N/a	—N/a	—N/a	—
2	Jessie J	Ethan Conway	"Bloodstream"	Laz Chester	—N/a	—N/a	—	—
3	Ricky Martin	Naomi Price	"Break Free"	Lizé Heerman	—N/a	—N/a	—	—
4	The Maddens	Tameaka Powell	"Hold Back The River"	Mikhail Laxton	—N/a	—N/a	✔	—
5	Jessie J	Chris Hoskin	"A Sky Full of Stars"	Ollie Kirk	—N/a	—N/a	—N/a	—
6	The Maddens	Renee Pounsett	"Waiting All Night"	Chantelle Morrell	—N/a	—N/a	—N/a	—N/a
7	Delta Goodrem	Nicolas Duquemin	"Empire"	Nina Baumer	—N/a	—N/a	—N/a	✔
8	Ricky Martin	Tim McCallum	"The Impossible Dream"	Mark Stefanoff	—N/a	—N/a	—N/a	—N/a

== Super Battle round ==
For the first time on The Voice, three singers from each team will go head to head in a super battle round. Each singer will sing a different song but only one will go through to the Live Shows. Prior to the Super Battles, each coach chose two of their artists to go straight through to the live shows via a fast pass.

Color key

– Contestant wins battle round/advances to the lives
– Contestant loses battle round and is eliminated

=== Episode 13 (26 July) ===
The Super Battle round was broadcast on 26 July 2015. 8 artists were given a "fast pass" while the remaining 24 competed for 8 spots.

Fast Passes

Coach	Contestant
The Maddens	Tameaka Powell
The Maddens	Nathan Hawes
Jessie J	Ellie Drennan
Jessie J	Simi Vuata
Delta Goodrem	Lyndall Wennekes
Delta Goodrem	Nicolas Duquemin
Ricky Martin	Liam Maihi
Ricky Martin	Gail Page

The Super Battles

Order	Coach	Winner	Song	Losers	
Order	Coach	Winner	Song	Singer	Song
1	The Maddens	Peta Evans-Taylor	"Take Me Home"	Jake Howden	"Home"
1	The Maddens	Peta Evans-Taylor	"Take Me Home"	Nina Baumer	"She Wolf (Falling To Pieces)"
2	Jessie J	Cath Adams	"Changing"	Jason Howell	"Bitter Sweet Symphony"
2	Jessie J	Cath Adams	"Changing"	Chris Hoskin	"Across The Universe"
3	Delta Goodrem	Caleb Jago-Ward	"We Are Young"	Fem Belling	"Stormy Monday"
3	Delta Goodrem	Caleb Jago-Ward	"We Are Young"	Stephen McCulloch	"Fire and Rain"
4	Ricky Martin	Scott Newnham	"Jealous"	Stewart Winchester	"Jealous"
4	Ricky Martin	Scott Newnham	"Jealous"	Aviida	"Jealous Guy"
5	The Maddens	Joe Moore	"Blame It on Me"	Renee Pounsett	"Everyone's Waiting"
5	The Maddens	Joe Moore	"Blame It on Me"	Sarah Valentine	"Love Me like You Do"
6	Jessie J	Amber Nichols	"You Ruin Me"	Mahalate Teshome	"Unfaithful"
6	Jessie J	Amber Nichols	"You Ruin Me"	Ethan Conway	"Do You Remember"
7	Delta Goodrem	Rik E Ragga	"Could You Be Loved"	Grace Pitts	"Boom Clap"
7	Delta Goodrem	Rik E Ragga	"Could You Be Loved"	Mikhail Laxton	"I Won't Let You Go"
8	Ricky Martin	Naomi Price	"Defying Gravity"	Dione Baker	"Climb Ev'ry Mountain"
8	Ricky Martin	Naomi Price	"Defying Gravity"	Tim McCallum	"You Raise Me Up"

== The Live Shows ==
=== Episode 14 (2 August) ===
The first episode of the Live shows will broadcast on 2 August 2015.

- Performance from Adam Lambert with his song "Ghost Town" from his studio album The Original High.

Order	Coach	Contestant	Song	Result
1	Jessie J	Ellie Drennan	"Team"	Saved by coach
2	Jessie J	Cath Adams	"Think"	Eliminated
3	Jessie J	Simi Vuata	"This Woman's Work"	Saved by public
4	Jessie J	Amber Nichols	"Teardrop"	Saved by public
5	Delta Goodrem	Rik-E-Ragga	"One More Night"	Saved by public
6	Delta Goodrem	Caleb Jago-Ward	"Start Again"	Saved by coach
7	Delta Goodrem	Nicolas Duquemin	"King"	Eliminated
8	Delta Goodrem	Lyndall Wennekes	"Candyman"	Saved by public
9	The Maddens	Joe Moore	"The Blower's Daughter"	Saved by public
10	The Maddens	Tameaka Powell	"Sin Wagon"	Eliminated
11	The Maddens	Peta Evans-Taylor	"Bring Me Some Water"	Saved by coach
12	The Maddens	Nathan Hawes	"Shake It Off"	Saved by public
13	Ricky Martin	Scott Newnham	"Cry Me a River"	Eliminated
14	Ricky Martin	Liam Maihi	"Let It Go"	Saved by public
15	Ricky Martin	Naomi Price	"Don't Cry for Me Argentina"	Saved by coach
16	Ricky Martin	Gail Page	"You Don't Own Me"	Saved by public

=== Episode 15 (9 August) ===
The second episode of the Live shows was broadcast on 9 August 2015. In addition to the songs performed live, digital versions of the songs that the eliminated contestants in the top 16 had performed were released, these being "Flame Trees" (Cath Adams), "Everybody's Free" (Nicolas Duquemin), "A Change Is Gonna Come" (Scott Newnham) and "What I Did for Love" (Tameaka Powell).

- Performance from Demi Lovato with her song Cool for the Summer.
- Performance from Delta Goodrem with her song Wings.

Order	Coach	Contestant	Song	Result
1	Jessie J	Simi Vuata	"Land of 1000 Dances"	Saved by coach
2	Jessie J	Amber Nichols	"Big Girls Cry"	Eliminated
3	Jessie J	Ellie Drennan	"Lean On"	Saved by public
4	Delta Goodrem	Caleb Jago-Ward	"Shut Up And Dance"	Saved by public
5	Delta Goodrem	Lyndall Wennekes	"Like I'm Gonna Lose You"	Saved by coach
6	Delta Goodrem	Rik-E-Ragga	"I Shot The Sheriff"	Eliminated
7	Ricky Martin	Naomi Price	"Too Darn Hot"	Saved by public
8	Ricky Martin	Liam Maihi	"Love Me Again"	Saved by coach
9	Ricky Martin	Gail Page	"Strange Fruit"	Eliminated
10	The Maddens	Nathan Hawes	"Only Love"	Saved by coach
11	The Maddens	Joe Moore	"Believe"	Saved by public
12	The Maddens	Peta Evans-Taylor	"All By Myself"	Eliminated

Group performances
Order	Performer	Song
1	Team Jessie J with Jessie J	"Flashlight"
2	Team Delta with Delta Goodrem	"Sitting on Top of the World"
3	Team Ricky with Ricky Martin	"Nobody Wants to Be Lonely"
4	Team Madden with Joel and Benji Madden	"Lifestyles of the Rich and Famous"

=== Episode 16 (16 August) ===
During this week, the contestants compete for a spot in the top 4 (one per team, selected by their coach) to go directly to the second round of voting in the semi-final. The bottom 4 will have to compete in a first round where two will be eliminated. Once again, digital versions of the songs that the eliminated Top 12 contestants had performed were released, these being: "What Kind of Man" (Peta Evans-Taylor), "Feeling Good" (Gail Page), "Seasons" (Rik-E-Ragga) and "The Power of Love" (Amber Nichols).

Order	Coach	Contestant	Song	Result
1	The Maddens	Nathan Hawes	"FourFiveSeconds"	Bottom four
2	The Maddens	Joe Moore	"Everybody Hurts"	Saved by coach
3	Ricky Martin	Liam Maihi	"Lonely Boy"	Saved by coach
4	Ricky Martin	Naomi Price	"Marry The Night"	Bottom four
5	Delta Goodrem	Caleb Jago-Ward	"I Believe In A Thing Called Love"	Bottom four
6	Delta Goodrem	Lyndall Wennekes	"Nobody Love"	Saved by coach
7	Jessie J	Ellie Drennan	"California Dreamin'"	Saved by coach
8	Jessie J	Simi Vuata	"We Don't Have To Take Our Clothes Off"	Bottom four

=== Episode 17 (23 August) ===
The Semi Finals was broadcast on 23 August 2015.

- Performance from all five judges singing The Beatles song "Let It Be".
- Performance from Jessie J singing her new single "Aint Been Done" with Benji Madden on guitar.
- With the elimination of Lyndall Wennekes, Delta Goodrem had no more contestants left on her team, making this season the first in the Australian version of the franchise where a coach did not have a contestant in the grand finale.

Order	Coach	Contestant	Song	Result
Sing off performances
1.1	Jessie J	Simi Vuata	"I Got You (I Feel Good)"	Eliminated
1.2	Ricky Martin	Naomi Price	"The Winner Takes It All"	Saved by public
1.3	Delta Goodrem	Caleb Jago-Ward	"Big Love"	Eliminated
1.4	The Maddens	Nathan Hawes	"Higher Love"	Saved by public
Top 6 performances
2.1	Delta Goodrem	Lyndall Wennekes	"Hold My Hand"	Eliminated
2.2	The Maddens	Nathan Hawes	"Fire and the Flood"	Instant Save
2.3	Jessie J	Ellie Drennan	"I Kissed A Girl"	Instant Save
2.4	Ricky Martin	Liam Maihi	"Never Tear Us Apart"	Instant Save
2.5	Ricky Martin	Naomi Price	"A House Is Not a Home"	Eliminated
2.6	The Maddens	Joe Moore	"Last Request"	Instant Save

=== Episode 18 (30 August) ===
The Grand Finale was broadcast on 30 August 2015

Key
Winner
Runner-up
Third place
Fourth place

Solo performances
Order	Coach	Contestant	Song	Result
1	Ricky Martin	Liam Maihi	"Fix You" by Coldplay	4th Place
2	The Maddens	Nathan Hawes	"Don't Think Twice, It's All Right" by Bob Dylan	3rd Place
3	The Maddens	Joe Moore	"Scars" by James Bay	Runner-up
6	The Maddens	Joe Moore	"Invincible" - Original Song	Runner-up
4	Jessie J	Ellie Drennan	"Nothing Compares 2 U" by Sinéad O'Connor	Winner
5	Jessie J	Ellie Drennan	"Ghost" - Original Song	Winner

Duet performances
Order	Duet Performers		Song
Order	Coach	Contestant	Song
1	Jessie J	Ellie Drennan	"Halo" by Beyoncé
2	Ricky Martin	Liam Maihi	"You're Nobody 'til Somebody Loves You" by James Arthur
3	Benji Madden	Nathan Hawes	"Wonderwall" by Oasis
4	Joel Madden	Joe Moore	"Demons" by Imagine Dragons

Group performances
Order	Performer	Song
1	Top 16	"My Heart Is Saying Good Night"

== Results summary ==
Color key

Winner
Runner-up
3rd place
4th place
Artist was chosen by the public to go through
Artist was chosen by the coach to go through
Artist was saved by Instant Save
Artist was sent to the lives
Artist won the Fast Pass to the lives
Artist moved to different team due to steal

=== Team Ricky ===
Artist	Battles	Super Battle	Live shows			Semi Final	Grand Finale
Artist	Battles	Super Battle	Week 1	Week 2	Week 3	Semi Final	Grand Finale
Liam Maihi	Advanced	Advanced	Advanced	Advanced	Advanced	Grand Finalist	4th Place
Naomi Price	Advanced	Advanced	Advanced	Advanced	Advanced	Eliminated (Semi Final)	
Gail Page	Advanced	Advanced	Advanced	Eliminated (Live show 3)			
Scott Newnham	Advanced	Advanced	Eliminated (Live show 2)				
Dione Baker	Advanced	Eliminated (Super Battle)					
Tim McCallum	Advanced	Eliminated (Super Battle)					
Aviida	Team Delta	Eliminated (Super Battle)					
Stewart Winchester	Team Jessie	Eliminated (Super Battle)					
Deanna Rose	Eliminated (Battles)						
Adam Spain-Mostina	Eliminated (Battles)						
Rene McGovern	Eliminated (Battles)						
Jeremy Ryan	Eliminated (Battles)						
Lizé Heerman	Eliminated (Battles)						
Mark Stefanoff	Eliminated (Battles)						

=== Team Jessie ===
Artist	Battles	Super Battle	Live shows			Semi Final	Grand Finale
Artist	Battles	Super Battle	Week 1	Week 2	Week 3	Semi Final	Grand Finale
Ellie Drennan	Advanced	Advanced	Advanced	Advanced	Advanced	Grand Finalist	Winner
Simi Vuata	Advanced	Advanced	Advanced	Advanced	Eliminated (Live Show 4)		
Amber Nichols	Team Madden	Advanced	Advanced	Eliminated (Live show 3)			
Cath Adams	Advanced	Advanced	Eliminated (Live show 2)				
Jason Howell	Team Madden	Eliminated (Super Battle)					
Chris Hoskin	Advanced	Eliminated (Super Battle)					
Ethan Conway.	Advanced	Eliminated (Super Battle)					
Mahalate Teshome	Advanced	Eliminated (Super Battle)					
Stewart Winchester	Advanced	Team Ricky					
Fem Belling	Advanced	Team Delta					
Shyjana Terzioska	Eliminated (Battles)						
Paris Cassar	Eliminated (Battles)						
Laz Chester	Eliminated (Battles)						
Ollie Kirk	Eliminated (Battles)						

=== Team Delta ===
Artist	Battles	Super Battle	Live shows			Semi Final	Grand Finale
Artist	Battles	Super Battle	Week 1	Week 2	Week 3	Semi Final	Grand Finale
Lyndall Wennekes	Advanced	Advanced	Advanced	Advanced	Advanced	Eliminated (Semi Final)	
Caleb Jago-Ward	Advanced	Advanced	Advanced	Advanced	Eliminated (Live show 4)		
Rik-E-Ragga	Advanced	Advanced	Advanced	Eliminated (Live show 3)			
Nicolas Duquemin	Advanced	Advanced	Eliminated (Live show 2)				
Grace Pitts	Advanced	Eliminated (Super Battle)					
Mikhail Laxton	Team Madden	Eliminated (Super Battle)					
Fem Belling	Team Jessie	Eliminated (Super Battle)					
Stephen McCulloch	Advanced	Eliminated (Super Battle)					
Aviida	Advanced	Team Ricky					
Jake Howden	Advanced	Team Madden					
Nina Baumer	Advanced	Team Madden					
Jo De Goldi	Eliminated (Battles)						
Keely Brittain	Eliminated (Battles)						
James Sieff	Eliminated (Battles)						

=== Team Madden ===
Artist	Battles	Super Battle	Live shows			Semi Final	Grand Finale
Artist	Battles	Super Battle	Week 1	Week 2	Week 3	Semi Final	Grand Finale
Joe Moore	Advanced	Advanced	Advanced	Advanced	Advanced	Grand Finalist	Runner-up
Nathan Hawes	Advanced	Advanced	Advanced	Advanced	Advanced	Grand Finalist	3rd Place
Peta Evans-Taylor	Advanced	Advanced	Advanced	Eliminated (Live show 3)			
Tameaka Powell	Advanced	Advanced	Eliminated (Live show 2)				
Jake Howden	Team Delta	Eliminated (Super Battle)					
Nina Baumer	Team Delta	Eliminated (Super Battle)					
Renee Pounsett	Advanced	Eliminated (Super Battle)					
Sarah Valentine	Advanced	Eliminated (Super Battle)					
Amber Nichols	Advanced	Team Jessie					
Jason Howell	Advanced	Team Jessie					
Mikhail Laxton	Advanced	Team Delta					
Monty Cotton	Eliminated (Battles)						
Claudia Migliaccio	Eliminated (Battles)						
Chantelle Morrell	Eliminated (Battles)						

== Elimination Chart ==
=== Overall ===
Artist's info

- Artist from Team Ricky
- Artist from Team Jessie
- Artist from Team Delta
- Artist from Team Madden

Result details

- Winner
- Runner-up
- Third place
- Fourth Place
- Saved by Instant Save (via App)
- Artist was saved by the public
- Artist was saved by his/her coach
- Artist was eliminated

Live show results per week
Artist	Week 1	Week 2	Week 3	Semi-Finals	Finals
Ellie Drennan	Safe	Safe	Safe	Safe	Winner
Joe Moore	Safe	Safe	Safe	Safe	Runner-up
Nathan Hawes	Safe	Safe	Safe	Safe	3rd Place
Liam Maihi	Safe	Safe	Safe	Safe	4th Place
Lyndall Wennekes	Safe	Safe	Safe	Eliminated	Eliminated (Semi-Finals)
Naomi Price	Safe	Safe	Safe	Eliminated	Eliminated (Semi-Finals)
Caleb Jago-Ward	Safe	Safe	Eliminated	Eliminated (Week 3)	
Simi Vuata	Safe	Safe	Eliminated	Eliminated (Week 3)	
Amber Nichols	Safe	Eliminated	Eliminated (Week 2)		
Gail Page	Safe	Eliminated	Eliminated (Week 2)		
Peta Evans-Taylor	Safe	Eliminated	Eliminated (Week 2)		
Rik-E-Ragga	Safe	Eliminated	Eliminated (Week 2)		
Cath Adams	Eliminated	Eliminated (Week 1)			
Nicolas Duquemin	Eliminated	Eliminated (Week 1)			
Scott Newnham	Eliminated	Eliminated (Week 1)			
Tameaka Powell	Eliminated	Eliminated (Week 1)			

=== Team ===
Artist's info

- Artist from Team Ricky
- Artist from Team Jessie
- Artist from Team Delta
- Artist from Team Madden

Result details

- Winner
- Runner-up
- Third place
- Fourth Place
- Artist was eliminated

Live show results per week
Artist	Live Shows				The Live Finale
Artist	Week 1	Week 2	Week 3	Week 4	The Live Finale
Liam Maihi	Advanced	Advanced	Advanced	Advanced	Fourth Place
Naomi Price	Advanced	Advanced	Advanced	Eliminated	
Gail Page	Advanced	Eliminated			
Scott Newnham	Eliminated				
Ellie Drennan	Advanced	Advanced	Advanced	Advanced	Winner
Simi Vuata	Advanced	Advanced	Eliminated		
Amber Nichols	Advanced	Eliminated			
Cath Adams	Eliminated				
Lyndall Wennekes	Advanced	Advanced	Advanced	Eliminated	
Caleb Jago-Ward	Advanced	Advanced	Eliminated		
Rik-E-Ragga	Advanced	Eliminated			
Nicolas Duquemin	Eliminated				
Joe Moore	Advanced	Advanced	Advanced	Advanced	Runner-up
Nathan Hawes	Advanced	Advanced	Advanced	Advanced	Third Place
Peta Evans-Taylor	Advanced	Eliminated			
Tameaka Powell	Eliminated				

== Ratings ==
The Voice season four consolidated viewership and adjusted position Colour key: – Highest rating during the season – Lowest rating during the season
Episode		Original airdate	Timeslot	Viewers (millions)	Night Rank	Source
1	"The Blind Auditions"	28 June 2015	Sunday 7:00 pm	1.633	#1	
2	"The Blind Auditions"	29 June 2015	Monday 7:30 pm	1.467	#1	
3	"The Blind Auditions"	30 June 2015	Tuesday 7:30 pm	1.383	#1	
4	"The Blind Auditions"	5 July 2015	Sunday 7:00 pm	1.675	#1	
5	"The Blind Auditions"	6 July 2015	Monday 7:30 pm	1.567	#1	
6	"The Blind Auditions"	7 July 2015	Tuesday 7:30 pm	1.538	#1	
7	"The Blind Auditions"	12 July 2015	Sunday 7:00 pm	1.899	#1	
8	"The Blind Auditions"	13 July 2015	Monday 7:30 pm	1.762	#1	
9	"The Blind Auditions"	14 July 2015	Tuesday 7:30 pm	1.679	#1	
10	"The Battle Rounds"	19 July 2015	Sunday 7:00 pm	1.656	#1	
11	"The Battle Rounds"	20 July 2015	Monday 7:30 pm	1.489	#1	
12	"The Battle Rounds"	21 July 2015	Tuesday 7:30 pm	1.549	#1	
13	"The Super Battle"	26 July 2015	Sunday 7:00 pm	1.554	#1	
14	"The Live Shows"	2 August 2015	Sunday 7:00 pm	1.555	#1	
15	"The Live Shows"	9 August 2015	Sunday 7:00 pm	1.479	#1	
16	"The Live Shows"	16 August 2015	Sunday 7:00 pm	1.466	#1	
17	"Semi Final"	23 August 2015	Sunday 7:00 pm	1.327	#1	
18	"Grand Finale"	30 August 2015	Sunday 7:00 pm	1.563	#2	
18	"Winner Announced"	30 August 2015	Sunday 7:00 pm	1.666	#1	
