= Ellie Drennan =

Australian pop singer-songwriter

- Born: Eloise Suzanne Drennan; 28 October 1998 (age 28); Central Coast, New South Wales, Australia
- Genre: Pop
- Occupations: Singer-songwriter; musician
- Instruments: Vocals; guitar
- Years active: 2015–present
- Label: Universal
- Website: ellie-drennan.com

Eloise Suzanne Drennan (born 28 October 1998) is an Australian pop singer-songwriter. She is the youngest winner of The Voice Australia, competing as a member of Team Jessie at the age of 16, in July–August 2015. She gained a large following from her YouTube covers.

Drennan listed her inspirations as Adele, Matt Corby, Katy Perry and Angus & Julia Stone. Her debut album Close Your Eyes was released on 11 September 2015 via Universal Music Australia, which reached No. 14 on the ARIA Albums Chart. Her winning track, "Ghost", became her debut single, which reached No. 25 on the ARIA Singles Chart. She followed this with "Hard Love", which peaked in the top 50. In 2019, Drennan returned to the music scene with her first independent release, a single titled "Taxi" released digitally.

== Early life ==
Drennan was born in 1998 in the Central Coast, New South Wales and went to St Josephs Catholic College, East Gosford.

== Career ==
=== 2015: The Voice ===
In 2015, Ellie Drennan, took part in season 4 of The Voice Australia, where she joined team Jessie J, after singing "Take It All" by Adele in the blind audition. She made it through the Grand Finale on 30 August, where she was announced winner. Her winner's single was "Ghost".

denotes winner. denotes a song that reached the top 10 on iTunes.

The Voice performances and results (2015)
Episode	Song	Original Artist	Result
Audition	"Take It All"	Adele	Through to Battle Rounds
Battle Rounds	"Elastic Heart"	Sia	Given a Fast Pass, through to the live shows
Live show 1	"Team"	Lorde	Saved by coach
Live show 2	"Lean On"	Major Lazer ft. DJ Snake & MØ	Saved by public
Live show 3	"California Dreamin'"	The Mamas & The Papas	Saved by coach
Semi Final	"I Kissed a Girl"	Katy Perry	Saved by public
Grand Finale	"Nothing Compares 2 U"	Sinéad O'Connor	Winner
Grand Finale	"Halo" (with Jessie J)	Beyoncé	Winner
Grand Finale	"Ghost" - Original Song	Drennan	Winner

== Discography ==
=== Studio albums ===
Title	Album details	Peak chart positions
Title	Album details	AUS
Close Your Eyes	Released: 11 September 2015; Label: Universal Music Australia; Formats: CD, digital download	14

=== Extended plays ===
List of EPs, with selected details
Title	Details
Ellie Drennan	Released: 9 February 2015; Label: Independent; Format: Digital download

=== Singles ===
Title	Year	Peak chart positions	Album
Title	Year	AUS	Album
"Ghost"	2015	25	Close Your Eyes
"Living Inside a Dream"	2016	—	Non-album singles
"Hard Love"	2016	41	Non-album singles
"Taxi"	2019	—	Non-album singles
"—" denotes releases that did not chart or were not released.

Preceded by Anja Nissen	The Voice winner 2015	Succeeded by Alfie Arcuri
