= Coterie (band) =

Australian-New Zealand band

Background information
- Origin: Perth, Western Australia
- Genres: Pacific reggae; pop; indie rock
- Years active: 2016–present
- Labels: Island Records Australia, Massive Records, Sony Music New Zealand
- Members: Tyler Fisher, Joshua Fisher, Brandford Fisher, Conrad Fisher

Coterie is a four-member Australian-New Zealand band. Formed from four brothers who were born in New Zealand and grew up in Perth, Western Australia, the band received recognition for the 2021 single "Cool It Down", which was a hit in New Zealand.

== Biography ==
The Fisher brothers' parents are musicians from New Zealand. While on tour, they decided to relocate the family from Papakura in Auckland to Perth, Western Australia. The family's roots are in Tauranga and Northland, and are of Te Aupōuri, Ngāpuhi and Ngāi Te Rangi descent.

The brothers formed as a musical act in 2016, and prior to this had worked on a number of different music projects, including Tastemakers, an online series where the brothers collaborated with Western Australian artists. The band released their first single "Where We Began" in 2019, and focused their early career on the local Perth music scene. The group released their first single under major label Island Records Australia in 2020, parting with the label in 2021 and releasing the single "Good Morning" independently. In late 2021 and 2022, Coterie toured Australia with New Zealand band Six60.

In 2022 the band had their first hit single in New Zealand with the song "Cool It Down", which was certified double platinum in New Zealand. The band released a Māori language version of the song, a week prior to Te Wiki o te Reo Māori.

On the 9th of December, 2022, the band released their first studio album, a self-titled 13-track release. The CD release features a bonus 14th track, the previously released Māori language version of "Cool It Down", titled "Purea".

== Discography ==
=== Studio albums ===
List of albums, with selected details
Title	Details	Peak chart positions		Certifications
Title	Details	NZ	AUS	Certifications
Coterie	Released: 9 December 2022; Format: CD, cassette, vinyl, digital download, streaming; Label: Massive Records	6	13	RMNZ: Gold
Orange Skies	Released: 27 November 2026; Format: CD, cassette, vinyl, digital download, streaming; Label: Massive Records	-	-	

=== Singles ===
Title	Year	Peak chart positions		Certifications	Album
Title	Year	NZ	NZ Artist	Certifications	Album
"Where We Began"	2019	—	—	RMNZ: Gold	Non-album singles
"Salvation"	2020	—	—		Non-album singles
"Say Goodbye"	2020	—	—		Non-album singles
"In the Fire"	2020	—	—		Non-album singles
"Bless My Soul"	2021	—	—		Non-album singles
"Good Morning"	2021	—	— (Note: "Good Morning" did not enter the NZ Artists Top 20 Singles Chart, but peaked at number 11 on the NZ Artists Hot Singles Chart.)		Non-album singles
"Cool It Down"	2021	30	2	RMNZ: 3× Platinum	Coterie
"Killing It Off"	2022	— (Note: "Killing It Off" did not enter the Official Top 40 Singles Chart, but peaked at number 13 on the Hot 40 Singles Chart.)	17	RMNZ: Platinum	Coterie
"West Coast Drive"	2022	— (Note: "West Coast Drive" did not enter the Official Top 40 Singles Chart, but peaked at number 16 on the Hot 40 Singles Chart.)	— (Note: "West Coast Drive" did not enter the NZ Artists Top 20 Singles Chart, but peaked at number 1 on the NZ Artists Hot Singles Chart.)		Coterie
"Deja Vu"	2022	— (Note: "Deja Vu" did not enter the Official Top 40 Singles Chart, but peaked at number 5 on the Hot 40 Singles Chart.)	17	RMNZ: Gold	Coterie
"Shame"	2022	—	— (Note: "Shame" did not enter the New Zealand artists top 20 Singles Chart, but peaked at number 20 on the Hot 20 New Zealand artists Singles Chart.)		Coterie
"Always Beside You" (featuring Six60)	2022	— (Note: "Always Beside You" did not enter the Official Top 40 Singles Chart, but peaked at number 5 on the Hot 40 Singles Chart.)	4	RMNZ: Platinum	Coterie
"Slice of Heaven" (featuring Dave Dobbyn)	2023	— (Note: "Slice of Heaven" did not enter the Official Top 40 Singles Chart, but peaked at number 9 on the Hot 40 Singles Chart.)	4	RMNZ: Gold	Non-album singles
"Paradise"	2023	— (Note: "Paradise" did not enter the Official Top 40 Singles Chart, but peaked at number 5 on the Hot 40 Singles Chart.)	17	RMNZ: Gold	Non-album singles
"One More Chance" (featuring Savage)	2024	— (Note: "One More Chance" did not enter the Official Top 40 Singles Chart, but peaked at number 12 on the Hot 40 Singles Chart.)	15		Non-album singles
"What We're Living For" (NRL Anthem)	2025	—	—		Non-album singles
"Pretty Gyal"	2025	— (Note: "Pretty Gyal" did not enter the Official Top 40 Singles Chart, but peaked at number 5 on the Hot 40 Singles Chart.)	—		Orange Skies
"Lay Your Head"	2026	— (Note: "Lay Your Head" did not enter the NZ Top 40 Singles Chart, but peaked at number 8 on the NZ Hot Singles Chart.)	—		Orange Skies
"All Day"	2026	— (Note: "All Day" did not enter the NZ Top 40 Singles Chart, but peaked at number 22 on the NZ Hot 40 Singles Chart.)	—		Orange Skies
"Marmalade Magic"	2026	— (Note: "Marmalade Magic" did not enter the NZ Top 40 Singles Chart, but peaked at number 24 on the NZ Hot 40 Singles Chart.)	—		Orange Skies
"—" denotes a recording that did not chart.

==== Promotional singles ====
Title	Year	Peak chart positions		Album
Title	Year	NZ Hot	NZ Artist	Album
"Purea / Cool It Down"	2022	9	18	Non-album single

==== Other charted songs ====
Title	Year	Peak chart positions		Album
Title	Year	NZ Hot	NZ Artist Hot	Album
"Shakin' Her Body"	2022	—	11	Coterie
"For the People"	2022	—	12	Coterie
"Honey Dance with Me"	2023	21	3	Coterie

== Awards and nominations ==
=== APRA Music Awards ===
The APRA Music Awards were established by Australasian Performing Right Association (APRA) in 1982 to honour the achievements of songwriters and music composers, and to recognise their song writing skills, sales and airplay performance, by its members annually.

Year	Nominee / work	Award	Result	Ref.
2025	"Paradise"	Most Performed Alternative Work	Won	
