= Killing It Off =

2022 single by Coterie

Single by Coterie

from the album Coterie
- Released: 29 April 2022
- Genre: pop; reggae; dub
- Length: 2:50
- Label: Massive Records
- Songwriter(s): Antoni Fisher; Brandford Fisher; Conrad Fisher; Joshua Fisher; Tyler Fisher
- Producer(s): Coterie; Robby De Sá

Coterie singles chronology
"Cool It Down" (2021)	"Killing It Off" (2022)	"West Coast Drive" (2022)

Music video
- "Killing It Off" on YouTube

"Killing It Off" is a song by Australian-New Zealand band Coterie, released as a single in April 2022.

== Background and composition ==
The song was written to express dealing with temptations in everyday life.

== Release ==
"Killing It Off" was released as a single in April 2022, after the success of "Cool It Down" in New Zealand at the end of their Australian tour with Six60. The track had already been debuted during the band in live performances.

== Critical reception ==
Reviewers from Surg likened the song to Australian acts Lime Cordiale and Ocean Alley, describing the track as "ooz[ing] summer vibes" and "transport[ing] you to a beachy setting". Christine Lai of Surg praised the song's vocal arrangements, "dazzling electric guitar licks and driving drum beats".

== Credits and personnel ==
- Coterie – performer, producer
- Robby De Sá – producer, engineer, mixing engineer
- Antoni Fisher – songwriter, engineer
- Brandford Fisher – songwriter
- Conrad Fisher – songwriter
- Joshua Fisher – songwriter
- Tyler Fisher – songwriter
- Liam Quinn – mastering engineer

== Charts ==
Chart (2022)	Peak position
New Zealand Hot Singles (Recorded Music NZ)	13
New Zealand Artist Singles (Recorded Music NZ)	17

== Certifications ==
Region	Certification	Certified units/sales
New Zealand (RMNZ)	Gold	15,000^{‡}
^{‡} Sales+streaming figures based on certification alone.
