= Soul Mystique =

Soul Mystique is an Australian duo of entertainers who became known in world variety theatre for their performances combining professional dancesport with a high speed quick change act. This duo is most famous for their two appearances on the television show Australia's Got Talent in 2007 (series 1) and 2012 (series 6) – both times with great success as Grand Finalists, and placing 2nd runner up in series 6.

In 2008 Soul Mystique was placed amongst 10 of the world's best magicians by Fox Bio Channel – and was invited by Las Vegas veterans and legends of Magic, Siegfried and Roy, as the closing act at for the historic event ‘A Tribute to Siegfried & Roy at The London Palladium’ - where Queen Elizabeth and members of the Royal Family were in attendance.

In 2011, Soul Mystique was listed as the choice of entertainment for high society by Asian Tatler Magazine. The duo was also twice ‘Australian Entertainer of the Year’ Finalists in 2011 and 2012 by Australian Event Awards.

Soul Mystique is a partnership formed in 1996, between two former Latin-American dancesport champions, Gavin Skinner and Lydia Lim. This duo produces every aspect of their shows from costuming and props to musical arrangements. Soul Mystique produced 3 world records in 2012 which were performed on Australia's Got Talent (series 6), including being the first in the world to perform a series of high speed changes of boots and shoes, consecutive costume changes while seated, and the fastest 2 second male and female costume change performed simultaneously under a wall of confetti. Soul Mystique has been a registered trademark since 2009.
