= Australia's Got Talent season 6 =

Australia's Got Talent
- Season 6
- Hosted by: Grant Denyer
- Judges: Brian McFadden; Dannii Minogue; Kyle Sandilands; Todd McKenney (Melbourne auditions & Finals showdown 2)
- Winner: Andrew De Silva
- Runner-up: The Wolfe Brothers

Release
- Original network: Seven Network
- Original release: 16 April – 25 July 2012

Season chronology
- ← Previous; Season 5 Next → Season 7

Australia's Got Talent is an Australian reality television show, based on the original UK series, to find new talent. The sixth season aired on the Seven Network from 16 April 2012 until 25 July 2012. Dannii Minogue, Brian McFadden and Kyle Sandilands returned as judges, as well as Grant Denyer as host. The auditions took place from October–December 2011, and the filming of the show took place from February–March 2012. Todd McKenney was a guest judge at the Melbourne auditions, in the absence of Sandilands, and the second show of the finals showdown, in the absence of McFadden. This was Minogue and McFadden's final series as judges, as they were replaced by Dawn French, Geri Halliwell and season 5 contestant Timomatic in season 7.

== Auditions ==
There are various options for auditioning, such as attending the correct venue on the correct day with the questionnaire (which can be found on the website or completed on audition day), sending a DVD in with the act on it, or applying online. The following list contains all of the cities, venues and dates of the auditions. Todd McKenney was a guest judge at the Melbourne auditions in the place of Kyle Sandilands.

Audition City	Date	Venue
Adelaide, South Australia	8 October 2011	Ridley Centre, Adelaide Showgrounds
Coffs Harbour, New South Wales	13 October 2011	Shearwater Room, Opal Cove Resort
Newcastle, New South Wales	15 October 2011	Mulunbinba Room, Newcastle City Hall
Tamworth, New South Wales	19 October 2011	Tamworth Regional Entertainment and Conference Centre
Sydney, New South Wales	22–23 October 2011	Southee Complex, Sydney Showground
Mildura, Victoria	27 October 2011	The Setts, Banksia Room
Melbourne, Victoria	29–30 October 2011	Market Place, Moonee Valley Race Club
Perth, Western Australia	6 November 2011	Perth Convention and Exhibition Centre
Bunbury, Western Australia	8 November 2011	Quality Hotel Lord Forest, Barons Function Centre
Launceston, Tasmania	12 November 2011	Chancellor Ballroom, Hotel Grand Chancellor
Hobart, Tasmania	13 November 2011	Gretel Room, Hobart Function & Conference Centre
Albury, New South Wales	15 November 2011	Albury Entertainment Centre
Brisbane, Queensland	19–20 November 2011	Brisbane Convention & Exhibition Centre
Cairns, Queensland	22 November 2011	Events Centre, Shangri-La Hotel, The Marina
Dubbo, New South Wales	27 November 2011	Dubbo RSL Club Resort
Darwin, Northern Territory	3 December 2011	Ambassador Room, Crowne Plaza

== Semi-finalists ==
Key	Winner	Runner up	Finalist	Grand Finalist	Semi-Finalist (lost judges' vote)

Name	Genre	Act	Age(s)	From	Semi	Position reached
Andrew De Silva	Music	Singer	37	Melbourne; Sri Lanka (native)	2	Winner
Andy Holm	Music	Musician	54	Byron Bay	8	Semi-finalist
Anthony Laye	Magic	Mentalist	34	Sydney	8	Semi-Finalist
Beside Lights	Music	Band	21-22	Perth	2	Finalist
Black Diamonds	Dancing	Dance Group	15–50	Adelaide	8	Semi-Finalist
Boris Jalovec	Singing	Opera Singer	43	Boolarra, NSW	6	Semi-Finalist
Caleb Bartolo	Dancing	Dancer	19	Melbourne	5	Semi-Finalist
Circotic	Performing	Gymnastics Group	19–27	Melbourne	7	Semi-Finalist
Cody Bell	Singing	Singer	18	Melbourne	1	Semi-finalist
Darren Jones	Singing	Singer	50	Adelaide	2	Semi-finalist
Divalicious	Singing	Opera Duo	43 & 41	Western Australia	4	Semi-finalist
Divine Knights	Singing	Singing Duo	32 & 33	Sydney	4	Semi-finalist
Dylan Yeandle	Performing	Stripper	25	Launceston	7	Grand Finalist
Ev and Bow	Dancing	Dance Group	17-26	Sydney	2	Semi-finalist
Flair Riders	Performing	Stunt Motorcycle Team	21–24	Byron Bay	5	Semi-Finalist
Flowers For Midnight	Music	Band	17-39	Brisbane	7	Finalist
Genesis	Music	Beatboxer	19	Sydney	6	Grand Finalist
George & Noriko	Music	Musicians	33 & 37	Melbourne	4	Finalist
Hansel	Singing	Rock Band	22–35	Newcastle	3	Semi-finalist
Jagger	Music	Drummer	9	Sydney	1	Finalist
Jeremy Yong	Music	Singer	7	Sydney	5	Semi-finalist
Joe Fisher	Performing	Juggler	14	Tasmania	3	Semi-finalist
Joe Moore	Music	Singer	21	Sydney	5	Grand Finalist
Jonny Taylor	Music	Singer	26	Perth	7	Semi-Finalist
Justin Geange	Singing	Singer	39	Brisbane	7	Semi-finalist
Kookies N Kream	Dancing	Dance Group	14-18	Sydney	8	Grand Finalist
Larger Than Life	Music	Band	9-14	Sydney	4	Semi-finalist
Laura Loe	Singing	Singer	24	Melbourne	1	Semi-finalist
Laydee Kinmee	Singing	Drag Singer	27	Sydney	5	Semi-Finalist
Luke Heggie	Comedy	Comedian	37	Sydney	4	Semi-finalist
Mark Lowndes	Music	Singer	28	Brisbane	6	Finalist
Mint26	Singing	A Cappella Group	28–33	Melbourne	7	Semi-finalist
Monique Le Bas	Singing	Opera Singer	29	Minyip, Victoria	8	Semi-finalist
Nat Harris	Performing	Aerialist	32	Sydney	1	Semi-finalist
Natasha Hoeberigs	Singing	Singer	19	Sydney	3	Semi-finalist
Odyssey	Performing	Gymnastics Group	11-35	Brisbane	3	Grand Finalist
Outside the Box	Performing	Gymnastics Group		Penrith	4	Semi-finalist
Owen Campbell	Music	Singer	28	Canberra	3	Finalist
Phly Crew	Dancing	Dance Duo	21 & 22	Sydney	7	Semi Finalist
Phuzion	Singing	Singing Duo	17	Canberra	5	Semi-Finalist
Pip	Magic	Illusionist	25	Sydney	1	Semi-finalist
Rhys Tohlhurst	Singing	Singer	17	Cairns	4	Finalist
Runway	Dancing	Dance Group	16-22	Brisbane	3	Semi-finalist
Sam McCool	Comedy	Comedian	35	Sydney	1	Semi-finalist
Soul Mystique	Magic	Quick Change Duo	35 & 40	Brisbane	5	Grand Finalist
Superhoodz	Dance	Dance Group	15–22	Melbourne	1	Semi-finalist
Suzie Q & Toby J	Performing	Aerial Duo	28 & 36	Gold Coast	6	Semi-finalist
Ten Days After Christmas	Singing	Singing Duo	8 & 10	Tasmania	8	Semi-finalist
The Divine Divas of Sunbury	Music	Choir	11–71	Sunbury, VIC	2	Semi-finalist
The Nelson Twins	Comedy	Comedians	29	Walbundrie, NSW	8	Finalist
The Pigs	Music	Bluegrass Band	29–49	Tasmania	6	Semi-finalist
The Space Cowboy	Performing	Sideshow Act	33	Byron Bay	2	Semi-finalist
The Wolfe Brothers	Music	Band	22-26	Hobart	1	Runner-up
Tiny Tina	Singing	Singer	38	Sydney	2	Semi-finalist
Trinity Tiger Tones	Singing	A Cappella Group	19–23	Melbourne	6	Semi-finalist
Zigitty	Dancing	Dance Group	9-13	Sydney	3	Semi-finalist
Zoo Allstars	Dancing	Cheerleading Group	15–30	Brisbane	6	Semi-finalist

== Semi-final summary ==
The "Order" columns lists the order of appearance each act made for every episode.

Key	Buzzed	Judges' choice	Won the judges' vote	Won the public vote

=== Semi-final 1 ===
Order	Semi-Finalist	Buzzes and Judges' votes			Result
Order	Semi-Finalist	Kyle	Dannii	Brian	Result
1	Jagger				Won judges vote
2	Cody Bell				Eliminated
3	Superhoodz				Eliminated
4	Nat Harris				Eliminated
5	Pip				Eliminated
6	The Wolfe Brothers				Won public vote
7	Sam McCool				Eliminated
8	Laura Loe				Lost judges vote

=== Semi-final 2 ===
Order	Semi-Finalist	Buzzes and Judges' votes			Result
Order	Semi-Finalist	Kyle	Dannii	Brian	Result
1	Tiny Tina				Eliminated
2	The Divine Divas of Sunbury				Eliminated
3	The Space Cowboy				Eliminated
4	Beside Lights				Won judges vote
5	Darren Jones				Eliminated
6	Ev and Bow				Lost judges vote
7	Andrew De Silva				Won public vote

=== Semi-final 3 ===
Order	Semi-Finalist	Buzzes and Judges' votes			Result
Order	Semi-Finalist	Kyle	Dannii	Brian	Result
1	Zigitty				Eliminated
2	Natasha Hoeberigs				Eliminated
3	Hansel				Eliminated
4	Runway				Lost judges vote
5	Joe Fisher				Eliminated
6	Odyssey				Won public vote
7	Owen Campbell				Won judges vote

=== Semi-final 4 ===
Order	Semi-Finalist	Buzzes and Judges' votes			Result
Order	Semi-Finalist	Kyle	Dannii	Brian	Result
1	Divine Knights				Eliminated
2	Larger Than Life				Eliminated
3	Outside The Box				Eliminated
4	George and Noriko				Won public vote
5	Luke Heggie				Eliminated
6	Divalicious				Lost Judges Vote
7	Rhys Tolhurst				Won Judges Vote

=== Semi-final 5 ===
Order	Semi-Finalist	Buzzes and Judges' votes			Result
Order	Semi-Finalist	Kyle	Dannii	Brian	Result
1	Jeremy Yong				Lost Judges Vote
2	Flair Riders ^{1}				Eliminated
3	Laydee Kinmee				Eliminated
4	Phuzion				Eliminated
5	Caleb Bartolo				Eliminated
6	Joe Moore				Won Judges Vote
7	Soul Mystique				Won public vote

Notes

- ^{1} Flair Riders performed outside the studio due to safety concerns. The judges did not have buzzers in the studio instead having "X" signs, no judges used them however.

=== Semi-final 6 ===
Order	Semi-Finalist	Buzzes and Judges' votes			Result
Order	Semi-Finalist	Kyle	Dannii	Brian	Result
1	Suzie Q & Toby J				Eliminated
2	Boris Jalovec				Eliminated
3	Trinity Tiger Tones				Eliminated
4	Genesis				Won Judges Vote
5	Zoo Allstars				Eliminated
6	The Pigs				Lost Judges Vote
7	Mark Lowndes				Won public vote

=== Semi-final 7 ===
Order	Semi-Finalist	Buzzes and Judges' votes			Result
Order	Semi-Finalist	Kyle	Dannii	Brian	Result
1	Phly Crew				Eliminated
2	Jonny Taylor				Lost Judges Vote
3	Circotic				Eliminated
4	Justin Geange				Eliminated
5	Mint26				Eliminated
6	Dylan Yeandle				Won Judges Vote
7	Flowers For Midnight				Won public vote

=== Semi-final 8 ===
Order	Semi-Finalist	Buzzes and Judges' votes			Result
Order	Semi-Finalist	Kyle	Dannii	Brian	Result
1	Black Diamonds Drilldance Team				Eliminated
2	Andy Holm				Eliminated
3	Monique Le Bas				Eliminated
4	Ten Days After Christmas				Eliminated
5	The Nelson Twins				Won Judges Vote
6	Anthony Laye				Lost Judges Vote
7	Kookies N Kream				Won Public Vote

== Finals summary ==
The "Order" columns lists the order of appearance each act made for every episode.

Key	Won the judges' vote	Won the public vote

=== Final showdown 1 ===
Order	Contestant	Finished
1	Mark Lowndes	Eliminated
2	Genesis	Won Judges Vote
3	Owen Campbell	Top 5 - Eliminated
4	Jagger	Eliminated
5	Dylan Yeandle	Won Judges Vote
6	Joe Moore	Won public vote
7	Odyssey	Won public vote
8	Beside Lights	Eliminated

=== Final showdown 2 ===
Order	Contestant	Finished
1	Flowers For Midnight	Eliminated
2	George & Noriko	Top 5 - Eliminated
3	The Nelson Twins	Eliminated
4	The Wolfe Brothers	Won public vote
5	Soul Mystique	Won Judges Vote
6	Rhys Tohlhurst	Eliminated
7	Kookies N Kream	Won Judges Vote
8	Andrew De Silva	Won public vote

Notes

- McKenney replaced McFadden during his absence.

=== Grand Final ===
Key	Winner	Runner-up

Order	Contestant	Finished
1	Genesis	8th Place
2	The Wolfe Brothers	Runner Up
3	Dylan Yeandle	7th Place
4	Joe Moore	4th Place
5	Soul Mystique	3rd Place
6	Kookies N Kream	6th Place
7	Andrew De Silva	Winner
8	Odyssey	5th Place

== Ratings ==
Colour key:
– Highest rating episode and week during the series
– Lowest rating episode and week during the series

Episode		Original airdate	Viewers (millions)	Night Rank	Source
1	"Auditions"	16 April 2012	1.196	6	
2	"Auditions"	17 April 2012	0.980	9	
3	"Auditions"	18 April 2012	1.392	1	
4	"Auditions"	23 April 2012	1.227	6	
5	"Auditions"	24 April 2012	1.033	10	
6	"Auditions"	25 April 2012	1.537	1	
7	"Auditions"	30 April 2012	0.966	10	
8	"Auditions"	1 May 2012	1.073	7	
9	"Auditions"	2 May 2012	1.301	3	
10	"Semi-Finals"	9 May 2012	1.165	3	
11	"Semi-Finals"	16 May 2012	1.072	5	
12	"Semi-Finals"	23 May 2012	0.547	19	
13	"Semi-Finals"	30 May 2012	1.026	7	
14	"Semi-Finals"	6 June 2012	1.001	8	
15	"Semi-Finals"	14 June 2012	0.534	19	
16	"Semi-Finals"	20 June 2012	0.881	11	
17	"Semi-Finals"	27 June 2012	0.901	9	
18	"Finals"	4 July 2012	0.805	13	
19	"Finals"	11 July 2012	0.918	10	
20	"Grand Finale"	18 July 2012	1.109	4	
21	"Winner Announced"	25 July 2012	0.998	7	
