= Reset (Tina Arena album) =

Studio album by Tina Arena
- Released: 18 October 2013
- Genre: Pop
- Length: 58:21
- Label: EMI

Tina Arena chronology
Symphony of Life (2012)	Reset (2013)	Eleven (2015)

Singles from Reset
- 1. "You Set Fire to My Life" Released: 26 September 2013; 2. "Reset All" Released: 18 December 2013; 3. "Still Running" Released: 15 August 2014

Reset is the tenth studio album released by Australian singer and songwriter Tina Arena on 18 October 2013. The first single, "You Set Fire to My Life" was released on 26 September 2013. Despite not being released as a single, "Only Lonely" charted in the top 50 in late November due to being used in an advertisement for the Australian soap opera Home and Away. "Reset All" was released as the second official single on 18 December. Reset is Arena's sixth top 10 album in Australia. Reset was released in the United Kingdom on 3 November 2014.

== Singles ==
"You Set Fire to My Life" was released at the first single in September 2013 and peaked at 38. "Reset All" was released as the second single. "Love You Less" was announced as the third single in March 2014, but did not eventuate. "Still Running" was released as the third single in August 2014. The video clip was filmed in Rome and released in July.

In addition to the official singles, "Only Lonely" charted at 32 and gained national interest after it was used in a commercial for the 2013 finale of Channel 7's Home and Away as well as at the 2014 Logie Awards.

On 19 February 2014, Arena released remixes of "Don't Hide", which were used in promotion of the 2014 Sydney Mardi Gras.

== Track listing ==
Standard edition
No.	Title	Writer(s)	Producer(s)	Length
1.	"Love You Less"	Tina Arena, Stuart Crichton, Ilan Kidron	David Schuler	3:40
2.	"Still Running"	Tina Arena, Hayley Warner, Louis Schoorl	Danton Supple	3:26
3.	"You Set Fire to My Life"	Tina Arena, Mattias Lindblom, Anders Wollbeck	David Schuler	4:14
4.	"Let Me In"	Tina Arena, Robert Conley, Hunter Nixon	Tina Arena, Robert Conley	3:23
5.	"Out of the Blue"	Tina Arena, Mattias Lindblom, Anders Wollbeck	Vacuum	4:08
6.	"Don't Hide"	Tina Arena, Arnthor Birgisson, Lukasz Duchnowski, Tiaan Williams	Arnthor Birgisson	4:06
7.	"Patchwork Heart"	Tina Arena, Robert Conley, Alex Hope	Tina Arena, Robert Conley	3:55
8.	"It's Just What It Is"	Tina Arena, Greg Fitzgerald	Tina Arena, Robert Conley	3:54
9.	"Don't Look Back"	Tina Arena, Robert Conley, Alex Hope	Tina Arena, Robert Conley	4:06
10.	"Bring Me Love"	Tina Arena, Andy Macken, Thom Macken	Dann Hume	3:56
11.	"Only Lonely"	Tina Arena, Alex Hope, Roberto De Sa	Roberto De Sa	3:22
12.	"Destination Unknown"	Tina Arena, Paul Statham	Tina Arena, Robert Conley	3:58
13.	"Reset All"	Tina Arena, Hunter Nixon, Lindsay Rimes	Danton Supple	3:46

Deluxe edition bonus tracks
No.	Title	Writer(s)	Producer(s)	Length
14.	"I Can Breathe"	Tina Arena, Anthony Egizii, David Musumeci	Robert Conley	3:35
15.	"Lose Myself"	Tina Arena, Robert Conley, Roberto De Sa, Alex Hope	David Schuler	3:50
16.	"You Set Fire to My Life" (acoustic)	Tina Arena, Mattias Lindblom, Anders Wollbeck	Scott Horscroft	4:22

== Charts ==
=== Weekly charts ===
Weekly chart performance for Reset
Chart (2013)	Peak position
Australian Albums (ARIA)	4

=== Year-end charts ===
Year-end chart performance for Reset
Chart (2013)	Position
Australian Albums (ARIA)	39

== Certifications ==
Certifications for Reset
Region	Certification	Certified units/sales
Australia (ARIA)	Platinum	70,000^{^}
^{^} Shipments figures based on certification alone.

== Tour ==
Reset Tour
- Tour by Tina Arena
- Promotional poster for the tour
- Associated album: Reset
- Start date: 8 August 2014
- End date: 9 October 2014
- Legs: 1
- No. of shows: 18 in Australia

Tina Arena concert chronology
- Symphony of Life Tour (2012); Reset Tour (2014); One Night Only (2016)

On 9 March 2014, Arena announced the 13-date Reset All Tour. 6 shows were added, and the Hobart show was removed, taking the total to 18. The support act was George Perris.

Date	Location	Venue
8 August 2014	Darwin	Darwin Festival
9 August 2014	Darwin	Darwin Festival
15 August 2014	Perth	Burwood Theatre
18 August 2014	Adelaide	Thebarton Theatre
23 August 2014	Gold Coast	Jupiters Theatre
24 August 2014	Brisbane	Brisbane Convention Centre
29 August 2014	Cairns	Cairns Convention Centre
30 August 2014	Townsville	Townsville Entertainment Centre
5 September 2014	Tamworth	Tamworth Regional Entertainment Centre
6 September 2014	Canberra	Llewellyn Hall
7 September 2014	Newcastle	Civic Theatre
11 September 2014	Sydney	The Star Event Centre
12 September 2014	Sydney	The Star Event Centre
13 September 2014	Wollongong	WIN Entertainment Centre
17 September 2014	Melbourne	Palais Theatre
18 September 2014	Melbourne	Palais Theatre
5 October 2014	Caloundra	Caloundra Music Festival
9 October 2014	Ballarat	Her Majesty's Theatre
5 November 2014	London, UK	Church of St John-at-Hackney

=== Set list ===
This set list consists of 18 songs and is representative of the 1st show in Adelaide. It does not represent all concerts for the duration of the tour.

1. "Let Me In"
2. "Out of the Blue"
3. "Soul Mate #9"
4. "Dare You to Be Happy"
5. "Sorrento Moon (I Remember)"
6. "Still Running"
7. "Don't Look Back"
8. "Destination Unknown"
9. "Only Lonely"
10. "Reset All"
11. "Don't Hide"
12. "Never (Past Tense)"
13. "Burn"
14. "Symphony of Life"
15. "Heaven Help My Heart"

Encore

16. "Chains"
17. "I Need Your Body"
18. "You Set Fire To My Life"
