= Joe Moore (musician) =

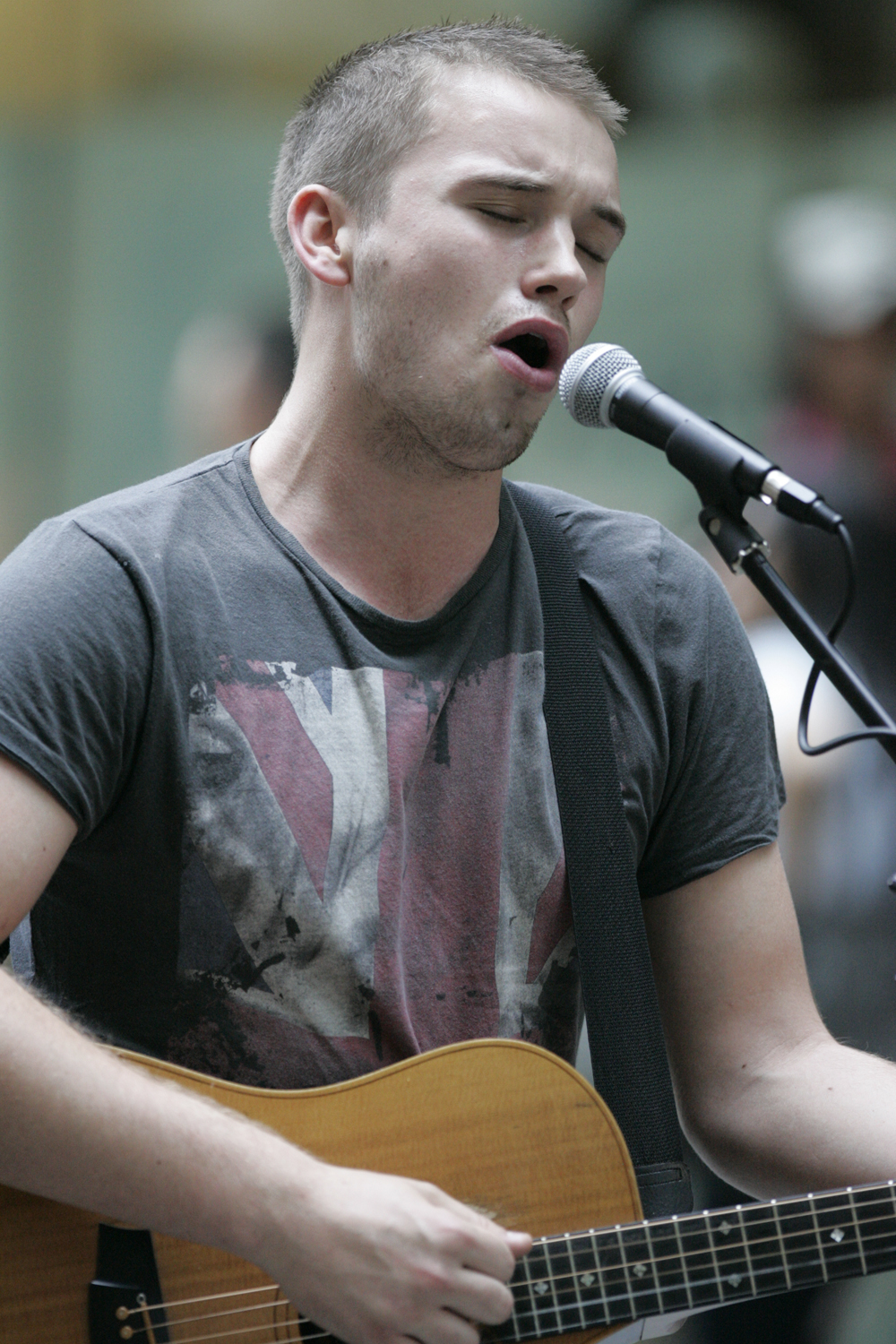
- Moore in 2012

Background information
- Born: 27 January 1991 (age 34); England
- Origin: Sydney, New South Wales, Australia
- Genres: Pop, rock
- Occupation: Singer-songwriter
- Instrument: Guitar
- Years active: 2012–present
- Labels: Joe Moore Music / Universal Music Australia
- Website: http://joemoore.com.au

Joe Moore (born 27 January 1991) is an English-born Australian singer-songwriter from Sydney. He moved to Australia with his family in 2007 when he was 16. He is currently managed by Glenn Wheatley and signed to Universal Music Australia.

== Career ==
=== 2012–2015: Australia's Got Talent and The Voice ===
In 2012, Moore auditioned for series six of Australia's Got Talent. It was announced that he came fourth in the finale on 25 July 2012.

After Australia's Got Talent, Moore continued busking in Sydney's Pitt Street Mall, which he had begun doing in 2008, and writing his own material. He shared the stage with John Farnham, Boyz II Men, and Lionel Richie.

In 2015, Moore auditioned for the fourth series of The Voice Australia with a cover of "I See Fire" and joined The Madden Brothers' team. He was announced runner-up to Ellie Drennan in the finale on 30 August. The following week, his independently released single "Symphony" made its ARIA Charts debut at number 52 for the week commencing 7 September 2015.

The Voice performances and results (2015)
Episode	Song	Original Artist	Result
Audition	"I See Fire"	Ed Sheeran	Through to Battle rounds
Battle Rounds	"Superheroes"	The Script	Through to The Super Battle
Super Battle Rounds	"Blame It on Me"	George Ezra	Through to live shows
Live show 1	"The Blower's Daughter"	Damien Rice	Saved by Coach
Live show 2	"Believe"	Mumford & Sons	Saved by Public
Live show 3	"Everybody Hurts"	R.E.M.	Saved by Coach
Semi Final	"Last Request"	Paolo Nutini	Instant Save
Grand Final	"Scars"	James Bay	Runner Up
Grand Final	"Demons" with Joel Madden	Imagine Dragons	Runner Up
Grand Final	"Invincible" – original song	Moore	Runner Up

=== 2015: After The Voice and A Thousand Lifetimes ===
On 10 September 2015, Moore announced he had signed with Universal Music Australia, with an album due in October. The lead single "Invincible" was released on 2 October. "Invincible" debuted at number 68. His debut studio album, A Thousand Lifetimes was announced on 27 October, with a release date of 6 November 2015.

In July 2016, Moore released a new single called, "Easy For You".

== Discography ==
=== Studio albums ===
Title	Album details	Peak chart positions
Title	Album details	AUS
A Thousand Lifetimes	Release date: 6 November 2015; Label: Universal Music Australia; Formats: Digital download, CD	5

=== Extended plays ===
Title	Album details
Symphony	Release date: 13 August 2013; Label: Joe Moore/ Ironbark Records.; Formats: Digital download, CD

=== Singles ===
Title	Year	Peak positions	Album
Title	Year	AUS	Album
"Symphony"	2013	52	Symphony EP
"Invincible"	2015	68	A Thousand Lifetimes
"Easy For You"	2016	/	single only

== Influences ==
Moore lists influences including; Oasis, Stereophonics, Jet, Robbie Williams, Coldplay, David Bowie, Eric Clapton, Level 42, Michael Bublé, Jason Mraz, Train, Eagle-Eye Cherry, Newton Faulkner, Seth Lakeman, Gary Moore, John Mayer, and Spring Chicken.

== Personal life ==
Moore has been married to Gina Harriet Jane Moore since 22 February 2020.
