= Cool It Down (song) =

2021 single by Coterie

Single by Coterie

from the album Coterie
- Released: 3 December 2021
- Genre: pop; reggae; dub
- Length: 4:28
- Label: Massive Records
- Songwriter(s): Antoni Fisher; Brandford Fisher; Conrad Fisher; Joshua Fisher; Tyler Fisher
- Producer(s): Coterie; Robby De Sá

Coterie singles chronology
"Good Morning" (2021)	"Cool It Down" (2021)	"Killing It Off" (2022)

Music video
- "Cool It Down" on YouTube

"Cool It Down" is a song by Australian-New Zealand band Coterie, released as their debut single through Massive Records in New Zealand in December 2021. The song reached the top 30 in New Zealand.

== Background and composition ==
The song was produced by the band at their home studio in their parents' living room in Perth, and features additional production by South African producer Robby De Sá. The song is an ode to their two homes, Tauranga in Aotearoa / New Zealand and West Coast Drive in Perth. The group composed the song together in writing sessions with an acoustic guitar, and was inspired by their inability to easily return home due to the COVID-19 pandemic, and the need to limit social interactions in the short-term, to be able to interact in the future.

== Release ==
The song was released as a single on 3 December 2021. The band translated the song into Māori with help from Tīmoti Kāretu, "Purea / Cool It Down" was released on 2 September 2022, and was one of the most commercially successful songs released for Te Wiki o te Reo Māori 2022.

== Critical reception ==
At the 2022 Waiata Māori Music Awards, "Cool It Down" was nominated for Best Waiata/Single by a Māori Artist, and for the Best Music Video awards.

== Credits and personnel ==
Credits adapted from Tidal.

- Coterie – performer, producer
- Robby De Sá – engineer, mixing engineer, producer
- Antoni Fisher – engineer, songwriting
- Brandford Fisher – songwriting
- Conrad Fisher – songwriting
- Joshua Fisher – engineer, songwriting
- Tyler Fisher – songwriting
- Paul Stefanidis – mastering engineer

== Charts ==
Chart (2022)	Peak position
New Zealand (Recorded Music NZ)	30

== Certifications ==
Certifications for "Cool It Down"
Region	Certification	Certified units/sales
New Zealand (RMNZ)	2× Platinum	60,000^{‡}
^{‡} Sales+streaming figures based on certification alone.

== Release history ==
Release dates and formats for "Cool It Down"
Region	Date	Edition	Format(s)	Label(s)	Ref.
Various	3 December 2021	Original	Digital download; streaming	Massive Records	
Various	2 September 2022	Māori language version	Digital download; streaming	Massive Records	
