= Nelson Brothers =

Australian stand-up comedy duo

The Nelson Twins (or Nelson Twins, Nelson Bros) are an Australian-based stand-up comedy duo consisting of identical twins Chris and Justin Nelson.

== Early life ==
The brothers grew up in New South Wales. They debuted their comedy act in 2006 and reached the grand finals of that year's city of Melbourne’s Angling for a Laugh comedy store competition with a performance designed to draw on their own experiences, growing up in their time and as identical twins and now work at Gisborne Secondary College.
