= Molly Poppinz =

Australian drag performer

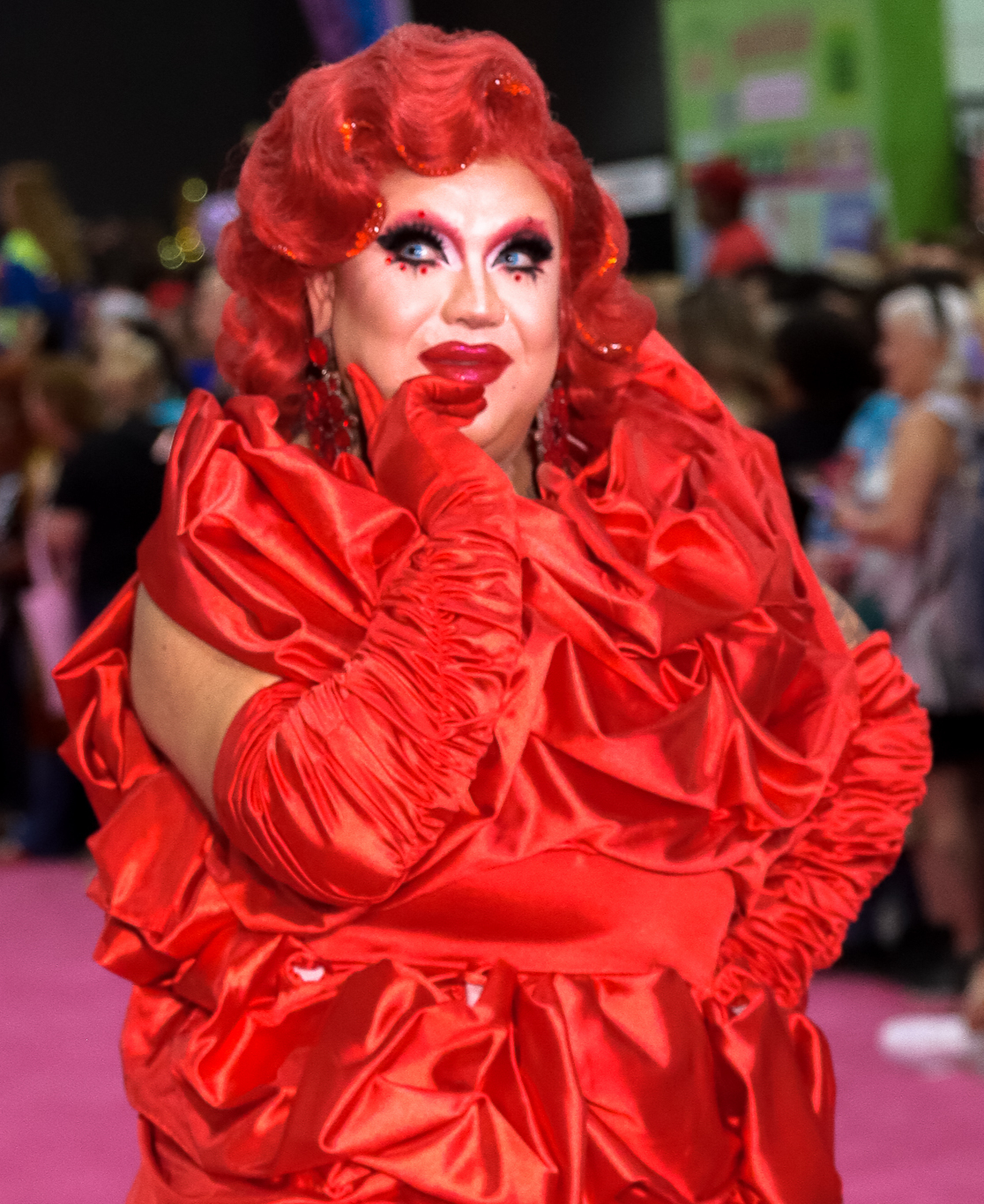
- Molly Poppinz at RuPaul's DragCon LA, 2023
- Born: Ricky Eldridge
- Television: RuPaul's Drag Race Down Under (season 2)

Molly Poppinz is the stage name of Ricky Eldridge, an Australian drag performer who competed on the second season of RuPaul's Drag Race Down Under.

== Career ==
Molly Poppinz worked as a drag performer in Vancouver from 2016 to 2019, before moving back to Newcastle, New South Wales. She has also performed in Sydney regularly.

Molly Poppinz competed on the second season of RuPaul's Drag Race Down Under. She won the season's first challenge and impersonated Orville Peck for the Snatch Game challenge. Molly Poppinz was eliminated after placing in the bottom two of the make-over challenge and losing a lip-sync battle against Hannah Conda. Molly Poppinz placed fourth overall. Michael Cook of Instinct said she "quickly proved herself as one to watch, with a star-making runway performance".

Molly Poppinz was confirmed as the host of B&T's 30 Under 30 awards night.

== Personal life ==
Eldridge is based in Newcastle.

== Filmography ==
- RuPaul's Drag Race Down Under
- Bring Back My Girls (2024)
