= Uncle Jed =

Australian funk, reggae and jazz band

- Also known as: Luna Grand
- Origin: Sydney, New South Wales, Australia
- Genres: Funk; soul; reggae; jazz
- Years active: 2005–present
- Labels: Vitamin; MGM
- Members: Danny Stitt; Laura Stitt; Shannon Stitt
- Website: unclejed.com.au

Uncle Jed is an Australian funk, reggae and jazz band. Formed in 2005 among family members, the lineup was Danny Stitt on bass and lead guitars, his brother, Shannon Stitt on keyboards and their cousin, Laura Stitt on lead vocals. In November 2013 the trio won the seventh season of the TV reality show, Australia's Got Talent. A self-titled album was issued in May 2010. Three of Uncle Jed's singles are cover versions, "Brother" (August 2013), "Give Me Love" (October) and "Just Give Me a Reason" (November), and all peaked in the ARIA Singles Chart top 50. The group briefly changed the band name to Luna Grand in May 2015 and released an extended play, Patience Love, in June.

== History ==
Uncle Jed was formed in 2005 in Sydney by Danny Stitt on bass and lead guitars, his brother, Shannon Stitt on keyboards and their cousin, Laura Stitt on lead vocals. The band's namesake, Jed Stitt, is Danny and Shannon's uncle and Laura's father. Uncle Jed released a self-titled album on 10 May 2010 on Vitamin Records. Lisa Moscatelli of The AU Review caught their support gig at Notes Live in July 2011 and described how the group, "opened the night with a beautiful blend of funk, reggae and jazz songs playing some of their funky originals and a mix of cover songs... One of the main highlights of Uncle Jed is that they didn't need to make much of an effort to make a positive impression. Their chilled-back style was sufficient for one to grow fond of their music, which made it a perfect way to end the week." Laura provided backing vocals for Jessica Mauboy.

Uncle Jed peaked at No. 74 on the ARIA Albums Chart on 18 November 2013, the week after their victory on TV reality quest, Australia's Got Talent's seventh season. The group were rewarded with $250,000 for their victory.

Ahead of the album, in August 2013, they had issued a cover version of Matt Corby's 2011 track, "Brother", which they used for their audition on Australia's Got Talent. Their version peaked at No. 36 on the ARIA Singles Chart in November. Their second single, "Give Me Love" (October), is a cover of Ed Sheeran's 2012 song, which they performed on Australia's Got Talent's semi-final – it reached No. 39. They quickly followed with their third single, a cover of Pink's track, "Just Give Me a Reason" (November), which made No. 49. All three singles were still in the top 100 when their self-titled album appeared in the related chart.

In May 2015 they changed their name to Luna Grand. Under the new name, they released a seven-track extended play, Patience Love, on 12 June 2015, which peaked at No. 8 on the ARIA Hit Seekers Albums chart. By November of that year they had reverted to their original name to release a five-track EP, Acoustic Versions. Uncle Jed issued another album, The Christmas Album, with standard festive season carols.

== Discography ==
=== Albums ===
- Uncle Jed (10 May 2010) – Vitamin Records
- The Christmas Album (21 November 2017) – independent

=== Extended plays ===
Luna Grand

- Patience Love (12 June 2015)

Uncle Jed

- Acoustic Versions (11 November 2015)

Preceded by Andrew De Silva	Winner of Australia's Got Talent; 2014	Succeeded by Fletcher Pilon
