= Sisters Doll =

Australian musical group

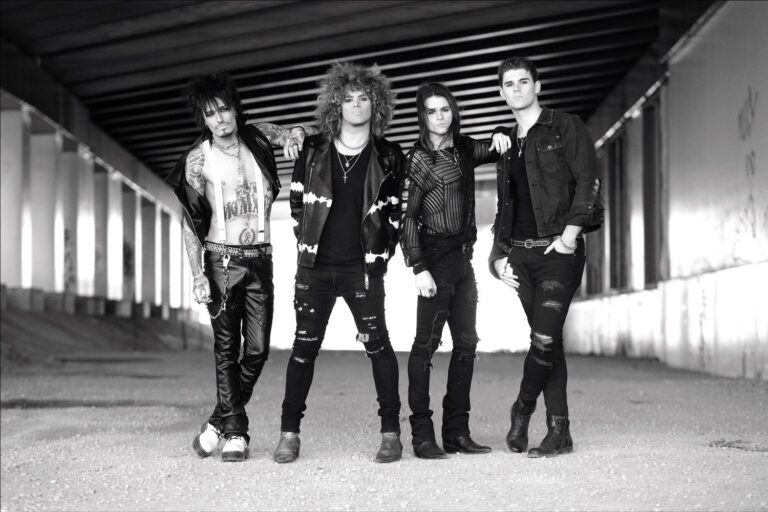

Background information
- Origin: Collie, Western Australia
- Genres: Glam rock; pop rock; hard rock
- Years active: 2010–present
- Labels: X Music
- Members: Brennan Mileto; Bryce Mileto; Austin Mileto; Sage Mileto
- Website: www.sistersdollband.com

Sisters Doll are an Australian Rock band from Collie, Western Australia, founded in 2010 and based in Melbourne as of 2014. The band have released three studio albums to date, with their third, Scars, peaking at number 11 on the ARIA Albums Chart.

== History ==
Sisters Doll are a family musical band from Collie, Western Australia, originally consisting of three brothers Brennan, Bryce and Austin Mileto, who credit their dad's musical collection of 1970s and 1980s rock 'n' roll music as the band's inspiration. They formed in 2010 and released their debut album in 2012.

In 2014, they relocated to Melbourne.

In 2016, they auditioned for Nine Network's Australia's Got Talent, placing second behind Fletcher Pilon.

In January 2017 the band released their second studio album, All Dolled Up.

In 2018, the band were judges on the debut season of Seven Network's All Together Now.

In 2024, Sage joined the group, expanding it from a trio to quartet.

In January 2025, the band released their third studio album Scars. They supported it with an UK tour.

== Members ==
- Brennan Mileto – vocals, rhythm guitar
- Austin Mileto – vocals, lead guitar
- Sage Mileto – vocals, bass guitar (2024-present)
- Bryce Mileto – vocals, drums

== Discography ==
=== Albums ===
List of albums, with selected chart positions
Title	Album details	Peak chart positions
Title	Album details	AUS
Welcome to the Dollhouse	Released: April 2012; Format: CD, digital; Label: Sisters Doll (AUIE512)	—
All Dolled Up	Released: January 2017; Format: CD, digital; Label: Sisters Doll (AUYQJ17)	—
Scars	Released: January 2025; Format: CD, digital; Label: X Music (SD003)	11
