= Kween Kong =

New Zealand drag performer

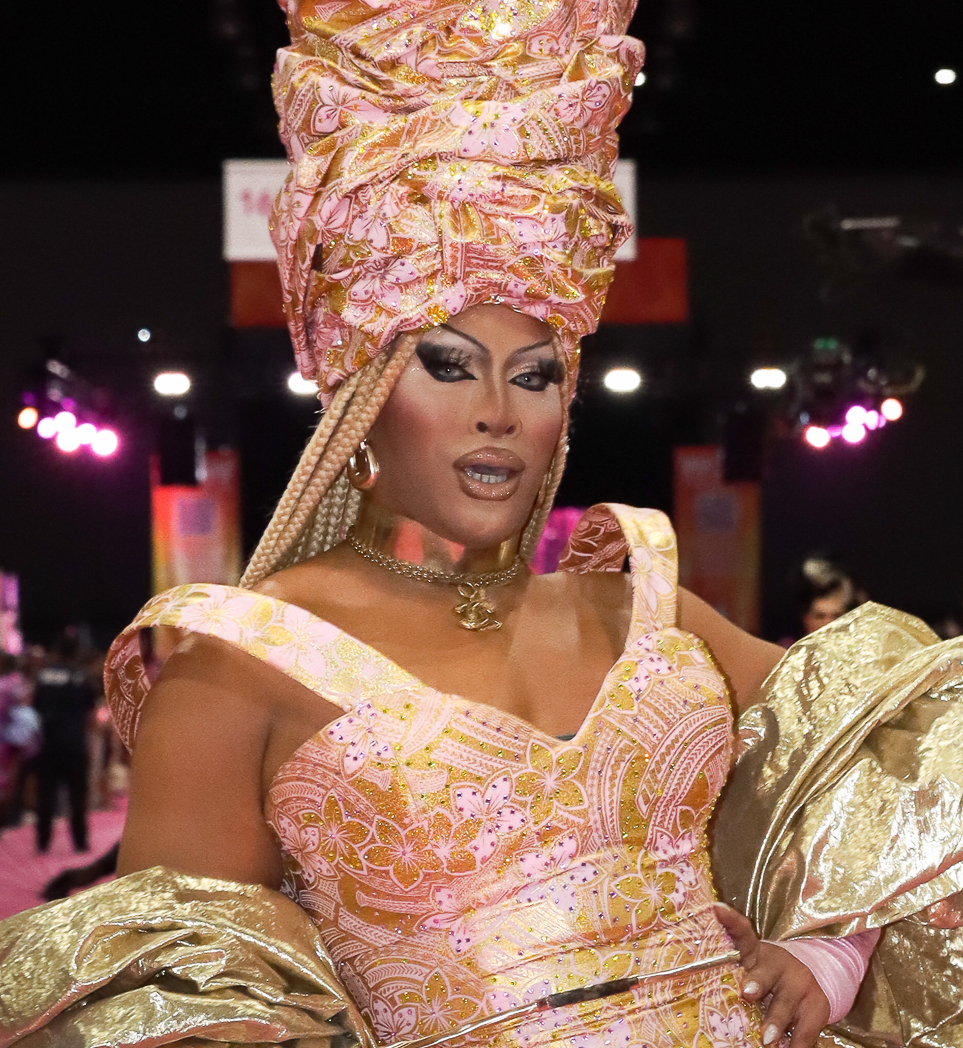
- Kween Kong at RuPaul's DragCon LA, 2024
- Born: Thomas Charles Fonua; 9 August 1992 (age 34); New Zealand
- Occupations: Drag performer, dancer
- Website: kweenkongofficial.com

Kween Kong is the stage name for the drag queen persona of Pasifika New Zealander former dancer Thomas Charles Fonua (born 9 August 1992). Kween Kong is best known for competing on the second season of RuPaul's Drag Race Down Under, where she was a runner-up, and later competing on RuPaul's Drag Race Global All Stars.

== Early life and education ==
Thomas Charles Fonua was born on born 9 August 1992 in New Zealand, a Pasifika New Zealander with Samoan and Tongan descent. Fonua speaks both languages, and says that language is important for maintaining his culture. He has two older brothers and a younger sister.

Fonua grew up in South Auckland, and began dancing aged seven, after his grandmother started teaching his sister to dance. He travelled to Samoa and Tonga as a child, staying with family and having to help out with chores. He was raised as a Jehovah's Witness, attending church several times a week with his family until he was around 16, when his parents split up. The family realised that he was gay quite early on.

When Fonua 16, he reached a fork in his life. One choice, encouraged by his father, was to play rugby for the New Zealand men's under-19 team, which could lead to a place with the All Blacks. The other was to join Black Grace, the top contemporary dance touring company in New Zealand. His father was worried that he would be laughed at if he became a dancer. He trained with Black Grace for two years, which meant moving away from home and touring with a much older group of performers. He had to go on tour to Germany for months, which he found very hard.

== Dance career ==
After completing his training with Black Grace, Fonua stayed with them for five years as a full-time principal dancer, which included international tours, Fonua was the recipient of an Indigenous Dance Residency, as a dancer and emerging choreographer at the Banff Centre for Arts and Creativity in Canada for at least three years. Also in Canada, he was an associate artist with Red Sky Performance, and performed at Toronto Dance Theatre.

Moving to Australia, Fonua danced with the Sydney Dance Company in Sydney. During his dance career, Fonua worked Neil Ieremia, Rafael Bonachela, Sidi Larbi Cherkaoui, Jock Soto, Douglas Wright, Raewyn Hill, Sandra Laronde, Ross McCormack, and others. After migrating to Australia in 2013 or 2014, Fonua joined the Australian Dance Theatre (ADT), based in Adelaide, South Australia, where he was a principal dancer for around seven years.

== Drag and performing artist ==
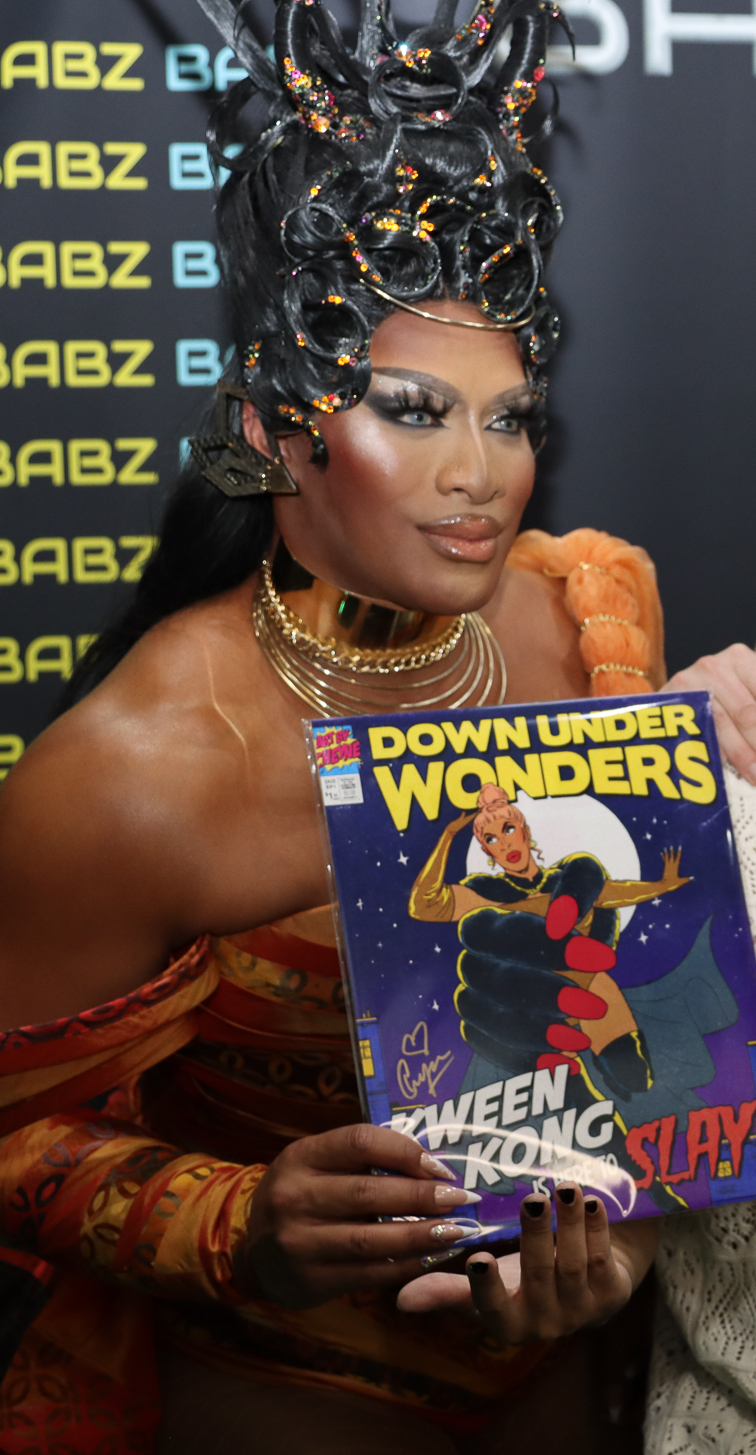
Kween Kong at RuPaul's DragCon LA in 2023

Living in Adelaide, Fonua and a friend took part in a Halloween-themed drag show, and then started doing drag, adopting an alter ego as a drag queen, Kween Kong. The name was originally Fonua's rugby nickname (because he was effeminate and like a bulldozer, "like a female gorilla", in his words). and Fonua says that it makes him feel strong.

In 2019, Fonua performed with Maggie Beer in the Adelaide Cabaret Festival, in Liner Notes Live, in which they toasted to the soundtrack of The Blues Brothers film. In March 2022, Kween Kong featured in Black Puddin', cabaret show in the Adelaide Fringe. In mid-2022, Fonua co-created, choreographed, and co-starred in Rella, a children's theatre production reimagining Cinderella presented by Windmill Theatre Co in Adelaide.

Fonua competed as Kween Kong on the second season of RuPaul's Drag Race Down Under, from 2 July 2022, and came in as a runner-up. Fonua was the first Pasifika person to appear on the show.

In September 2022, Fonua performed for 29 days at the Edinburgh Fringe performing in 27 Briefs Factory. In May 2023, he was in Los Angeles creating some music to be released later in the year.

== Other activities ==
Fonua started Haus of Kong, a collective offering employment and support to young people rejected by their families due to their sexuality, and to mentor emerging drag artists both personally and professionally.

Kween Kong's costumes are made by Adelaide-based costume-maker, Sheri McCoy, who works under the trade name of CostumeCreater.

Kween Kong is a voice actor in the 2025 Australian animated science fiction comedy Lesbian Space Princess, playing Blade.

== Awards and recognition ==
Fonua was the recipient of the New Zealand Prime Minister's Pacific Youth Award for Arts and Creativity in 2014. He is the recipient of an inaugural "30 Under 30" award by Coming Out Australia, supported by the Boston Consulting Group, in August 2019.

In 2019, Kween Kong won the Miss Drag Nation Australia title in Drag Nation Australia. Drag Nation is a national drag competition, with entrants first competing in state competitions, giving them an opportunity to represent their state in the national finals.

In 2022 Fonua was nominated for the Dora Award For Outstanding Choreography in Canada.

Year	Award	Category	Work	Result	Ref.
2023	Logie Awards of 2023	Graham Kennedy Award for Most Popular New Talent	RuPaul's Drag Race Down Under	Nominated	

== Media appearances ==
In January 2023, Fonua (as Kween Kong) was a guest on Australian TV show The Project with Hannah Conda. In May 2023, he was interviewed on the inaugural episode of Stories from the Pacific on ABC Radio. In February 2024, Fonua appeared with Australian journalist and television presenter Narelda Jacobs on Fran Kelly's podcast Yours Queerly.

== Discography ==
=== Singles ===
==== As lead artist ====
Song	Year	Album
"Global Savage"(with Jamaica Moana)	2024	Non-album singles

=== Featured singles ===
Title	Year	Album
"Bosom Buddies – BAB'Z Version" (The Cast of RuPaul's Drag Race Down Under)	2022	Non-album single
"Who Is She? – Cast Version" (RuPaul featuring Kween Kong, Spankie Jackzon, and Hannah Conda)	2022	Non-album single
"Everybody Say Love (D'Vybe Latinx Mix)" (The Cast of RuPaul's Drag Race Global All Stars)	2024	Non-album single

== Filmography ==
=== Television ===
Year	Title	Role	Notes
2022	RuPaul's Drag Race Down Under	Herself	Season 2 – Runner-up
2023	The Project	Herself	Guest with Hannah Conda
2023	Erotic Stories	Rachel Tension	1 episode
2024	Bring Back My Girls	Herself	Guest
2024	RuPaul's Drag Race Global All Stars	Herself	Contestant
2026	The Traitors	Faithful	Season 3; Contestant

=== Web series ===
Year	Title	Role	Notes	Ref
2024	My First Time	Herself	Produced by We Are Pride	

- Touch-Ups with Raven (2025)
- Lesbian Space Princess, (2025)
