= Faúx Fúr (drag queen) =

Australian drag performer

- Television: RuPaul's Drag Race Down Under (season 2)

Faúx Fúr is an Australian drag performer who competed on season 2 of RuPaul's Drag Race Down Under.

== Career ==
Faúx Fúr competed on season 2 of RuPaul's Drag Race Down Under. She was the first contestant eliminated from the competition, after placing in the bottom two on the first episode and losing a lip sync against Spankie Jackzon to "Get Outta My Way" (2010) by Kylie Minogue. Faúx Fúr has a weekly show on IGTV called Faux Mondays.

== Personal life ==
Faúx Fúr is of Vietnamese descent, and is based in Sydney.

== Filmography ==
=== Television ===
- RuPaul's Drag Race Down Under (season 2)
