= Bring Back My Girls =

Unscripted television series

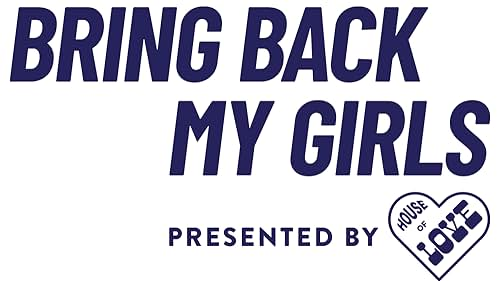
- Genre: Reality television
- Presented by: Ts Madison
- Opening theme: "Bring Back My Girls" by RuPaul
- Countries of origin: United Kingdom; United States
- No. of seasons: 4
- No. of episodes: 27

Production
- Production location: Various (Note: The production location varies from the Los Angeles Convention Center and the Exhibition Centre London.)
- Camera setup: Multi-camera
- Running time: 25–35 minutes
- Production company: World of Wonder

Original release
- Network: WOW Presents Plus
- Release: October 18, 2022 – present

Bring Back My Girls is a reality television series hosted by American television personality Ts Madison. The first season premiered October 18, 2022 on WOW Presents Plus.

The series is formatted as a reunion special, wherein every episode the contestants of selected seasons from the Drag Race franchise reunite. The series is filmed in front of a live audience during various RuPaul's DragCon expos. During the episodes, host Ts Madison and guests from the audience pose questions to the cast.

== Production ==
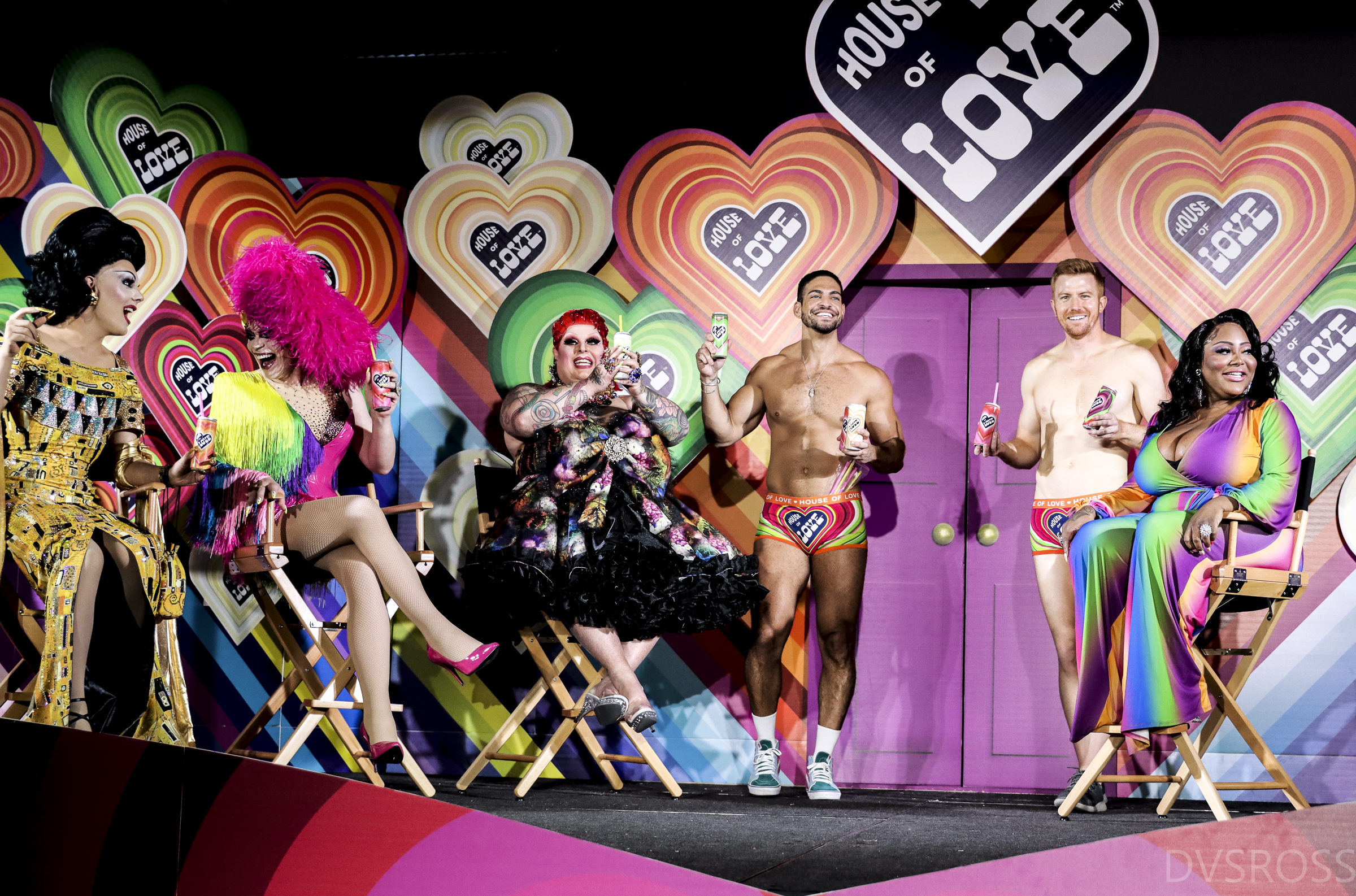
Ts Madison (far right) with cast members of RuPaul's Drag Race Down Under, as well as members of the Pit Crew, at RuPaul's DragCon LA in 2022

In May 2022, Alexandra del Rosario of Deadline Hollywood reported that the series' production company filmed a television reunion at their annual drag convention RuPaul's DragCon LA in Los Angeles. The series was included in late 2022 programming for their streaming service, WOW Presents Plus. In August 2022, a trailer was released and showcased new series such as Sketchy Queens, Tongue Thai'd, and Bring Back My Girls.

A second season was filmed at DragCon LA in 2023. A third season was filmed at DragCon UK in London in 2024. A fourth season was filmed at DragCon LA in 2024.

== Episodes ==
Season	Episodes	Originally released	
Season	Episodes	First released	Last released
1	7	October 18, 2022	November 29, 2022
2	7	December 6, 2023	January 17, 2024
3	7	June 17, 2024	July 29, 2024
4	6	December 4, 2024	January 8, 2025

=== Season 1 (2022) ===
No. overall	No. in season	Title	Original release date
1	1	"RuPaul's Drag Race: UK vs. the World Season 1"	October 18, 2022
Lemon, Blu Hydrangea, Pangina Heals, Mo Heart, Baga Chipz, Jujubee, Janey Jacké, Jimbo, and Cheryl Hole
2	2	"RuPaul's Drag Race Season 12"	October 25, 2022
Rock M. Sakura, Aiden Zhane, Widow Von'Du, Jan, Gigi Goode, Crystal Methyd, Jackie Cox, Heidi N Closet, Brita, Nicky Doll, and Dahlia Sin
3	3	"Canada's Drag Race Season 2"	November 1, 2022
Beth, Adriana, Océane Aqua-Black, Gia Metric, Kimora Amour, and Synthia Kiss
4	4	"RuPaul's Drag Race UK Seasons 1 & 2"	November 8, 2022
Season 1: Vinegar Strokes, Cheryl Hole, Blu Hydrangea, Baga Chipz, The Vivienne, and Sum Ting Wong Season 2: Lawrence Chaney, A'Whora, Tayce, and Tia Kofi
5	5	"Canada's Drag Race Season 1"	November 15, 2022
Ilona Verley, Tynomi Banks, Scarlett BoBo, Jimbo, Priyanka, Lemon, Kiara, and Juice Boxx
6	6	"RuPaul's Drag Race Down Under Season 1"	November 22, 2022
Etcetera Etcetera, Art Simone, and Maxi Shield
7	7	"Drag Race Holland Seasons 1 & 2"	November 29, 2022
Season 1: Envy Peru, Janey Jacké, and Sederginne Season 2: Love Masisi and Vanessa Van Cartier

=== Season 2 (2023–2024) ===
No. overall	No. in season	Title	Original release date
8	1	"RuPaul's Drag Race Season 14"	December 6, 2023
June Jambalaya, DeJa Skye, Jasmine Kennedie, Daya Betty, Orion Story, Maddy Morphosis, Kerri Colby, Lady Camden, Angeria Paris VanMicheals, and Alyssa Hunter
9	2	"RuPaul's Drag Race All Stars Season 6"	December 13, 2023
Jiggly Caliente, Scarlet Envy, Pandora Boxx, Jan, Ra'Jah O'Hara, and Kylie Sonique Love
10	3	"Drag Race Philippines Season 1"	December 20, 2023
Gigi Era, Prince, Minty Fresh, Eva Le Queen, Corazon, Turing, Viñas DeLuxe, Marina Summers, Precious Paula Nicole, and Jiggly Caliente
11	4	"Canada's Drag Race Season 3"	December 27, 2023
Miss Moço, Chelazon Leroux, Kaos, Jada Shada Hudson, Gisèle Lullaby, Bombae, Lady Boom Boom, Irma Gerd, Vivian Vanderpuss, and Miss Fiercalicious
12	5	"RuPaul's Drag Race Down Under Season 2"	January 3, 2024
Pomara Fifth, Beverly Kills, Kween Kong, Spankie Jackzon, Aubrey Haive, Minnie Cooper, Yuri Guaii, Molly Poppinz, and Hannah Conda
13	6	"RuPaul's Drag Race UK Seasons 3 & 4"	January 10, 2024
Season 3: Victoria Scone, Vanity Milan, Veronica Green, Ella Vaday, and Kitty Scott-Claus Season 4: Sminty Drop and Cheddar Gorgeous
14	7	"Canada's Drag Race: Canada vs. the World Season 1"	January 17, 2024
Anita Wigl'it, Kendall Gender, Icesis Couture, Ra'Jah O'Hara, Stephanie Prince, Vanity Milan, and Victoria Scone

=== Season 3 (2024) ===
No. overall	No. in season	Title	Original release date
15	1	"RuPaul's Drag Race UK Season 5"	June 17, 2024
Alexis Saint-Pete, Banksie, Cara Melle, DeDeLicious, Ginger Johnson, Kate Butch, Michael Marouli, Miss Naomi Carter, Tomara Thomas, and Vicki Vivacious
16	2	"Drag Race France Season 2"	June 24, 2024
Co-hosted with Nicky Doll Cookie Kunty, Ginger Bitch, Kitty Space, Moon, Piche, Rose, Sara Forever, and Vespi
17	3	"Drag Race España Season 3"	July 1, 2024
Co-hosted with Choriza May Bestiah, Clover Bish, Drag Chuchi, María Edilia, Pink Chadora, Pitita, and Visa
18	4	"RuPaul's Drag Race UK Season 4"	July 8, 2024
Baby, Black Peppa, Cheddar Gorgeous, Copper Topp, Dakota Schiffer, Danny Beard, Jonbers Blonde, Just May, Le Fil, Pixie Polite, Sminty Drop, and Starlet
19	5	"Drag Race Germany"	July 15, 2024
Guest-hosted by Barbie Breakout Kelly Heelton, LéLé Cocoon, Loreley Rivers, Pandora Nox, The Only Naomy, Victoria Shakespears, and Yvonne Nightstand
20	6	"Drag Race Belgique Season 1"	July 22, 2024
Co-hosted with Vanessa Van Cartier Amanda Tears, Brittany Von Bottoks, Drag Couenne, Edna Sorgelsen, Mademoiselle Boop, Mocca Bone, Peach, Susan, and Valenciaga
21	7	"Drag Race Italia Season 2"	July 29, 2024
Guest-hosted by Priscilla Aura Eternal, Gioffré, La Diamond, La Petite Noire, Narciso, and Nehellenia

=== Season 4 (2024–2025) ===
No. overall	No. in season	Title	Original release date
22	1	"RuPaul's Drag Race Season 16"	December 4, 2024
23	2	"RuPaul's Drag Race Season 16"	December 11, 2024
Amanda Tori Meating, Dawn, Geneva Karr, Hershii LiqCour-Jeté, Megami, Mhi'ya Iman Le'Paige, Mirage, Morphine Love Dion, Nymphia Wind, Plane Jane, Plasma, Q, Sapphira Cristál, and Xunami Muse
24	3	"RuPaul's Drag Race: UK vs. the World Season 2"	December 18, 2024
Choriza May, Gothy Kendoll, La Grande Dame, Hannah Conda, Jonbers Blonde, Keta Minaj, Marina Summers, Mayhem Miller, Scarlet Envy, and Tia Kofi
25	4	"Canada's Drag Race Season 4"	December 25, 2024
Aimee Yonce Shennel, Aurora Matrix, Denim, The Girlfriend Experience, Kiki Coe, Kitten Kaboodle, Luna DuBois, Melinda Verga, Nearah Nuff, Sisi Superstar
26	5	"Drag Race México Season 1"	January 1, 2025
Co-hosted with Lolita Banana Cristian Peralta, Lady Kero, Margaret Y Ya, Matraka, Pixie Pixie, Regina Voce, Serena Morena, and Vermelha Noir
27	6	"Drag Race Philippines Season 2"	January 8, 2025
Arizona Brandy, Bernie, Captivating Katkat, DeeDee Marié Holliday, Hana Beshie, M1ss Jade So, Matilduh and ØV Cünt
