= All Together Now (2018 Australian TV series) =

- Based on: All Together Now
- Presented by: Julia Zemiro; Ronan Keating
- Country of origin: Australia
- Original language: English
- No. of seasons: 1
- No. of episodes: 8

Production
- Running time: 60 minutes
- Production company: Endemol Shine Australia

Original release
- Network: Seven Network
- Release: 7 October – 25 November 2018

All Together Now is an Australian reality television music competition on the Seven Network which was presented by Julia Zemiro and Ronan Keating. It was based on the British show of the same name.

In June 2019, the series was cancelled and would not return for a second season.

== Format ==
In each episode, a range of singers take to the stage and are judged by "The 100" – a panel of one hundred music experts and performers from across Australia, headed by former Boyzone lead singer Ronan Keating.

== Summary ==
One season of the show was broadcast. In June 2019, Seven Network decided to cancel the show.

Season	Start	Finish	Winner	Runner-up	Presenter(s)
1	7 October 2018	25 November 2018	Lai Utovou	Tarryn Stokes	Julia Zemiro, Ronan Keating

== The 100 ==
The 100 are a range of music experts and performers from across Australia. They are cast to include a diverse mix of ages, backgrounds and a variety of music genres. The captain of The 100 is pop star Ronan Keating, whose vote carries no extra weight.

- Alex Reid - music talent manager
- Amanda Harrison – musical theatre star
- Amy Longhurst
- Andrew De Silva – lead singer for Boom Crash Opera & CDB, Australia's Got Talent winner 2012
- Anton Koritini
- Brendan De La Hay – cabaret performer
- Carl De Villa – original and tribute singer and artist
- Carla Troiano
- Chris Tamway - Indigenous guitarist and 2016 Australia's Got Talent contestant
- Christopher Booth - tenor voice and trumpeter/multi-mnstrumentalist (opera, jazz, rock, pop, Latin)
- Clarissa Spata - The Voice, season 9 contestant
- Connor Vidas - country singer
- Dan Murphy – Sydney DJ
- Daniel Spillane - Australian Idol season 3 contestant (5th place)
- Dean Ray – rock singer
- Diana Torossian
- Diane Regan
- DJ Jazzy
- Donna Jordee
- Dylan Wright - singer/songwriter
- Elisa James
- Ellen Reed – The Voice grand finalist
- Emily Rex
- Eva Spata
- Gemma Lyon
- German Silva
- Glenn Whitehall - The Voice season 1 contestant
- Gospo Collective's Ben Gillard & Charmaine Jones – gospel choir directors
- Greg Gould – powerhouse vocalist, Australia's Got Talent finalist
- Hugh Barrington
- Hugh Wilson
- Inkasounds - James & Robyn
- Jacqueline Dark – opera singer
- Jason Baclig & Lachlan Hay
- Jason Jackson – Michael Jackson impersonator
- Jay Boyle
- Jay Parrino – rock singer, virtuoso guitarist, Australia's Got Talent finalist
- Jeremy Brennan – pianoman
- Jess & Matt – popstar couple
- Jessica Matthews
- Jhay
- John Longmuir – opera singer
- Jordan Raskopoulos – musical comedian and LGBTQI advocate
- Josie Palermo
- Kattimoni – soul singer
- Kayo Marbilus – ARIA charts recording artist, songwriter, actor
- Kellie Crawford (née Hoggart) – singer and actress, award-winning entertainer (Teen Queens and Hi-5)
- Komiti Levai - soul singer/songwriter
- Kristy James - singer/songwriter
- Lara Mulcahy – comedy actress, vocal coach and singer
- Liam Burrows
- Liam O'Byrne
- Lisa Viola
- Lolo Lovina
- Luke Zanchanaro & Tannah de Gersigny
- Lucy Holmes – breakfast radio host/Kylie Minogue impersonator
- Maria Mercedes – industry legend
- Mark Gable – The Choirboys frontman
- Mary Kiani - former Scottish Queen of Pop and powerhouse vocalist
- May Johnston – funk and soul diva
- Melanie Lewin
- Michael Cormick
- Michael Dalton – cabaret performer
- Mike Scott
- Mini Marilyn – cabaret character (performed by Elizabeth Evans)
- Minnie Cooper – iconic Sydney drag queen
- Missy Lancaster – country singer-songwriter
- Mitch Tambo
- Monique Montez
- Mys T - performing artist/vocal coach
- Natasha Pinto - singer and wife of Gary Pinto
- Nikki Bennett
- Paula Baxter - soul singer
- Phil Golotta
- Pia Anderson
- Rada Tochalna
- Ray Isaac
- Rhonda Burchmore – singer and entertainer
- Rhys Tolhurst – singer/songwriter
- Richard Joyce
- Richard Valdez
- Rocco Bene - singer/songwriter
- Rose Farrell
- Rufus Barr - Sydney Karaoke Host
- Rupert Noffs - NIDA-trained "triple threat"
- Ryan Smith
- Saba Saliba - The Voice, season 12 contestant
- Samantha Leith
- Samuel Gaskin - singer/songwriter/entertainer/managing director @BEATENTERTAINMENT
- Sarah Capodicasa
- Scot Finnie
- Shauna Jensen – Australian singer
- Sharon Calabro - Australian singer and musical performer
- Siki Daha
- Silvie Paladino – musical theatre performer
- Sisters Doll – glam rock trio
- Sophie Carter
- Steve Wood
- Take Two – rapping twins
- Tarisai Vushe – Australian Idol 2007 Top 5 and The Lion King singer
- Vanessa Powell
- Victoria McGee
- Wil Sabin – creative director, choreographer, and entertainment consultant
