= Cristian Peralta =

Mexican drag queen

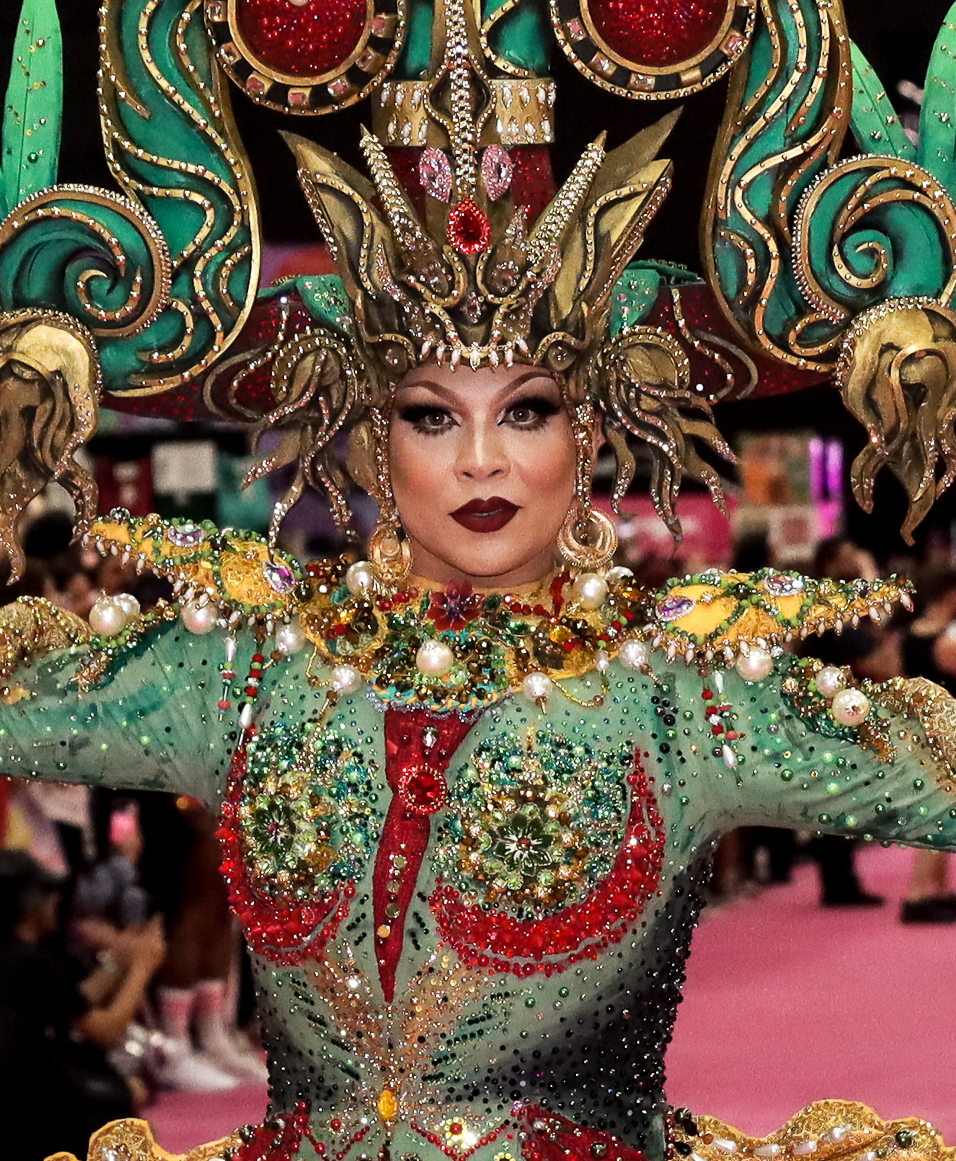
- Peralta at RuPaul's DragCon LA, 2024
- Born: October 2, 1986 (age 39); San Pedro, Tlaquepaque, Jalisco, Mexico
- Occupation: Drag queen
- Television: Drag Race México
- Children: 1

Cristian Peralta is a Mexican drag performer and the winner of the first season of Drag Race México.

== Career ==
Peralta is a drag performer who won the first season of Drag Race México (2023). On the first episode, she wore a "Tlaquepaque jug-inspired look that transformed into a folkloric dress" and won the challenge. She impersonated Verónica Castro for the Snatch Game challenge, and won five challenges overall before beating out three other finalists in the last episode. Evan Lambert of Xtra Magazine opined, "She served up a dramatic reveal in the season's first runway, and continued to deliver a potent mix of style, talent, modesty and dedication throughout her season. Her lovability was undeniable."

== Personal life ==
Peralta is originally from San Pedro, Tlaquepaque, and lives in Guadalajara, as of 2023. He has been described as heterosexual and has identified as pansexual. He has a wife and daughter.

== Filmography ==
=== Television ===
Year	Title	Role	Notes
2023	Drag Race México season 1	Herself (contestant)	Winner
2025	Bring Back My Girls	Guest	Season 4 Episode 5

== See also ==
- List of drag queens
- List of pansexual people
