= Australia's Got Talent season 7 =

Australia's Got Talent
- Season 7
- Hosted by: Julia Morris
- Judges: Dawn French; Timomatic; Geri Halliwell; Kyle Sandilands
- Winner: Uncle Jed
- Runner-up: Greg Gould

Release
- Original network: Nine Network
- Original release: 11 August – 10 November 2013

Season chronology
- ← Previous; Season 6 Next → Season 8

Australia's Got Talent is an Australian reality television show, based on the original UK series, to find new talent. The seventh season aired on the Nine Network from 11 August 2013 until 10 November 2013. Kyle Sandilands returned as a judge for his fourth season, and was joined by Dawn French, Timomatic and Geri Halliwell, as well as Julia Morris as the new host. Halliwell, French and Timomatic who is the additional fourth judge replaced original judge Dannii Minogue and Brian McFadden, while Morris replaced Grant Denyer. It was the first time that the show aired on another network, following its axing from the Seven Network in October 2012. The auditions took place from March–April 2013.

== Season overview ==
Judges for Australia's Got Talent Season 7

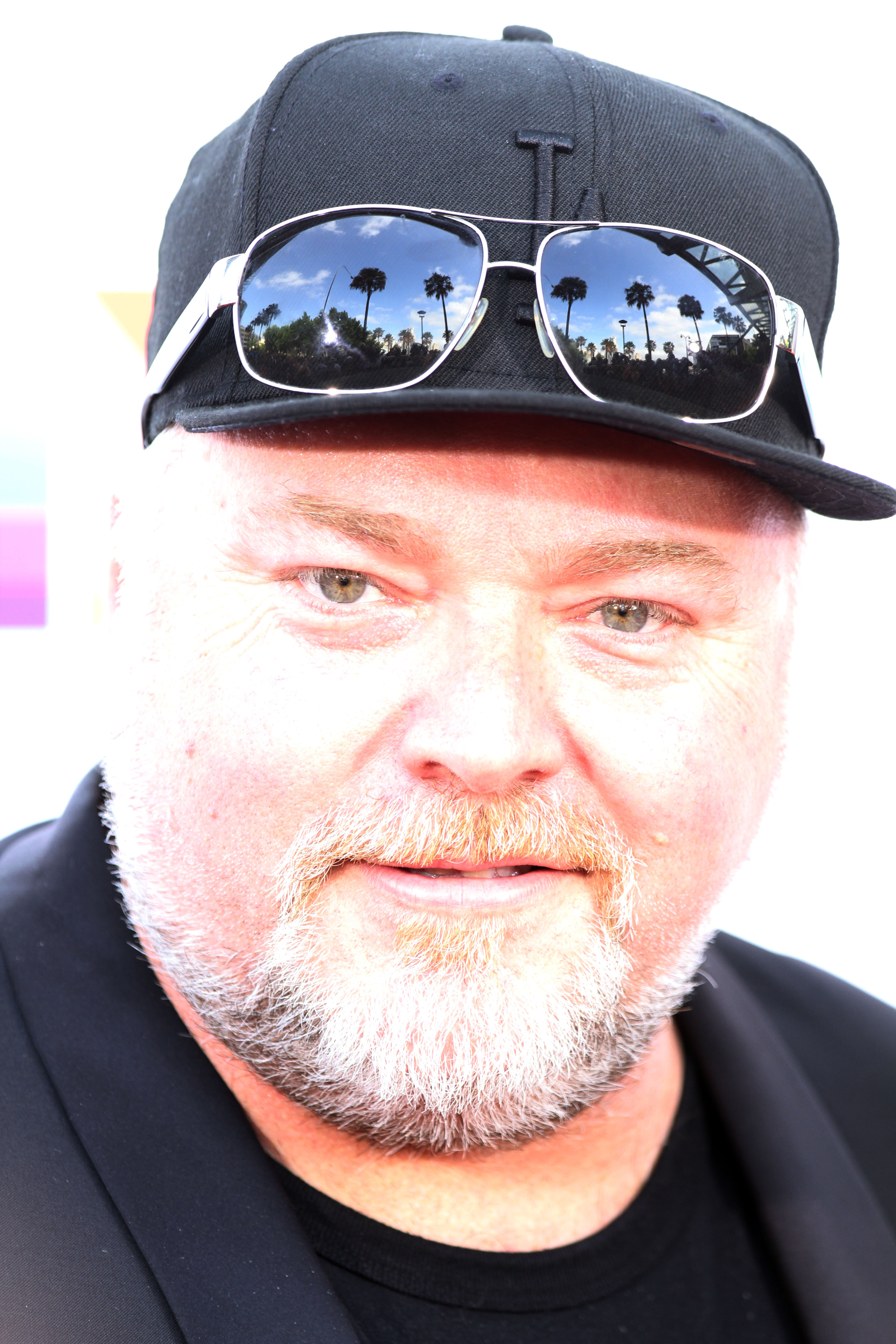
Kyle Sandilands

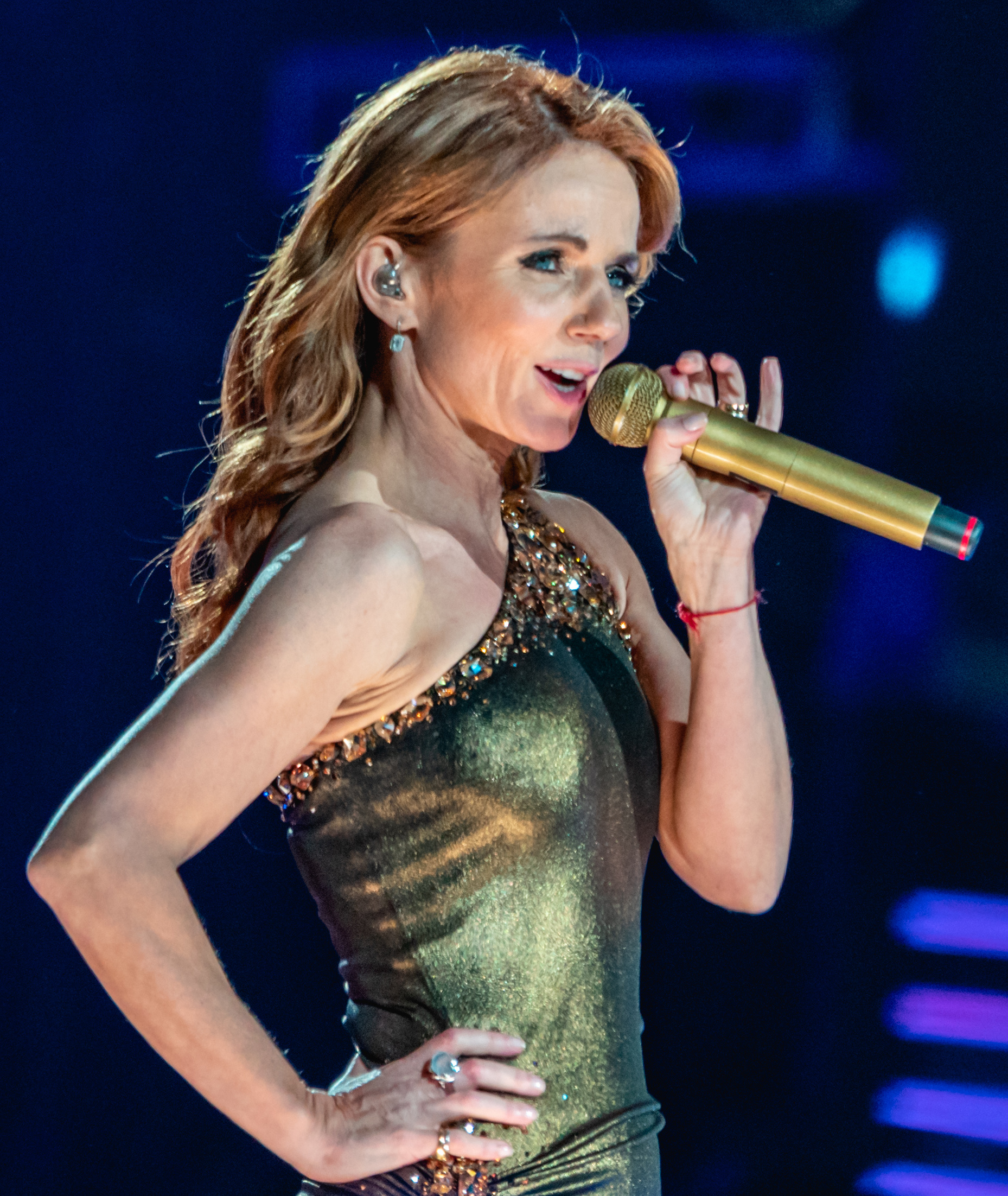
Geri Halliwell

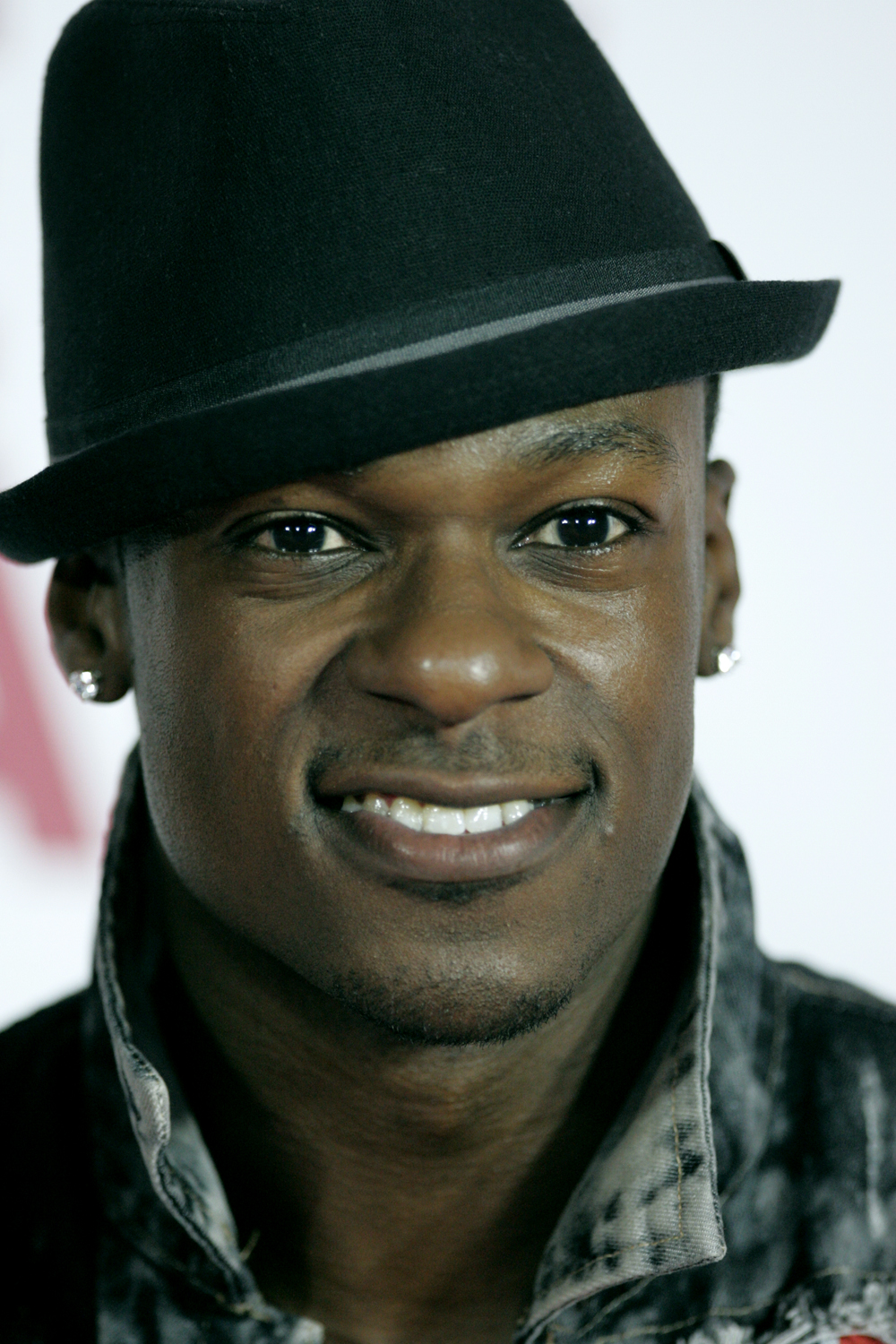
Timomatic

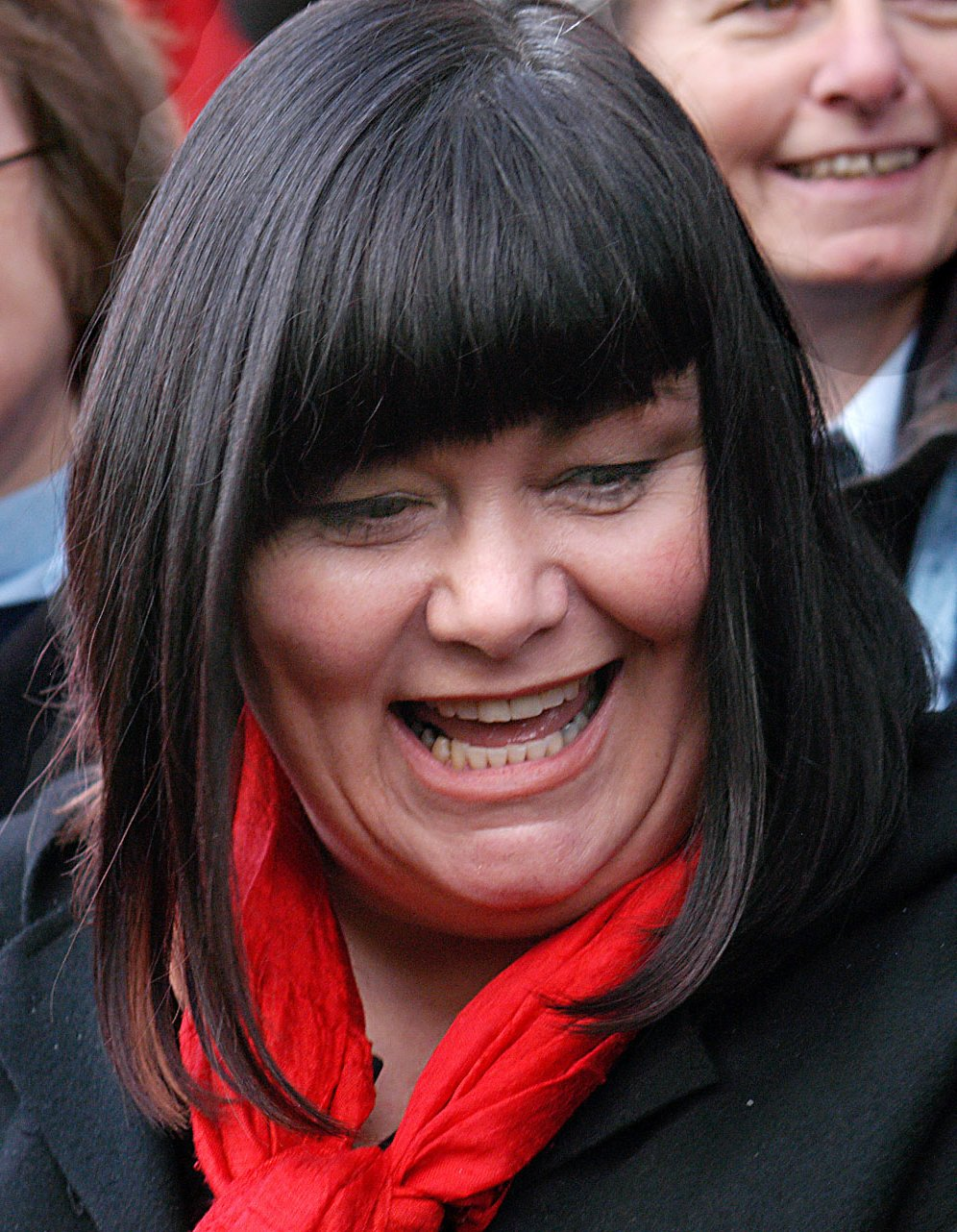
Dawn French

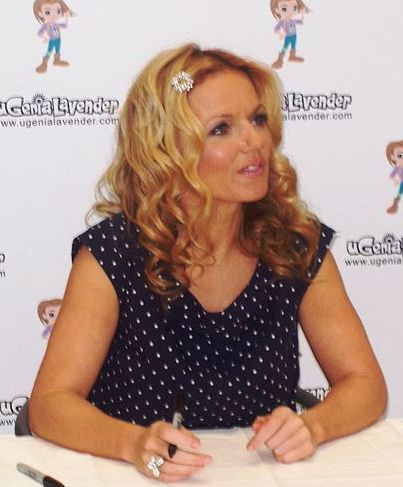
On 29 April 2013, Nine confirmed that Geri Halliwell would replace Brown as the fourth judge.

In October 2012, original host Grant Denyer confirmed he would not return to the show. In November and December 2012, it was also confirmed that Dannii Minogue, Brian McFadden and Kyle Sandilands would all not return to the judging panel following the show's reboot. Nine stated that it was looking for a "fresh, new panel", ruling out original judge Minogue who had sat on the panel since the show's debut in 2007. This was the first season in the show's history to feature four judges.

On 17 March 2013, it was announced that Melanie Brown of Spice Girls would replace Minogue as a judge. A day later, it was announced that comedian Dawn French would replace McFadden on the panel. On 19 March 2013, it was announced that former participant Tim Omaji, otherwise known as Timomatic, had signed up to the panel. On 20 March 2013, it was announced that Sandilands would return to reprise his role on the panel despite constant rumours that he would be leaving the show. Later that day, Julia Morris was confirmed as the host of the new season.

On 20 March 2013, it was reported that Seven, the show's former network, had won a legal injunction preventing Brown from signing onto any shows airing on Nine until 31 January 2014, thus putting her role on the show in doubt. Producers were forced to look for a new fourth judge after a Supreme Court judge ruled that the injunction preventing Brown from working for any Australian network other than Seven was to remain in place. On 29 April 2013, Nine confirmed that Geri Halliwell would replace Brown as the fourth judge.

This season's judges table and X's on the stage looked identical to the ones on Britain's Got Talent. In addition, the sound of the fourth judge's buzzer sounded identical to the one on America's Got Talent when an act had been buzzed out, while the others' sounded identical to the ones on Britain's Got Talent.

== Auditions ==
In December 2012, it was announced that the auditions would take place from March 2013. There were various options for auditioning, such as attending the correct venue on the correct day with the questionnaire (which could be found on the website or completed on audition day), sending a DVD in with the act on it, or applying online. The following list contains all of the cities, venues and dates of the auditions. The auditions took place from March–April 2013.

Audition City	Date	Venue
Cairns, Queensland	3 March 2013	Shangri-La Hotel Event Centre
Perth, Western Australia	10 March 2013	Perth Convention & Exhibition Centre
Adelaide, South Australia	12 March 2013	Adelaide Showground
Canberra, Australian Capital Territory	16 April 2013	Rydges Lakeside Canberra
Melbourne, Victoria	16–17 March 2013	Mooney Valley Racing Club, Market Place
Coffs Harbour, New South Wales	19 March 2013	Opal Cove Resort
Newcastle, New South Wales	24 March 2013	Newcastle City Hall
Dubbo, New South Wales	26 March 2013	Dubbo RSL Club Resort
Hobart, Tasmania	6 April 2013	Hotel Grand Chancellor, Hobart
Launceston, Tasmania	7 April 2013	Hotel Grand Chancellor, Launceston
Albury, New South Wales	9 April 2013	Albury Entertainment Centre
Sydney, New South Wales	13–14 April 2013	Sydney Showground
Darwin, Northern Territory	21 April 2013	Crowne Plaza Darwin
Brisbane, Queensland	27–28 April 2013	Sofitel Brisbane Central

== Semi-finalists ==
Key	Winner	Runner up	Finalist	Semi-Finalist (lost judges' vote)

Name	Genre	Act	Age(s)	Semi	Position reached
Academy of Brothers	Dance	Dance Group	15-22	3	Finalist
Angel Tairua	Singing	Singer	13	3	Finalist
Aydan Calafiore	Singing	Singer	12	1	Semi-Finalist
Chantelle & Benji	Danger	Rollerskate Duo	30 & 29	1	Semi-Finalist
Chloe Marlow	Singing	Singer	11	6	Semi-Finalist
Dapper	Dance	Dance Group	13-16	5	Semi-Finalist
Darren Carr	Comedy	Ventriloquist	48	1	Semi-Finalist
Dean Brady	Singing	Singer	9	4	Finalist
Flying Fruit Fly Circus	Acrobatics	Acrobatic Group	10-19	2	Semi-Finalist
Girl Class	Singing	Vocal Group	17-23	3	Semi-Finalist
Greg Gould	Singing	Band	21-31	6	Runner-up
Joanna Littlewood-Johnson	Dance	Pole Dancer	43	6	Semi-Finalist
Juan & Angela	Dance	Dance Duo	27 & 28	5	Semi-Finalist
Julius Firdaus	Singing	Opera Singer	28	6	Semi-Finalist
Lee Academy	Acrobatics	Acrobatic Group	9-22	4	Semi-Finalist
Leon Lee	Singing	Singer	19	2	Semi-Finalist
Loretta & Jackson	Animals	Dog Act	56 & 4	2	Semi-Finalist
Louise Kennedy	Singing	Singer	59	1	Semi-Finalist
Michael Boyd	Magic	Illusionist	42	3	Semi-Finalist
Miles Elkington	Singing	Singer	16	4	Semi-Finalist
Ministry of Dance	Dance	Dance Group	12-23	6	Semi-Finalist
Miss Friby & the Fribbles	Comedy	Entertainers	23 & 28	4	Semi-Finalist
Natalie & Julia	Singing	Singing Duo	10	1	Semi-Finalist
Oscar & Joshua Han	Music	Pianist and Violinist	12 & 10	5	Finalist
Paris Morgan	Singing	Singer	13	5	Semi-Finalist
Raymond Crowe	Variety	Entertainer	51	2	Semi-Finalist
Reuben Koops	Singing	Singer	19	2	Semi-Finalist
Sam Powers	Magic	Illusionist	29	6	Finalist
Scott Carnes	Dancer	Dancer	47	1	Semi-Finalist
Seaton Kay-Smith	Comedy	Comedian	27	3	Semi-Finalist
Swagamama	Dance	Dance Group	20-35	1	Finalist
Team KSTP	Acrobatics	Gymnastics Team	10-16	5	Semi-Finalist
Tommy Franklin	Dance	Dancer	29	2	Finalist
The Brassholes	Music	Brass Band	19-23	4	Semi-Finalist
The Foenander Brothers	Singing	Singing Duo	50 & 53	4	Finalist
The Funky Bunny	Singing	Singer	31	2	Semi-Finalist
The Other Superman	Acrobatics	Aerialist	40	1	Finalist
The Real Fruit Ninja	Variety	Novelty Act	42	5	Semi-Finalist
The Rybka Twins	Acrobatics	Contortionists	17	3	Semi-Finalist
Uncle Jed	Singing	Band	26-29	5	Winner
Valère	Singing	Singer	22	6	Semi-Finalist
X-Treme Team	Acrobatics	Martial Arts Team	13-25	4	Semi-Finalist
Yu Hui	Dance	Dancer	29	3	Semi-Finalist

== Semi-final summary ==
Buzzed Out | Judges' choice
Won Online Public Vote | Won Judges' Vote | Lost Judges' Vote

=== Semi-final 1 ===
Semi-Finalist	Order	Buzzes and Judges' votes				Result
Semi-Finalist	Order	Sandilands	Halliwell	Timomatic	French	Result
Swagamama	1					Advanced
Natalie & Julia	2					Eliminated
Darren Carr	3					Eliminated
Chantelle & Benji	4					Eliminated
Louise Kennedy	5					Eliminated
Aydan Calafiore	6					Eliminated
Scott Carnes	7					Eliminated
The Other Superman	8					Advanced

=== Semi-final 2 ===
Semi-Finalist	Order	Buzzes and Judges' votes				Result
Semi-Finalist	Order	Sandilands	Halliwell	Timomatic	French	Result
Leon Lee	1					Eliminated
Raymond Crowe	2					Advanced
Loretta and Jackson	3					Eliminated
Reuben Koops	4					Eliminated
Flying Fruit Fly Circus	5					Eliminated
The Funky Bunny	6					Eliminated
Tommy Franklin	7					Advanced

=== Semi-final 3 ===
Semi-Finalist	Order	Buzzes and Judges' votes				Result
Semi-Finalist	Order	Sandilands	Halliwell	Timomatic	French	Result
Academy of Brothers	1					Advanced
Michael Boyd	2					Eliminated
Girl Class	3					Eliminated
The Rybka Twins	4					Eliminated
Seaton Kay-Smith	5					Eliminated
Yu Hui	6					Eliminated
Angel Tairua	7					Advanced

=== Semi-final 4 ===
Semi-Finalist	Order	Buzzes and Judges' votes				Result
Semi-Finalist	Order	Sandilands	Halliwell	Timomatic	French	Result
X-Treme Team	1					Eliminated
Miles Elkington	2					Eliminated
The Brassholes	3					Eliminated
Lee Academy	4					Eliminated
The Foenander Brothers	5					Advanced
Miss Friby & the Fribbles	6					Eliminated
Dean Brady	7					Advanced

=== Semi-final 5 ===
Semi-Finalist	Order	Buzzes and Judges' votes				Result
Semi-Finalist	Order	Sandilands	Halliwell	Timomatic	French	Result
Dapper	1					Eliminated
Paris Morgan	2					Eliminated
Juan & Angela	3					Eliminated
The Real Fruit Ninja	4					Eliminated
Team KSTP	5					Eliminated
Oscar & Joshua Han	6					Advanced
Uncle Jed	7					Advanced

=== Semi-final 6 ===
Semi-Finalist	Order	Buzzes and Judges' votes				Result
Semi-Finalist	Order	Sandilands	Halliwell	Timomatic	French	Result
Sam Powers	1					Advanced
Chloe Marlow	2					Eliminated
Joanna Littlewood-Johnson	3					Eliminated
Julius Firdaus	4					Eliminated
Ministry of Dance	5					Eliminated
Valère	6					Eliminated
Greg Gould	7					Advanced

== Finals summary ==
Finalist	Order	Finished
The Rybka Twins	1	Eliminated
Greg Gould	2	Runner-Up
Tommy Franklin	3	Eliminated
Sam Powers	4	Eliminated
Swagamama	5	Eliminated
Uncle Jed	6	Winner
Oscar and Joshua Han	7	Eliminated
The Foenander Brothers	8	Eliminated
Dean Brady	9	Eliminated
The Other Superman	10	Eliminated
Raymond Crowe	11	Eliminated
Academy of Brothers	12	Eliminated

== Ratings ==
Episode	Air date	Total viewers (millions)	Nightly Rank
Auditions 1	11 August	1.044	6
Auditions 2	18 August	1.212	5
Auditions 3	25 August	1.183	5
Auditions 4	1 September	1.124	4
Auditions 5	8 September	1.113	4
Auditions 6	15 September	1.172	6
Semi-final 1	22 September	0.982	6
Semi-final 2	29 September	1.010	5
Semi-final 3	7 October	0.939	8
Semi-final 4	13 October	0.801	11
Semi-final 5	20 October	0.850	6
Semi-final 6	27 October	0.712	9
Final Performances	3 November	0.742	2
Grand Finale	10 November	1.166	4
Winner Announced	10 November	1.391	1
