= Spankie Jackzon =

New Zealand drag performer

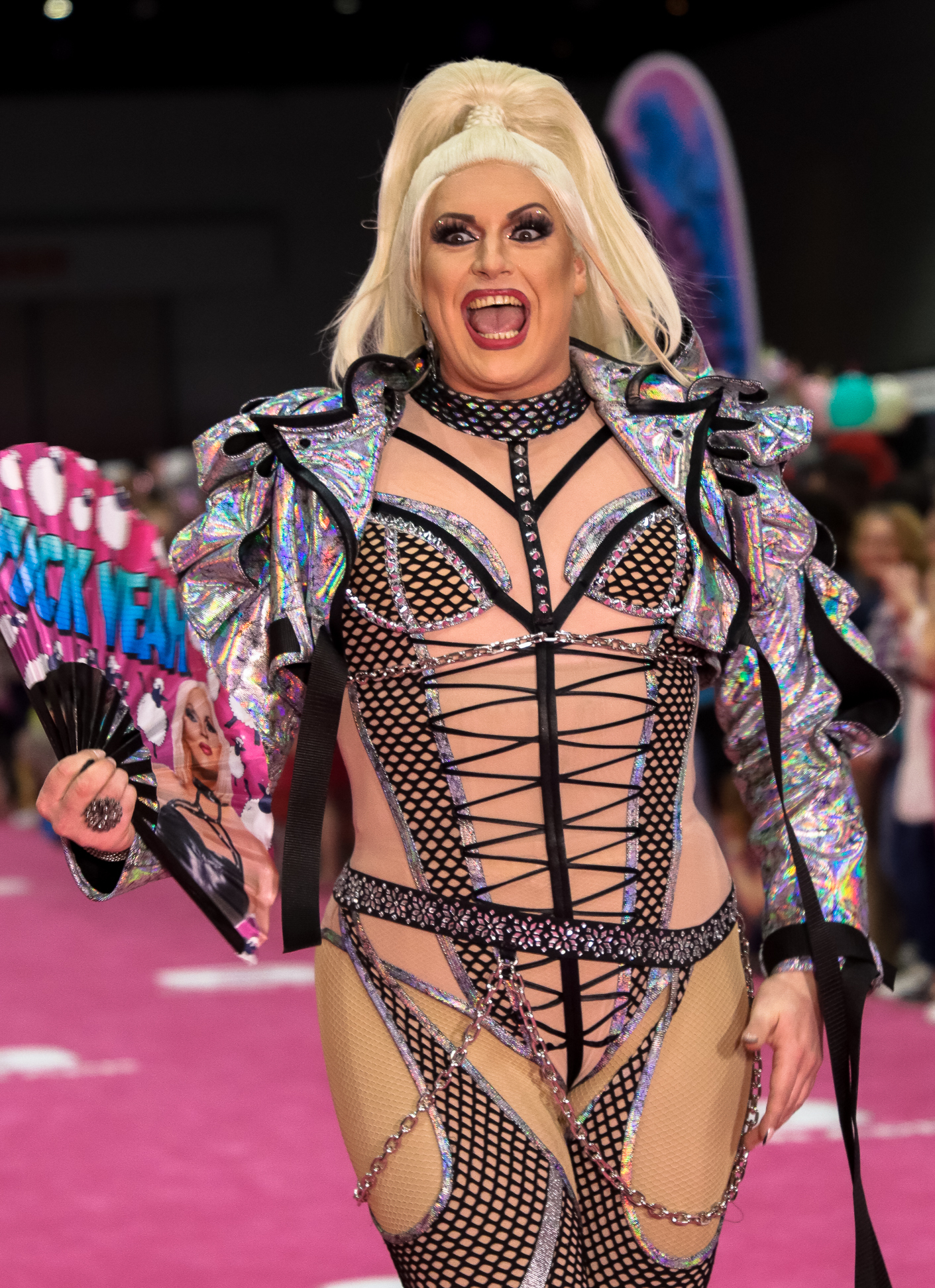
- Spankie Jackzon at RuPaul's DragCon LA, 2023
- Born: Blair Macbeth; 4 November 1984 (age 41); Palmerston North, New Zealand
- Occupation: Drag queen
- Years active: 2005–present
- Television: House of Drag (season 2); RuPaul's Drag Race Down Under (season 2)
- Website: spankiejackzon.com

Spankie Jackzon is the stage name of Blair Macbeth (born 4 November 1984), a New Zealand drag performer. She is best known for winning the second season of RuPaul's Drag Race Down Under in 2022. Previously, in 2020, she also won the second season of the New Zealand television series House of Drag. In 2024, she became a judge on Drag Race Down Under.

== Career ==
Jackzon is based in Palmerston North. She started performing in drag as early as 2005, moving to Melbourne in the late 2010s to develop a career in the city's nightlife; at one point in her career, she hosted eight different club residences simultaneously in the city of Melbourne.

In 2020, Jackzon joined the second season of the New Zealand television series House of Drag as an "intruder" contestant in the fourth episode. She won the competition, beating Elektra Shock in the finale.

In 2022, Jackzon was announced as one of 10 queens to compete on the second season of RuPaul's Drag Race Down Under, and after winning three main challenges, she won the season, with Hannah Conda and Kween Kong as runners-up. One of the hosts of House of Drag, Kita Mean, who previously won the first season of Rupaul's Drag Race Down Under, presented Jackzon with her crown and sceptre during the final episode of the second season, marking the second time that Mean crowned Jackzon on television (House of Drag and RuPaul’s Drag Race Down Under).

In 2024, Spankie participated in season 8 of Celebrity Treasure Island. She medically retired herself after being close to passing out after a swim leg in the race, having lost most of her fitness as a high school representative swimmer.

== Filmography ==
=== Television ===
Year	Show	Character	Network	Placing	Notes
2020	House of Drag	Herself	TVNZ	Season 2 — Winner	
2022	RuPaul's Drag Race Down Under	Herself	WOW presents, TVNZ, Stan	Season 2 — Winner	
2024	The Boy, The Queen & Everything inbetween	Stiff Tiff	TVNZ		
2024	Bring Back My Girls	Herself	WOW Presents		
2024	Celebrity Treasure Island 2024	Herself	TVNZ	Season 8 - 13th Medical retirement	

Preceded by Kita Mean	Winner of RuPaul's Drag Race Down Under; Australian/New Zealand season 2	Succeeded by Isis Avis Loren
