= Saint Mary's Catholic College, Queensland =

St Mary's Catholic College

Location
- Cairns, Queensland; Australia; 16°58′8″S 145°44′28″E

Information
- Type: Independent, co-educational, secondary, day
- Motto: Latin: Educare Et Santificare (Educate and Sanctify)
- Religious affiliation: Catholic Diocese of Cairns
- Denomination: Roman Catholicism
- Established: 1986; 40 years ago
- Founder: Hugh O’Brien
- Principal: Wayne Wood
- Grades: 7–12
- Colours: Green, white and maroon
- Affiliations: St Gerard Majella
- Website: www.smcc.qld.edu.au

St Mary's Catholic College, (also known as St Mary's), is a Catholic co-educational secondary school in Cairns, Queensland, Australia.

St Mary's is situated behind its sister school, St. Gerard Majella, with most St. Gerard's graduates attending St Mary's the following year. The school which was founded in 1986 holds annual "Tours of the College" where parents can view the facilities at the college, however an appointment can be made to have a tour at any time of the year.

This school is operated by the Catholic Diocese of Cairns.

In January 2014 the school opened a $450,000 fitness centre to help students pursue a career in fitness.

== School houses ==
St Mary's has four houses which are named after various bishops of Cairns and its surrounding dioceses. They are as follows:

- Cahill
- Heavey
- Hutchinson
- Murray

These four houses compete against each in many activities, including annual Athletics and Swimming Carnivals, Cross Country and Debating. These events build up to a House Cup which is awarded at the end of each year. A house is also awarded a Participation Cup, won by house points garnered a from voluntary participation in various activities throughout the year.

These houses also battle out every year for the "Best House" award, which is given to the house with the most awarded points throughout yearly carnivals, such as Athletics Day, Cross Country and Yearly Swimming Carnival, which is held at the Woree Pool Cairns.

== Notable alumni ==
- Marita Cheng, Roboticist and Entrepreneur
- Rhys Tolhurst, Australian singer/songwriter

== See also ==
- Catholic Education Cairns
- Catholic education in Australia
- List of schools in Far North Queensland
