= Yuri Guaii =

New Zealand drag performer

Yuri
- Television: RuPaul's Drag Race Down Under (season 2); The Boulet Brothers' Dragula (season 6)
- Website: yuriguaii.com

Yuri (formerly known as Yuri Guaii) is a New Zealand drag performer who competed on season 2 of RuPaul's Drag Race Down Under and season 6 of The Boulet Brothers' Dragula.

== Career ==
Yuri began doing drag at the age of 18 and studied fashion design. She competed on season 2 of RuPaul's Drag Race Down Under, where she placed 6th. She impersonated Courtney Love for the Snatch Game challenge.

Yuri competed on the sixth season of The Boulet Brothers' Dragula, where she placed 4th.

== Personal life ==
Yuri is based in Auckland.

== Filmography ==
=== Television ===
- RuPaul's Drag Race Down Under (season 2) - 6th Place & Miss Congeniality
- Bring Back My Girls (2024)
- The Boulet Brothers' Dragula (2024) - 4th Place
