= Matraka =

Mexican drag performer (born 1998)

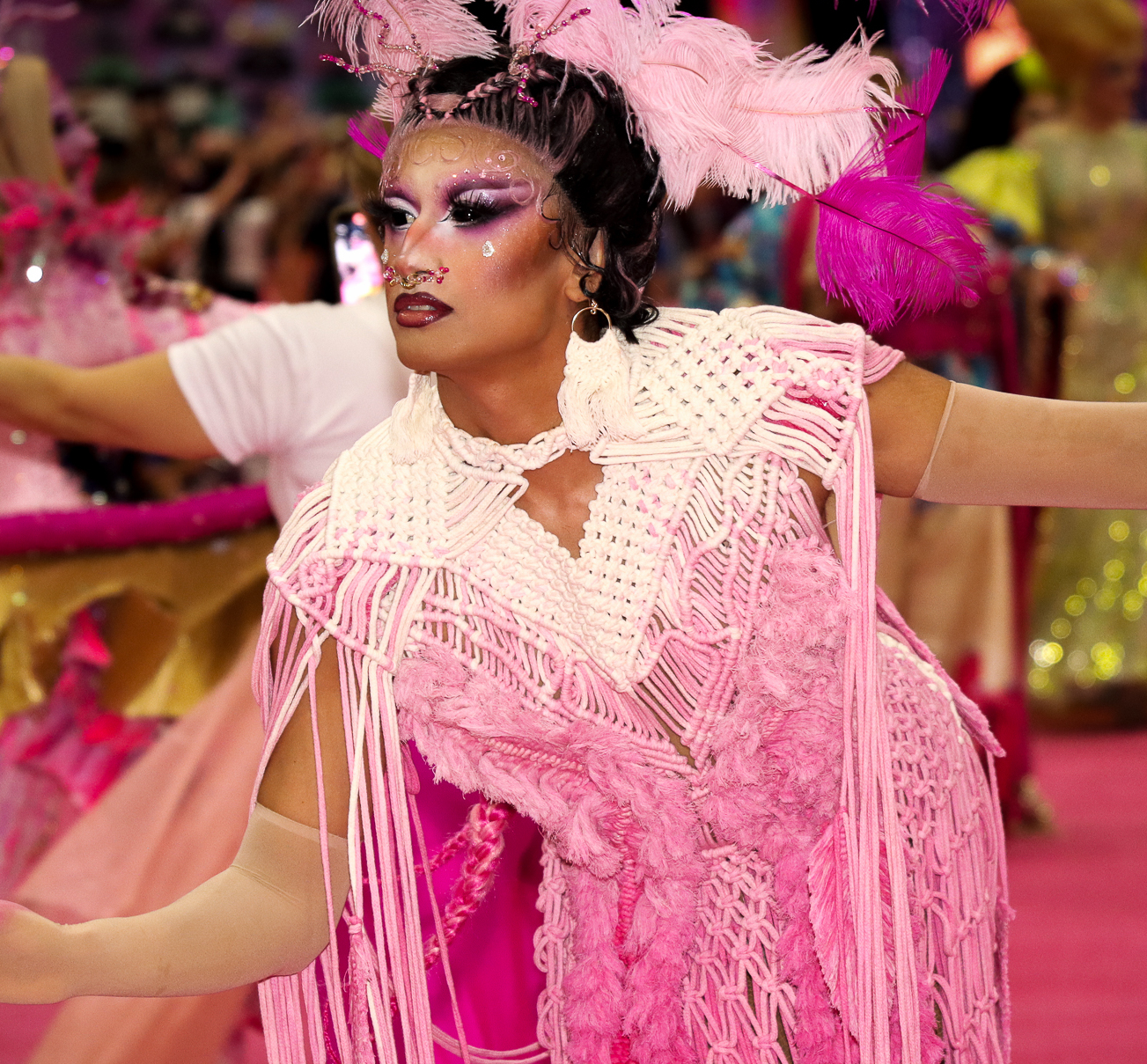
- Matraka at RuPaul's DragCon LA, 2024
- Born: Gerardo Reyes Toledo; March 4, 1998 (age 28); Purísima del Rincón, Mexico
- Occupation: Drag queen
- Television: Drag Race México

Matraka is the stage name of Gerardo Reyes Toledo, a Mexican drag queen and contestant on the first season of Drag Race Mexico, as well as Drag Race México: Latina Royale. Matraka is from Purísima del Rincón, Guanajato, and identifies as Indigenous Mexican.

== Early life ==
Matraka was born in Purísima del Rincón in 1998. His father is a cultural manager in Guanajuato and brought Reyes to Baile folklórico performances starting at an early age. In an interview with Periódico Correo, Matraka said, "From the age of 5, my father regularly took me to cultural events such as folkloric ballet meetings in Guanajuato. Notably, an event named Viva la Magia, later known as Viva la Banda, left a significant impression on me. These were international events, exposing me to diverse perspectives on art and culture." At university, Matraka majored in plastic arts but now works full-time doing drag performances. Matraka's name, which is a play on the word matraca, came from playing with friends in 2019.

== Career ==
Matraka began performing in 2019 in clubs and at festivals in Guanajuato. Her drag is defined by social criticism and inspired by Mexican culture. Matraka's outfits incorporate classic elements, such as sarapes and ruffled skirts. According to Matraka, her drag style "it has to do with Mexican culture." In 2023, Matraka competed on the first season of Drag Race México.

== Filmography ==
=== Television ===
Year	Title	Role	Notes	Ref
2023	Drag Race México	Contestant	Runner-up (Season 1, 12 episodes)	
2025	Bring Back My Girls	Herself	Guest (Season 4, episode 5)	
2026	Drag Race México: Latina Royale	Contestant	Runner-up (Season 1, 10 episodes)	

=== Music videos ===
Year	Title	Artist	Producer
2026	Kenia Os - Slay	Kenia Os	Sony Music Entertainment Music

== Discography ==
=== Featured albums ===
Year	Title	Artist	Producer
2023	Dragapulco Shore; El Rusical	The Cast of Drag Race Mexico	N/A

=== As a featured artist ===
Year	Title	Album	Producer
2023	Así Soy Yo (Versión Las Meximamis)	Non-album single	Omar Sosa Latournerie

== Awards and nominations ==
Year	Award	Category	Work	Result	Ref.
2023	Impulse LGBTIQ+ Awards	Drag del Año	Herself	Winner	
