= Sara Forever =

French drag performer

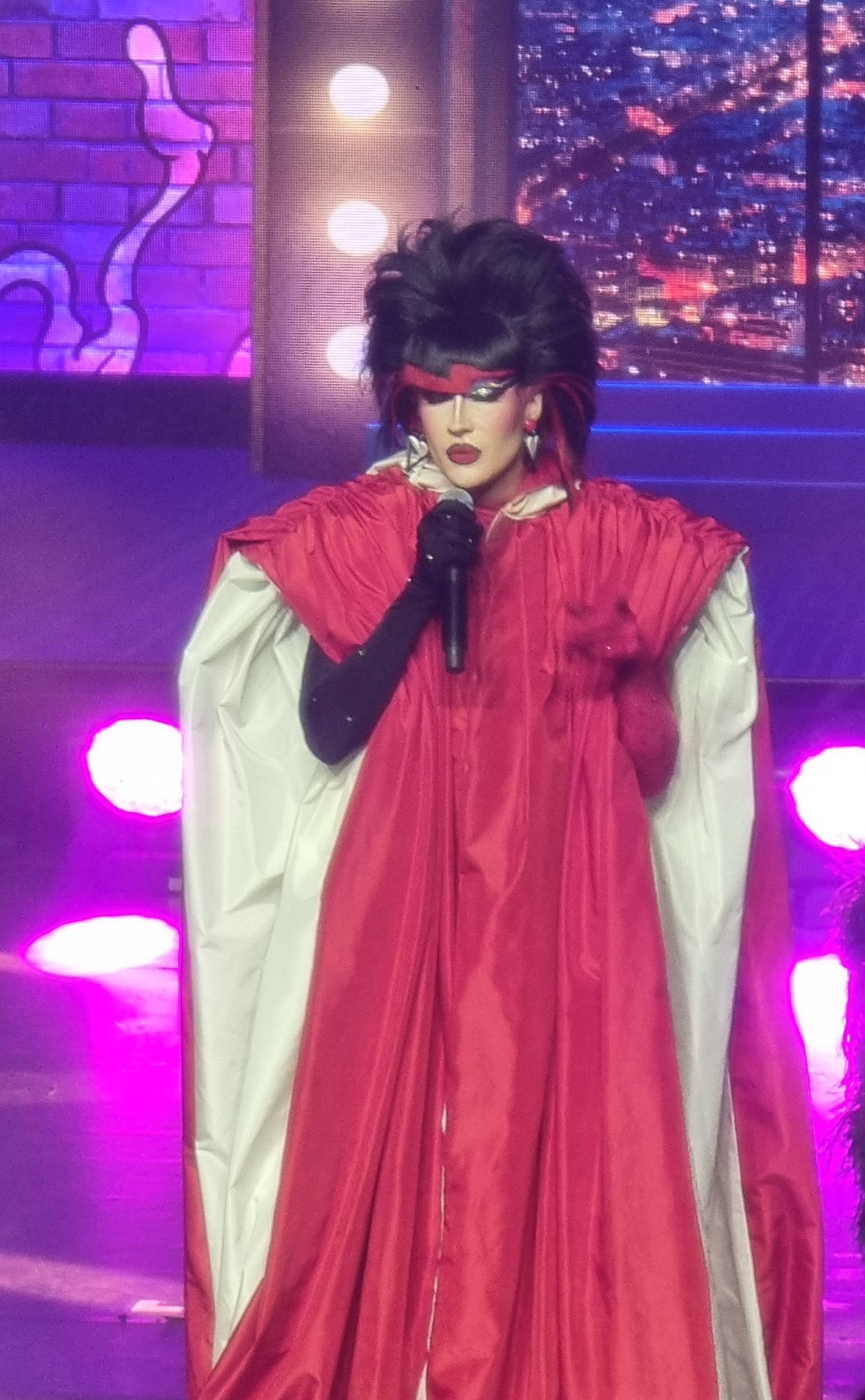
- Sara Forever in 2023
- Born: Matthieu Barbin
- Occupation: Drag queen
- Television: Drag Race France (season 2)

Sara Forever is the stage name of Matthieu Barbin, a French drag performer who competed on the second season of Drag Race France.

== Biography ==
Matthieu Barbin was born in 1989 and grew up in the Bordeaux suburb of Le Bouscat. An only child, his mother was a secretary and voluntarily enrolled him in reputable schools to further his education. His passion for singing and dancing began in elementary school.

From the age of 19, he trained with Jean-Claude Gallotta.

== Filmography ==
- Drag Race France
- Bring Back My Girls
