= Minnie Cooper =

Australian drag performer

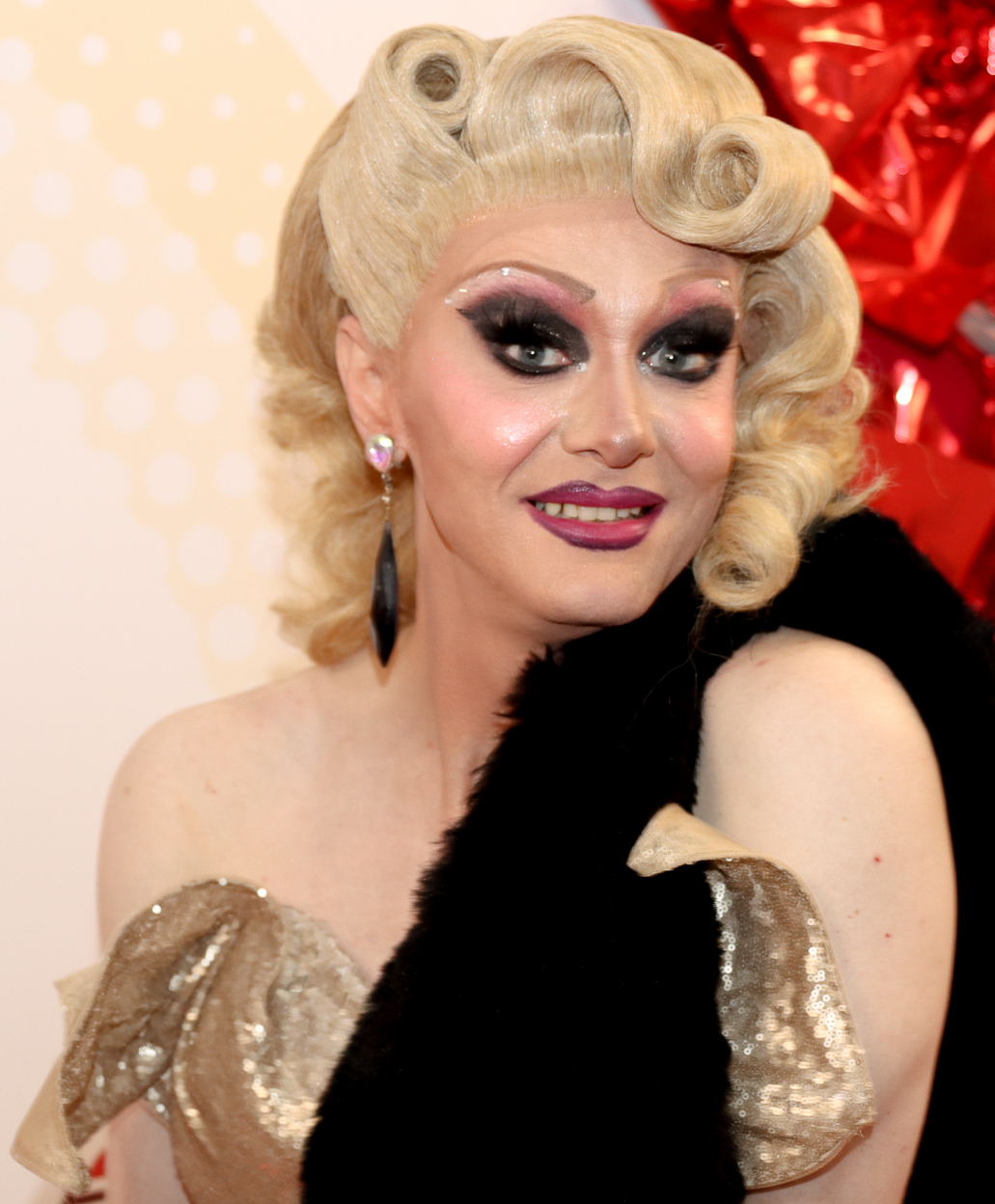
- Minnie Cooper at RuPaul's DragCon LA, 2023
- Born: Aaron Farley; Granville, Sydney, New South Wales, Australia
- Occupation: Drag queen
- Website: minniecoopersydneydrag.com

Minnie Cooper is the stage name of Aaron Farley, an Australian drag queen.

== Career ==
Farley was born and raised in Granville, Sydney. He started out as a chorus singer in musicals before performing in drag starting at the age of 31.

Minnie Cooper was a semifinalist on the eighth season of Australia's Got Talent in 2016. In 2018, she was featured on All Together Now and Celebrity Name Game Australia. She also appeared in season 4 of Jack Whitehall: Travels with My Father.

In 2018, Minnie Cooper starred in her own one-woman show, "From Chorus Boy to Leading Lady". She has performed in front of Cher at the 2018 Mardi Gras parade, and in front of Kylie Minogue in 2019. She has won numerous DIVA (Drag Industry Variety Awards), including Entertainer of the Year, Sydney's Favourite Drag Queen, and Choreographer of the Year.

In 2022, Minnie Cooper competed in the second season of RuPaul's Drag Race Down Under. She was eliminated in the fourth episode by Beverly Kills, after having landed in the bottom two for her impersonation of Ellen DeGeneres in the Snatch Game. During her time on the show, she had many arguments with other competitors, such as Beverly Kills and Pomara Fifth.

== Filmography ==
- RuPaul's Drag Race Down Under
- Bring Back My Girls (2024)
