= Aubrey Haive =

Australian drag performer

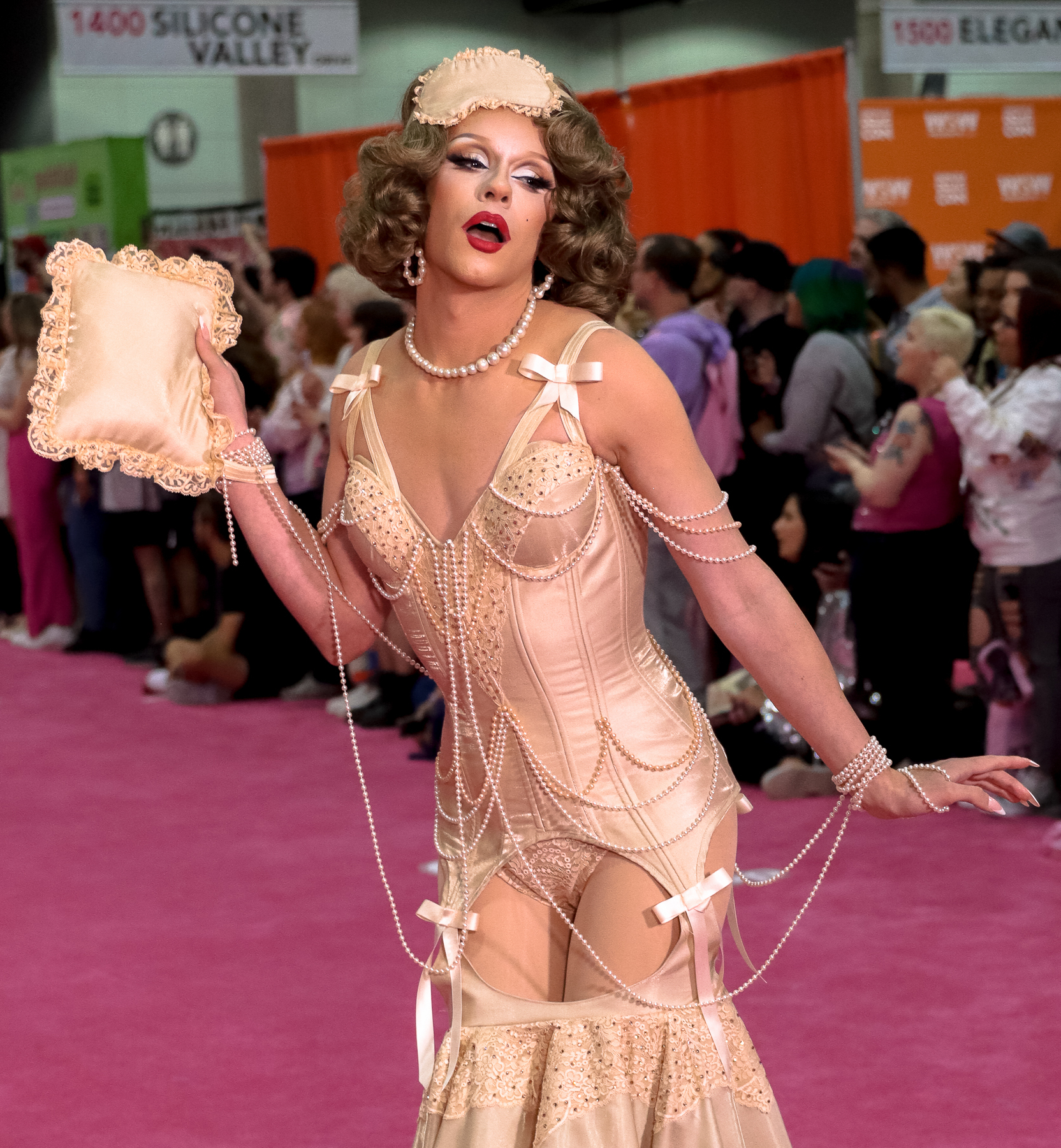
- Aubrey Haive at RuPaul's DragCon LA, 2023
- Born: Bailey Dunnage
- Television: RuPaul's Drag Race Down Under (season 2)
- Website: aubreyhaive.com

Bailey Dunnage, better known by the stage name Aubrey Haive, is a drag performer who competed on season 2 of RuPaul's Drag Race Down Under. Originally from Timaru, New Zealand, she is now based in Melbourne, Australia.

== Filmography ==
=== Television ===
- RuPaul's Drag Race Down Under (season 2)
- Bring Back My Girls (2024)

=== Commercial ===
- Specsavers

== Theatre ==
- ‘’Here You Come Again’’ (2025) (Hayes Theatre)
- ‘’Ride the Cyclone’’ (2024) (Hayes Theatre)
- ‘’RENT’’ (2023) (The Court Theatre)

== See also ==
- List of people from Melbourne
