= Rhys Tolhurst =

Australian singer-songwriter (born 1994)

- Birth name: Rhys Gregory Tolhurst
- Born: 14 June 1994 (age 31) Gold Coast, Australia,
- Origin: Cairns, Queensland, Australia
- Genres: Pop Music, Contemporary, pop,
- Occupation(s): Singer-songwriter, record producer
- Instrument(s): Vocals, piano/keyboards,
- Years active: 2012–present
- Labels: Unsigned

Rhys Gregory Tolhurst (born 14 June 1994) is an Australian singer-songwriter.

== Early life ==
Rhys Tolhurst was born in Gold Coast, Queensland, Australia on 14 June 1994. He was adopted when he was 6 weeks old and was raised in Cairns, Queensland where he spent his childhood. Rhys was an only child and attended Our Lady Help Of Christians Primary School and Saint Mary's Catholic College. He was then enrolled in Tertiary Education at the Queensland Conservatorium Griffith University.

== Career ==
Rhys was a Finalist on Australia's Got Talent in 2012. His first single 'Being Together' was released in 2016. The song was produced by Melbourne Music Director Dorian West. Rhys appeared on All Together Now in 2018. In 2019, Rhys released singles 'Traitor' and 'Paradise'. In 2020, Rhys has been writing & producing his own music. 'Keep Dreaming' is his first release which will be released on 21 May 2020. He has had performances in over 150 weddings ceremonies in Australia.
