= Australia's Got Talent season 8 =

Australia's Got Talent
- Season 8
- From L to R, host Hughes & judges Monk, Dickson, Osbourne, Perfect.
- Hosted by: Dave Hughes
- Judges: Eddie Perfect; Kelly Osbourne; Sophie Monk; Ian "Dicko" Dickson
- Winner: Fletcher Pilon

Release
- Original network: Nine Network
- Original release: 1 February – 14 March 2016

Season chronology
- ← Previous; Season 7 Next → Season 9

Australia's Got Talent is an Australian reality television show, based on the original UK series, to find new talent. Nine announced that the show would be returning in 2016 for an eighth season. It is the second season to air on Nine after it was axed in 2013. Auditions opened in September and October 2015. On 28 October 2015, it was announced that Kyle Sandilands, Geri Halliwell, Dawn French and Timomatic have been replaced with a new panel of judges, they are Ian "Dicko" Dickson, Sophie Monk, Kelly Osbourne and Eddie Perfect. Julia Morris did not return as host as she is committed to another show and was replaced by Dave Hughes as the host. For the first time, this season introduced the Golden Buzzer. The season premiered on 1 February 2016.

== Changes ==
=== Golden Buzzer ===
This series saw the introduction of the new golden buzzer. During the auditions, as well as the standard buzzers, there was a golden buzzer placed in the centre of the judges' desk. Each judge was allowed to press this buzzer only once, and it would send that auditionee straight through to the live semi-finals regardless of the opinions of the other three judges.

=== Wildcard ===
This season will see the introduction of a viewer-voted Wildcard entry to send one lucky performer directly to the Grand Finale. Contestants who are not taken through to the semi-final by the celebrity judges can be voted back into the finals by viewers as Wildcards.

== Semi-finalists ==
Key	Winner	Runner up	Finalist	Golden Buzzer	Wildcard

Participant	Genre	Act	Semi-final	Finished
Alysha Jones	Singing	Opera Singer	1	Semi-Finalist
Bosko & Honey	Singing	Singing Duo	2	Semi-Finalist
Callum The Heavy Metal Kid	Singing	Singer and Guitarist	4	Finalist
Carter	Dance	Dancer	2	Semi-Finalist
Chris Tamwoy	Singing	Guitarist and Singer	5	Runner-up
Erik The Dog	Variety	Novelty Act	3	Finalist
Equals	Dance	Dance Group	4	Finalist
Fletcher Pilon	Singing	Singer and Guitarist	5	Winner
Gentlemen of Deceit	Magic	Magicians	2	Finalist
Irma & Sisko	Animals	Dog Act	4	Semi-Finalist
Jan Van De Stool	Comedy	Comedian	4	Semi-Finalist
Jessie Daley	Magic	Magician	3	Semi-Finalist
King Social	Singing	Band	3	Runner-up
Matt McLaren	Singing	Singer and Pianist	2	Runner-up
Mick & Emma	Acrobatics	Acrobatic Duo	1	Semi-Finalist
Minnie Cooper & The Tiny Teeny Tappers	Singing	Drag Act & Tap Dancers	5	Semi-Finalist
NOA	Music	Rapper	5	Semi-Finalist
Pardeep Kumar	Dance	Dancer	1	Semi-Finalist
Phly Crew	Dance	Dance Group	1	Finalist
Raw & Rugged	Dance	Dance Group	N/A	Finalist
Rothomatic - Australia's LED Robot	Variety	Novelty Act	5	Semi-Finalist
Showko	Comedy	Ventriloquist	3	Semi-Finalist
Sisters Doll	Singing	Band	1	Runner-up
Subih Brothers	Singing	Band	4	Semi-Finalist
Sukhjit Kaur Khalsa	Variety	Spoken Word Poet	2	Semi-Finalist
Suzie Jay & Joe Ace	Singing	Singing Duo	3	Semi-Finalist
The Elliot Sisters	Singing	Singing Trio	2	Semi-Finalist
The Henry Twins	Dance	Dance Duo	3	Semi-Finalist
The Shake Man	Dance	Dancer	4	Semi-Finalist
TJ	Music	Drummer	5	Semi-Finalist
Violeta Bozanic	Singing	Singer and Pianist	1	Semi-Finalist

== Semi-finals Summary ==
Buzzed Out | Won Public Vote | Won Judges' Vote

=== Semi-final 1 (22 February) ===
Semi-Finalist	Order	Buzzes				Result
Semi-Finalist	Order	Dickson	Monk	Osbourne	Perfect	Result
Phly Crew	1					Advanced (Won Judges' Choice)
Violeta Bozanic	2					Eliminated
Mick & Emma	3					Eliminated
Pardeep Kumar	4					Eliminated
Sisters Doll	5					Advanced (Won Public Vote)
Alysha Jones	6					Eliminated

=== Semi-final 2 (28 February) ===
Semi-Finalist	Order	Buzzes				Result
Semi-Finalist	Order	Dickson	Monk	Osbourne	Perfect	Result
The Elliot Sisters	1					Eliminated
Carter	2					Eliminated
Gentlemen of Deceit	3					Advanced (Won Judges' Choice)
Bosko & Honey	4					Eliminated
Sukhjit Kaur Khalsa	5					Eliminated
Matt McLaren	6					Advanced (Won Public Vote)

=== Semi-final 3 (29 February) ===
Semi-Finalist	Order	Buzzes				Result
Semi-Finalist	Order	Dickson	Monk	Osbourne	Perfect	Result
The Henry Twins	1					Eliminated
Jessie Daley	2					Eliminated
Susie Jay & Joe Ace	3					Eliminated
King Social	4					Advanced (Won Public Vote)
Showko	5					Eliminated
Erik The Dog	6					Advanced (Won Judges' Choice)

=== Semi-final 4 (6 March) ===
Semi-Finalist	Order	Buzzes				Result
Semi-Finalist	Order	Dickson	Monk	Osbourne	Perfect	Result
Irma & Sisko	1					Eliminated
Subih Brothers	2					Eliminated
The Shake Man	3					Eliminated
Callum The Heavy Metal Kid	4					Advanced (Won Public Vote)
Jan Van De Stool	5					Eliminated
Equals	6					Advanced (Won Judges' Choice)

=== Semi-final 5 (7 March) ===
Semi-Finalist	Order	Buzzes				Result
Semi-Finalist	Order	Dickson	Monk	Osbourne	Perfect	Result
Minnie Cooper & The Tiny Teeny Tappers	1					Eliminated
TJ	2					Eliminated
NOA	3					Eliminated
Chris Tamwoy	4					Advanced (Won Public Vote)
Rothomatic – Australia's LED Robot	5					Eliminated
Fletcher Pilon	6					Advanced (Won Judges' Choice)

== Finals Summary ==
=== Final – Top 11 (13 March) ===
The top 11, (including Raw & Rugged who received the Judges' wildcard), performed once more for a spot in the Grand Finale. An audience vote followed after the show and only five acts returned for the Grand Finale with new performances.

Finalist	Order	Result
Equals	1	Eliminated
Callum The Heavy Metal Kid	2	Eliminated
King Social	3	Advanced
Gentlemen of Deceit	4	Eliminated
Matt McLaren	5	Advanced
Raw & Rugged	6	Eliminated
Erik The Dog	7	Eliminated
Chris Tamwoy	8	Advanced
Phly Crew	9	Eliminated
Fletcher Pilon	10	Advanced
Sisters Doll	11	Advanced

=== Grand Finale (14 March) ===
Guest Judge: Jack Black

Guest performer: Cosentino

Finalist	Order	Result
Chris Tamwoy	1	Eliminated
King Social	2	Eliminated
Matt McLaren	3	Eliminated
Sisters Doll	4	Eliminated
Fletcher Pilon	5	Winner

== Ratings ==
Episode		Original airdate	Timeslot	Viewers (millions)	Nightly rank	Source
1	"Auditions"	1 February 2016	Monday; 7:30 pm	0.865	10	
2	"Auditions"	7 February 2016	Sunday; 7:00 pm	0.914	6	
3	"Auditions"	8 February 2016	Monday; 7:30 pm	0.896	9	
4	"Auditions"	14 February 2016	Sunday; 7:00 pm	0.740	9	
5	"Auditions"	15 February 2016	Monday; 7:30 pm	0.775	10	
6	"Auditions"	21 February 2016	Sunday; 7:00 pm	0.633	9	
7	"Semifinals"	22 February 2016	Monday; 7:30 pm	0.703	14	
8	"Semifinals"	28 February 2016	Sunday; 8:00 pm	0.748	9	
9	"Semifinals"	29 February 2016	Monday; 7:30 pm	0.671	13	
10	"Semifinals"	6 March 2016	Sunday; 8:00 pm	0.630	13	
11	"Semifinals"	7 March 2016	Monday; 7:30 pm	0.594	19	
12	"Final – Top 11"	13 March 2016	Sunday; 8:00 pm	0.599	11	
13	"Grand Finale – Top 5" "Winner Announced"	14 March 2016	Monday; 7:30 pm	0.785 0.961	12 7	
