= RuPaul's Drag Race Down Under season 2 =

2022 season of RuPaul's Drag Race Down Under

RuPaul's Drag Race Down Under
- Season 2
- Promotional poster for season two
- Hosted by: RuPaul
- Judges: RuPaul; Michelle Visage; Rhys Nicholson
- No. of contestants: 10
- Winner: Spankie Jackzon
- Runners-up: Hannah Conda; Kween Kong
- No. of episodes: 8

Release
- Original network: Stan (AU); TVNZ 2 & TVNZ+ (NZ); BBC Three (UK); WOW Presents Plus (International)
- Original release: 30 July – 17 September 2022

Season chronology
- ← Previous; Season 1 Next → Season 3

The second season of RuPaul's Drag Race Down Under premiered on 30 July 2022 and concluded on 17 September 2022. The cast was announced via TVNZ's Instagram account and a live interview with Kween Kong on TVNZ's Breakfast show on 7 July 2022.

Following the death of Queen Elizabeth II on 8 September 2022, BBC Three delayed the final two episodes in the United Kingdom until after the period of national mourning. The winner of the second season of RuPaul's Drag Race Down Under was Spankie Jackzon, with Hannah Conda and Kween Kong as runners-up.

== Background ==
The second season was confirmed and casting was opened on 9 September 2021. Casting closed on 5 October. The season filmed in January and February 2022. Season 1 judges Michelle Visage and Rhys Nicholson were spotted in south Auckland, leading to speculation that both would be returning to judge season 2.

Spankie Jackzon previously appeared on season 2 of House of Drag, a series hosted and judged by Drag Race Down Under Season 1 contestants Anita Wigl'it and Kita Mean, winning the season over runner-up Elektra Shock.

== Contestants ==
Ages, names, and cities stated are at time of filming.

Contestants of RuPaul's Drag Race Down Under season 2 and their backgrounds
Contestant	Age	Hometown	Outcome
Spankie Jackzon	37	Palmerston North, New Zealand	Winner
Hannah Conda	30	Sydney, Australia	Runners-up
Kween Kong	29	Adelaide, Australia	Runners-up
Molly Poppinz	30	Newcastle, Australia	4th place
Beverly Kills	21	Brisbane, Australia	5th place
Yuri Guaii	25	Auckland, New Zealand	6th place
Minnie Cooper	50	Sydney, Australia	7th place
Pomara Fifth	28	Camden, Australia	8th place
Aubrey Haive	25	Timaru, New Zealand	9th place
Faúx Fúr	27	Sydney, Australia	10th place

== Contestant progress ==
Legend:

Spankie Jackzon won RuPaul's Drag Race Down Under season 2.
Hannah Conda and Kween Kong were the runners-up.
WIN indicates that the contestant won the challenge.
SAFE indicates that the contestant was declared safe by the judges.
BTM (Bottom) indicates that the contestant was up for elimination.
ELIM (Eliminated) indicates that the contestant was eliminated.

Contestants progress with placements in each episode
Contestant	Episode							
Contestant	1	2	3	4	5	6	7	8
Spankie Jackzon	BTM	WIN	WIN	SAFE	WIN	SAFE	SAFE	Winner
Hannah Conda	SAFE	SAFE	SAFE	WIN	WIN	WIN	BTM	Runner-up
Kween Kong	SAFE	BTM	SAFE	SAFE	WIN	BTM	WIN	Runner-up
Molly Poppinz	WIN	SAFE	SAFE	SAFE	BTM	SAFE	ELIM	
Beverly Kills	SAFE	SAFE	BTM	BTM	SAFE	ELIM		
Yuri Guaii	SAFE	SAFE	WIN	SAFE	ELIM			
Minnie Cooper	SAFE	SAFE	SAFE	ELIM				
Pomara Fifth	SAFE	SAFE	ELIM					
Aubrey Haive	SAFE	ELIM						
Faúx Fúr	ELIM							

== Lip syncs ==
Legend:

The contestant won the Lip Sync for the Crown and was declared the winner of the season.
The contestant was eliminated after their first time in the bottom.
The contestant was eliminated after their second time in the bottom.
The contestant was eliminated after their third time in the bottom.

Episode	Contestants			Song	Eliminated
1	Faúx Fúr	vs.	Spankie Jackzon	"Get Outta My Way" (Kylie Minogue)	Faúx Fúr
2	Aubrey Haive	vs.	Kween Kong	"I Touch Myself" (Divinyls)	Aubrey Haive
3	Beverly Kills	vs.	Pomara Fifth	"Starstruck" (Years & Years ft. Kylie Minogue)	Pomara Fifth
4	Beverly Kills	vs.	Minnie Cooper	"Dance in the Dark" (Lady Gaga)	Minnie Cooper
5	Molly Poppinz	vs.	Yuri Guaii	"Chains (S&M Remix)" (Tina Arena)	Yuri Guaii
6	Beverly Kills	vs.	Kween Kong	"The Beginning" (RuPaul)	Beverly Kills
7	Hannah Conda	vs.	Molly Poppinz	"Heartbreak in This City" (Steps, Michelle Visage)	Molly Poppinz
Episode	Contestants			Song	Winner
8	Hannah Conda vs. Kween Kong vs. Spankie Jackzon			"Wow" (Kylie Minogue)	Spankie Jackzon

== Guest judges ==
Listed in chronological order:

- Lucy Lawless, New Zealand actress in theatre, television and film
- Urzila Carlson, South African–New Zealand comedian and actress

=== Special guests ===
Guests who appeared in episodes, but did not judge on the main stage.

Episode 1

- Bindi Irwin, Australian television personality, conservationist, zookeeper and actress
- Robert Irwin, Australian television personality, conservationist, zookeeper and actor

Episode 3

- Chris Parker, New Zealand actor, comedian, LGBTQI+ advocate and reality personality

Episode 4

- Raven, runner-up of both RuPaul's Drag Race Season 2 and All Stars Season 1

Episode 5

- Sophie Monk, Australian singer, actress, model and television personality

Episode 6

- Samantha Harris, Australian model
- Suzanne Paul, New Zealand infomercial hostess and television host

Episode 7

- Murray Bartlett, Australian actor
- Norvina, president of Anastasia Beverly Hills

Episode 8

- Delta Goodrem, Australian singer and actress
- Elektra Shock, dancer, choreographer and judge on Dancing with the Stars: New Zealand Season 9, a contestant on RuPaul's Drag Race Down Under Season 1 and runner-up on House of Drag Season 2
- Kita Mean, winner of RuPaul's Drag Race Down Under Season 1 and co-host and judge of House of Drag

== Episodes ==
No. overall	No. in season	Title	Original release date
9	1	"Grand Opening"	30 July 2022
Ten new queens enter the werkroom. For the first mini-challenge, the queens do a sausage sizzle photoshoot. Minnie Cooper wins the mini-challenge. For the main challenge, the queens create an outfit made from locally sourced natural materials. On the runway, category is Down Under, Naturally. Hannah Conda, Molly Poppinz and Yuri Guaii receive positive critiques, with Molly Poppinz winning the challenge. Faúx Fúr, Kween Kong and Spankie Jackzon receive negative critiques, with Kween Kong being safe. Faúx Fúr and Spankie Jackzon lip-sync to "Get Outta My Way" by Kylie Minogue. Spankie Jackzon wins the lip-sync and Faúx Fúr is the first queen to sashay away.: Mini-Challenge: Sausage sizzle photoshoot; Mini-Challenge Winner: Minnie Cooper; Main Challenge: Create an outfit made from locally sourced natural materials; Runway Theme: Down Under, Naturally; Challenge Winner: Molly Poppinz; Challenge Prize: A custom prosthetic makeover courtesy of BodyFX; Bottom Two: Faúx Fúr and Spankie Jackzon; Lip-Sync Song: "Get Outta My Way" by Kylie Minogue; Eliminated: Faúx Fúr; Farewell Message: "Sisters forever. THE LOUD NIECE DIES. AAHHHHH!!! xoxo Faúx"
10	2	"Cagey Queens"	6 August 2022
For this week's main challenge, the queens team up and perform in a gritty prison drama called "Caged Queens".: Team 1: Aubrey Haive, Hannah Conda, Minnie Cooper and Pomara Fifth; Team 2: Beverly Kills, Kween Kong, Molly Poppinz, Spankie Jackzon and Yuri Guaii; On the runway, category is Fly Girls: Insects on the Runway. Hannah Conda, Minnie Cooper and Spankie Jackzon receive positive critiques, with Spankie Jackzon winning the challenge. Aubrey Haive, Kween Kong and Yuri Guaii receive negative critiques, with Yuri Guaii being safe. Aubrey Haive and Kween Kong lip-sync to . Kween Kong wins the lip-sync and Aubrey Haive sashays away.: Guest Judge: Lucy Lawless; Main Challenge: In teams, perform in a gritty prison drama called "Caged Queens"; Runway Theme: Fly Girls: Insects on the Runway; Challenge Winner: Spankie Jackzon; Challenge Prize: 4 night stay at a Sofitel property of choice in Australia or New Zealand from Sofitel Viaduct Auckland Harbour; Bottom Two: Aubrey Haive and Kween Kong; Lip-Sync Song: "I Touch Myself" by Divinyls; Eliminated: Aubrey Haive; Farewell Message: "Stay fag'edelic Babbies! Can't wait to see you all again! Love Aubrey (Audrey) Haive! xxx"
11	3	"Bottomless Brunch"	13 August 2022
For this week's mini-challenge, the queens play a guessing game with the pit crew called "Tools of the Trade". Molly Poppinz wins the mini-challenge. For the main challenge, the queens pair up and host a Down Under Drag Brunch.: Beverly Kills and Pomara Fifth; Hannah Conda and Molly Poppinz; Kween Kong and Minnie Cooper; Spankie Jackzon and Yuri Guaii; On the runway, category is Red For Filth. Kween Kong, Minnie Cooper, Spankie Jackzon and Yuri Guaii receive positive critiques, with Spankie Jackzon and Yuri Guaii both winning the challenge. Beverly Kills, Hannah Conda, Molly Poppinz and Pomara Fifth receive negative critiques, with Hannah Conda and Molly Poppinz being safe. Beverly Kills and Pomara Fifth lip-sync to "Starstruck" by Years & Years ft. Kylie Minogue. Beverly Kills wins the lip-sync and Pomara Fifth sashays away.: Guest Judge: Urzila Carlson; Mini-Challenge: Tools of the Trade; Mini-Challenge Winner: Molly Poppinz; Mini-Challenge Prize: A $5,000 cash tip; Main Challenge: In pairs, host a Down Under Drag Brunch; Runway Theme: Red For Filth; Challenge Winners: Spankie Jackzon and Yuri Guaii; Challenge Prize: A $5,000 cash tip, courtesy of The Star, Sydney; Bottom Two: Beverly Kills and Pomara Fifth; Lip-Sync Song: "Starstruck" by Years & Years ft. Kylie Minogue; Eliminated: Pomara Fifth; Farewell Message: "To my delicious pack of cunts: I'm going to miss you all so so so much. Ps: Watch your delivery Minnie. Love, Pomara"
12	4	"Snatch Game"	20 August 2022
For this week's main challenge, the queens play the Snatch Game. Raven and Rhys Nicholson star as the celebrity contestants. The cast consisted of: Beverly Kills as Val Garland; Hannah Conda as Liza Minnelli; Kween Kong as NeNe Leakes; Minnie Cooper as Ellen DeGeneres; Molly Poppinz as Orville Peck; Spankie Jackzon as Dame Edna Everage; Yuri Guaii as Courtney Love; On the runway, category is Cirque du So-Gay. Hannah Conda, Spankie Jackzon and Yuri Guaii receive positive critiques, with Hannah Conda winning the challenge. Beverly Kills, Minnie Cooper and Molly Poppinz receive negative critiques, with Molly Poppinz being safe. Beverly Kills and Minnie Cooper lip-sync to "Dance in the Dark" by Lady Gaga. Beverly Kills wins the lip-sync and Minnie Cooper sashays away: Main Challenge: Snatch Game; Runway Theme: Cirque du So-Gay; Challenge Winner: Hannah Conda; Challenge Prize: A $5,000 cash tip courtesy of The Star, Sydney; Bottom Two: Beverly Kills and Minnie Cooper; Lip-Sync Song: "Dance in the Dark" by Lady Gaga; Eliminated: Minnie Cooper; Farewell Message: "Thank you Sparky Kong Yuri for being so kind #byo Tk coops xx"
13	5	"Bosom Buddies"	27 August 2022
For this week's mini-challenge, the queens read each other to filth. Kween Kong wins the mini-challenge. For the main challenge, the queens write, record, and perform verses to "Bosom Buddies".: Team BAB'Z: Hannah Conda, Kween Kong and Spankie Jackzon; Team The Hung Divas: Beverly Kills, Molly Poppinz and Yuri Guaii; On the runway, category is Belts, Buckles and Chains. Team BAB'Z is the winning team, with Hannah Conda, Kween Kong and Spankie Jackzon all winning the challenge. Team The Hung Divas is the losing team. Molly Poppinz and Yuri Guaii receive negative critiques, and are announced as the bottom two. They lip-sync to "Chains (S&M Remix)" by Tina Arena. Molly Poppinz wins the lip-sync and Yuri Guaii sashays away.: Mini-Challenge: Reading is Fundamental; Mini-Challenge Winner: Kween Kong; Main Challenge: Write, record, and perform verses to "Bosom Buddies"; Runway Theme: Belts, Buckles and Chains; Challenge Winners: Hannah Conda, Kween Kong and Spankie Jackzon; Challenge Prize: A $2,000 cash tip and a year supply of tights; Bottom Two: Molly Poppinz and Yuri Guaii; Lip-Sync Song: "Chains (S&M Remix)" by Tina Arena; Eliminated: Yuri Guaii; Farewell Message: "Live fast eat ass. Boo. xoxo Trish, Yuri. Spankie 4 the win!"
14	6	"Hometown Hunnies"	3 September 2022
For this week's main challenge, the queens create a tourism campaign for their hometowns.: Beverly Kills chose Gold Coast, Queensland; Hannah Conda chose Perth, Western Australia; Kween Kong chose Māngere, South Auckland; Molly Poppinz chose Newcastle, New South Wales; Spankie Jackzon chose Palmerston North, New Zealand; On the runway, category is Swimsuit Edition. Hannah Conda, Molly Poppinz and Spankie Jackzon receive positive critiques, with Hannah Conda winning the challenge. Beverly Kills and Kween Kong receive negative critiques and are announced as the bottom two. They lip-sync to "The Beginning" by RuPaul. Kween Kong wins the lip-sync and Beverly Kills sashays away.: Main Challenge: Create a tourism campaign for their hometowns; Runway Theme: Swimsuit Edition; Challenge Winner: Hannah Conda; Challenge Prize: A $2,000 gift card courtesy of Shoe Me; Bottom Two: Beverly Kills and Kween Kong; Lip-Sync Song: "The Beginning" by RuPaul; Eliminated: Beverly Kills; Farewell Message: "Thank you for the love, friendship and memories. You're all bastards. KILLS xx P.S. #TeamSpankie"
15	7	"Drag Family Makeover"	10 September 2022
For this week's main challenge, the queens makeover a family of men. On the runway, category is Opposites Attract. Kween Kong and Spankie Jackzon receive positive critiques, with Kween Kong winning the challenge. Hannah Conda and Molly Poppinz receive negative critiques and are announced as the bottom two. They lip-sync to "Heartbreak in This City" by Steps and Michelle Visage. Hannah Conda wins the lip-sync and Molly Poppinz sashays away.: Main Challenge: Makeover a family of men; Runway Theme: Opposites Attract; Challenge Winner: Kween Kong; Challenge Prize: A $5,000 cash tip courtesy of Anastasia Beverly Hills; Bottom Two: Hannah Conda and Molly Poppinz; Lip-Sync Song: "Heartbreak in This City" by Steps and Michelle Visage; Eliminated: Molly Poppinz; Farewell Message: "Bye Molez. She just didn't pop in, she popped off. ♡ Molly. #Imaheelerbaby"
16	8	"Grand Finale"	17 September 2022
For the final challenge of the season, the queens write, record and perform verses to RuPaul's song "Who Is She" On the runway, category is Grand Finale Eleganza Extravaganza. The three finalists are told that they will be lip-syncing to "Wow" by Kylie Minogue. It is announced that Spankie Jackzon is the winner, leaving Hannah Conda and Kween Kong as the runners-up.: Main Challenge: Write, record and perform their own verses to RuPaul's song "Who Is She"; Runway Theme: Grand Finale Eleganza Extravaganza; Lip-Sync Song: "Wow" by Kylie Minogue; Runners-up: Hannah Conda and Kween Kong; Winner of RuPaul's Drag Race Down Under Season Two: Spankie Jackzon
