= Fletcher Pilon =

- Born: 6 April 2001 (age 25); Wamberal, New South Wales, Australia
- Genres: Blues, acoustic
- Instruments: Vocals and guitar
- Years active: 2014–present
- Label: Sony Music Australia
- Website: http://fletcherpilon.com

Fletcher Kent Pilon (born 6 April 2001) is an Australian acoustic singer and songwriter, known for winning the eighth season of Australia's Got Talent in March 2016. Fletcher has previously appeared on shows such as The Voice Kids, Nickelodeon's SlimeFest and BalconyTVSydney. Before appearing on various TV series, he played at markets and restaurants. Fletcher writes his own songs. He auditioned for Australia's Got Talent, shown during Auditions 4 on 14 February 2016, and won the season on 14 March 2016.

== Life and career ==
=== 2014–2015 ===
In 2014, Fletcher appeared on the Australian version of The Voice Kids in the fifth blind auditions. He played the song "Flying with the King" by Lee Kernaghan and had all three judges turn but chose The Madden Brothers as his coach. In the battle round, he sang "Let Her Go" by Passenger with two other contestants, but did not win the round and was eliminated.

In August 2015, 10-year-old Banjo Pilon, Fletcher's brother, was hit by a car while skateboarding and died. After his death, Fletcher wrote the song "Infinite Child" in honour of his brother.

Fletcher released his first EP on 10 December 2015 on iTunes. The EP also includes "Infinite Child".

Banjo EP tracks
#	Song	Length
1	"Infinite Child"	3:32
2	"Be My"	4:22
3	"Peace"	4:59
4	"Everything's Gonna Be Fine"	2:51
5	"Hoochie Coochie Man"	3:25

=== 2016– ===
In 2016 Fletcher decided to audition for Australia's Got Talent with the song "Infinite Child". He received an emotional appraisal by all judges and made it through to the Grand Finale. He reprised the song during the Grand Finale and was acclaimed by the judges, audience and guest judge Jack Black. A voting line opened for five minutes to the public to vote for the winner and Fletcher received the most votes, leading him to win the Grand Finale and receive a prize of $250,000.

On 25 February 2017, Fletcher released a single named 'Water' on Sony Music Australia.

In 2019 Fletcher released a single named 'Paperback' on 22 February, and a single named 'One More' on 22 March. Both songs were included on the 'Thoughts' EP released on 5 April.

In March 2024 Fletcher toured supporting Newton Faulkner in Australia under the name Fletcher Kent. Fletcher announced at The Gov, Adelaide he would start recording an album by the end of March.

Fletcher released the singles "I'll Be" on 15 November 2024 and "Are You Ready" on 31 January 2025.
