= Hannah Conda =

Drag performer

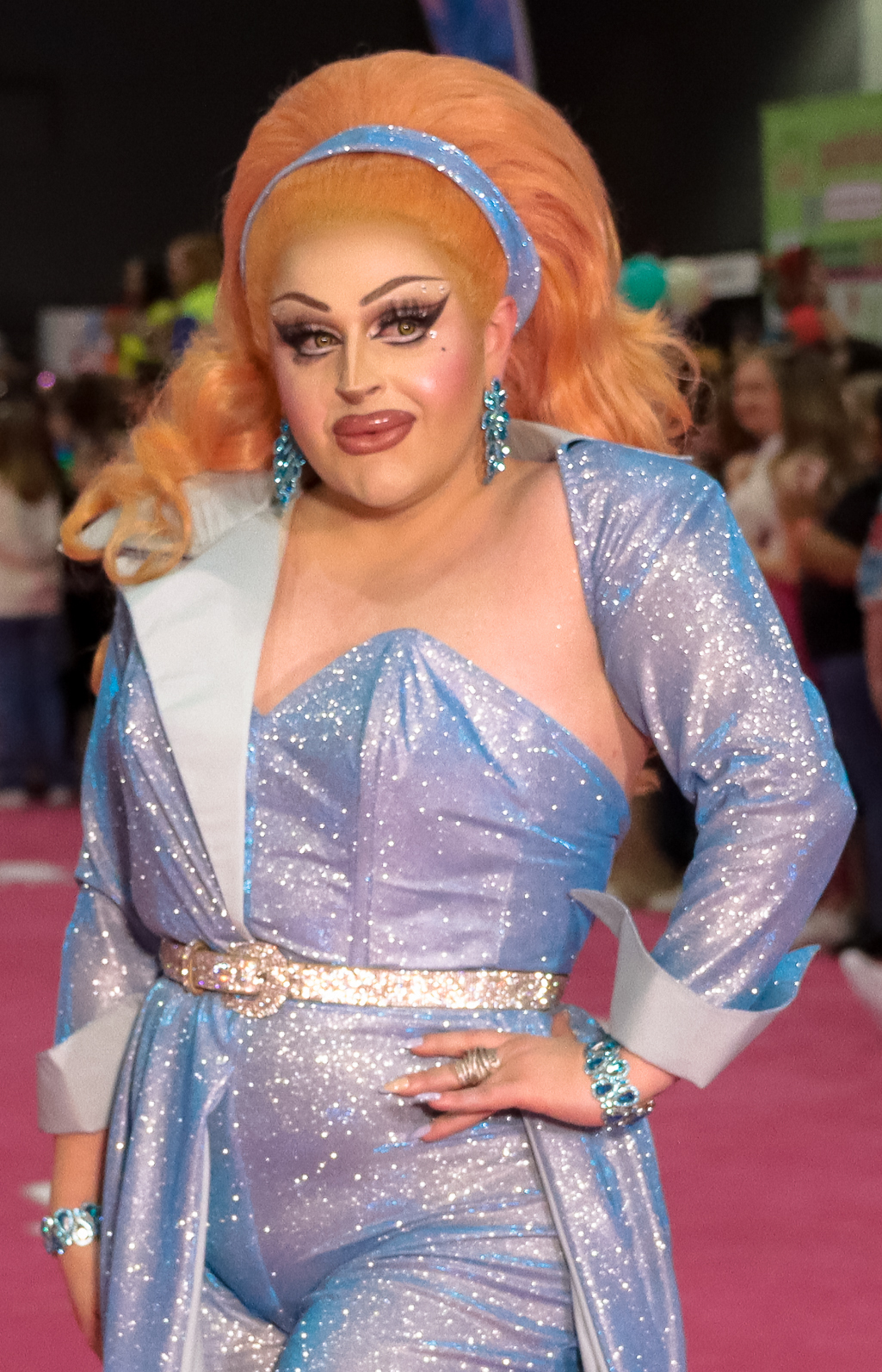
- Hannah Conda at RuPaul's DragCon LA, 2023
- Born: Chris Collins; Perth, Western Australia, Australia
- Occupation: Drag queen
- Website: hannahconda.com

Chris Collins, better known by his stage name Hannah Conda, is an Australian drag performer most known for competing on the second season of RuPaul's Drag Race Down Under, where she placed runner-up, and the second series of RuPaul's Drag Race: UK vs. the World, where she also placed runner-up.

== Personal life ==
Collins grew up in Perth. He was raised Catholic and seriously considered becoming a priest, having attended a Catholic high school where he was a Eucharistic minister. He came out as gay in year 11. He uses both she/her and he/him pronouns. His stage name is derived from a drunk Irish man who called him an anaconda.

Collins relocated from Perth to Sydney.

== Filmography ==
Year	Title	Role	Notes
2022	RuPaul's Drag Race Down Under	Contestant	Season 2, 8 episodes
2024	RuPaul's Drag Race: UK vs. the World	Contestant	Series 2
2024	Bring Back My Girls	Herself	Season 4; episode 3
