= Matt Tarrant =

Australian magician and mentalist

- Born: Matthew Tarrant; 18 April 1987 (age 39)
- Education: Brighton Secondary School
- Occupations: Magician; mentalist
- Years active: 2006–present
- Television: Australian Survivor; Australia's Got Talent
- Website: matt-tarrant.com

Matt Tarrant (born 18 April 1987) is an Australian magician and mentalist known for his touring stage shows and as a contestant on Australian Survivor.

== Early life ==
Tarrant grew up in Adelaide, South Australia and studied at Brighton Secondary School from 2000 to 2004.

== Career ==
Tarrant began performing at the age of 18 and established his career at the Adelaide Fringe Festival, winning the People's Choice of the Adelaide Fringe award for five years consecutively. His debut solo show in 2016, Honestly Dishonest, received generally positive reviews and won the Best Magic awards in 2016 and 2017 at the festival's weekly awards. Deception ran for an entire season at the Adelaide Fringe 2014 with his performing partner Vinh Giang.

In 2017, Tarrant toured Australia, starting with the Fringe World Festival in Perth, followed by the Adelaide Fringe Festival. Tarrant won the Adelaide Fringe Pick Of the Fringe award in 2019, one of 29 prizes awarded at the closing night ceremony. In January 2023, Tarrant became a board member of the Adelaide Fringe Foundation, which donated grants to artists and disadvantaged communities.

== Television appearances ==
In 2016, Tarrant appeared on the third season of Australian Survivor, which was the first series of the Network Ten iteration of the show, finishing in fifth place.

In 2022, he competed on the tenth season of Australia's Got Talent and was eliminated as a semi-finalist.

== Personal life ==
An avid Port Adelaide Football Club supporter, Tarrant became an official celebrity ambassador for the club in 2014.

Tarrant is also an Ambassador for South Australian charities Hutt St Centre and Barkuma.
