= Australia's Got Talent season 10 =

Australia's Got Talent
- Season 10
- Hosted by: Ricki-Lee Coulter
- Judges: Shane Jacobson; Kate Ritchie; Alesha Dixon; David Walliams
- Winner: Acromazing

Release
- Original network: Seven Network
- Original release: 9 October – 20 November 2022

Season chronology
- ← Previous; Season 9

Australia's Got Talent is an Australian reality television show, based on the original UK series, to find new talent. Seven Network announced that the show would be returning to their network in 2020 for its tenth season, however due to numerous COVID-19 restrictions, it had been pushed back until 2022. It had previously aired on Seven for six seasons from 2007 to 2012, and on the Nine Network for two seasons in 2013 and 2016, before returning to Seven in 2019. The judging panel consists of Shane Jacobson, Kate Ritchie, and Britain’s Got Talent judges David Walliams and Alesha Dixon. Ricki-Lee Coulter returned as host.

== Production ==
Season 10 was originally scheduled to air in 2020, with filming set to commence in March 2020. The Seven Network announced a judging panel of Shane Jacobson, Manu Feildel and new judges Sonia Kruger and Olympia Valance with returning host Ricki-Lee Coulter. Production was however halted due to COVID-19 restrictions.

It was then confirmed that season 10 would air in 2021. In June 2021, Seven announced a new judging panel featuring Shane Jacobson with new judges Neil Patrick Harris, Alesha Dixon and Kate Ritchie. However, due to COVID-19 restrictions in Sydney the season was postponed once again. During Seven’s annual upfronts, it was confirmed the series will air in 2022.

Season 10 was confirmed to air in 2022. The judging panel consists of Jacobson, Kate Ritchie, and Britain’s Got Talent judges David Walliams and Alesha Dixon. Ricki-Lee Coulter returned as host.

The season was filmed during June and July 2022. Auditions took place at the Sydney Coliseum Theatre, while the finals were filmed at the Riverside Theatre.

== Semi-finalists ==
Key	Winner	Runner-up	Finalist	Golden Buzzer

Participant	Genre	Act	Semi-final	Result
Acromazing	Acrobatics	Acrobatic Group	2	Winner
Bir Khalsa	Danger	Danger Group	2	Eliminated
Breanna	Singing	Singer	2	Eliminated
Elliot Loney	Comedy	Impressionist	1	Eliminated
Emo Majok	Comedy	Comedian	2	Finalist
Loretta's Poodles	Animals	Dog Act	1	Eliminated
Lucy Williamson	Singing	Singer	2	Eliminated
Matt Tarrant	Magic	Magician	2	Eliminated
Messoudi Brothers	Acrobatics	Acrobat Trio	2	Eliminated
Oleg	Acrobatics	Aerialist	2	Finalist
Ramadhani Brothers	Acrobatics	Acrobat Duo	1	Finalist
Sienna Katelyn	Singing	Singer	1	Finalist
Sydney Male Choir	Singing	Choir	1	Eliminated
Ukraine Dancers	Dance	Dance Duo	1	Eliminated
Walison Muh	Comedy	Comedian	1	Finalist
Wolfpack	Dance	Dance Group	1	Eliminated

== Semi-final summary ==
=== Semi-final 1 (November 6) ===
Semi-Finalist	Order	Buzzes				Result
Semi-Finalist	Order	Walliams	Ritchie	Dixon	Jacobson	Result
Wolfpack	1					Eliminated
Loretta's Poodles	2					Eliminated
Ramadhani Brothers	3					Advanced
Sydney Male Choir	4					Eliminated
Elliot Loney	5					Eliminated
Ukraine Dancers	6					Eliminated
Walison Muh	7					Advanced
Sienna Katelyn	8					Advanced

=== Semi-final 2 (November 13) ===
Semi-Finalist	Order	Buzzes				Result
Semi-Finalist	Order	Walliams	Ritchie	Dixon	Jacobson	Result
Messoudi Brothers	1					Eliminated
Breanna	2					Eliminated
Oleg	3					Advanced
Matt Tarrant	4					Eliminated
Acromazing	5					Advanced
Bir Khalsa	6					Eliminated
Emo Majok	7					Advanced
Lucy Williamson	8					Eliminated

== Finals summary ==
=== Grand Finale (November 20) ===
Finalist	Order	Buzzes			
Finalist	Order	Walliams	Ritchie	Dixon	Jacobson
Ramadhani Brothers	1				
Walison Muh	2				
Acromazing	3				
Sienna Katelyn	4				
Emo Majok	5				
Oleg	6				

== Ratings ==
Episode		Original airdate	Timeslot	Overnight ratings		Total ratings		Ref
Episode		Original airdate	Timeslot	Viewers (millions)	Rank	Viewers (millions)	Rank	Ref
1	"Auditions"	9 October 2022	Sunday; 7:00 pm	0.645	6	1.136	4	
2	"Auditions"	10 October 2022	Monday; 7:30 pm	0.485	10	0.900	10	
3	"Auditions"	16 October 2022	Sunday; 7:00 pm	0.556	5	0.948	4	
4	"Auditions"	17 October 2022	Monday; 7:30 pm	0.470	11	0.836	11	
5	"Auditions"	23 October 2022	Sunday; 7:00 pm	0.515	6	0.892	5	
6	"Auditions"	24 October 2022	Monday; 7:30 pm	0.459	13	0.808	12	
7	"Auditions"	30 October 2022	Sunday; 7:00 pm	0.518	4	0.900	4	
8	"Auditions"	31 October 2022	Monday; 7:30 pm	0.410	12	0.752	11	
9	"Semi-finals"	6 November 2022	Sunday; 7:00 pm	0.475	7	0.821	6	
10	"Semi-finals"	13 November 2022	Sunday; 7:00 pm	0.519	4	0.908	3	
11	"Grand Finale"	20 November 2022	Sunday; 8:00pm	0.541	5	0.941	5	
