= Cam Henderson (singer) =

Australian singer and songwriter

- Born: Cameron Henderson; Geelong, Victoria, Australia
- Genres: Folk
- Occupations: Singer; songwriter
- Instruments: Vocals; guitar
- Years active: 2010

Cameron Henderson, known professionally as Cam Henderson, is an Australian singer and songwriter. Originating from Geelong, Victoria, Henderson rose to fame after placing second on the fourth series of Australia's Got Talent in 2010 and performed at the 2010 AFL Grand Final.

== Career ==
=== 2010: Australia's Got Talent ===
In 2010, Henderson and his son Taylor auditioned for the fourth series of Australia's Got Talent as a guitar and singing duo called Father & Son. After they sang Michael Jackson's "Man in the Mirror" during the audition, judge Brian McFadden suggested that the pair should be solo artists. Cam eventually placed second, with Taylor finishing third.

Henderson released Angel Without Wings in October 2010, which peaked at number 29 on the ARIA charts.

== Discography ==
=== Charting albums ===
List of albums, with Australian chart positions
Title	Album details	Peak chart positions
Title	Album details	AUS
Angel Without Wings	Released: October 2010; Format: CD, Digital; Label: Lifestyle Music, Liberation (LM2157D)	29
