= Australia's Got Talent season 4 =

Australia's Got Talent
- Season 4
- Hosted by: Grant Denyer
- Judges: Brian McFadden; Dannii Minogue; Kyle Sandilands
- Winner: Justice Crew
- Runner-up: Cameron Henderson

Release
- Original network: Seven Network
- Original release: 13 April – 15 June 2010

Season chronology
- ← Previous; Season 3 Next → Season 5

Australia's Got Talent is an Australian reality television show, based on the original UK series, to find new talent. The fourth season premiered on the Seven Network on 13 April 2010 and ended on 15 June 2010. Radio DJ Kyle Sandilands and Irish singer Brian McFadden joined the judging panel as replacements for Tom Burlinson and Red Symons. Auditions took place throughout February 2010 and were held in the five major cities across Australia. The live shows began on 11 May 2010 and ended on 15 June 2010, where dance troupe Justice Crew were crowned the winners of the fourth season of Australia's Got Talent. They were awarded a prize of $250,000. Runner-up Cameron Henderson was awarded a runner-up prize of performing at the 2010 AFL Grand Final.

== Judges ==
Judges for Australia's Got Talent Season 4

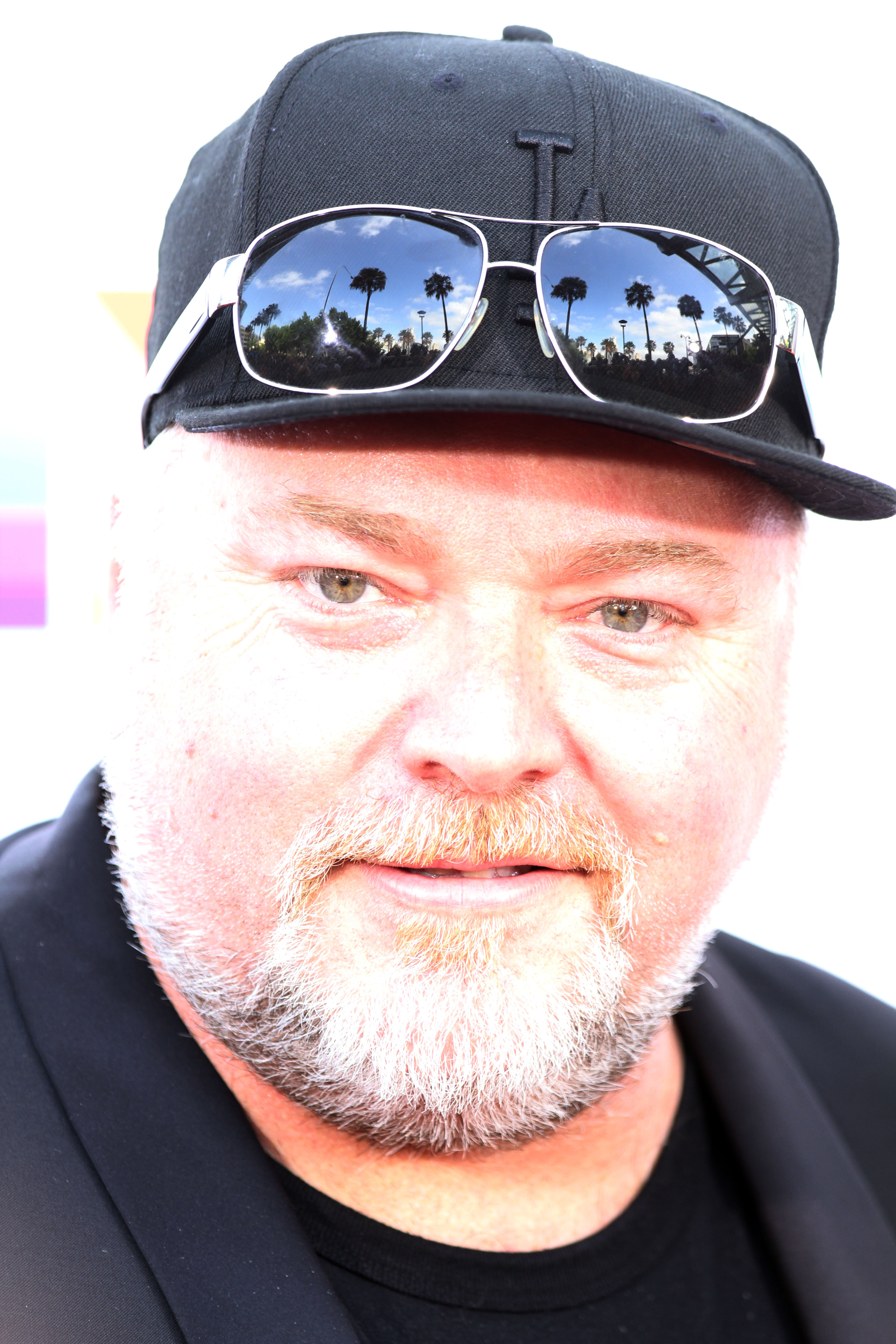
Kyle Sandilands

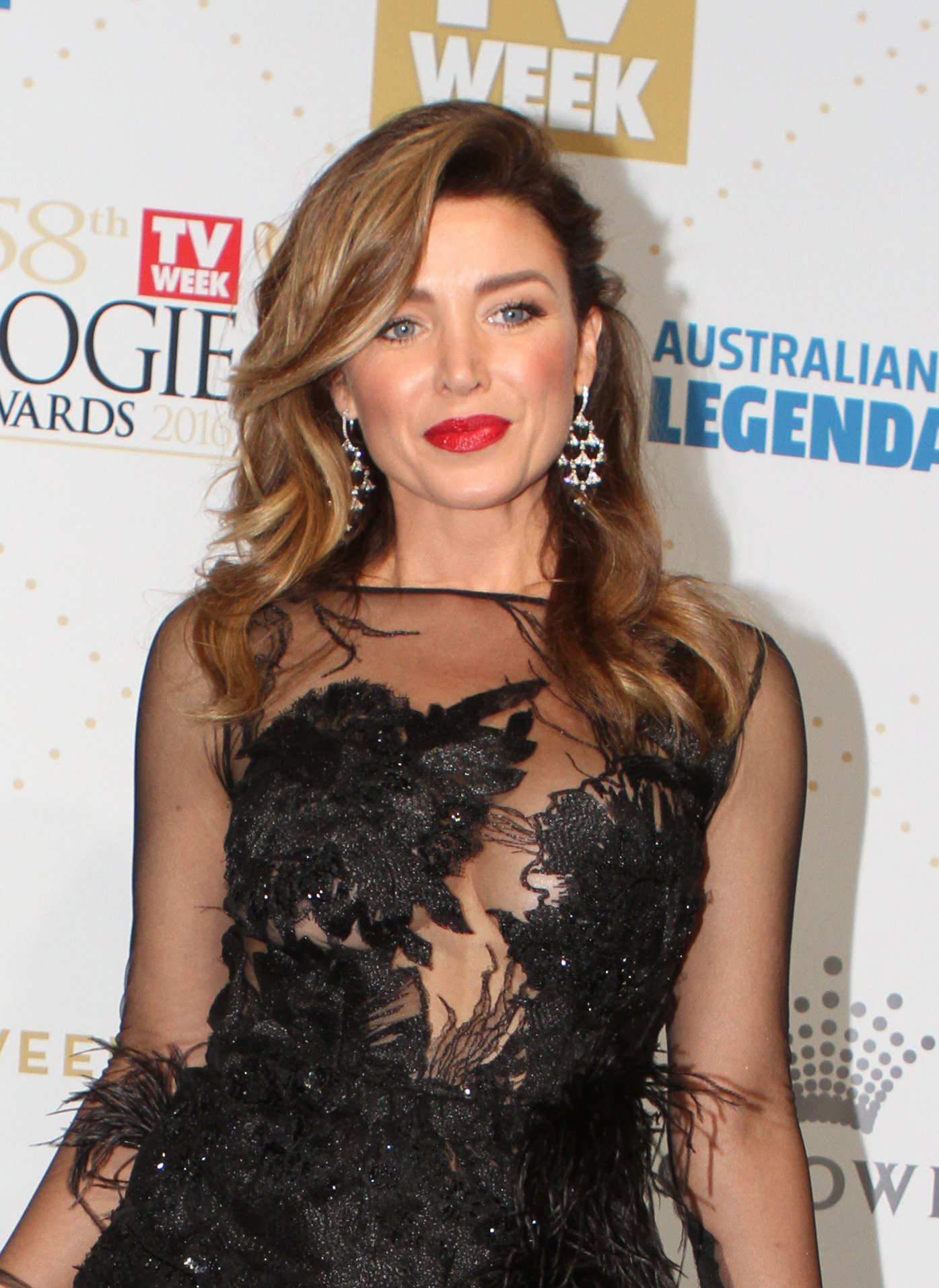
Dannii Minogue

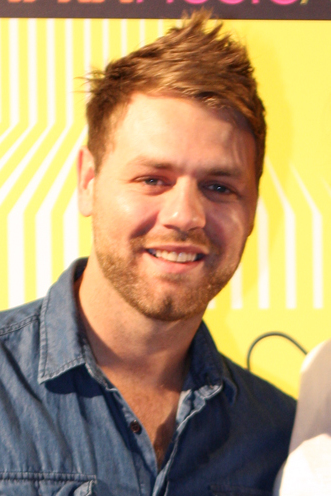
Brian McFadden

In January 2010, it was made known that the judging panel would undergo a new line-up to accommodate Minogue's pregnancy. Judge Red Symons was strongly tipped to return to the Nine Network to be part of the revived Hey Hey It's Saturday, while Tom Burlinson was rumoured to be dumped from the judging panel. Rumours then began to circulate that Kyle Sandilands and Brian McFadden would be the new judges. On 4 February 2010, Sandilands confirmed on his 2Day FM breakfast radio show that he would be a judge. A press release from the Seven Network on 17 February, confirmed McFadden would also join the new judging panel.

== Auditions ==
| Audition city | Dates | Venue |
|---|---|---|
| Sydney | 6–7 February 2010 | The Tea House – Royal Randwick Racecourse |
| Brisbane | 9 February 2010 | University of Queensland Union |
| Adelaide | 11 February 2010 | Ridley Centre – Adelaide Showgrounds |
| Melbourne | 13–14 February 2010 | Forum Theatre |
| Perth | 16 February 2010 | Regal Theatre |

== Semi-finalists ==
| Participant | Genre | Act | From | Semi-Final | Result |
|---|---|---|---|---|---|
| Adam & Selina | Magic | Magician | Perth | 2 | Finalist |
| Adil and Maimuna | Music | Guitarist and Singer | Ipswich | 2 | Semi-finalist |
| Aimee Elizabeth | Singing | Singer | Sydney | 3 | Finalist |
| Alana Conway | Singing | Singer and Harpist | Bendigo | 4 | Semi-finalist |
| Antonio Zonta | Singing | Opera Singer | Castle Hill | 1 | Semi-finalist |
| Bobby Andonov | Singing | Singer | Melbourne | 1 | Finalist |
| Brianna Bishop | Singing | Singer | Melbourne | 3 | Finalist |
| Cameron Henderson | Singing | Singer | Ceres, Victoria | 4 | Runner-up |
| Cleofatra | Dancing | Belly Dance Duo | Ipswich | 2 | Semi-finalist |
| Elvi Pes | Music | Musician | Melbourne | 2 | Semi-finalist |
| Ferah Çiçekdağ | Dancing | Belly Dancer | Wollongong | 1 | Semi-finalist |
| Grant Richardson | Music | Singer | Stockinbingal | 2 | Semi-finalist |
| Jak in the Box | Music | Beatboxing Duo | Sydney | 1 | Semi-finalist |
| Justice Crew | Dancing | Dance Group | Sydney | 2 | Winners |
| Kim Pickering Jones | Singing | Singer | Sydney | 3 | Semi-finalist |
| K-Star Evolutionz | Dancing | Dance Group | Melbourne | 1 | Semi-finalist |
| Matt Marr | Comedy | Comedian | Gold Coast | 3 | Semi-finalist |
| Mini-Bike Stunt Team | Performing | Bike Stunt Group | Brisbane | 4 | Semi-finalist |
| Parental Guidance Recommended | Performing | Entertainers | Brisbane | 3 | Semi-finalist |
| Pure Pole Angels | Gymnastics | Pole Dance Duo | Brisbane, Mackay, & Rockhampton | 4 | Semi-finalist |
| Rolling Entertainment | Performing | Dance Group | Melbourne | 1 | Finalist |
| River City Rumblers | Music | Band | Port Macquarie | 4 | Semi-finalist |
| ShortyD | Performing | Rapper | Banjup | 4 | Semi-finalist |
| Shuan Hern Lee | Music | Pianist | Perth | 1 | Semi-finalist |
| Sith vs The Jedi | Comedy | Novelty Act | Bundaberg | 3 | Semi-finalist |
| The Blackbirds | Music | Band | Byron Bay | 3 | Semi-finalist |
| The Badpiper | Performing | Bagpipe Player | Perth | 4 | Semi-finalist |
| The Belles | Music | Singing Group | Sydney | 1 | Semi-finalist |
| The Swingchesters | Dancing | Dance Duo | Melbourne | 3 | Semi-finalist |
| The Twine | Music | Band | Gold Coast | 2 | Semi-finalist |
| The Watermleon Man | Performing | Danger Act | | 1 | Semi-finalist |
| Taylor Henderson | Singing | Singer | Ceres | 4 | Finalist |
| Zenith | Dancing | Dance Group | Brisbane | 2 | Semi-finalist |

=== Semi-final summary ===
Buzzed out | Judges' vote | Advanced - Public Vote
Advanced - Judges' Vote | Eliminated - Judges' Vote | Eliminated

==== Semi-final 1 ====
| Semi-Finalist | Order | Buzzes and Judges' Vote | | | Result |
| Semi-Finalist | Order | Sandilands | Minogue | McFadden | Result |
|---|---|---|---|---|---|
| K-Star Evolutionz | 1 | | | | Eliminated (Lost Judges' Vote) |
| The Watermleon Man | 2 | | | | Eliminated |
| The Belles | 3 | | | | Eliminated |
| Antonio Zonta | 4 | | | | Eliminated |
| Shuan Hern Lee | 5 | | | | Eliminated |
| Jak in the Box | 6 | | | | Eliminated |
| Ferah Çiçekdağ | 7 | | | | Eliminated |
| Bobby Andonov | 8 | | | | Advanced (Won Public Vote) |
| Rolling Entertainment | 9 | | | | Advanced (Won Judges' Vote) |

==== Semi-final 2 ====
| Semi-Finalist | Order | Buzzes and Judges' Vote | | | Result |
| Semi-Finalist | Order | Sandilands | Minogue | McFadden | Result |
|---|---|---|---|---|---|
| Adam & Selina | 1 | | | | Advanced (Won Judges' Vote) |
| Zenith | 2 | | | | Eliminated |
| The Twine | 3 | | | | Eliminated |
| Cleofatra | 4 | | | | Eliminated |
| Grant Richardson | 5 | | | | Eliminated |
| Elvi Pes | 6 | | | | Eliminated |
| Adil and Maimuna | 7 | | | | Eliminated (Lost Judges' Vote) |
| Justice Crew | 8 | | | | Advanced (Won Public Vote) |

==== Semi-final 3 ====
| Semi-Finalist | Order | Buzzes and Judges' Vote | | | Result |
| Semi-Finalist | Order | Sandilands | Minogue | McFadden | Result |
|---|---|---|---|---|---|
| Brianna Bishop | 1 | | | | Advanced (Won Judges' Vote) |
| The Swingchesters | 2 | | | | Eliminated |
| Parental Guidance Recommended | 3 | | | | Eliminated |
| Kim Pickering Jones | 4 | | | | Eliminated |
| Sith vs The Jedi | 5 | | | | Eliminated |
| The Blackbirds | 6 | | | | Eliminated |
| Matt Marr | 7 | | | | Eliminated (Lost Judges' Vote) |
| Aimee Elizabeth | 8 | | | | Advanced (Won Public Vote) |

==== Semi-final 4 ====
| Semi-Finalist | Order | Buzzes and Judges' Vote | | | Result |
| Semi-Finalist | Order | Sandilands | Minogue | McFadden | Result |
|---|---|---|---|---|---|
| The Badpiper | 1 | | | | Eliminated |
| Cameron Henderson | 2 | ^{2} | | | Advanced (Won Judges' Vote) |
| ShortyD | 3 | | | | Eliminated |
| Alana Conway | 4 | ^{2} | | | Eliminated (Lost Judges' Vote) |
| Mini-Bike Stunt Team | 5 | | | | Eliminated |
| River City Rumblers | 6 | | | | Eliminated |
| Taylor Henderson | 7 | | | | Advanced (Won Public Vote) |
| Pure Pole Angels | 8 | | | | Eliminated |

- ^2 Due to the majority vote for Cameron Henderson, Sandilands' voting intention was not revealed.

==== Final ====
| Key | Winner | Runner-up |

| Order | Finalists | Act | |
| Order | Finalists | Act | Final Placings |
|---|---|---|---|
| 1 | Rolling Entertainment | Dance Troupe | Eliminated |
| 2 | Aimee Elizabeth | Singer | Eliminated |
| 3 | Brianna Bishop | Singer | Eliminated |
| 4 | Adam & Selina | Magician | Eliminated |
| 5 | Bobby Andonov | Singer | Eliminated |
| 6 | Taylor Henderson | Singer/Guitarist | Eliminated |
| 7 | Cameron Henderson | Singer/Guitarist | Runner Up |
| 8 | Justice Crew | Dance Troupe | Winners |

== Ratings ==
| Episode | | Airdate | Timeslot | Viewers (millions) | Night Rank | Source |
|---|---|---|---|---|---|---|
| 1 | "Auditions" | 13 April 2010 | Tuesday 7:30 pm–9:00 pm | 1.493 | 2 | |
| 2 | "Auditions" | 20 April 2010 | Tuesday 7:30 pm–9:00 pm | 1.452 | 3 | |
| 3 | "Auditions" | 27 April 2010 | Tuesday 7:30 pm–9:00 pm | 1.474 | 4 | |
| 4 | "Auditions" | 4 May 2010 | Tuesday 7:30 pm–9:00 pm | 1.461 | 5 | |
| 5 | "Live Shows" | 11 May 2010 | Tuesday 7:30 pm–9:00 pm | 1.509 | 2 | |
| 6 | "Live Shows" | 18 May 2010 | Tuesday 7:30 pm–9:00 pm | 1.422 | 6 | |
| 7 | "Live Shows" | 25 May 2010 | Tuesday 7:30 pm–9:00 pm | 1.449 | 6 | |
| 8 | "Live Shows" | 1 June 2010 | Tuesday 7:30 pm–9:00 pm | 1.587 | 3 | |
| 9 | "Live Grand Final Show" | 8 June 2010 | Tuesday 7:30 pm–9:30 pm | 1.831 | 1 | |
| 10 | "Live Grand Final Results Show" | 15 June 2010 | Tuesday 7:30 pm–9:30 pm | 1.939 | 1 | |
