= Australia's Got Talent season 9 =

Australia's Got Talent
- Season 9
- From L to R, judges Jacobson, Feildel, Durack, Scherzinger.
- Hosted by: Ricki-Lee Coulter
- Judges: Manu Feildel; Nicole Scherzinger; Shane Jacobson; Lucy Durack
- Winner: Kristy Sellars
- Runner-up: Sienna Osborne

Release
- Original network: Seven Network
- Original release: 28 July – 22 September 2019

Season chronology
- ← Previous; Season 8 Next → Season 10

Australia's Got Talent is an Australian reality television show, based on the original UK series, to find new talent. Seven Network announced that the show would be returning to their network in 2019 for its ninth season. It had previously aired on Seven for six seasons from 2007 to 2012, and on the Nine Network for two seasons in 2013 and 2016. It had an all new judging panel of Nicole Scherzinger, Shane Jacobson, Manu Feildel & Lucy Durack, and Ricki-Lee Coulter as series host. The season premiered on 28 July 2019.

The semi-final format changed from previous seasons: finalists were decided by a golden buzzer and judges' vote, with no public vote until the final.

The final was on September 22, and the winner was pole dancer Kristy Sellars.

== Semi-finalists ==
Key	Winner	Runner-up	Finalist	Withdrew	Golden Buzzer (Auditions)	Golden Buzzer (Semi-Final)

Participant	Genre	Act	Age(s)	Semi-final	Result
Akira	Dance	Dancer	30	4	Semi-Finalist
AKrobatiKa	Acrobatics	Acrobatic Group	8-30	4	Grand Finalist
Apollo Jackson	Magic	Magician	26	5	Semi-Finalist
Captain Ruin	Danger	Knife Thrower	31	2	Withdrew
Chris Vitnell	Dance	Dancer	33	5	Semi-Finalist
D. Minor	Music	Rapper	25	4	Semi-Finalist
Eddie Williams	Singing	Singer	29	2	Semi-Finalist
Emma Krause	Comedy	Comedian	42	2	Semi-Finalist
Flipping Disc Dogz	Animal	Dog Act	34	1	Semi-Finalist
FunSize	Dance	Dance Group	9-13	1	Semi-Finalist
Gavin Sempel	Comedy	Comedian	21	1	Semi-Finalist
Gayna Tension	Singing	Singer	N/A	3	Semi-Finalist
Hummingsong	Singing	Choir	19-83	3	Semi-Finalist
Jael Wena	Singing	Singer	13	4	Semi-Finalist
Jennifer Anderson	Singing	Singer	50	3	Runner-up
JJ Pantano	Comedy	Comedian	7	3	Semi-Finalist
Josh Norbido	Magic	Magician	29	4	Semi-Finalist
Kristy Sellars	Dance	Pole Dancer	33	5	Winner
Larisa Magda	Dance	Dancer	15	5	Semi-Finalist
Lil Kookies	Dance	Dance Group	9-13	2	Grand Finalist
Lioz Shem Tov	Comedy	Comedian	42	3	Grand Finalist
Mitch Tambo	Singing	Singer	29	5	Grand Finalist
Olina Loau	Singing	Singer	16	1	Runner-up
Paul Kapeleris	Singing	Singer and Pianist	22	2	Semi-Finalist
Pretty Boy Swagg	Dance	Dance Group	15-26	2	Semi-Finalist
Sienna Osborne	Dance	Dancer	13	1	Runner-up
The Space Cowboy	Danger	Danger Act	41	1	Semi-Finalist
Taj Farrant	Music	Guitarist	9	5	Semi-Finalist
Umit Bali	Comedy	Comedian	34	4	Grand Finalist
Vospertron	Dance	Dance Group	16-43	3	Semi-Finalist

== Semi-final summary ==
Buzzed Out | Golden Buzzer | Won Judges' Vote

=== Semi-final 1 (August 19) ===
Guest Judge: Jessica Mauboy

Semi-Finalist	Order	Buzzes				Result
Semi-Finalist	Order	Feildel	Scherzinger	Durack	Jacobson	Result
FunSize	1					Eliminated
Olina Loau	2					Advanced (Golden Buzzer)
Flipping Disc Dogz	3					Eliminated
Gavin Sempel	4					Eliminated
The Space Cowboy	5					Eliminated
Sienna Osborne	6					Advanced (Won Judges' Choice)

=== Semi-final 2 (August 25) ===
Guest Judge: Joel Creasey

Semi-Finalist	Order	Buzzes				Result
Semi-Finalist	Order	Feildel	Scherzinger	Durack	Jacobson	Result
Eddie Williams	1					Eliminated
Pretty Boy Swagg	2					Eliminated
Emma Krause	3					Eliminated
Captain Ruin	4					Advanced (Golden Buzzer)
Paul Kapeleris	5					Eliminated
Lil Kookies	6					Advanced (Won Judges' Choice)

=== Semi-final 3 (September 1) ===
Guest Judge: Hans

Semi-Finalist	Order	Buzzes				Result
Semi-Finalist	Order	Feildel	Scherzinger	Durack	Jacobson	Result
Hummingsong	1					Eliminated
Lioz Shem Tov	2					Advanced (Won Judges' Choice)
Vospertron	3					Eliminated
Jennifer Anderson	4					Advanced (Golden Buzzer)
JJ Pantano	5					Eliminated
Gayna Tension	6					Eliminated

=== Semi-final 4 (September 8) ===
Guest Judge: Todd McKenney

Semi-Finalist	Order	Buzzes				Result
Semi-Finalist	Order	Feildel	Scherzinger	Durack	Jacobson	Result
Jael Wena	1					Eliminated
Josh Norbido	2					Eliminated
Akira	3					Eliminated
Umit Bali	4					Advanced (Won Judges' Choice)
AKrobatiKa	5					Advanced (Golden Buzzer)
D. Minor	6					Eliminated

=== Semi-final 5 (September 15) ===
Guest Judge: Natalie Bassingthwaighte

Semi-Finalist	Order	Buzzes				Result
Semi-Finalist	Order	Feildel	Scherzinger	Durack	Jacobson	Result
Kristy Sellars	1					Advanced (Won Judges' Choice)
Taj Farrant	2					Eliminated
Chris Vitnell	3					Eliminated
Larisa Magda	4					Eliminated
Apollo Jackson	5					Eliminated
Mitch Tambo	6					Advanced (Golden Buzzer)

== Finals summary ==
In the final, the judges chose a top four, which was then chosen by SMS votes from viewers in the eastern states. The final was pre-recorded, with four different endings filmed, one for each of the four possible winners. The winner of the season was pole dancer Kristy Sellars.

The Grand Finale had nine acts because one semi-final golden buzzer act (Captain Ruin) was unavailable.

Guest performers: Samantha Jade, Cosentino

Finalist	Order	Finished
Sienna Osborne	1	Runner-Up
Lioz Shem Tov	2	Eliminated
Jennifer Anderson	3	Runner-Up
Lil Kookies	4	Eliminated
Umit Bali	5	Eliminated
Mitch Tambo	6	Eliminated
AKrobatiKa	7	Eliminated
Kristy Sellars	8	Winner
Olina Loau	9	Runner-Up

== Ratings ==
Episode		Original airdate	Timeslot	Viewers (millions)	Nightly rank	Ref.
1	"Auditions"	28 July 2019	Sunday; 7:00 pm	0.875	4	
2	"Auditions"	29 July 2019	Monday; 7:30 pm	0.694	12	
3	"Auditions"	4 August 2019	Sunday; 7:00 pm	0.871	4	
4	"Auditions"	5 August 2019	Monday; 7:30 pm	0.759	9	
5	"Auditions"	11 August 2019	Sunday; 7:00 pm	0.879	4	
6	"Auditions"	12 August 2019	Monday; 7:30 pm	0.749	9	
7	"Auditions"	18 August 2019	Sunday; 7:00 pm	0.917	4	
8	"Semifinals"	19 August 2019	Monday; 7:30 pm	0.691	9	
9	"Semifinals"	25 August 2019	Sunday; 7:00 pm	0.782	5	
10	"Semifinals"	1 September 2019	Sunday; 7:00 pm	0.748	5	
11	"Semifinals"	8 September 2019	Sunday; 7:00 pm	0.742	5	
12	"Semifinals"	15 September 2019	Sunday; 7:00 pm	0.698	4	
13	"Grand Finale" "Winner Announced"	22 September 2019	Sunday; 7:00 pm	0.791 0.771	4 5	
