= Emo Majok =

South Sudanese Australian comedian

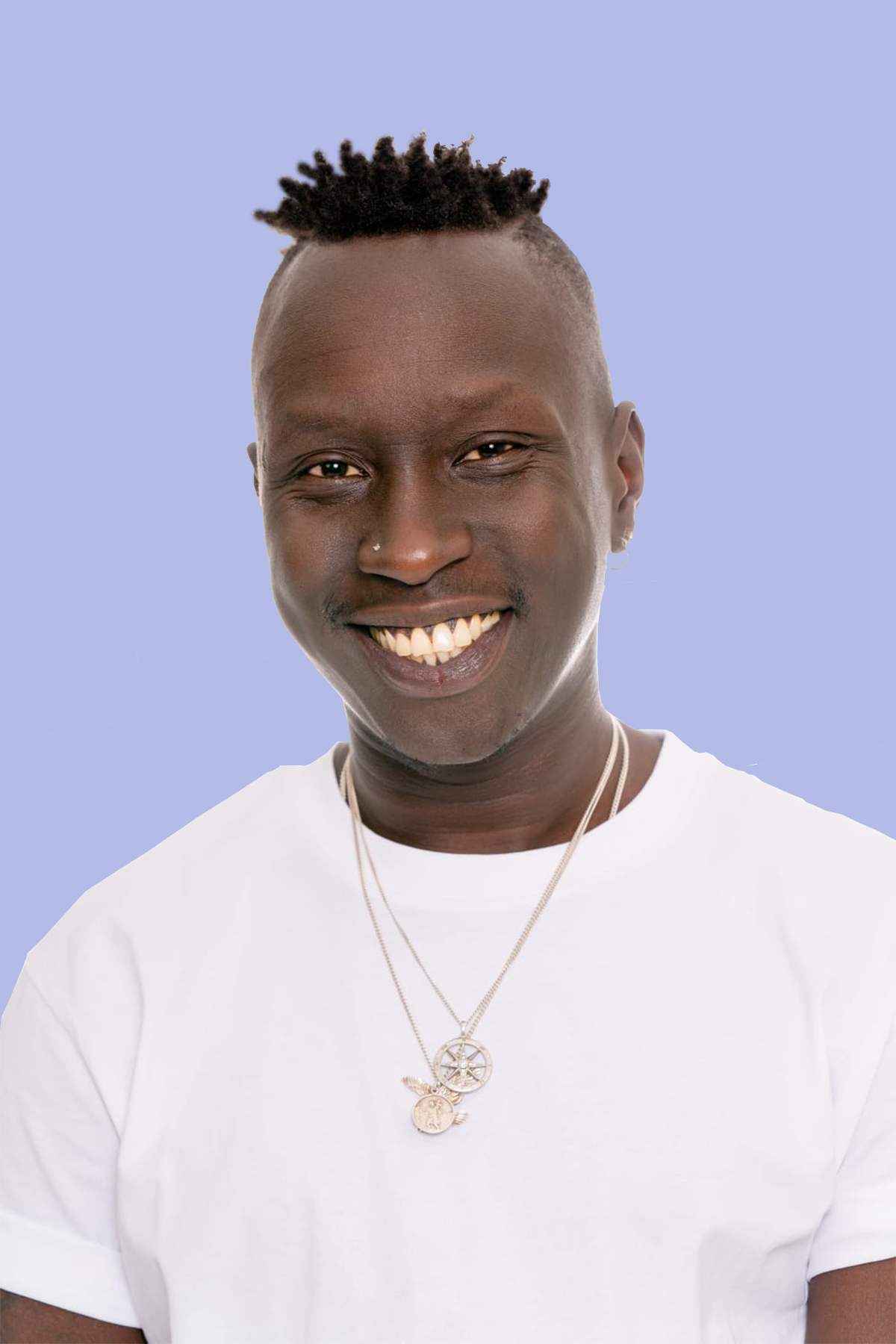
- Emo in 2023
- Born: Emmanuel Gureec Majok; 6 August 1988 (age 38); Ethiopia

Comedy career
- Years active: 2018–present
- Medium: Stand-up
- Genres: Observational comedy; political satire; surreal humor; black comedy
- Subjects: Social life; refugees; politics; economical life; religion; relationships; education
- Website: https://www.emomajok.com/

Emo Majok, born Emmanuel Gureec Majok (6 August 1988) is a South Sudanese Australian Stand up comedian. He was a winner at the Western Australia Raw Comedy and a finalist at the 10th edition of Australia's Got Talent.

== Early life ==
Emo was born on 6 August 1988 in Itang refugee camp, Gambela Region, Ethiopia to Sudanese parents, who having fled the Second Sudanese Civil War which claimed over 2 million lives, settled in a Itang refugee camp in Ethiopia. When he was 3 years old, the Ethiopian Civil War forced his family and thousands of other displaced refugees to walk for weeks until they reached Kakuma Refugee Camp, in northern Kenya.

In 1996, when Emo was 8 years old, the family was sponsored to relocate to Australia where they settled in Girrawheen, Western Australia in the northern suburbs of Perth,.

In the mid 90's while in school, Emo used to love entertaining his friends

== Comedy ==
2018–Present

In 2018 Emo and his childhood friend, Joe White, performed a number of shows titled White vs. Black at the Perth Fringe World Festival. in the same year, he won the Western Australia Raw Comedy finals as the Funniest Amateur Comedian in Western Australia which earned him a ticket to compete at the 2018 Melbourne International Comedy Festival

In January 2019, Emo performed at the Fringe World Festival with his show Not Quite Grown Yet

Emo produced and headlined the show Can We Laugh Again at the Heath Ledger Theatre, Perth, in October 2020.

In April 2021, he performed at the Fad Gallery, Melbourne, in a show titled Black Santa

In 2022, Emo received the golden buzzer to make it to the semi-finals of Australia's Got Talent (season 10) where he later made it to the finals. In August 2022, he performed for the first time at the Edinburgh Festival Fringe in the Bistro Square in a show dubbed African Aussie. In October, Emo was a participant in the ABC Radio Comedy Debate and also in the same month, was part of the Perth Comedy Festival Showcase Tour. In November, he hosted the Western Australia Comedy Week – All Stars at Northbridge, Perth. In December he performed a live show at Fitzroy, Melbourne.

In March 2023, Emo performed at the Joondalup Festival at Hilary's Boat Harbour, Perth and at the Perth International Comedy Festival. In April, he shared the stage with Basketmouth and Aliya Kanani at Emperor's Palace, in the Johannesburg International Comedy Festival and later that month he performed at the Comics Lounge, Melbourne. In July, he performed African Aussie at the Toronto Fringe Festival. In August, he was one of the performers in the Comedy Gold Tour in Western Australia

== Personal life ==
Emo has three children from a previous relationship

== Specials ==
- White vs. Black - 2018
- Just Your Typical Aussie - 2020
- Black Santa – 2020
- Black Santa Returns – 2022
- African Aussie – 2022

== Awards ==
Year	Award	Category	Nominee(s)	Result	Ref.
2018	WA Raw Comedy	Funniest New Comedian	Nominees	Won	
2018	Raw Comedy National Finals	Funniest New Comedian	Nominees	Finalist	
2021	Comedy Lounge	Comedian of The Year	Nominees	Won	
2022	Comics Lounge	Best Interstate Act	Nominees	Won	
2022	Australias Got Talent	Category	Nominees	Finalist	
2023	Toronto Fringe	Patrons' Pick	Nominees	Won	
