= Ramadhani Brothers =

Acrobatic duo

Fadhili Ramadhani Ibrahim Jobu
- Born: Tanzania
- Occupation: Acrobatic
- Website: www.ramadhanibrothers.com

The Ramadhani Brothers are an acrobatic duo consisting of Fadhili Ramadhani and Ibrahim Jobu. The duo is from Dar es Salaam, Tanzania.

They competed in Australia's Got Talent in 2022 and America's Got Talent in 2023. They won America's Got Talent: Fantasy League in 2024, making them the first African talent to win a competition of the America's Got Talent series.

== Career ==
The Ramadhani Brothers are known for being an acrobatic duo where Fadhili balances upside down on Ibrahim's head, often times while going up ladders or steps.

=== Australia's Got Talent ===
In 2022, the duo competed on the tenth season of Australia's Got Talent. They received the golden buzzer from judge Kate Ritchie and advanced to the final, where they finished as finalists.

=== America's Got Talent ===
In 2023, the duo auditioned for America's Got Talent during its eighteenth season. They progressed to the semi-finals, and then the finale where they finished in fifth place.

=== America's Got Talent: Fantasy League ===
In 2024, the Ramadhani Brothers were selected out of 40 acts to compete on America's Got Talent: Fantasy League. They were drafted to Heidi Klum's team. Once they performed in the preliminary round, judge Howie Mandel used his golden buzzer to "steal" them to his team. The Ramadhani Brothers advanced to the finale, where they won the series on February 19, 2024. They received US$250,000.
