= Australia's Got Talent: Challengers & Champions =

Australian TV show

- Genre: Talent show
- Created by: Simon Cowell
- Presented by: Ricki-Lee Coulter
- Judges: Shane Jacobson; David Walliams; Alesha Dixon; Kate Ritchie
- Country of origin: Australia
- Original language: English
- No. of seasons: 1

Production
- Producers: Fremantle Australia; SYCOtv
- Running time: 90 minutes (including commercials)

Related
- Australia's Got Talent; America's Got Talent: The Champions

Australia's Got Talent: Challengers & Champions (often abbreviated as Challengers & Champions) is a cancelled spin-off of Australia's Got Talent (also known as AGT), a televised Australian talent show competition, created by Simon Cowell. The program is produced by Fremantle Australia for Seven Network.

== History ==
In October 2019, Seven announced that Australia's Got Talent would be returning in 2020, however in the format of The Champions which will feature a variety of participants from across the Got Talent franchise - winners, finalists, live round participants, and other notable entries - competing against each other to secure a place in a grand final and a chance to win a cash prize.

In March 2020, it was announced that Ricki-Lee Coulter will return as host, with Manu Feildel and Shane Jacobson as returning judges along with new judges Sonia Kruger and Olympia Valance.

In March 2020, the series was delayed as a health and safety precaution to the COVID-19 pandemic in Australia, as such during production there would be no international acts or an audience, a resume date has yet to be given. Kruger will no longer be a judge on the series due to a busy schedule.

In June 2021, Seven announced the show would no longer be a spin-off and that the format would still be used for the upcoming tenth season of the main series set to premiere in 2022.
