= Australia's Got Talent =

Australian reality television series

- Genre: Talent show
- Created by: Simon Cowell
- Presented by: Ricki-Lee Coulter; Dave Hughes; Julia Morris; Grant Denyer
- Judges: Dannii Minogue; Red Symons; Tom Burlinson; Kyle Sandilands; Brian McFadden; Dawn French; Timomatic; Geri Halliwell; Kelly Osbourne; Ian 'Dicko' Dickson; Sophie Monk; Eddie Perfect; Nicole Scherzinger; Manu Feildel; Lucy Durack; Shane Jacobson; Alesha Dixon; David Walliams; Kate Ritchie
- Countries of origin: Australia; New Zealand
- Original language: English
- No. of seasons: 10
- No. of episodes: 122

Production
- Production locations: Various (auditions); Regent Theatre, Melbourne (2007–09); Docklands Studios Melbourne (2010–12); Fox Studios, Sydney (2013); Capitol Theatre, Melbourne (2016); Palais Theatre (2019); Big Top Sydney (2019); Sydney Coliseum Theatre (2022); Riverside Theatres Parramatta (2022)
- Running time: 90 minutes (including commercials)
- Production companies: Fremantle Australia; SYCOtv

Original release
- Network: Seven Network (Australia) (2007–12, 2019, 2022); Nine Network (Australia) (2013, 2016); TVNZ (New Zealand) (2019, 2022)
- Release: 18 February 2007 – 20 November 2022

Related
- Australia's Got Talent: Challengers & Champions; America's Got Talent; Britain's Got Talent

Australia's Got Talent is an Australian reality television talent show. The show is based on the Got Talent with Simon Cowell.

The first six seasons aired on the Seven Network, from 2007 to 2012. In the first season the judges were Tom Burlinson, Red Symons and Dannii Minogue. The first season aired at 6:30pm on Sunday nights. After a successful run, the series was given a vote of confidence as Seven moved the show to a more competitive Tuesday night timeslot. The second season aired from 29 April 2008. Burlinson and Symons did not return for season four and were replaced by Kyle Sandilands and Brian McFadden.

For season seven in 2013 the show moved to the Nine Network. Dawn French, Geri Halliwell and Timomatic who is the additional fourth judge joined the panel as replacements for McFadden and Minogue. On 4 April 2014, it was announced that Nine had axed Australia's Got Talent due to low ratings. On 8 July 2015, Nine announced that the show would be returning in 2016 for an eighth season. The Nine Network aired season eight in 2016, with four new judges: Kelly Osbourne, Ian "Dicko" Dickson, Sophie Monk and Eddie Perfect.

In December 2018, Seven announced the series would be returning to their network in 2019 for a ninth season. The ninth season, with Ricki-Lee Coulter as host, returned on 28 July 2019.

In June 2021, Seven announced a new season and judging panel; however due to COVID-19 restrictions in Sydney, the production of the season was postponed to 2022, with Shane Jacobson returning, alongside Kate Ritchie, and Britain’s Got Talent judges David Walliams and Alesha Dixon. The tenth season premiered on 9 October 2022.

== Overview ==
Australia's Got Talent is a talent show that features performers of all ages competing for a top prize of between A$100,000 and A$250,000.

The season consists of three stages: auditions, semi-finals, and a final. Only highlights are screened from the auditions. Some seasons included auditions in different cities. The judges cull down the approved audition acts to about 40 acts for the semi-finals.

In most seasons, the semi-finals included a public vote, with a combination of public and judges' choices making the final. Also in the first series, during the semi-finals stage, each judge buzzed either a cross, or a tick. In Season 9, there is no public voting in the semi-finals.

The logo used for the first, seventh and ninth seasons of Australia's Got Talent is similar to the logo used by America's Got Talent. The logo during the second to sixth seasons and season eight is similar to that used by Britain's Got Talent.

== Judges and hosts ==
	Seasons									
	1	2	3	4	5	6	7	8	9	10
	2007	2008	2009	2010	2011	2012	2013	2016	2019	2022
Hosts
Grant Denyer	Main									
Julia Morris							Main			
Dave Hughes								Main		
Ricki-Lee Coulter									Main	
Judging Panelists
Dannii Minogue	Main									
Red Symons	Main									
Tom Burlinson	Main									
Brian McFadden				Main						
Kyle Sandilands				Main						
Dawn French							Main			
Timomatic							Main			
Geri Halliwell							Main			
Eddie Perfect								Main		
Kelly Osbourne								Main		
Sophie Monk								Main		
Ian Dickson								Main		
Lucy Durack									Main	
Nicole Scherzinger									Main	
Manu Feildel									Main	
Shane Jacobson									Main	
Alesha Dixon										Main
David Walliams										Main
Kate Ritchie										Main

Notes

1. Todd McKenney served as a temporary replacement for Kyle Sandilands at the Melbourne auditions and filled in for Brian McFadden during the second final showdown during the sixth season.

=== Judges ===
The original three judges were Dannii Minogue, Red Symons and Tom Burlinson. For the second series, all judges returned, though Minogue was absent for numerous episodes as she was busy filming The X Factor in the United Kingdom. The judges later returned for series 3.

In January 2010, it was made known that the judging panel would undergo a new line-up to accommodate Minogue's pregnancy. Judge Red Symons was strongly tipped to return to the Nine Network to be part of the revived Hey Hey It's Saturday, while Tom Burlinson was rumoured to be dumped from the judging panel. Rumours then began to circulate that Kyle Sandilands and Brian McFadden would be the new judges. On 4 February 2010, Sandilands confirmed on his 2Day FM breakfast radio show that he would be a judge. A press release from the Seven Network on 17 February, confirmed McFadden would also join the new judging panel. All judges returned for the fifth and sixth series of the programme.

Due to the programme's move to Nine Network in 2013, Sandilands returned as a judge, whilst Minogue and McFadden were axed. Timomatic, Geri Halliwell and Dawn French were announced as the new judges.

After it was announced that Australia's Got Talent would be returning to screens in 2016, it was announced that there would be a complete new judging panel, with Sandilands, Halliwell, French and Timomatic being axed. It was later confirmed that Ian Dickson, Sophie Monk, Kelly Osbourne and Eddie Perfect would become the new judges.

In May 2019, Manu Feildel, Nicole Scherzinger, Lucy Durack and Shane Jacobson were announced as the judging panel for season 9.

In June 2022, it was announced that the season 10 judging panel would consist of Jacobson, Kate Ritchie, and Britain’s Got Talent judges David Walliams and Alesha Dixon.

=== Presenters ===
Presenters gallery

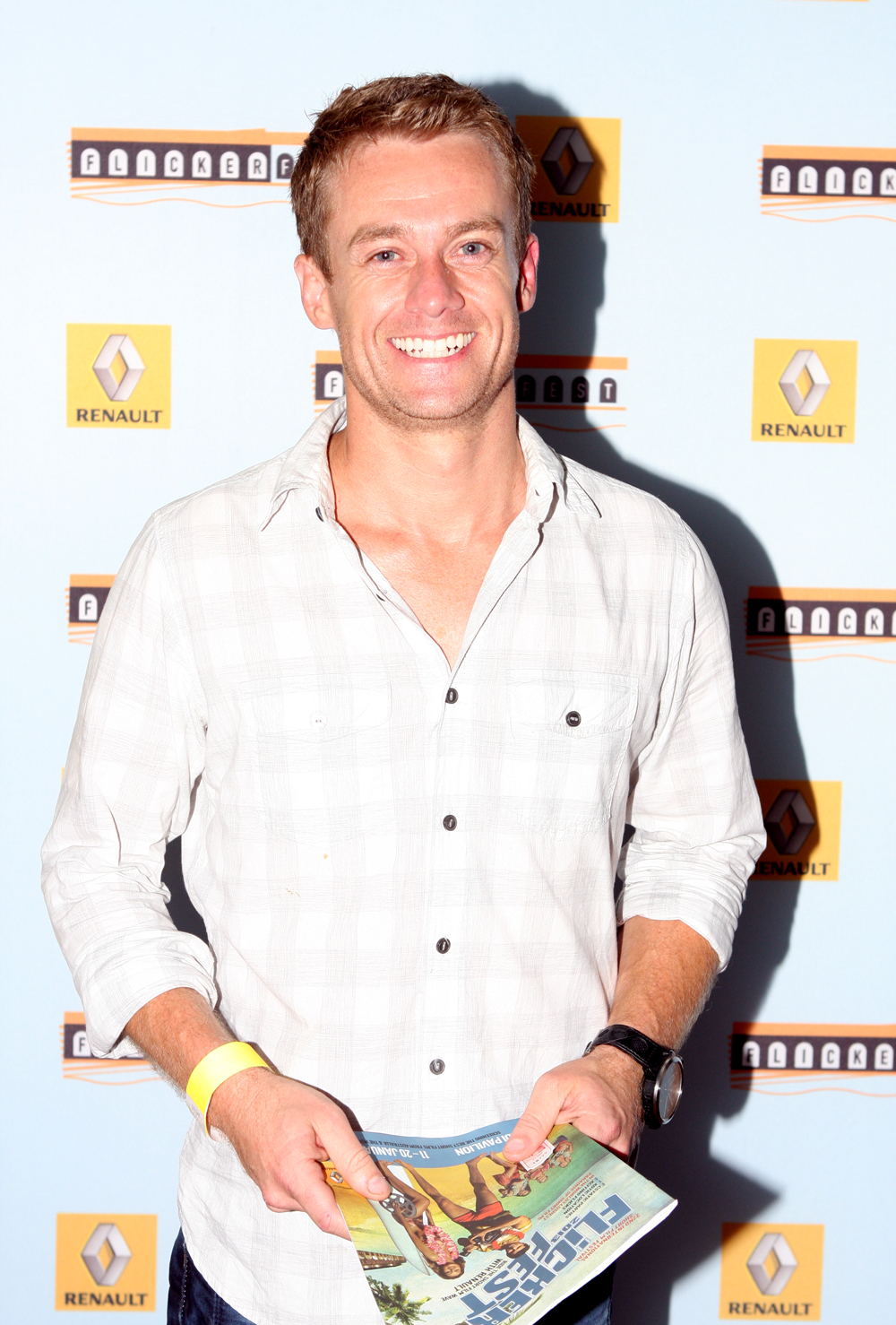
Grant Denyer (2007–2012)

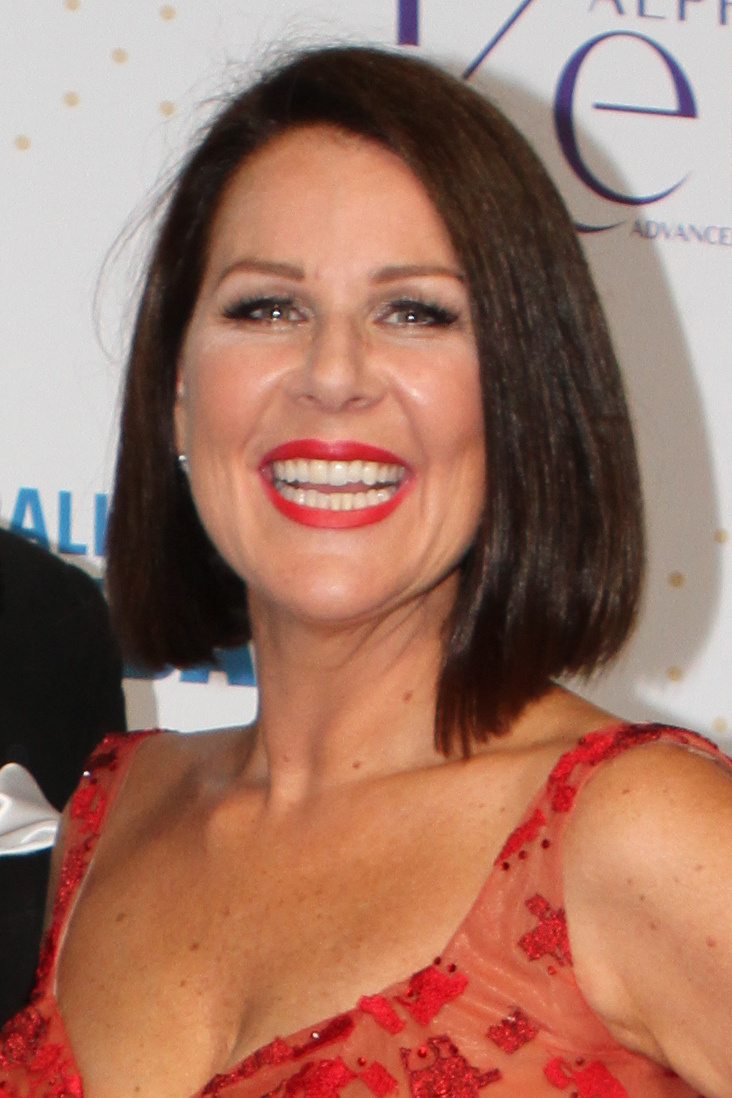
Julia Morris (2013)

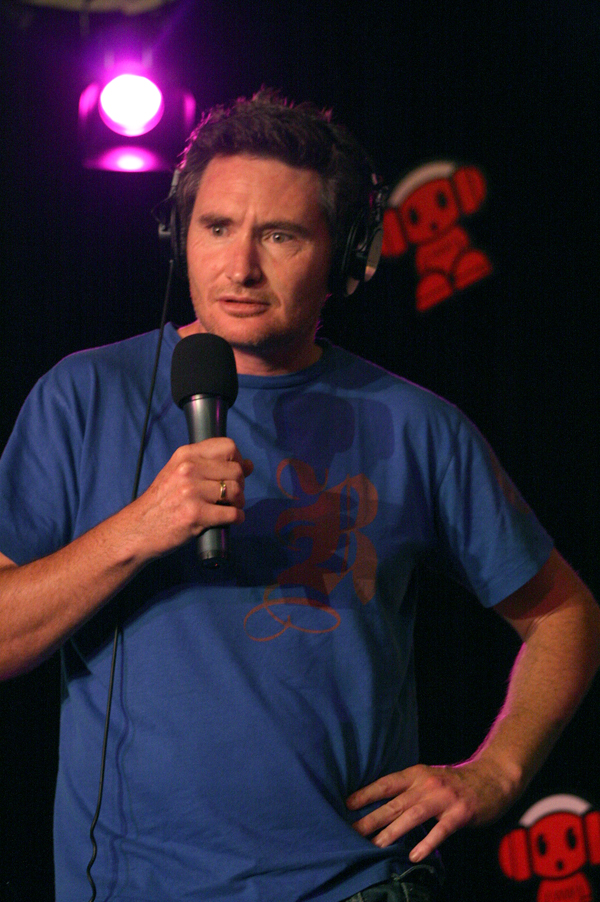
Dave Hughes (2016)

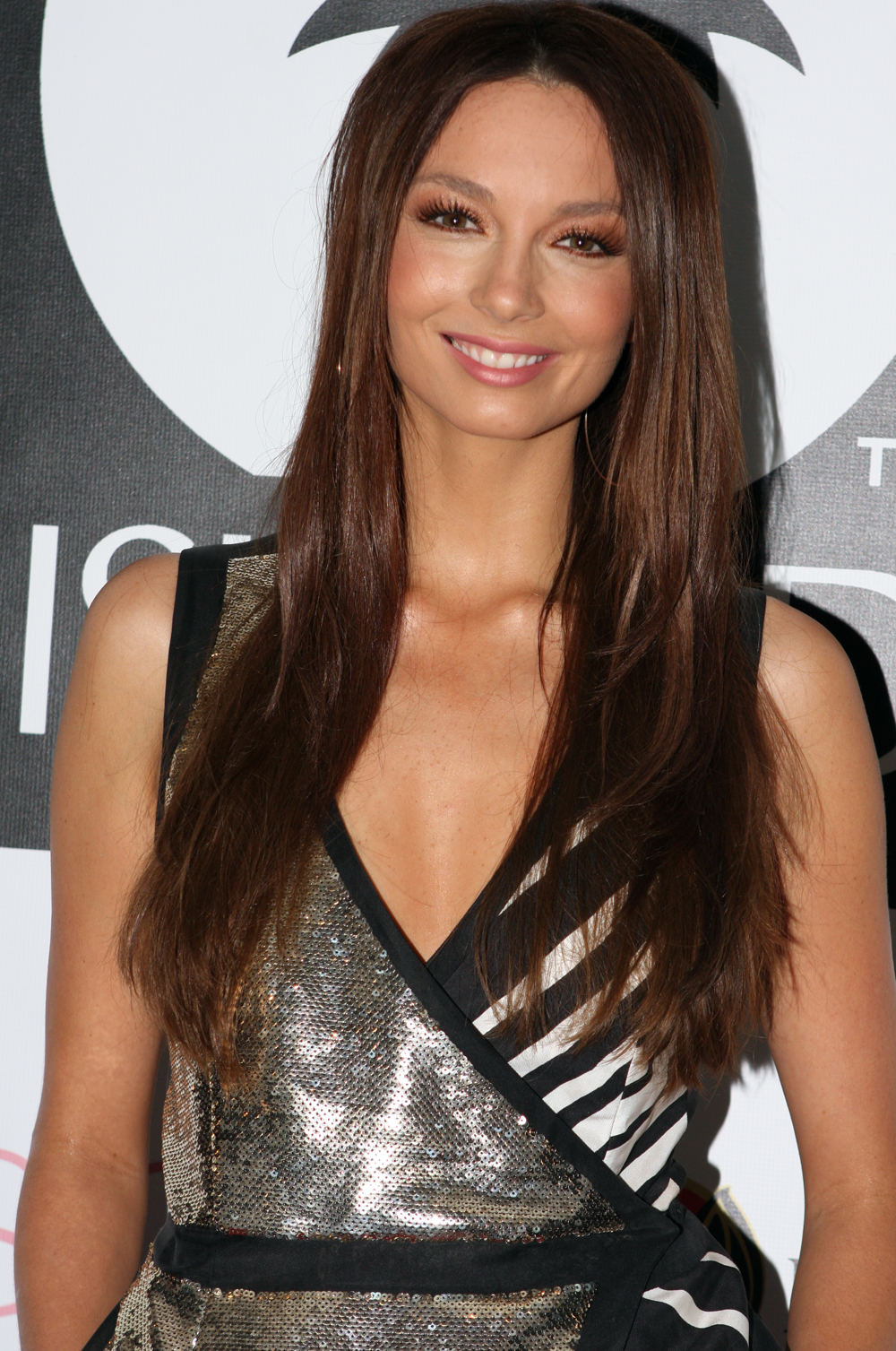
Ricki-Lee Coulter (2019, 2022)

=== Judges ===
Judges gallery

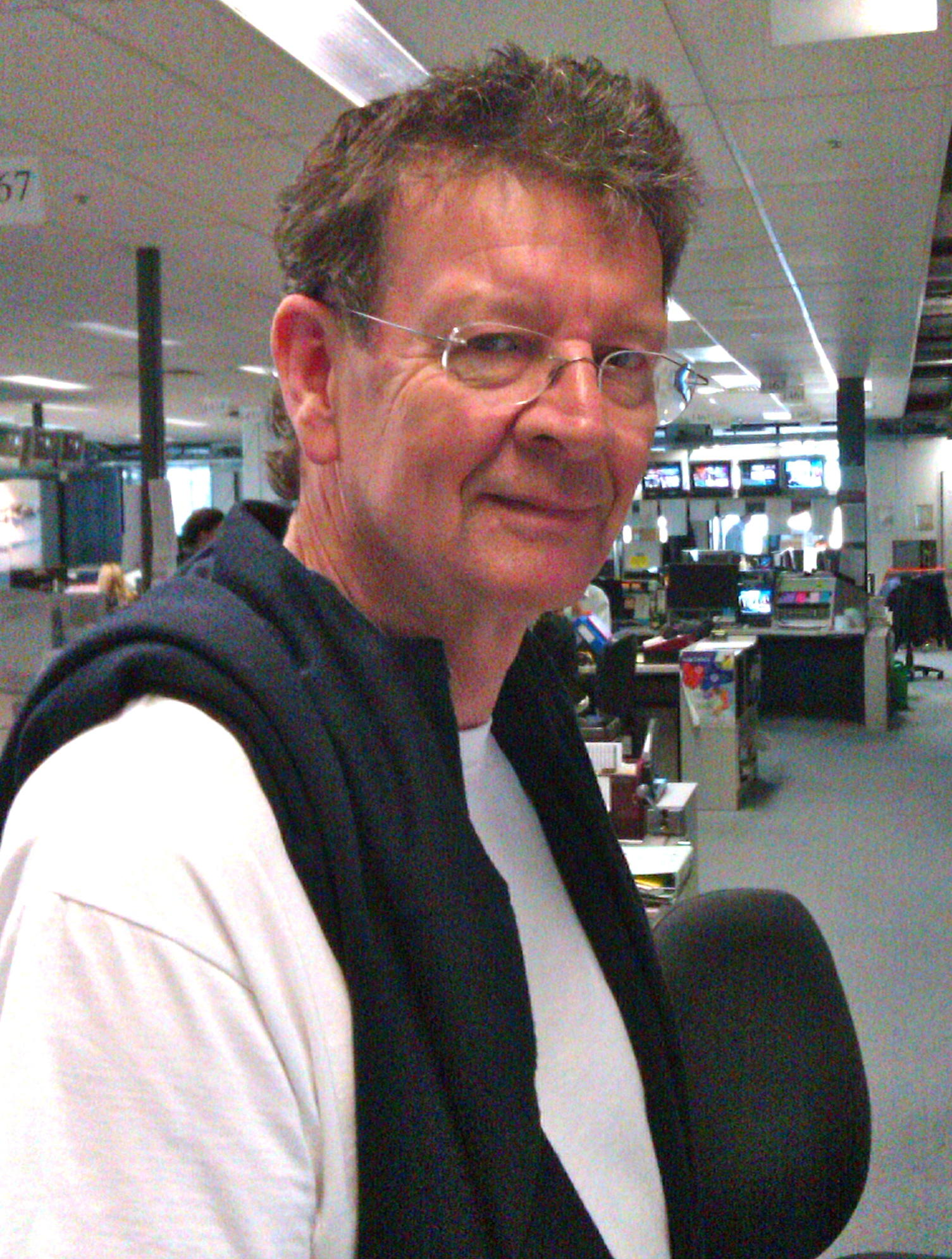
Red Symons (2007–2009)

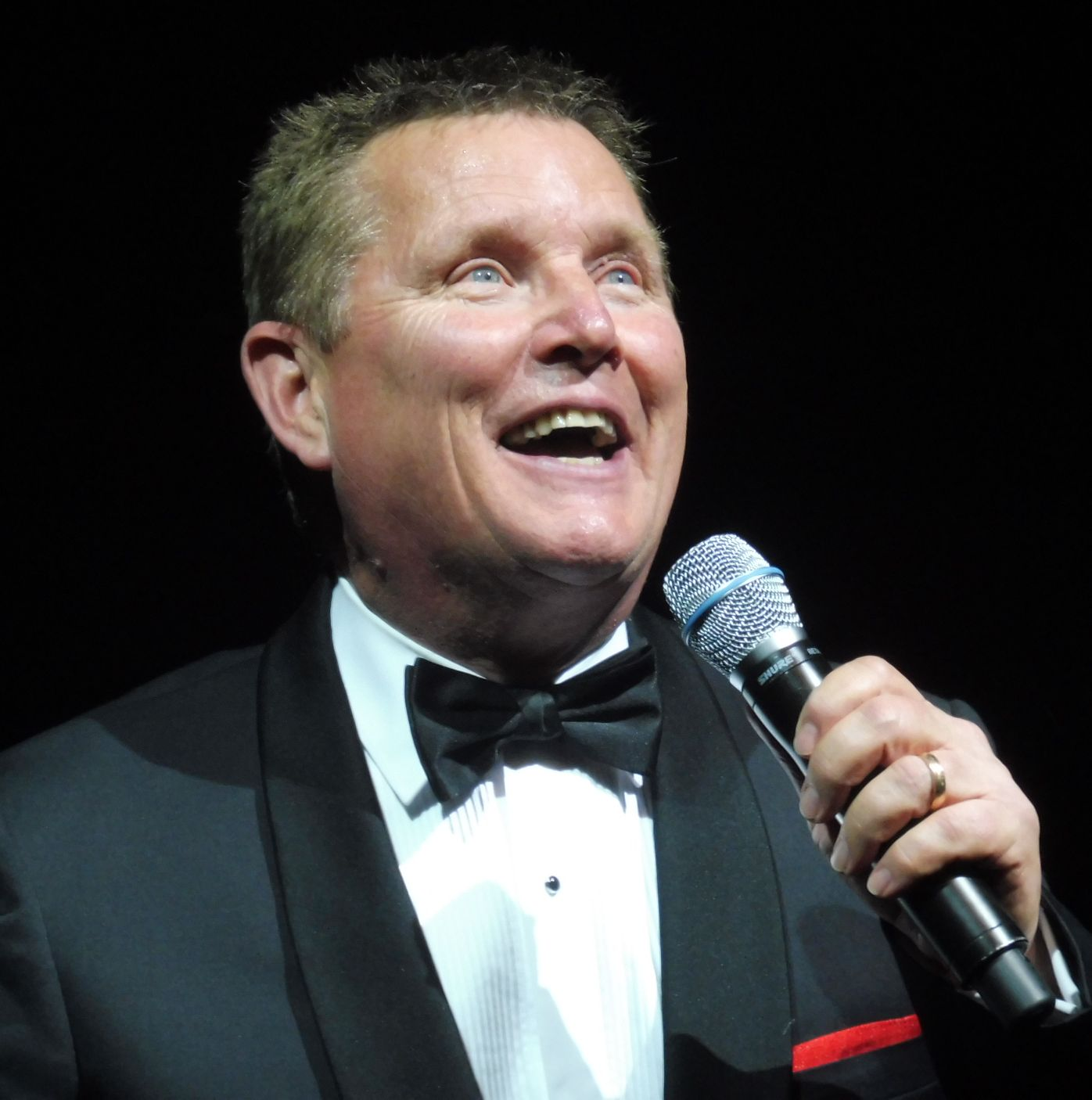
Tom Burlinson (2007–2009)

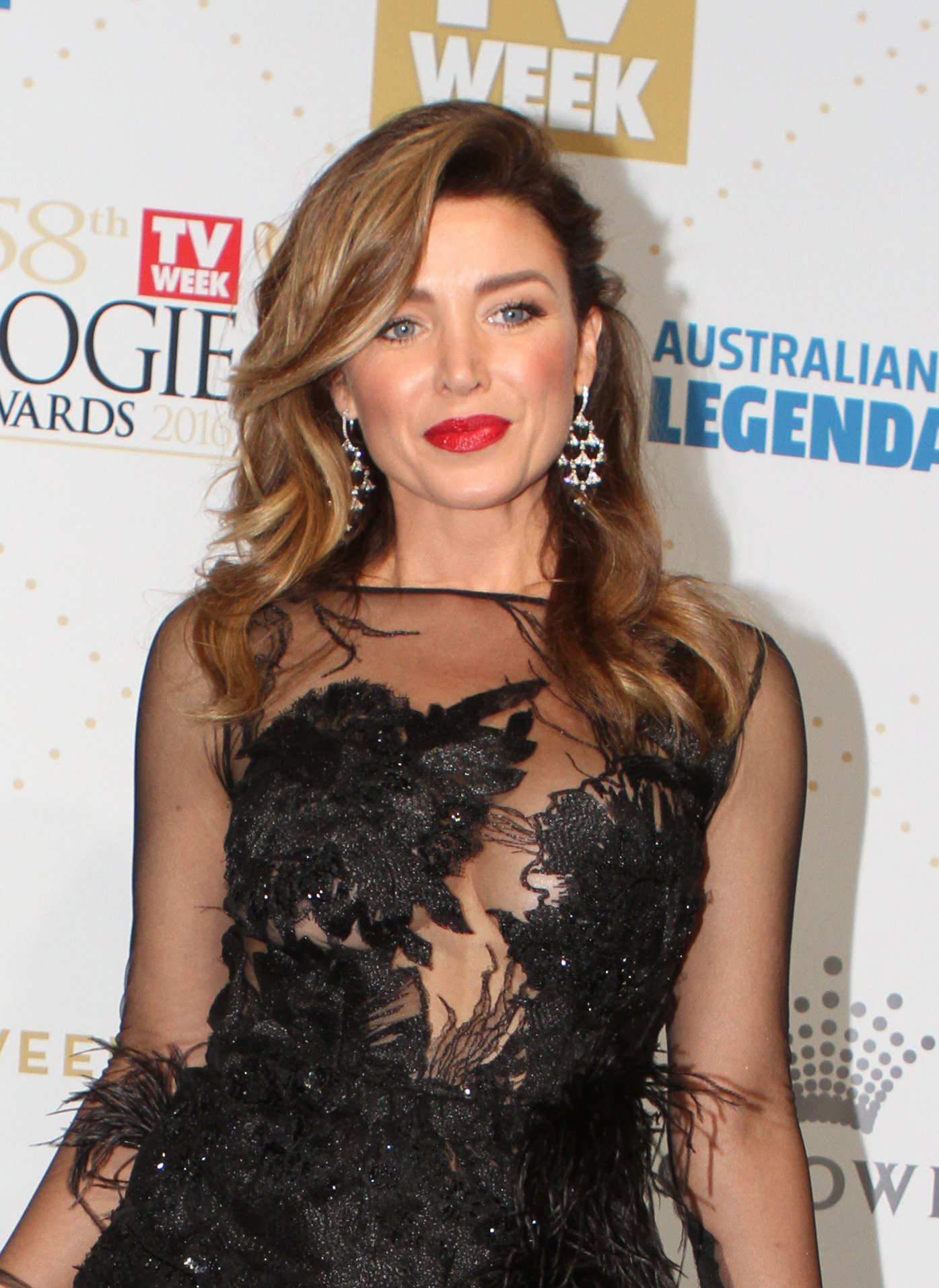
Dannii Minogue (2007–2012)

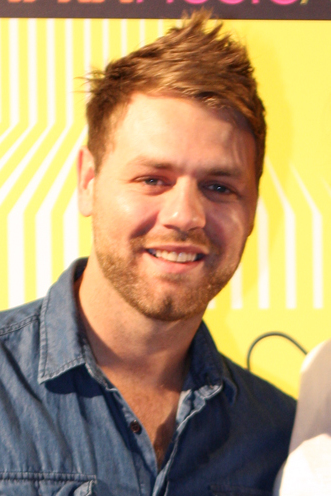
Brian McFadden (2010–2012)

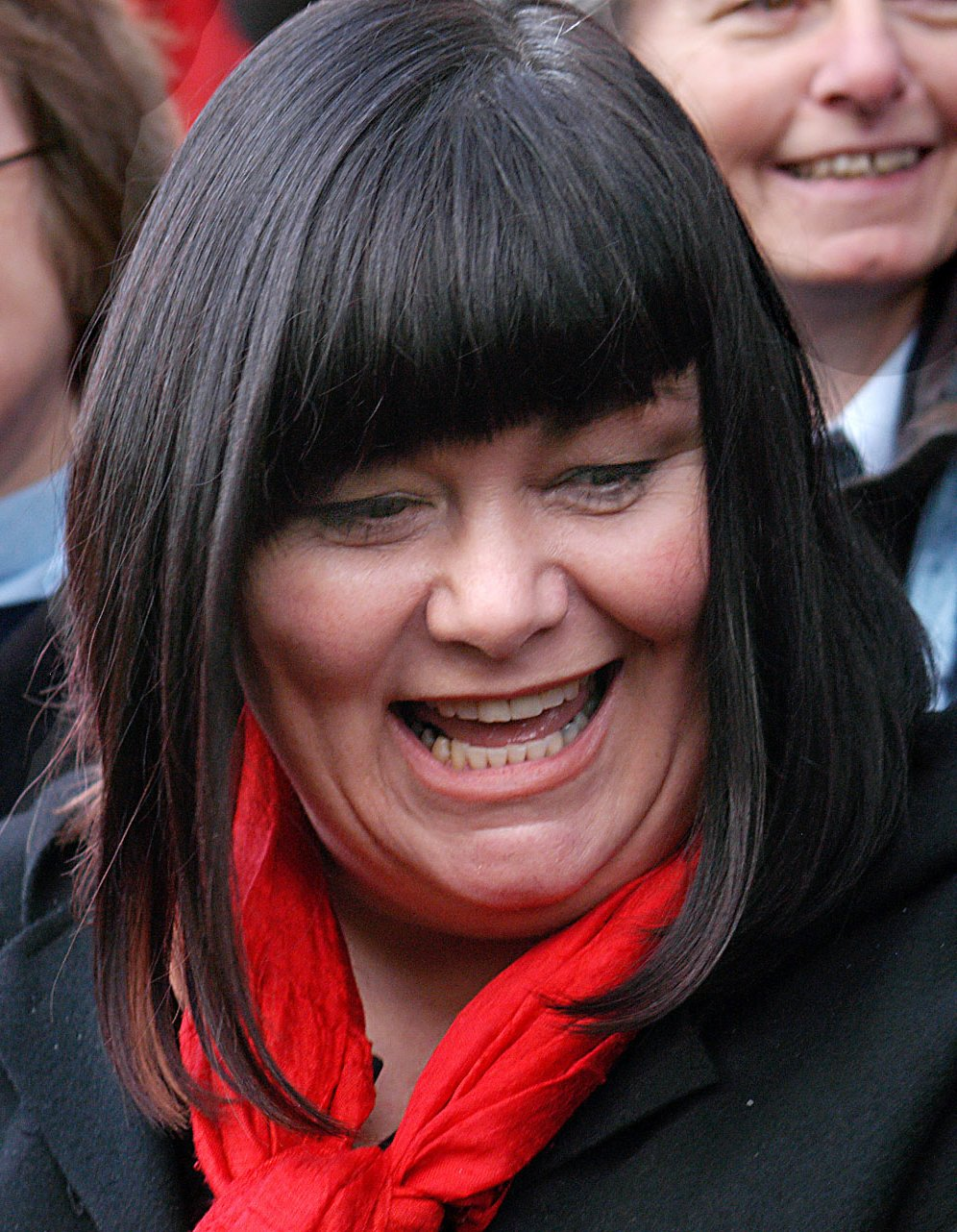
Dawn French (2013)

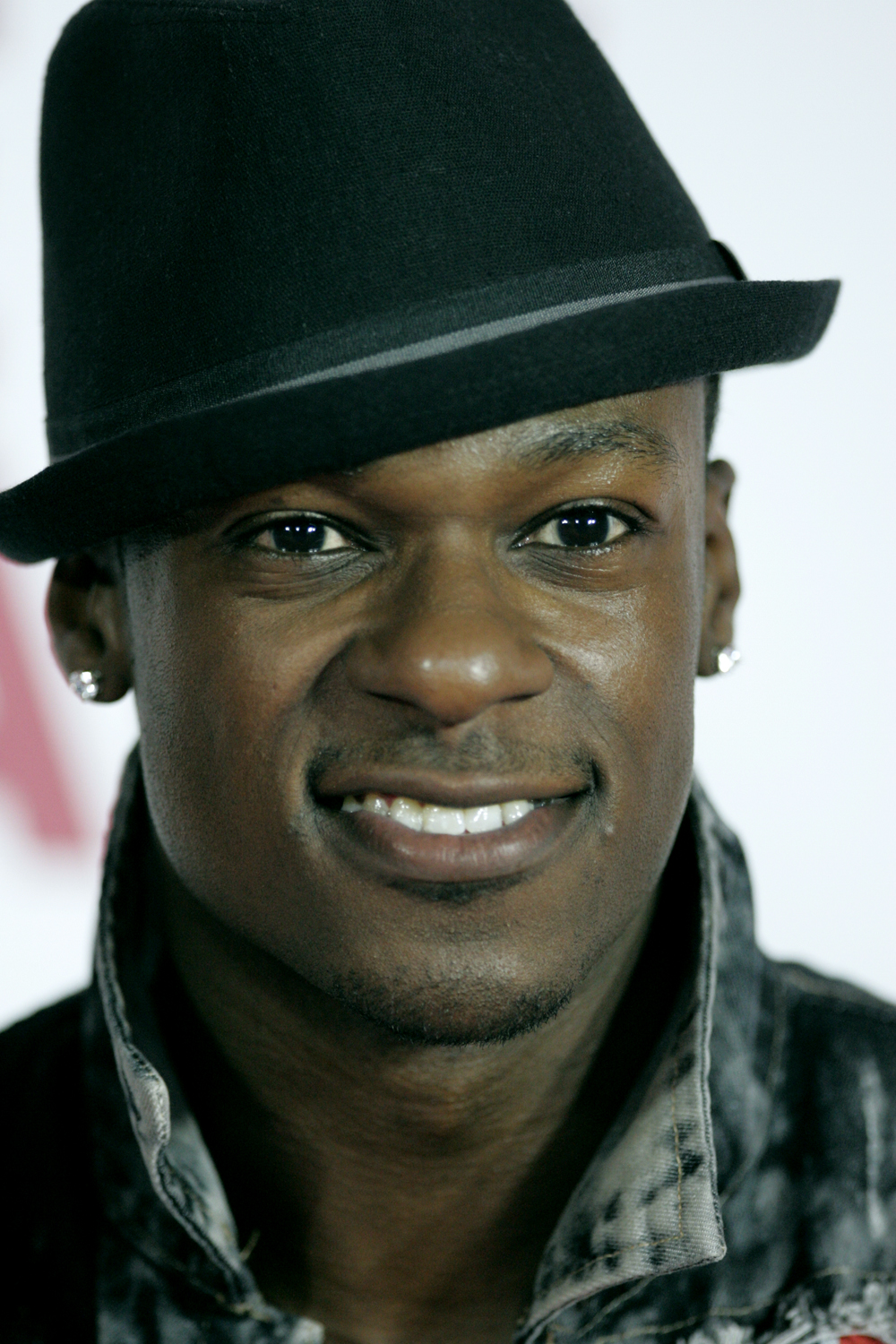
Timomatic (2013)

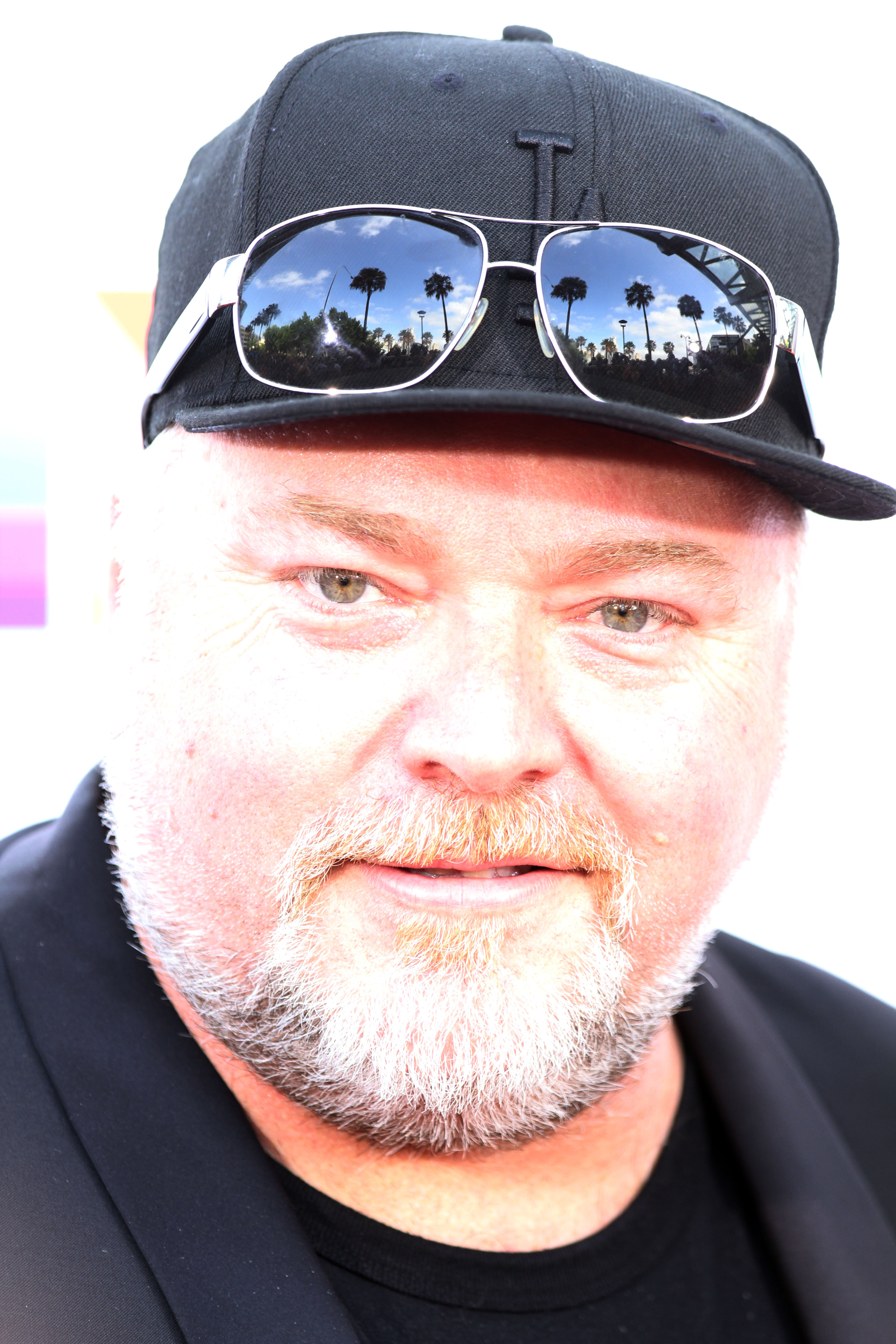
Kyle Sandilands (2010–2013)

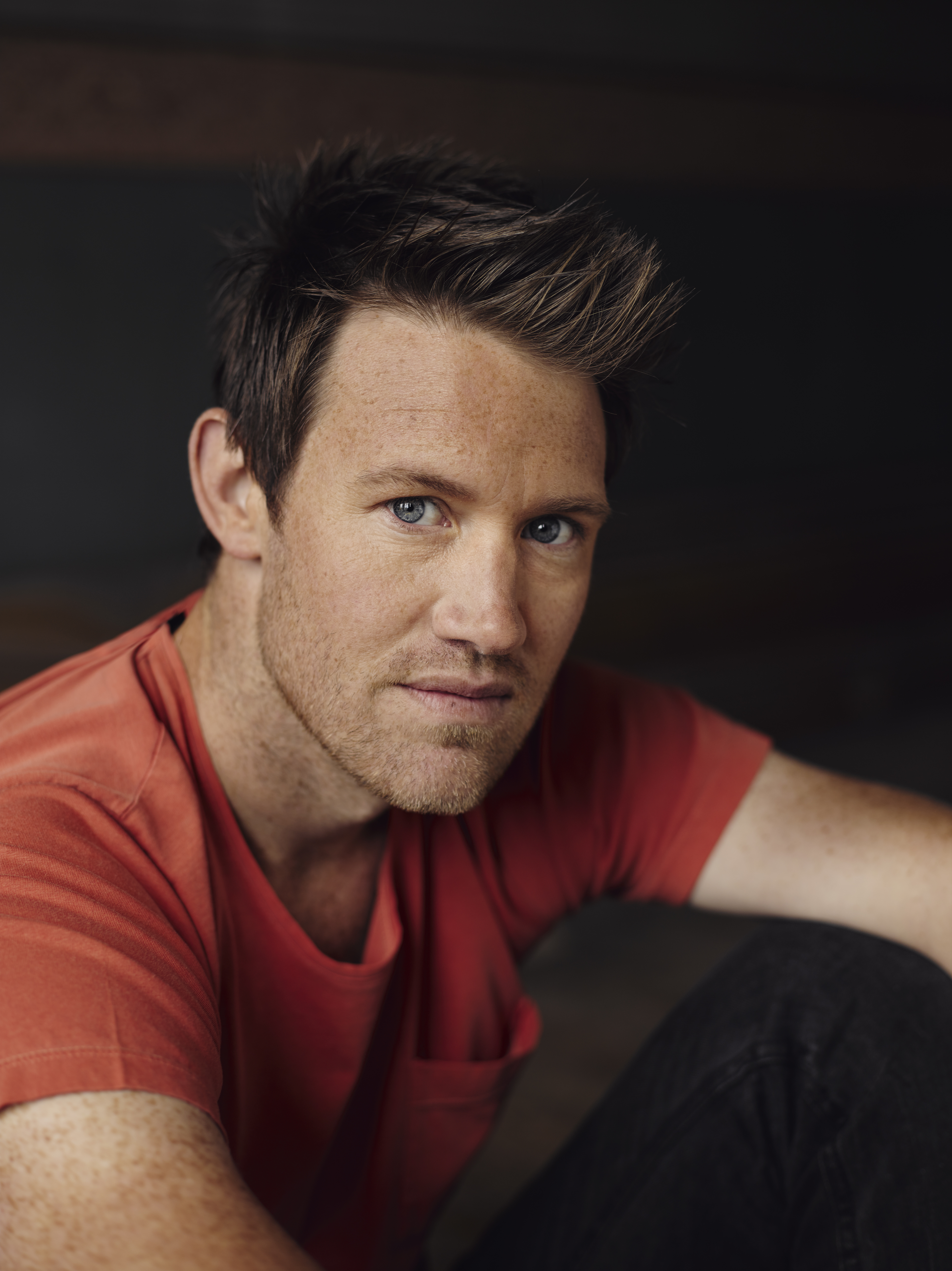
Eddie Perfect (2016)

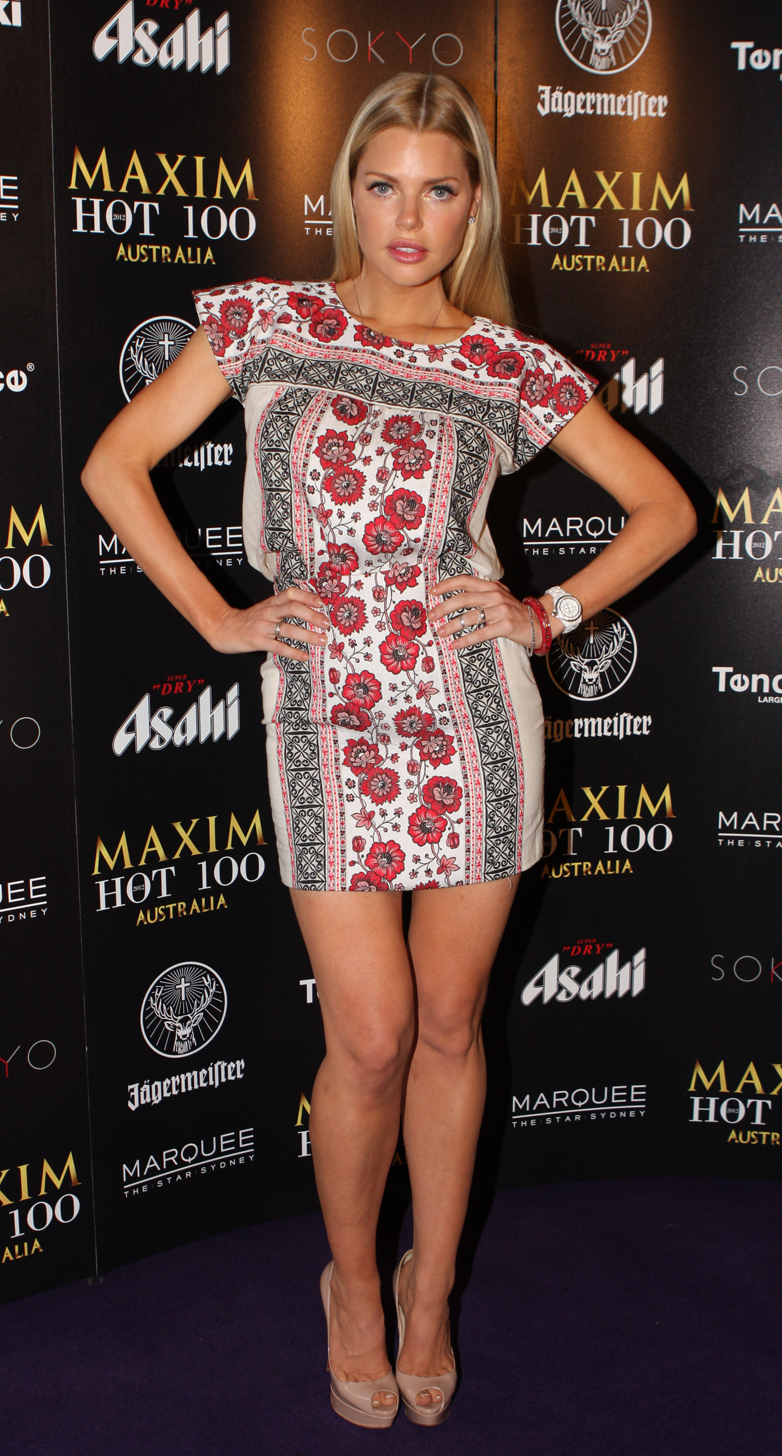
Sophie Monk (2016)

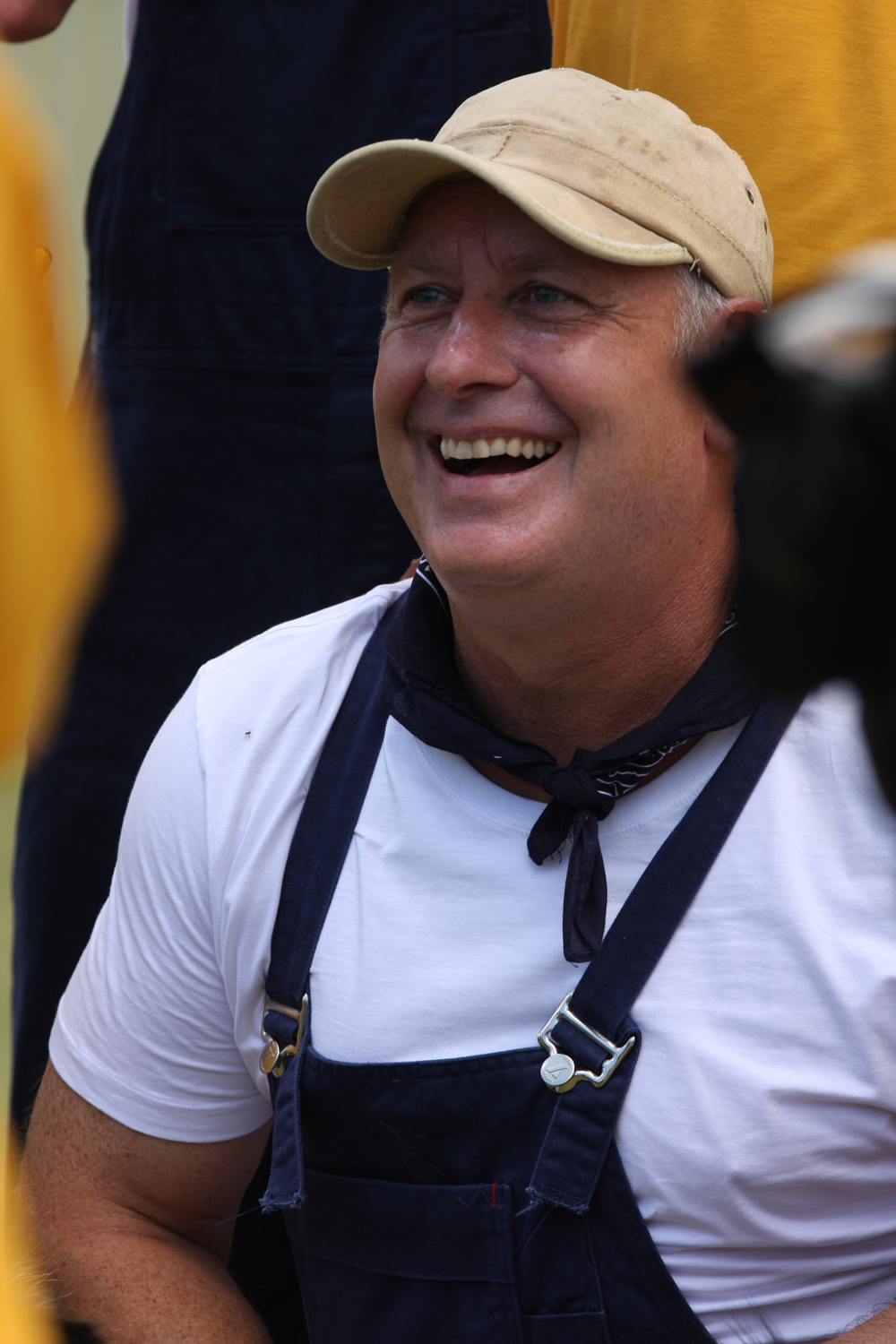
Ian Dickson (2016)

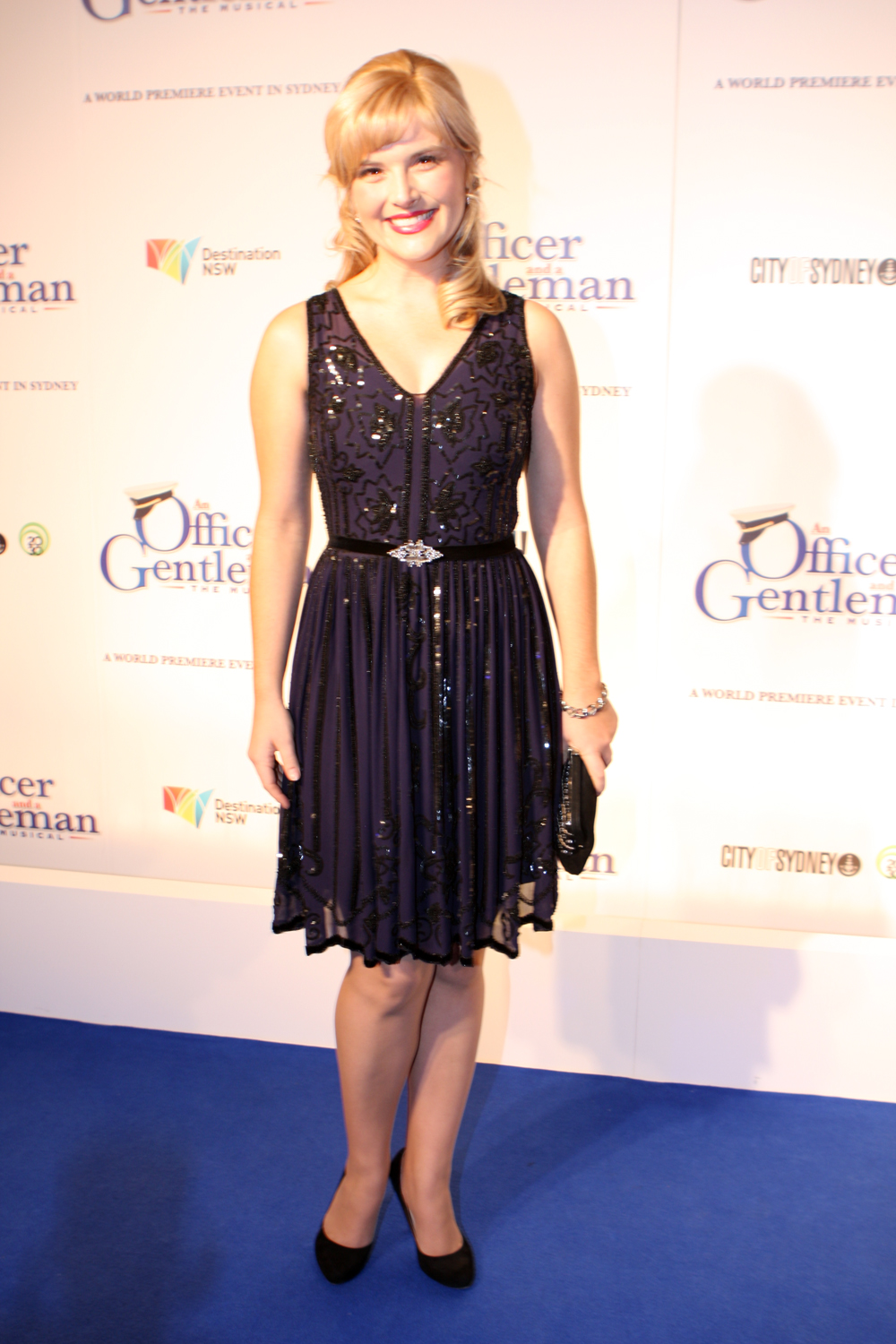
Lucy Durack (2019)

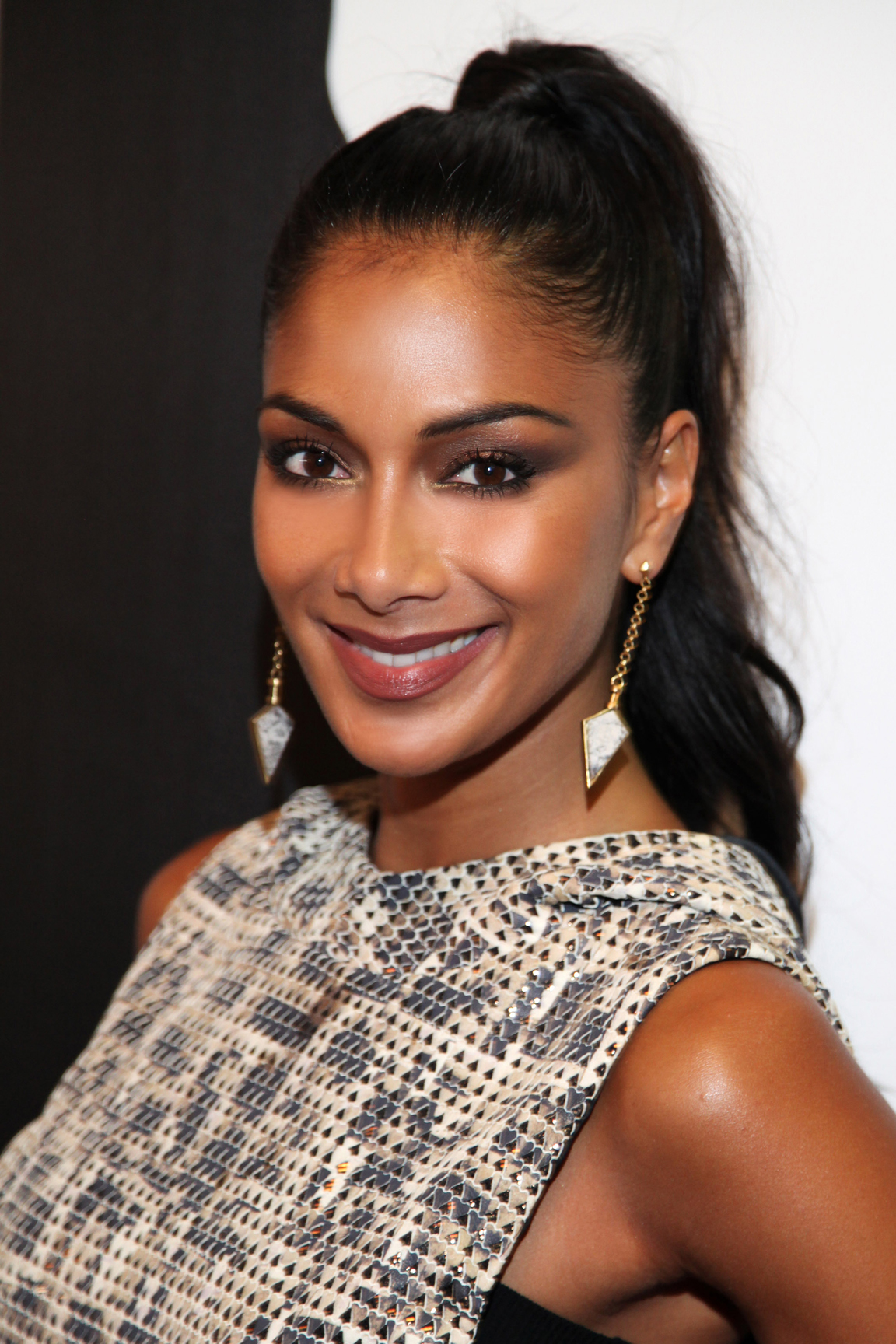
Nicole Scherzinger (2019)

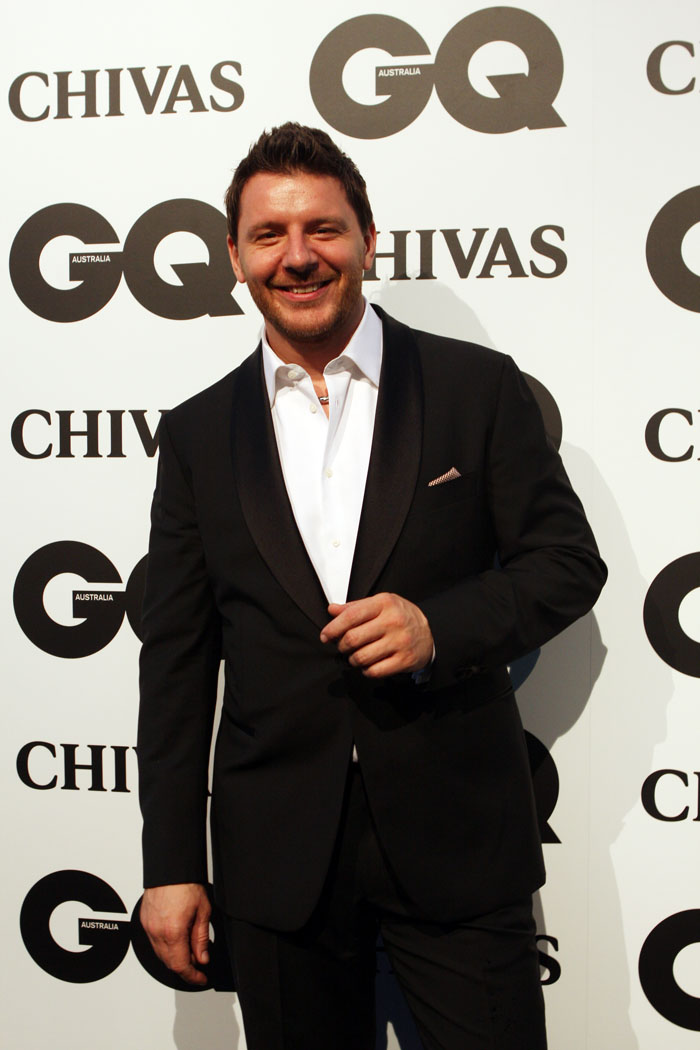
Manu Feildel (2019)

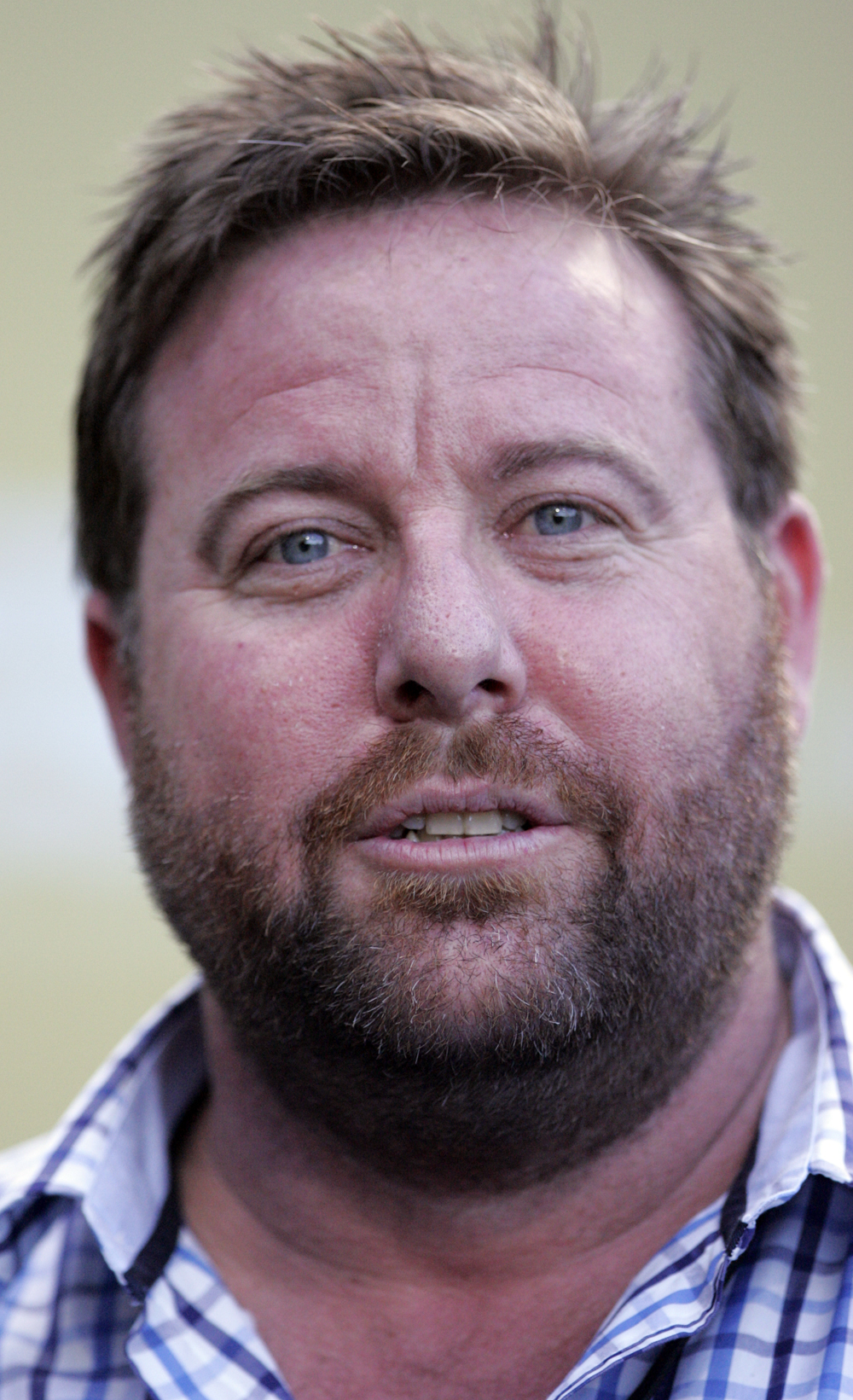
Shane Jacobson (2019, 2022)

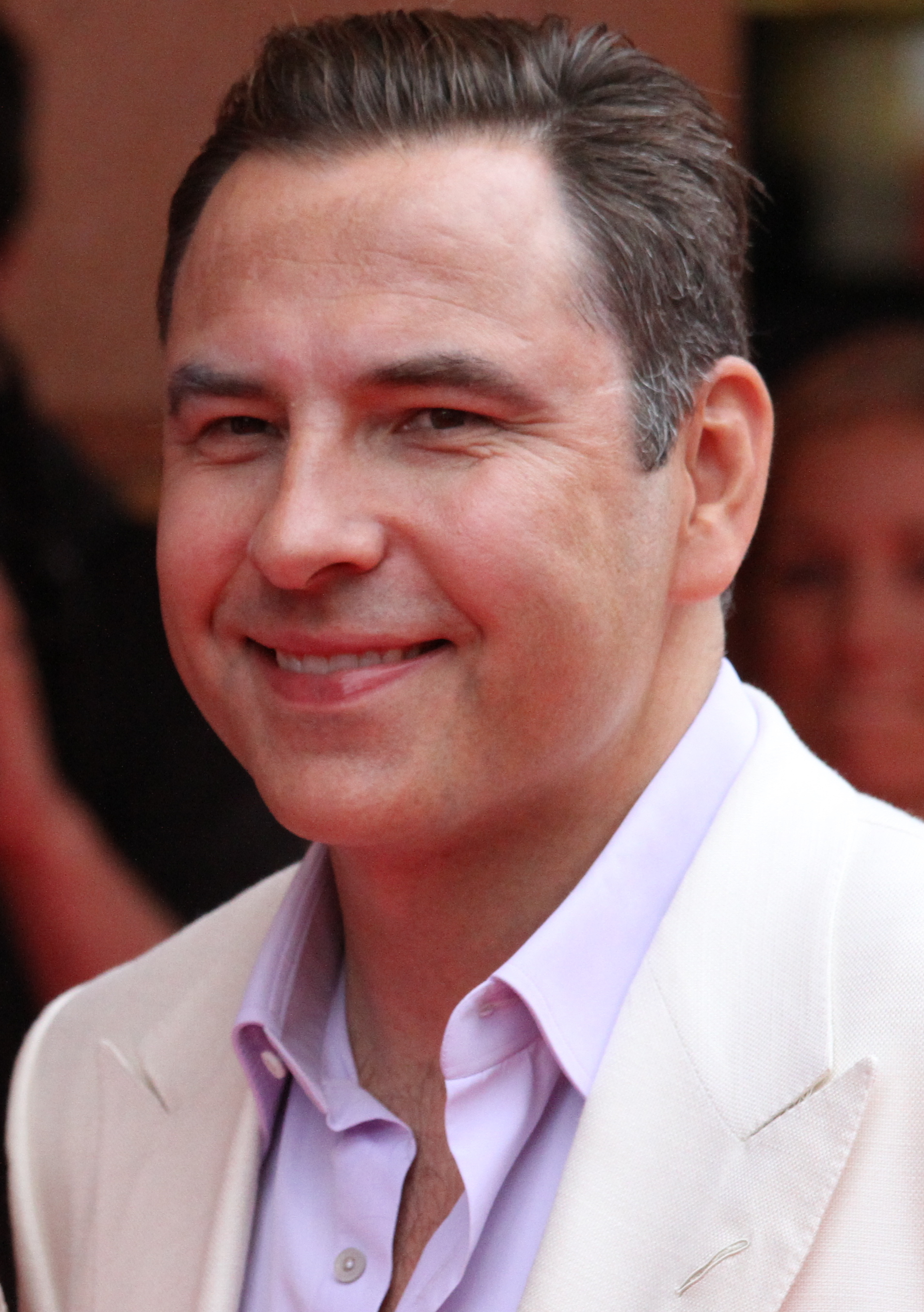
David Walliams (2022)

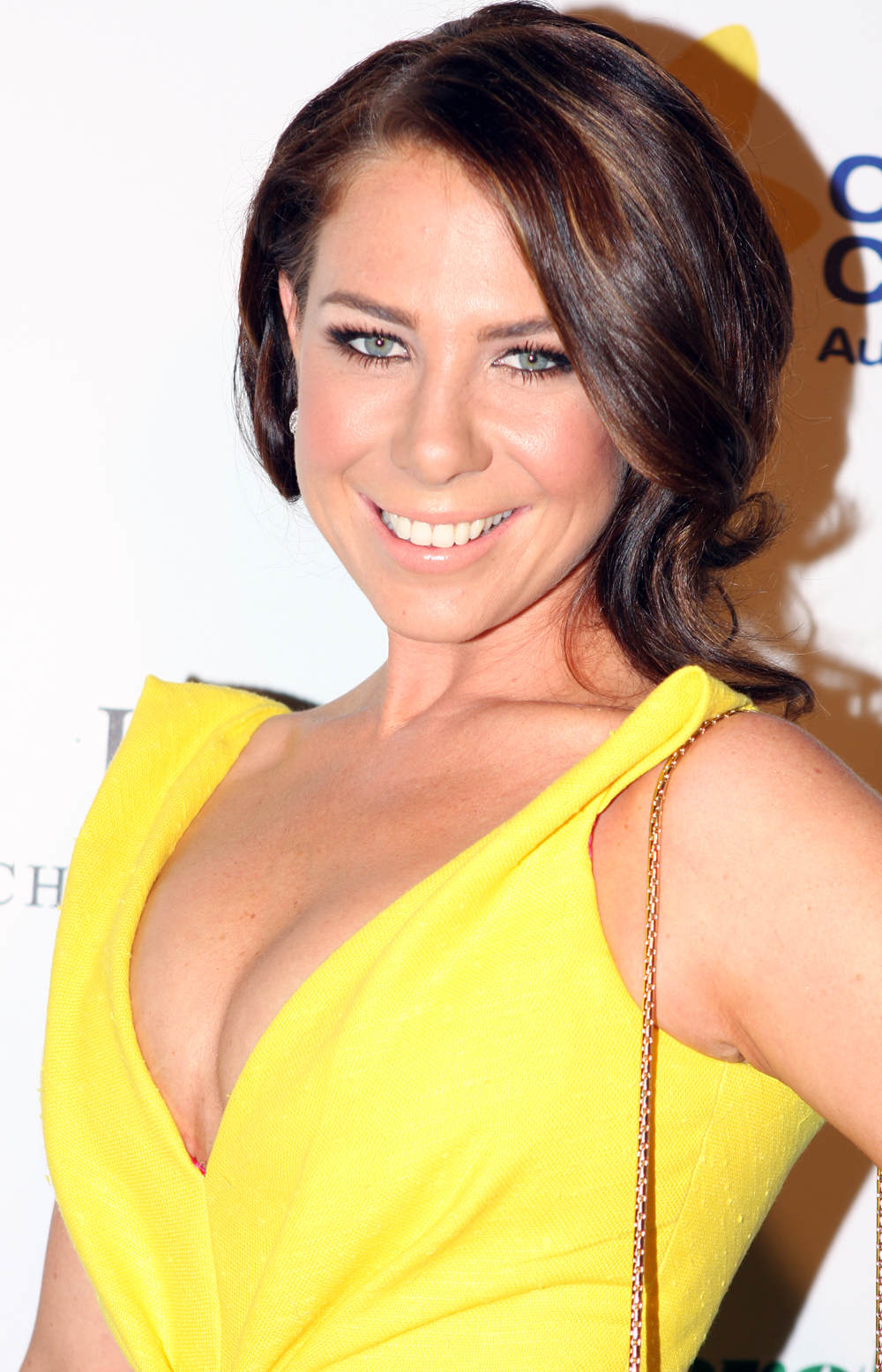
Kate Ritchie (2022)

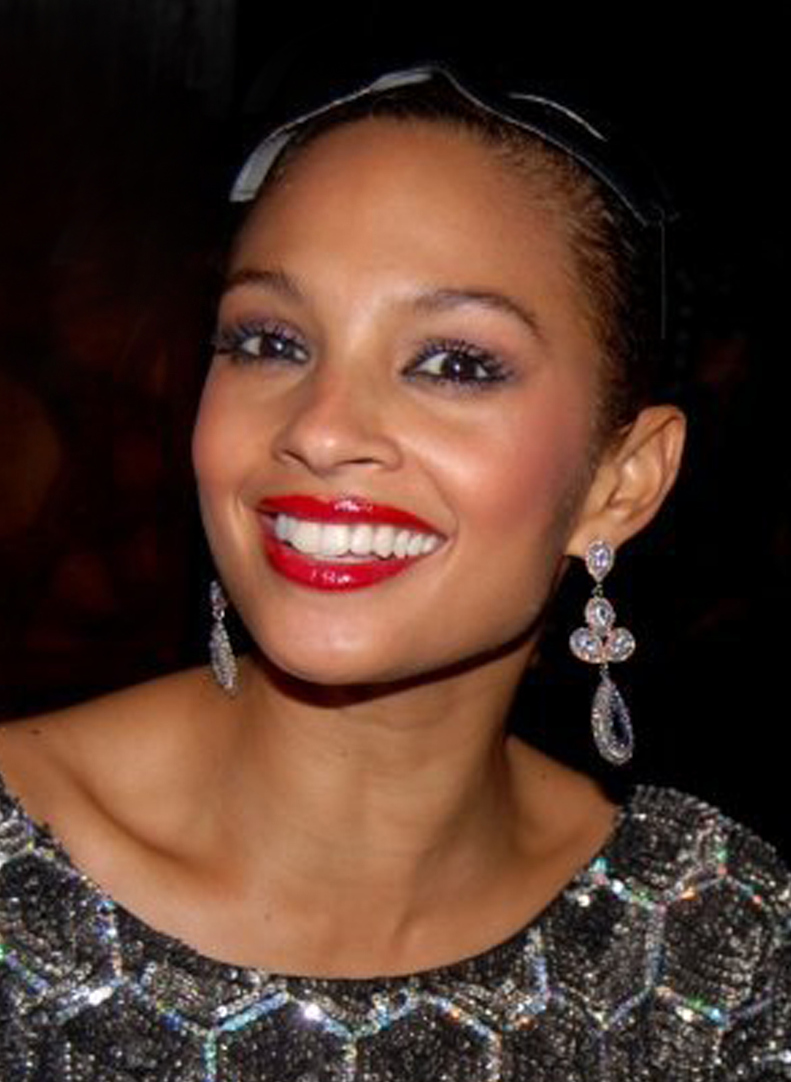
Alesha Dixon (2022)

== Series overview ==
Season	Start	Finish	Winner	Runner-up(s)					Host	Judges (chair order)				Network
Season	Start	Finish	Winner	Runner-up(s)					Host	1	2	3	4	Network
1	18 February 2007	28 April 2007	Bonnie Anderson	Herb Patten					Grant Denyer	Red Symons	Dannii Minogue	Tom Burlinson	—N/a	Seven Network
2	29 April 2008	1 July 2008	Joe Robinson	Jourdain					Grant Denyer	Red Symons	Dannii Minogue	Tom Burlinson	—N/a	Seven Network
3	4 February 2009	22 April 2009	Mark Vincent	Jal Joshua					Grant Denyer	Red Symons	Dannii Minogue	Tom Burlinson	—N/a	Seven Network
4	13 April 2010	15 June 2010	Justice Crew	Cam Henderson					Grant Denyer	Brian McFadden	Dannii Minogue	Kyle Sandilands	—N/a	Seven Network
5	3 May 2011	2 August 2011	Jack Vidgen	Cosentino					Grant Denyer	Brian McFadden	Dannii Minogue	Kyle Sandilands	—N/a	Seven Network
6	16 April 2012	25 July 2012	Andrew De Silva	The Wolfe Brothers					Grant Denyer	Brian McFadden	Dannii Minogue	Kyle Sandilands	—N/a	Seven Network
7	11 August 2013	10 November 2013	Uncle Jed	Greg Gould					Julia Morris	Dawn French	Timomatic	Geri Halliwell	Kyle Sandilands	Nine Network
8	1 February 2016	14 March 2016	Fletcher Pilon	Chris Tamwoy	King Social	Matt McLaren	Sisters Doll		Dave Hughes	Eddie Perfect	Kelly Osbourne	Sophie Monk	Ian Dickson	Nine Network
9	28 July 2019	22 September 2019	Kristy Sellars	Sienna Osborne		Olina Loau	Jennifer Anderson		Ricki-Lee Coulter	Shane Jacobson	Lucy Durack	Nicole Scherzinger	Manu Feildel	Seven Network
10	9 October 2022	20 November 2022	Acromazing	Ramadhani Brothers	Emo Majok	Walison Muh	Sienna Katelyn	Oleg Tatarynov	Ricki-Lee Coulter	Shane Jacobson	Alesha Dixon	Kate Ritchie	David Walliams	Seven Network

=== Season 1 (2007) ===
The first season of Australia's Got Talent premiered on Seven Network on 18 February 2007. The original judges were Dannii Minogue, Tom Burlinson and Red Symons. Singer Bonnie Anderson was crowned the winner of the first season on 28 April 2007, followed by Herb Patten finishing as runner-up.

=== Season 2 (2008) ===
The second season of Australia's Got Talent began broadcasting on 29 April 2008 and finished airing on 1 July. Minogue, Burlinson and Symons all returned as judges. The winner was announced as guitarist Joe Robinson, with Jourdain as runner-up.

=== Season 3 (2009) ===
Auditions for the third season started in late 2008 and successful contestants were notified in December 2008. Filming began on 15 January 2009.

The winner was declared on 22 April 2009. This grand finale followed the same format as the 2008 one: acts were eliminated in pairs, as well as each judge picking their favourite act to reappear on the show once more. Mark Vincent won the season, while Jal Joshua became the runner-up. On the grand finale, international opera singer and winner of Britain's Got Talent series one, Paul Potts performed live in the studio.

=== Season 4 (2010) ===
The fourth season of Australia's Got Talent returned on 13 April 2010. Grant Denyer continued as host, while radio DJ Kyle Sandilands and Irish singer Brian McFadden joined Dannii Minogue on the judging panel as replacements for Red Symons and Tom Burlinson. Auditions for the season took place throughout February 2010 in Sydney, Melbourne, Brisbane, Perth and Adelaide.

The show was revamped to look more like Britain's Got Talent, in terms of the stage and the shape of the X's used. The opening was also changed to look similar to Britain's Got Talent's opening, with Australian landmarks instead of British landmarks. Previously, the Australia's Got Talent opening was simply a display of the title. The live shows began on 11 May 2010 and ended on 15 June 2010, where dance troupe Justice Crew were crowned the winners. They were awarded a prize of $250,000, while runner-up Cam Henderson was awarded a runner-up prize of performing at the 2010 AFL Grand Final.

=== Season 5 (2011) ===
The fifth season of Australia's Got Talent returned on 3 May 2011. All judges (Dannii Minogue, Kyle Sandilands and Brian McFadden) returned for the season, including host Grant Denyer. The producer auditions took place in 16 cities, throughout New South Wales, Queensland, Tasmania, Victoria, South Australia, Western Australia and the Northern Territory. The successful acts from the auditions were then invited to a second audition in front of the judges and a live audience. These auditions began in Gold Coast on 19 February 2011, followed by three days in Melbourne from 25 February 2011. They also took place in Sydney on 12–13 March 2011, and ended in Perth on 20 March 2011.

The season was won by 14-year-old singer Jack Vidgen.

=== Season 6 (2012) ===
Auditions began in October 2011 and concluded in December 2011. The sixth season aired on the Seven Network from 16 April 2012 to 25 July 2012. Once again, Dannii Minogue, Kyle Sandilands and Brian McFadden returned as judges and Grant Denyer returned as host. Sandilands was sick during the Melbourne auditions, so Todd McKenney replaced him. McKenney took the place of McFadden during the finals showdown 2. The winner was singer Andrew de Silva with country rock band, The Wolfe Brothers becoming the runner-up.

=== Season 7 (2013) ===
Auditions began in March 2013 and concluded in June 2013. The seventh season aired on the Nine Network in 2013. Kyle Sandilands returned to the judging panel, while Dannii Minogue and Brian McFadden were replaced by three new judges Geri Halliwell, Dawn French and Timomatic who is the additional fourth judge. Julia Morris replaced Grant Denyer as the host. Mel B was originally due to join the judging panel, however an injunction sought by the Seven Network in the Supreme Court of New South Wales in March 2013 blocked her from appearing. The winner was "Funk/Soul/Jazz/Reggae" band, Uncle Jed, with band Greg Gould and The Chase becoming the runner-up.

=== Season 8 (2016) ===
On 8 July 2015, Nine announced that the show would be returning in 2016 for an eighth season. On Monday 4 January, it was announced that Season eight will be on Monday 1 February. It is the second season to air on Nine after it was axed in 2013. Auditions are open for September and October 2015. On 28 October 2015, it was announced that Sandilands, Halliwell, French and Timomatic have been replaced with a new panel of judges, they are Ian "Dicko" Dickson, Sophie Monk, Kelly Osbourne and Eddie Perfect. Morris will not return as host as she is committed to another show and will be replaced by Dave Hughes as the host. For the first time, it will now include the Golden Buzzer. It premiered on 1 February 2016, and ended on 14 March 2016. The winner was Fletcher Pilon

=== Season 9 (2019) ===
In December 2018, Seven Network announced that the series would return in 2019 to their network for a ninth season, after a three-year hiatus. In May 2019, Seven announced Nicole Scherzinger, Shane Jacobson, Manu Feildel and Lucy Durack as the series judges, and Ricki-Lee Coulter as the host. The season ran from 28 July to 22 September 2019.

Unlike previous seasons, there was no public voting at the semi-final stage. In the final, the judges chose a top four, which was then chosen by SMS votes from viewers in the eastern states. The final was pre-recorded, with four different endings filmed, one for each of the four possible winners. The winner of the season was pole dancer Kristy Sellars.

The entirety of the season was Pre-Recorded.

=== Season 10 (2022) ===
Season 10 was originally scheduled to air in 2020, with filming set to commence in March 2020. The Seven Network announced a judging panel of Shane Jacobson, Manu Feildel and new judges Sonia Kruger and Olympia Valance with returning host Ricki-Lee Coulter. Production was however halted due to Covid-19 restrictions.

It was then confirmed that season 10 would air in 2021. In June 2021, Seven announced a new judging panel featuring Shane Jacobson with new judges Neil Patrick Harris, Alesha Dixon and Kate Ritchie. However, due to COVID-19 restrictions in Sydney the season was postponed once again. During Seven’s annual upfronts, it was confirmed the series will air in 2022.

Season 10 began airing on 9 October 2022. The judging panel had another change from what was announced in 2021, with Harris being replaced by David Walliams. Ricki-Lee Coulter returned as host.

The season was filmed during June and July 2022. Auditions took place at the Sydney Coliseum Theatre, while the finals were filmed at the Riverside Theatre.

The winner of the season was dance group Acromazing.

== Viewership ==
Season	Network	Premiere date	Finale date	Episodes	Premiere ratings	Rank	Finale ratings (Grand final)	Rank	Finale ratings (Winner announced)	Rank	Average series viewers	Average rank
One	Seven Network	18 February 2007	28 April 2007	11	—N/a							
Two	Seven Network	29 April 2008	1 July 2008	10	1.358	#4	1.733^{[a]}	#1^{[a]}	1.587^{[a]}	#1^{[a]}	1.306	#2
Three	Seven Network	4 February 2009	22 April 2009	12	1.314	#3	1.510^{[a]}	#1^{[a]}	1.610^{[a]}	#1^{[a]}	1.342	#3
Four	Seven Network	13 April 2010	15 June 2010	10	1.493	#2	1.831^{[a]}	#1^{[a]}	1.939^{[a]}	#1^{[a]}	1.561	#3
Five	Seven Network	3 May 2011	2 August 2011	18	1.563	#2	2.316^{[b]}	#2^{[b]}	2.855^{[b]}	#1^{[b]}	1.702	#1
Six	Seven Network	16 April 2012	25 July 2012	21	1.196	#6	1.109^{[a]}	#4^{[a]}	0.998^{[a]}	#7^{[a]}	1.031	#8
Seven	Nine Network	11 August 2013	10 November 2013	14	1.044	#6	1.116^{[b]}	#4^{[b]}	1.391^{[b]}	#1^{[b]}	1.026	#5
Eight	Nine Network	1 February 2016	14 March 2016	13	0.865	#10	0.761^{[b]}	#12^{[b]}	0.908^{[b]}	#6^{[b]}	0.740	#10
Nine	Seven Network	28 July 2019	22 September 2019	13	0.875	#4	0.791^{[b]}	#4^{[b]}	0.771^{[b]}	#5^{[b]}	0.783	#6
Ten	Seven Network	9 October 2022	20 November 2022	11	1.136	#4	0.941^{[b]}	#5^{[b]}	-	-	0.895	#7

- ^{a} The Grand Final & Winner Announced are separated into 2 episodes
- ^{b} The Grand Final & Winner Announced are in one episode

== Awards and nominations ==
Year			Nominee	Result
2009	Logie Awards	Most Popular Light Entertainment Program	Australia's Got Talent	Nominated
2009	Logie Awards	Most Popular Presenter	Grant Denyer	Nominated
2012	Logie Awards	Most Popular Light Entertainment Program	Australia's Got Talent	Nominated
2012	Logie Awards	Most Outstanding Light Entertainment Program	Australia's Got Talent	Nominated
2014	Logie Awards	Most Popular New Talent	Timomatic	Nominated
2023	Logie Awards	Most Popular Entertainment Program	Australia's Got Talent	Nominated
