= Ulta Mixes =

Remix album by Wa Wa Nee
- Released: 1987
- Recorded: Studios 301, Sydney
- Genre: Synthpop, Pop music
- Label: CBS Records
- Producer: Jim Taig, Paul Gray

Wa Wa Nee chronology
Wa Wa Nee (1986)	Ulta Mixes (1987)	Blush (1989)

Ulta Mixes is the first remix album by Australian pop group Wa Wa Nee. The album included extended versions of four singles lifted from their debut studio album, Wa Wa Nee, and three previously unreleased tracks, including "Never Been So in Love", a track written and recorded for a Japanese TV series.

== Track listing ==
Side A
No.	Title	Writer(s)	Length
1.	"Gone" (12" Mix)	Paul Gray	5:15
2.	"Stimulation" (12" Mix)	Paul Gray	7:11
3.	"Sugar Free" (New York Mix)	Paul Gray	3:36
4.	"Never Been So in Love"	Paul Gray	4:32

Side B
No.	Title	Writer(s)	Length
1.	"One and One" (12" Mix)	Paul Gray	7:09
2.	"I Could Make You Love Me" (12" Mix)	Paul Gray	6:50
3.	"Sugar Free" (12" Oz Mix)	Paul Gray	7:11
