= Don't Stop (CDB song) =

Single by CDB

from the album Glide with Me
- B-side: "Remixes"
- Released: March 1996
- Genre: Pop, R&B
- Length: 3:44
- Label: Sony Music Australia
- Songwriter(s): Gary Pinto; Andrew De Silva; Ant Dale Vince Deltito Jason Catherine
- Producer(s): The Rockmelons

CDB singles chronology
"Let's Groove" (1995)	"Don't Stop" (1996)	"Good Times" (1997)

"Don't Stop" is a song by Australian boy band CDB, released in March 1996 as the fourth and final single from their debut studio album, Glide with Me (1995). The song peaked at number 28 on the ARIA Charts.

== Track listing ==
CD single (661108 2)

1. "Don't Stop" – 3:44
2. "Let's Groove" (Summer Groove) – 5:05
3. "Hook Me Up" (Wicked Mix) – 4:17
4. "Hey Girl (This Is Our Time)" (Sentimental Mix) – 3:53
5. "Don't Stop" (Remix) – 2:19

== Charts ==
Chart (1996)	Peak position
Australia (ARIA)	28
New Zealand (Recorded Music NZ)	25
