= Tailored for Now =

Studio album by CDB
- Released: 28 April 2017
- Genre: R&B
- Label: Warner Music Australia
- Producers: Gary Pinto, Andrew De Silva

CDB chronology
The Essential CDB (2010)	Tailored for Now (2017)

Tailored for Now (subtitled Eleven R&B Super Jams) is the third studio album by Australian R&B and pop group CDB, and first in 20 years. The album was announced on 10 April, with band member Gary Pinto stating: "This new album allows us to share with our audience a very special time in our lives. The artists we pay tribute to on this album and their culture was our inspiration. Having this opportunity to showcase these songs, put our own flavour into them and bring them into today is a really special thing."

The album was released on 28 April 2017.

== Reception ==
Professional ratings
Review scores
Source	Rating
The Daily Telegraph	3.5/5 stars

Cyclone Wehner from The Daily Telegraph said "CDB enjoyed a string of '90s hits back when radio still marginalised "urban music" and even its fans favoured US acts. Now the founding quartet have conceived a '90s covers set, tapping into booming nostalgia. CDB's renditions of "R&B super jams" like Montell Jordan's "This Is How We Do It" and Boyz II Men's pop ballad "End of the Road" are faithful, yet impeccably delivered. Best is when CDB subtly contemporarise songs - adding dance beats to Bobby Brown's "Every Little Step". They even credibly remake "Right Here" by SWV."

== Track listing ==
1. "If I Ever Fall In Love" – 1:08
2. "She's Got That Vibe" – 3:50
3. "Every Little Step" – 3:29
4. "Right Here" – 3:44
5. "The Floor" – 3:57
6. "This Is How We Do It" – 3:46
7. "End of the Road" – 5:31
8. "Just Got Paid" – 3:22
9. "I Want Her" – 3:38
10. "All My Life" – 4:08
11. "90's Chill Medley" (medley of "Can We Talk", "That’s the Way Love Goes", "I Like the Way (The Kissing Game)", "Candy Rain") – 6:42

== Charts ==
Chart (2017)	Peak position
Australian Albums (ARIA)	28

== Release history ==
Region	Date	Format(s)	Label	Catalogue
Australia	28 April 2017	CD; digital download	Warner Music Australia	5419768042
