= Yes I Am =

Yes I Am may refer to:

- Yes I Am (Melissa Etheridge album), 1993
- Yes I Am (Jack Vidgen album), 2011
- Yes I Am (film), a 2021 documentary film
- "Yes I Am" (song), a 2011 song by Jack Vidgen
