= Glide with Me =

Studio album by CDB
- Released: November 1995
- Recorded: 1994–95
- Genre: R&B, funk, pop
- Label: Sony Music
- Producer: The Rockmelons, Andrew De Silva, Ant Dale, Vince Deltito

CDB chronology
Glide with Me (1995)	Lifted (1997)

Singles from Glide with Me
- 1. "Hook Me Up" Released: October 1994; 2. "Hey Girl (This Is Our Time)" Released: 5 March 1995; 3. "Let's Groove" Released: October 1995; 4. "Don't Stop" Released: March 1996

Glide With Me is the debut studio album by Australian R&B and pop group CDB. The album was released in November 1995 on Sony Music Australia and it peaked at #6 in the Australia charts.

== Track listing ==
No.	Title	Writer(s)	Length
1.	"Let's Groove"	Maurice White, Wayne Vaughn	4:17
2.	"Girl Like You"	Andrew De Silva	3:41
3.	"Don't Stop" (rap by Jason Catherine)	De Silva, Bryon Jones, Gary Pinto, Jonathon Jones, Vince Deltic	3:52
4.	"Hook Me Up"	De Silva, B. Jones, J. Jones, Paul Gray	3:48
5.	"Hey Girl (This Is Our Time)"	De Silva, J. Jones, Gray	3:42
6.	"Glide with Me" (rap by Jason Catherine)	De Silva, Ant Dale, Pinto, Jason Catherine, Deltic	4:23
7.	"When You Need Somebody"	De Silva, Pinto	4:47
8.	"Love Is Gone"	De Silva, Gray	3:37
9.	"Kickin' Back"	De Silva	4:17
10.	"Bring Your Love Sherlock" (rap by Sherlock)	De Silva, Dale, Ian Calixto, Deltito	4:17
11.	"Who Needs Tomorrow"	De Silva	4:11
12.	"Let You Go"	Pinto, Ken Auriant	2:13

== Charts ==
=== Weekly charts ===
Chart (1995/96)	Peak position
Australian Albums (ARIA)	6
New Zealand Albums (RMNZ)	12

=== Year-end charts ===
Chart (1995)	Position
Australian Albums (ARIA)	63

== Certifications ==
Region	Certification	Certified units/sales
Australia (ARIA)	Platinum	70,000^{^}
^{^} Shipments figures based on certification alone.
