= Back Then (CDB song) =

Single by CDB

from the album Lifted
- B-side: "Sanctified"
- Released: December 1997
- Recorded: Sun Studios, Sydney
- Genre: Pop
- Label: Sony Music Australia
- Songwriter(s): Gary Pinto; Brad Pinto; B. Van Geyzel
- Producer(s): The Rockmelons

CDB singles chronology
"Good Times" (1997)	"Back Then" (1997)	"Let It Whip" (1998)

"Back Then" is a song by Australian boy band CDB, released in December 1997 as the second single from their second studio album, Lifted (1997). The song peaked at number 42 on the ARIA Charts.

== Track listing ==
CD single (665254 2)

1. "Back Then"
2. "Sanctified"
3. "Back Then" (Acoustic Version featuring Tommy Emmanuel)
4. "Back Then" (Instrumental)

== Charts ==
"Back Then" debuted on the Australian song chart at number 49. It peaked at number 42 the following week.

Chart (1998)	Peak position
Australia (ARIA)	42
