= So Good (Wa Wa Nee song) =

Single by Wa Wa Nee

from the album Blush
- Released: 13 February 1989
- Recorded: Studios 301, Sydney
- Genre: Pop
- Length: 3:58
- Label: CBS Records
- Songwriter(s): Paul Gray
- Producer(s): Paul Gray, Jim Taig

Wa Wa Nee singles chronology
"Can't Control Myself" (1988)	"So Good" (1989)	"I Want You" (1989)

"So Good" is a song from Australian pop group Wa Wa Nee. The song was released in February 1989 as the second single from their second studio album, Blush (1989). The song peaked at number 36 on the Australian ARIA Charts.

== Track listing ==
7" (CBS - 654546)

- Side A "So Good" - 3:58
- Side B "The Other Side" - 2:35

12"'

- Side A "So Good" (Umbrella of Love Mix)
- Side A "So Good" (Mixus Minimus)
- Side B "So Good" (Hydro-House Mix)
- Side B "So Good" (Goddess of Love Mix)

== Charts ==
Chart (1989)	Peak position
Australia (ARIA)	36
