= Hey Girl (This Is Our Time) =

1995 single by CDB

Single by CDB

from the album Glide with Me
- B-side: "Break of Day"
- Released: 3 March 1995
- Length: 3:41
- Label: Epic
- Songwriters: Andrew De Silva; Paul Gray; Byron Jones; Raymond Medhurst; Jonathan Jones
- Producer: The Rockmelons

CDB singles chronology
"Hook Me Up" (1994)	"Hey Girl (This Is Our Time)" (1995)	"Let's Groove" (1995)

"Hey Girl (This Is Our Time)" is a song by Australian boy band CDB, released in March 1995 as the second single from their debut studio album, Glide with Me (1995). The song peaked at number 14 on the Australian ARIA Singles Chart in May 1995. In New Zealand, the single became CDB's second number-one single, peaking at number one on the week of 21 April 1996 and earning a gold sales certification.

== Chart performance ==
In Australia, "Hey Girl (This is Our Time)" debuted at No. 49 in March 1995 before rising to a peak of No. 14 in May 1995, remaining in the top 50 for 11 weeks. In New Zealand, the song became the band's second number-one single in April 1996, following "Let's Groove", which peaked at number one in February.

== Track listing ==
CD single

1. "Hey Girl (This Is Our Time)" – 3:41
2. "Hey Girl (This Is Our Time)" (Sentimental mix) – 3:53
3. "Hey Girl (This Is Our Time)" (instrumental) – 4:10
4. "Break of Day" – 4:48

== Charts ==
Chart (1995–1996)	Peak position
Australia (ARIA)	14
New Zealand (Recorded Music NZ)	1

== Certifications ==
Region	Certification	Certified units/sales
New Zealand (RMNZ)	Gold	5,000^{*}
^{*} Sales figures based on certification alone.

== See also ==
- List of number-one singles from the 1990s (New Zealand)
