= Hook Me Up (CDB song) =

1994 single by CDB

Single by CDB

from the album Glide with Me
- B-side: "2 Nite I'm Yours"
- Released: 17 October 1994
- Length: 3:47
- Label: Epic; Dance Pool
- Songwriters: Andrew De Silva; Paul Gray; Byron Jones; Raymond Medhurst; Jonathan Jones
- Producer: The Rockmelons

CDB singles chronology
"Hook Me Up" (1994)	"Hey Girl (This Is Our Time)" (1995)

"Hook Me Up" is a song by Australian R&B/pop group CDB, released as their debut single. "Hook Me Up" was written by band member Andrew De Silva, Paul Gray, and Byron Jones, Raymond Medhurst and Jonathan Jones of the Rockmelons. Released in October 1994 as the lead single from their debut studio album, Glide with Me (1995), the song peaked at number 11 on the Australian Singles Chart and was certified gold.

== Track listing ==
CD single

1. "Hook Me Up" (radio edit) – 3:47
2. "2 Nite I'm Yours" – 5:19
3. "Hook Me Up" (Wicked mix) – 4:15
4. "Hook Me Up" (Swing mix) – 3:36
5. "Hook Me Up" (instrumental) – 3:45

== Charts ==
"Hook Me Up" debuted at No. 38 in Australia in November 1994, before rising to a peak of No. 11 in December 1994. The song remained in the top 50 for 14 weeks.

Chart (1994)	Peak position
Australia (ARIA)	11

== Certifications ==
Region	Certification	Certified units/sales
Australia (ARIA)	Gold	35,000^{^}
^{^} Shipments figures based on certification alone.
