= Wa Wa Nee =

Australian funk band

- Origin: Australia
- Genres: Funk, new wave, synthpop, pop rock
- Years active: 1982–1989
- Label: CBS
- Past members: Paul Gray; Steve Williams; Geoff Lundren; Elizabeth Lord; Chris Sweeney; Mark Gray; Phil Witchett
- Website: wawanee.com.au

Wa Wa Nee was an Australian funk, new wave, and synthpop band active from 1982 to 1989. Formed in Sydney by singer/songwriter Paul Gray and guitarist Steve Williams, the band achieved significant commercial success in Australia with their debut single "Stimulation" (1986), which peaked at number 2. Their self-titled debut album Wa Wa Nee (1986) was certified Platinum by ARIA. The band also reached international audiences when "Sugar Free" peaked at number 35 on the Billboard Hot 100 in the United States. Their second album, Blush, was released in 1989, after which the group disbanded. The band received multiple nominations at the ARIA Music Awards and the Countdown Australian Music Awards. Paul Gray, the band's lead singer, died on 24 April 2018.

== Career ==
Singer/songwriter Paul Gray and guitarist Steve Williams formed the band in 1982. They were joined by Geoff Lundren (bass), Elizabeth Lord (keyboards, backing vocals) and Chris Sweeney (drums) and signed with CBS Records in 1985. Mark Gray, Paul's brother, and Phil Witchett joined the group soon after and their debut single "Stimulation" was released in April 1986. The song peaked at number 2 in Australia. "I Could Make You Love Me" was released in August 1986 and peaked at number 5. In November 1986, Wa Wa Nee released their debut self-titled album which peaked at number 29 in Australia. Two more singles were released from the album, "Sugar Free" in December 1986 gave the band a third Australian Top 10 hit, and "One and One (Ain't I Good Enough)" in April 1987 which peaked inside the Top 20. "Sugar Free" was released in the United States in July 1987 and peaked at number 35 on the Billboard Hot 100. The song featured in the film, Cassandra. "Stimulation" was released as the follow-up single where it peaked at number 86. It was featured in the film Satisfaction. In 1987, a remix album, titled Ulta Mixes was released.

During the recording of the second studio album in 1988, keyboardist Phil Witchett died. In November 1988, "Can't Control Myself" was released as the lead single from the band's second studio album. The song peaked at number 31. Their second studio album, Blush was released in May 1989, and included two more hit singles, "So Good" and "I Want You". However, the album's commercial performance was disappointing, and the group disbanded later in 1989.

=== Later works ===
After the dissolution of Wa Wa Nee, bassist Mark Gray went on to work with Tania Bowra Band, with James Reyne and Indecent Obsession.

After Wa Wa Nee, Steve Williams was asked by Paul Christie to join The Party Boys performing on the single 'Do Wah Diddy'. Williams toured in James Freud's band and with Richard Clapton. Williams moved to Europe and soon found a new passion, teaching music. After returning to Australia, he was sought after, performing with the likes of Swanee, Ray Parker Jr, Real Life, Lee Kernaghan, and Brian Cadd. Williams soon became a long time member of Australian Led Zeppelin band Zep Boys and a mainstay in Choirboys with Mark Gable. In 2006, he worked with the Adelaide Symphony Orchestra (ASO) and in 2008 accompanied the ASO and Deep Purple's Jon Lord for an Australian tour. He has also been invited to perform for Australian touring musical productions of The Rocky Horror Picture Show, The Man from Snowy River, Singin In The Rain and Elvis The Musical. He currently tours with Matt Finish and is a member of Absolutely 80s featuring Brian Mannix (Uncanny X-Men), Ally Fowler (Chantoozies) and many others. In 2022, Williams was inducted into the South Australian Music Hall of Fame.

Paul Gray worked with Deni Hines, CDB, Kate Ceberano, Tina Arena and Bardot as a keyboard player, musical director, songwriter and producer. He appeared in the Countdown Spectacular 2 concert series in Australia between late August and early September 2007 as a performer and musical director. He sang two songs: "Stimulation" and "Sugar Free". He also appeared with 80s Enuff and Idols of the 80s. He performed Wa Wa Nee hits on 28 March 2010, at a fundraiser for the children of Jenin, a devastated area of the West Bank, Palestine. All funds went directly to the building of a pre-school in the area. He performed at local music venues in Melbourne in 2010, with fellow 1980s hitmakers, Scott Carne (Kids in the Kitchen) and Brian Mannix (Uncanny X-Men). Paul Gray supported Belinda Carlisle on some dates of her 2011 Australian Tour. Wa Wa Nee also supported Rick Astley during his 2012 and 2014 tour of Australia.

Paul Gray died of multiple myeloma on 24 April 2018, aged 54. The news was announced by his brother and fellow band member, Mark.

In 2023, Steve Williams launched a new band celebrating the songs of Wa Wa Nee, Steve Williams Plays Wa Wa Nee.

== Discography ==
=== Studio albums ===
List of studio albums, with selected details, chart positions and certifications
Title	Details	Peak chart positions		Certifications
Title	Details	AUS	US	Certifications
Wa Wa Nee	Released: 3 November 1986; Label: CBS; Producer: Jim Taig, Paul Gray, Chris Cameron	29	123	ARIA: Platinum
Blush	Released: 8 May 1989; Label: CBS; Producer: Jim Taig, Paul Gray, Robyn Smith	32	—	
"—" denotes releases that did not chart or were not released in that country.

=== Remix and compilation albums ===
List of remix and compilation albums, with selected details
Title	Details
Ulta Mixes	Released: 1987; Label: CBS; Producer: Jim Taig, Paul Gray; Remix album
The Essential Wa Wa Nee	Released: 15 October 2010; Label: Sony Music Australia; Greatest hits album

=== Singles ===
List of singles, with selected chart positions
Title	Year	Peak chart positions			Album
Title	Year	AUS	NZ	US	Album
"Stimulation"	1986	2	11	86	Wa Wa Nee
"I Could Make You Love Me"	1986	5	—	—	Wa Wa Nee
"Sugar Free"	1986	10	—	35	Wa Wa Nee
"One and One (Ain't I Good Enough)"	1987	19	—	—	Wa Wa Nee
"Can't Control Myself"	1988	31	—	—	Blush
"So Good"	1989	36	—	—	Blush
"I Want You"	1989	52	—	—	Blush
"—" denotes a recording that did not chart or was not released in that territory.

== Awards and nominations ==
=== ARIA Music Awards ===
The ARIA Music Awards is an annual awards ceremony that recognises excellence, innovation, and achievement across all genres of Australian music. They commenced in 1987.

Year	Nominee / work	Award	Result
1987	"Stimulation"	Highest Selling Single	Nominated
1987	themselves	Best New Talent	Nominated
1987	Paul Gray – Wa Wa Nee ("Stimulation", "I Could Make You Love Me")	Best Songwriter	Nominated
1987	Jim Tait for Wa Wa Nee by Wa Wa Nee	Engineer of the Year	Nominated

=== Countdown Australian Music Awards ===
Countdown was an Australian pop music TV series on national broadcaster ABC-TV from 1974 to 1987, it presented music awards from 1979 to 1987, initially in conjunction with magazine TV Week. The TV Week / Countdown Awards were a combination of popular-voted and peer-voted awards.

Year	Nominee / work	Award	Result
1986	Wa Wa Nee	Best Debut Album	Nominated
1986	"Stimulation"	Best Debut Single	Nominated
1986	themselves	Best Debut Act	Nominated
1986	themselves	Most Popular Australian Group	Nominated

== See also ==
- Wa Wa Nee Official Website
- List of 1980s one-hit wonders in the United States
