= Can't Control Myself =

Can't Control Myself may refer to:

- "Can't Control Myself" (Wa Wa Nee song), 1988
- "Can't Control Myself" (Taeyeon song), 2022
- "I Can't Control Myself", song by the Troggs, 1966
