= Let It Whip =

1982 single by Dazz Band

- Side A of US 7-inch vinyl

Single by Dazz Band

from the album Keep It Live
- B-side: "Everyday Love"
- Released: February 12, 1982
- Recorded: July 1981
- Genre: Electro-funk; post-disco
- Length: 4:42 (album version); 3:58 (7" single version); 6:22 (12" single version); 7:00 (instrumental)
- Label: Motown
- Songwriters: Reggie Andrews; Leon "Ndugu" Chancler
- Producer: Reggie Andrews

Dazz Band singles chronology
| "Knock Knock" (1981) | "Let It Whip" (1982) | "Keep It Live (On the K.I.L.)" (1982) |

"Let It Whip" is a 1982 single by Dazz Band and their biggest hit, peaking at number one on the R&B chart for five non-consecutive weeks. It is the lead single from their album Keep It Live. The single also reached number two on the Dance chart and number five on the Billboard Hot 100 chart. The song won the 1982 Grammy Award for Best R&B Performance by a Duo or Group with Vocals.

== Song ==
Co-written by producers Reggie Andrews and Leon "Ndugu" Chancler, performed by Dazz Band, "Let It Whip" features a percolating drum machine rhythm underneath live drums, and a Minimoog bassline, underneath an electric bass guitar.

== Chart history ==
=== Weekly charts ===
| Chart (1982) | Peak position |
|---|---|
| Australia (Kent Music Report) | 97 |
| Canada RPM Top Singles | 42 |
| US Billboard Hot 100 | 5 |
| US Billboard Hot Dance Club Play | 2 |
| US Billboard Hot Soul/Black Singles | 1 |
| US Cash Box Top 100 | 13 |

=== Year-end charts ===
| Chart (1982) | Rank |
|---|---|
| U.S. Billboard Hot 100 | 24 |
| U.S. Cash Box Top 100 | 79 |

== CDB version ==
"Let It Whip"

Single by CDB

from the album Lifted
- B-side: "Remixes"
- Released: April 1998
- Recorded: Sydney, Australia
- Genre: Pop
- Length: 4:59
- Label: Sony Australia
- Songwriters: Reggie Andrews; Leon "Ndugu" Chancler
- Producer: The Rockmelons

CDB singles chronology
| "Back Then" (1997) | "Let It Whip" (1998) | "After the Love Has Gone" (1998) |

Australian boy band CDB released a version in April 1998 as the third single from their second studio album, Lifted (1997). The song peaked at number 51 on the ARIA Charts.

=== Track listing ===
CD single (665254 2)

1. "Let It Whip"
2. "Back Then" (dance remix)
3. "Good Times" (MI:II remix)
4. "Let It Whip" (instrumental)

=== Charts ===
| Chart (1998) | Peak position |
|---|---|
| Australian ARIA Charts | 51 |

== Other covers and sampling ==
"Let It Whip" is featured the skateboard film DVS Skate More and in the films Grosse Pointe Blank (1997), Next Friday (2000), Adventures of Power (2008), Almost Christmas (2016), The First Purge (2018) and M3GAN (2022).

The song also plays during the "Aww Snap!" round of the NBC game show Ellen's Game of Games.

The song appears on the radio station Bounce FM in 2004 video game Grand Theft Auto: San Andreas.

Matt Bianco covered the song on their 1991 album Samba in Your Casa. Their version features a slower tempo and a short rap at the end of the song.

It has been covered by Boyz II Men, SR-71 on the soundtrack to The New Guy, and George Lam (titled as the Cantonese song "愛到發燒"). The song was also covered by the fictional a cappella group The Treblemakers in the 2012 film Pitch Perfect and is featured on the film's soundtrack.

Hip-hop group Treacherous Three sampled the song in their version called "Whip It", also released in 1982.

Christian hip-hop artist Lecrae sampled the song in his song "Let It Whip" (featuring Paul Wall) on his 2013 mixtape Church Clothes 2.

Justin Timberlake sampled the song in a remix version of his 2003 hit "Cry Me a River".

In 2012, the song was sampled by Purple Disco Machine in his song "Let It Whip".

In 2015, the song was sampled by LunchMoney Lewis in his song "Whip It!".

In 2023, the song was sampled by BigXthaPlug in his song "Whip It".
