= Inspire (Jack Vidgen album) =

Studio album by Jack Vidgen
- Released: 27 April 2012
- Recorded: 2012
- Genre: Soul; R&B
- Length: 47:01
- Label: Sony Music

Jack Vidgen chronology
Yes I am (2011)	Inspire (2012)

Inspire is the second studio album by Australian recording artist Jack Vidgen, also the winner of the fifth season of Australia's Got Talent.

It was released on 27 April 2012. Vidgen's voice had also broken in the time between his debut album and Inspire, making it sound noticeably deeper.

== Track listing ==
No.	Title	Length
1.	"Man in the Mirror" (Michael Jackson song)	4:33
2.	"What a Wonderful World" (Louis Armstrong song)	3:19
3.	"Lean on Me" (Bill Withers song)	3:43
4.	"Bridge over Troubled Water" (Simon & Garfunkel song)	5:15
5.	"What the World Needs Now" (Jackie DeShannon song)	3:21
6.	"Higher Ground" (Stevie Wonder song)	3:33
7.	"I'll Be There" (The Jackson 5 song)	4:20
8.	"True Colors" (Cyndi Lauper song)	3:24
9.	"You're the Inspiration" (Chicago song)	3:54
10.	"Oh Happy Day" (Edwin Hawkins song)	3:34
11.	"Imagine" (John Lennon song)	4:07
12.	"I Was Here" (Beyoncé song)	3:58
Total length:		47:01

== Charts ==
Chart (2012)	Peak position
Australian Albums (ARIA)	23
