= I Want You (Wa Wa Nee song) =

Single by Wa Wa Nee

from the album Blush
- Released: 8 May 1989
- Recorded: Studios 301, Sydney
- Genre: Pop
- Length: 3:26
- Label: CBS Records
- Songwriter(s): Paul Gray
- Producer(s): Robyn Smith, Paul Gray

Wa Wa Nee singles chronology
"So Good" (1989)	"I Want You" (1989)

"I Want You" is a song from Australian pop group Wa Wa Nee. The song was released in May 1989 as the third and final single from their second studio album, Blush (1989). It was the band's final release before disbanding later in 1989. The song peaked at number 52 on the Australian ARIA Charts.

In 1992, Kate Ceberano recorded a version for the Garbo (The Soundtrack From The Movie Starring Los Trios Ringbarkus).

== Track listing ==
7" (CBS - 654879)

- Side A "I Want You" - 3:58
- Side B "When I See You Dancing" - 2:35

12"'

- Side A "I Want You" (Extended U.S. Mix)
- Side A "I Want You" (Club U.S. Mix)
- Side B "I Want You" (The Real Mix)
- Side B "I Want You" (The Real Mix [Club Version])
- Side B "I Want You" (Percapella)

== Charts ==
Chart (1989)	Peak position
Australia (ARIA)	52
