= Let's Groove =

1981 single by Earth, Wind & Fire

Single by Earth, Wind & Fire

from the album Raise!
- B-side: "Let's Groove" (instrumental)
- Released: September 1981
- Genre: Post-disco; pop-funk; synth-funk
- Length: 5:39 (album version); 4:02 (single version)
- Label: Columbia
- Songwriters: Maurice White; Wayne Vaughn
- Producer: Maurice White

Earth, Wind & Fire singles chronology
"And Love Goes On" (1981)	"Let's Groove" (1981)	"Wanna Be with You" (1981)

Music video
- "Let's Groove" on YouTube

"Let's Groove" is a song by American band Earth, Wind & Fire, released as the first single from their eleventh studio album, Raise! (1981). It is written by Maurice White and Wayne Vaughn, and produced by White. The song was a commercial success, and was the band's highest-charting single in various territories. It peaked inside the top 20 in countries including the United States, New Zealand, United Kingdom, Canada and other component charts in America. In 1979 and the early 1980s, there was a severe backlash against disco music. In spite of this, the band decided to revive the disco sound that was included on their previous works and later records. Musically, "Let's Groove" is post-disco, pop and funk which includes instrumentation of synthesizers and keyboards along with live electric guitars.

== Overview ==
"Let's Groove" was produced by Maurice White for Kalimba Productions. With a duration of five minutes and thirty nine seconds, the song has a tempo of 126 beats per minute.

== Critical reception ==
Ken Tucker of Rolling Stone described Let's Groove as "city music" where "the horn section screams like a car running a red light." Record World praised the "deep, brawny bass line." Ed Hogan from AllMusic noted that White "brought in guitarist Roland Bautista and began co-writing, with Emotions member Wanda Vaughn and her husband Wayne Vaughn, a song that reflected the then-emerging electronic sound of the '80s. Not to be confused with the same-named hit by Archie Bell & the Drells, "Let's Groove" certainly was a change. Starting off with a robotic-sounding vocoder riff, it served up a more gritty-sounding EWF for the 1980s, laced with Brecker Brothers-supplied horn blasts that rival those of EWF's 1976 gold single 'Getaway'." People though said that the album's "biggest disappointment is Let's Groove, yet another gotta-boogie tune." Jordan Bartel of The Baltimore Sun noted that the song was "quite possibly the funkiest thing to come out of the early 1980s". Richard Williams of The Times wrote "Let's Groove, the bass-heavy new single, is a reliable pointer". Whitney Pastorek of Entertainment Weekly declared that "I actually love this song, especially the little computer voice in the background, like Pac-Man has come to life to boogie just for me!"

NME placed "Let's Groove" at number 16 on their Singles of the Year list of 1981. "Let's Groove" was also Grammy nominated in the category of Best R&B Vocal Performance by a Duo or Group.

== Commercial performance ==
The song peaked at number three in the US, becoming their 7th and last top 10 hit. It also spent eight weeks at number one on the Billboard Hot Soul Singles chart in late 1981 and early 1982 and was the second R&B song of 1982 on the year-end charts.

The single sold over a million copies in the US and has been certified gold by the RIAA as until the RIAA lowered the sales levels for certified singles in 1989, a gold single equalled 1 million units sold. "Let's Groove" was also certified platinum in the UK by the British Phonographic Industry.

== Music video ==
The accompanying music video of "Let's Groove" was the first ever to be played on Video Soul on BET. Heavy with vintage electronic effects, the video was directed and created by Ron Hays using the Scanimate analog computer system at Image West, Ltd.

The style of the music video influenced that of Bruno Mars' "Treasure".

== Personnel ==
- Writing – Maurice White, Wayne Vaughn
- Producer – Maurice White
- Assistant producer – Larry Dunn, Verdine White
- Programmer – Larry Dunn
- String, horn arrangement – Billy Meyers

Engineers

- Assistant engineer – Tom Perry
- Mixing engineer – Mick Guzauski, Tom Perry
- Recording engineer – Ken Fowler, Mick Guzauski, Ron Pendragon

Performers

- Saxophone – Tom Saviano
- Alto saxophone – Don Myrick
- Tenor saxophone – Andrew Woolfolk, Don Myrick
- Bass – Verdine White
- Cello – Frederick Seykora, Jerome Kessler, Larry Corbett, Marie Louise Zeyen, Paula Hochhalter, Selene Burford
- Concertmaster – Assa Drori, James Getzoff
- Drums – Fred White
- Guitar – Beloyd Taylor, Johnny Graham, Roland Bautista
- Keyboards – Billy Meyers, David Foster, Wayne Vaughn
- Percussion – Fred White, Maurice White, Philip Bailey, Ralph Johnson
- Piano – Larry Dunn
- Synthesizer – Larry Dunn, Michael Boddiker
- Trombone – Bill Reichenbach, Charles Loper, Dick Hyde, George Bohanon, Lew McCreary, Louis Satterfield
- Trumpet – Chuck Findley, Gary Grant, Jerry Hey, Larry Hall, Michael Harris, Oscar Brashear, Rahmlee Michael Davis
- Viola – Alan Deveritch, Allan Harshman, Gareth Nuttycombe, Pamela Hochhalter, Virginia Majewski
- Violin – Anton Sen, Arkady Shindelman, Arnold Belnick, Betty Lamagna, Brian Leonard, Denyse Buffum, Endre Granat, Haim Shtrum, Henry Ferber, Irving Geller, Jerome Reisler, John Wittenbert, Mari Tsumura Botnick, Marvin Limonick, Myra Kestenbaum, Nathan Ross, Norman Leonard, Reginald Hill, Ronald Folsom, Sheldon Sanov, Thomas Buffum, William Hymanson, William Kurasch
- Vocal – Beloyd Taylor, Maurice White, Ms. Pluto, Philip Bailey, Ralph Johnson
- Background vocals – Maurice White, Philip Bailey

== Accolades ==
Year	Publication	Country	Accolade	Rank
1981	NME	UK	Singles of the Year	16

== Charts ==
=== Weekly charts ===
Chart (1981–1982)	Peak position
Australia (Kent Music Report)	15
Belgium (Ultratop 50 Flanders)	9
Canada Top Singles (RPM)	7
Finland (Suomen virallinen lista)	6
France (IFOP)	2
Ireland (IRMA)	5
Netherlands (Dutch Top 40)	5
Netherlands (Single Top 100)	5
New Zealand (Recorded Music NZ)	2
South Africa (Springbok Radio)	8
Spain (AFYVE)	10
UK Singles (Official Charts)	3
US Billboard Hot 100	3
US Dance Club Songs (Billboard)	3
US Hot Soul Singles (Billboard)	1
US Cash Box Top 100	3
US Record World Singles	4

Chart (2012)	Peak position
France (SNEP)	123

Chart (2013)	Peak position
France (SNEP)	109

=== Year-end charts ===
Chart (1981)	Position
Netherlands (Dutch Top 40)	67
Netherlands (Single Top 100)	54
US Cash Box Top 100	17

Chart (1982)	Position
Australia (Kent Music Report)	100
Canada Top Singles (RPM)	50
US Billboard Hot 100	33
US Dance/Disco Top 80 (Billboard)	36
US Hot Black Singles (Billboard)	2

== Certifications ==
Region	Certification	Certified units/sales
Denmark (IFPI Danmark)	Platinum	90,000^{‡}
New Zealand (RMNZ)	3× Platinum	90,000^{‡}
United Kingdom (BPI)	Platinum	600,000^{‡}
United States (RIAA)	Gold	1,000,000^{^}
^{^} Shipments figures based on certification alone.^{‡} Sales+streaming figures based on certification alone.

== Sampling ==
Because "Let's Groove" was interpolated, Wayne Vaughn and Maurice White were credited as songwriters in "Feels" by Calvin Harris featuring Pharrell Williams, Katy Perry and Big Sean.

== CDB version ==
"Let's Groove"

Single by CDB

from the album Glide with Me
- Released: October 16, 1995
- Length: 4:17
- Label: Epic
- Songwriters: Maurice White; Wayne Vaughn
- Producers: Andrew De Silva; Ant Dale; Vince Deltito

CDB singles chronology
"Hey Girl (This Is Our Time)" (1994)	"Let's Groove" (1995)	"Don't Stop" (1996)

Music video
- "Let's Groove" on YouTube

In 1995, "Let's Groove" was covered by the Australian R&B/pop boy band CDB. In Australia, the song reached number 2 and was certified platinum for shipments of over 70,000 units. In New Zealand, it peaked at number 1 for three weeks and also received a platinum certification, indicating sales exceeding 10,000 copies. At the ARIA Music Awards of 1996, "Let's Groove" won the Highest Selling Single category.

=== Track listing ===
CD single

1. "Let's Groove" – 4:17
2. "You Will Be Mine" – 4:07
3. "Let's Groove" (Summer Groove) – 5:05
4. "Let's Groove" (instrumental) – 4:19

=== Charts ===
==== Weekly charts ====
Chart (1995–1996)	Peak position
Australia (ARIA)	2
New Zealand (Recorded Music NZ)	1

==== Year-end charts ====
Chart (1995)	Position
Australia (ARIA)	8

Chart (1996)	Position
Australia (ARIA)	80
New Zealand (RIANZ)	14

=== Certifications ===
Region	Certification	Certified units/sales
Australia (ARIA)	Platinum	70,000^{^}
New Zealand (RMNZ)	Platinum	10,000^{*}
^{*} Sales figures based on certification alone.^{^} Shipments figures based on certification alone.

=== Release history ===
Region	Date	Format(s)	Label(s)	Ref.
Australia	October 16, 1995	CD; cassette	Epic	
Japan	July 24, 1996	CD	Epic	

== Asia's Got Talent judges version ==
"Let's Groove"

Single by Asia's Got Talent judges
- Released: May 14, 2015
- Length: 3:32
- Label: Universal
- Songwriters: Maurice White; Wayne Vaughn
- Producer: David Foster

"Let's Groove" was covered by the Asia's Got Talent judges—David Foster, Anggun, Melanie C and Vanness Wu—and released as a promotional single on May 14, 2015, by Universal. It was released as a charity single for the May 2015 Nepal earthquake and all money raised was donated to the victims. This version was produced by David Foster.

=== Promotion ===
On May 14, 2015, the four artists performed the song in the final of first season of Asia's Got Talent. On June 4, the Asia's Got Talent released the behind the scenes video of the recording.

=== Release history ===
Country	Date	Format	Label
Hong Kong	May 14, 2015	Digital download	Universal
Indonesia	May 14, 2015	Digital download	Universal
Malaysia	May 14, 2015	Digital download	Universal
Singapore	May 14, 2015	Digital download	Universal
Vietnam	May 14, 2015	Digital download	Universal

== See also ==
- List of number-one R&B singles of 1981 (U.S.)
- List of number-one singles from the 1990s (New Zealand)
