= Can't Control Myself (Wa Wa Nee song) =

Single by Wa Wa Nee

from the album Blush
- Released: November 1988
- Studio: Studios 301, Sydney
- Genre: Pop
- Length: 3:36
- Label: CBS Records
- Songwriter(s): Paul Gray
- Producer(s): Paul Gray, Robyn Smith

Wa Wa Nee singles chronology
"One and One (Ain't I Good Enough)" (1987)	"Can't Control Myself" (1988)	"So Good" (1989)

"Can't Control Myself" is a song from Australian pop group Wa Wa Nee. The song was released in November 1988 as the lead single from their second studio album, Blush (1989). The song peaked at number 31 on the Australian ARIA Charts.

== Track listing ==
7" (CBS – 653162)

- Side A "Can't Control Myself" – 3:36
- Side B "Happy (Part 1)" – 2:35

12"'

- Side A "Can't Control Myself" (The Ean Sugarman & Stan Michael Remix) – 6:29
- Side B "Can't Control Myself" (AJA Smiley Remix) – 5:07
- Side B "Can't Control Myself" (Hysteria Mix) – 7:51

== Charts ==
Chart (1988/89)	Peak position
Australia (ARIA)	31
