= Wa Wa Nee (album) =

Studio album by Wa Wa Nee
- Released: 3 November 1986
- Recorded: Studios 301, Sydney
- Genre: Electronic, synthpop, pop
- Label: CBS Records
- Producer: Jim Taig, Paul Gray, Chris Cameron

Wa Wa Nee chronology
Wa Wa Nee (1986)	Ulta Mixes (1987)

Singles from Wa Wa Nee
- 1. "Stimulation" Released: April 1986; 2. "I Could Make You Love Me" Released: August 1986; 3. "Sugar Free" Released: December 1986; 4. "One and One (Ain't I Good Enough)" Released: April 1987

Wa Wa Nee is the debut studio album by Australian pop group Wa Wa Nee. Wa Wa Nee peaked at No. 29 in Australia and was certified platinum.

The album produced four top twenty singles in Australia, including "Stimulation", which peaked at No. 2.

At the 1986 Countdown Australian Music Awards the album was nominated for Best Debut Album.

== Track listing ==
Side A
No.	Title	Writer(s)	Length
1.	"One and One (Ain't I Good Enough)"	Paul Gray	3:16
2.	"Teacher"	Paul Gray	1:54
3.	"Stimulation"	Paul Gray	3:55
4.	"Jelly Baby"	Paul Gray	4:24
5.	"Gone"	Paul Gray	4:22

Side B
No.	Title	Writer(s)	Length
1.	"Sugar Free"	Paul Gray	4:15
2.	"When the World is a Home"	Paul Gray	3:57
3.	"Manchild"	Paul Gray	4:18
4.	"Love Reaction"	Paul Gray	5:00
5.	"I Could Make You Love Me"	Paul Gray	3:55

== Personnel ==
- Mark Gray – bass
- Chris Sweeney – drums, percussion
- Steve Williams – guitar
- Paul Gray – keyboard, vocals
- Peter Bondy – synthesizer
- Keith Casey – percussion

== Charts ==
Chart performance for Wa Wa Nee
Chart (1986–1987)	Peak position
Australian Albums (Kent Music Report)	29
US Billboard 200	123

== Certifications ==
Region	Certification	Certified units/sales
Australia (ARIA)	Platinum	70,000^{^}
^{^} Shipments figures based on certification alone.
