= I Could Make You Love Me =

Single by Wa Wa Nee

from the album Wa Wa Nee
- Released: 11 August 1986
- Recorded: Studios 301, Sydney
- Genre: Synth-pop
- Length: 2:52
- Label: CBS Records
- Songwriter(s): Paul Gray
- Producer(s): Chris Cameron

Wa Wa Nee singles chronology
"Stimulation" (1986)	"I Could Make You Love Me" (1986)	"Sugar Free" (1986)

"I Could Make You Love Me" is a song from Australian pop group Wa Wa Nee. The song was released in August 1986 as the second single from their self-titled debut studio album. The song peaked at number 5 on the Australian singles chart.

== Track listing ==
7" (CBS - BA3475)

- Side A "I Could Make You Love Me" - 2:52
- Side B "Meela Polarmay" - 3:47

12"' (CBS - BA12212)

- Side A "I Could Make You Love Me" (Metal Mix)
- Side B "Meela Polarmay" (Extended Mix)

== Charts ==
=== Weekly charts ===
Chart (1986)	Peak position
Australia (Kent Music Report)	5

=== Year-end charts ===
Chart (1986)	Peak position
Australia (Kent Music Report)	43
