= Blush (Wa Wa Nee album) =

Studio album by Wa Wa Nee
- Released: 8 May 1989
- Recorded: Studios 301, Sydney
- Genre: Pop rock, Synthpop, Pop music
- Label: CBS Records
- Producer: Jim Taig, Paul Gray, Robyn Smith

Wa Wa Nee chronology
Ulta Mixes (1987)	Blush (1989)	The Essential Wa Wa Nee (2010)

Singles from Blush
- 1. "Can't Control Myself" Released: November 1988; 2. "So Good" Released: February 1989; 3. "I Want You" Released: May 1989

Blush is the second and final studio album by Australian pop group Wa Wa Nee. Blush peaked at No. 32 in Australia. The album produced two top 40 singles in Australia.

== Track listing ==
Side A
No.	Title	Writer(s)	Length
1.	"Can't Control Myself"	Paul Gray	3:36
2.	"So Good"	Paul Gray	3:58
3.	"Giving Everything"	Paul Gray	4:08
4.	"One Day"	Paul Gray, Chris Sweeney	3:26
5.	"Never Been So in Love"	Paul Gray	4:43

Side B
No.	Title	Writer(s)	Length
1.	"I Want You"	Paul Gray	3:26
2.	"Brite Lites"	Paul Gray	3:52
3.	"Do it To Me"	Paul Gray, Mark Gray	3:09
4.	"Moral Inspiration"	Paul Gray	4:53
5.	"Blush"	Paul Gray	5:46

- Track 11, "Tossing And Turning" is a bonus track and was only on the CD release of the album.

== Charts ==
Chart (1989)	Peak position
Australian Albums (ARIA)	32
