= Sugar Free (Wa Wa Nee song) =

Single by Wa Wa Nee

from the album Wa Wa Nee
- Released: 1 December 1986
- Studio: Studios 301, Sydney
- Genre: Synth-pop
- Length: 4:27
- Label: CBS
- Songwriter: Paul Gray
- Producers: Paul Gray, Jim Taig

Wa Wa Nee singles chronology
"I Could Make You Love Me" (1986)	"Sugar Free" (1986)	"One and One (Ain't I Good Enough)" (1987)

"Sugar Free" is a song from Australian pop group Wa Wa Nee. The song was released in December 1986 as the third single from their self-titled debut studio album. The song peaked at number 10 on the Australian singles chart, and number 35 in the US on the Billboard Hot 100.

== Track listing ==
7" (CBS – BA3516)

- Side A "Sugar Free" – 4:27
- Side B "Wild Days and Windy Nights" – 2:59

12"' (CBS – BA12233)

- Side A "Sugar Free" (Dance Mix) – 7:08
- Side B "Sugar Free" ((The Spanking Dub Mix) – 3:50
- Side B "Wild Days and Windy Nights" – 2:59

== Charts ==
=== Weekly charts ===
Chart (1986–1987)	Peak position
Australia (Kent Music Report)	10
US (Billboard Hot 100)	35

=== Year-end charts ===
Chart (1987)	Peak position
Australia (Australian Music Report)	99
