= Jack Vidgen =

Australian singer and TV personality (born 1997)

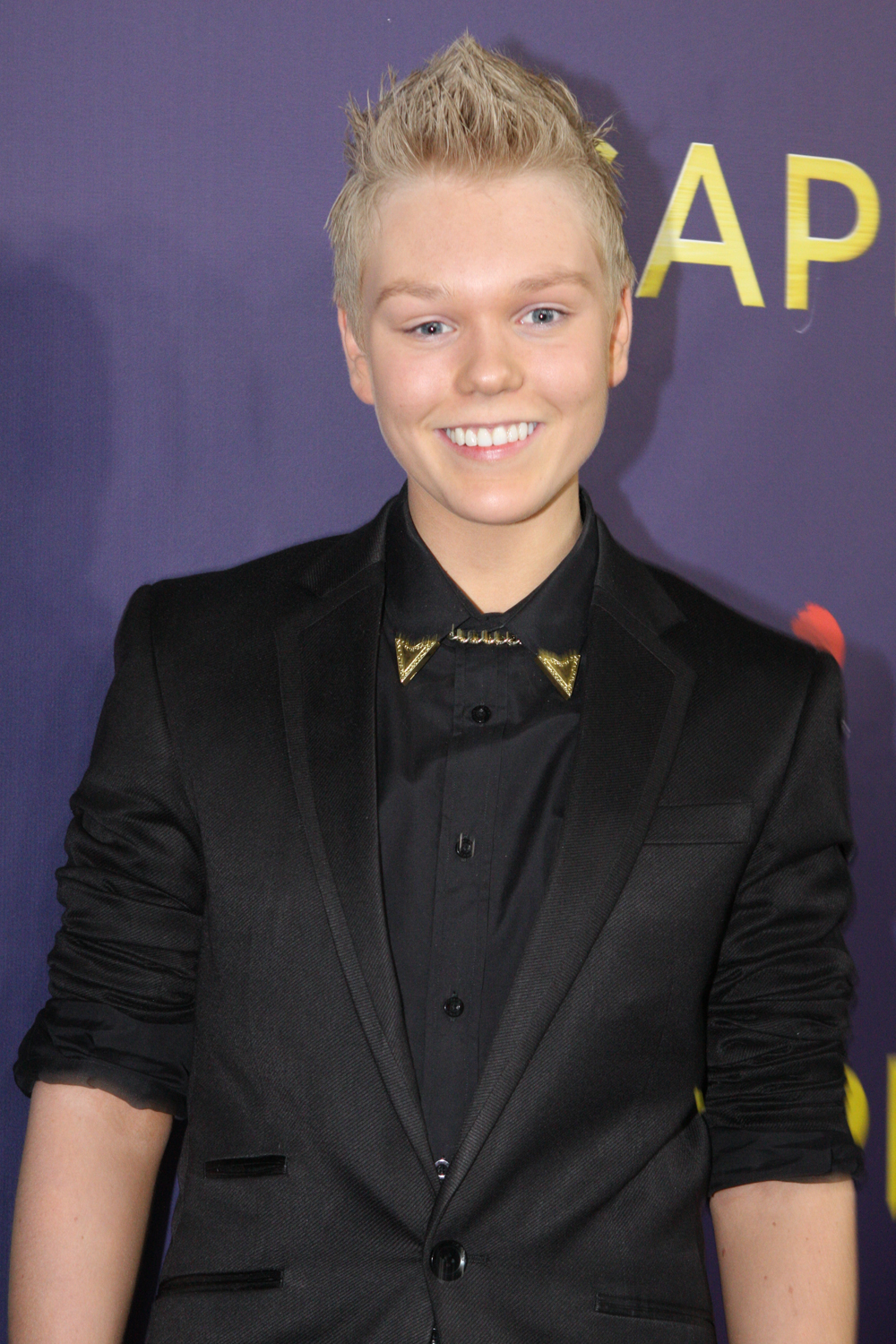
- Vidgen in 2012

Background information
- Born: 17 January 1997 (age 29); Mona Vale, New South Wales, Australia
- Genres: Pop; soul
- Occupation: Singer
- Instruments: Guitar, vocals, piano, violin, drums, harmonica, trombone
- Years active: 2011–present

Jack Vidgen (born 17 January 1997) is an Australian singer and television personality, best known for winning the fifth season of Australia's Got Talent as a teenager. He subsequently signed a recording contract with Sony Music Australia with his debut single Yes I Am, and studio album, of the same name, were released in August 2011. The album debuted at number three on the ARIA Albums Chart, and was certified gold. His second studio album, Inspire, was released in April 2012, reaching number 23 on the ARIA Albums Chart. In 2019 Vidgen took part in season 8 of Australian The Voice and was eliminated after the Semi-finals. He also appeared on America's Got Talent: The Champions. Vidgen has also appeared on I'm a Celebrity...Get Me Out of Here! in Australia.

== Early life ==
Vidgen is the son of Steve Vidgen and Rachel Hayton. From 2007 to 2010, Vidgen performed at various events in Sydney, including Schools Spectacular, Eisteddfod, and the local Christmas carols. He also taught himself how to play the piano and guitar. He attended Balgowlah Boys High School. Following his win on Australia's Got Talent in 2011, Vidgen withdrew from his high school to continue by distance education.

== Career ==
=== 2011: Australia's Got Talent ===
Vidgen auditioned for the fifth season of Australia's Got Talent in 2011, singing a rendition of Whitney Houston's "I Have Nothing". The performance earned a standing ovation from both the judges and the audience. Judge Kyle Sandilands said before the audition, "You're either gonna be amazing or dreadful – both I will enjoy", while judge Brian McFadden was so moved by the performance he ran up on stage to kiss Vidgen's cheek once it was over. The performance has received over 23 million views on YouTube. Vidgen was dubbed Australia's answer to Justin Bieber and inundated with international and local interest. He also attracted the attention of celebrity gossip blogger Perez Hilton, who posted several blogs of Vidgen's performances on his website.

Vidgen performed on the first semi-final show, singing a cover of "And I Am Telling You I'm Not Going" from the Dreamgirls soundtrack. After the performance, he earned another standing ovation from the judges and audience. Sandilands told Vidgen that he made him believe in reincarnation as he was sure Vidgen had a black woman inside him, while McFadden said Vidgen had one of the best voices he had ever heard. After winning the public vote from the first semi-final show, Vidgen progressed through to the next round, the final showdown. During this round, Vidgen performed a cover of Adele's "Set Fire to the Rain". After his performance, judge Dannii Minogue said, "Your voice lifts everybody who listens to it", while McFadden joked that he was jealous of Vidgen because he spelled the end for other guys in the music industry. Vidgen once again won the public vote, which made him progress through to the grand final. During this round, Vidgen performed an original song titled, "Yes I Am". A few days later, Vidgen was the centre of criticism over the song when it was revealed that it was co-written with two other people. Critics questioned how involved Vidgen was in the writing of the song. On 7 August 2011, Vidgen appeared on Sunday Night and said, "I sort of wrote the lyrics, and then I took them to vocal coach Erana Clark's studio, and we had the producer – I didn't write the music, I can say that, but I did write the lyrics."

Vidgen was announced as the winner of the season during the grand final decider show, which aired on 2 August 2011. He was awarded a prize of $250,000.

=== 2011–2014: Record deal, Yes I Am and Inspire ===
Following his win on Australia's Got Talent, Vidgen signed a recording contract with Sony Music Australia.Yes I Am was released for digital download on 3 August 2011, as Vidgen's debut single. The song peaked at number 35 on the ARIA Singles Chart. Vidgen co-wrote the gospel soul-inspired song with former Australian Idol vocal coach Erana Clark and producer A2, who also penned the song, "Fly", for Vidgen's debut studio album also titled Yes I Am. The album was rush-released on 19 August 2011. It contained cover versions Vidgen performed on Australia's Got Talent, which were all produced by musical director Chong Lim, as well as the two original songs. The album debuted and peaked at number three on the ARIA Albums Chart, and was certified gold by the Australian Recording Industry Association (ARIA), for shipments of 35,000 units.

Vidgen's second studio album, Inspire, was released on 27 April 2012. It featured more covers of songs from artists including Michael Jackson, Bill Withers, Cyndi Lauper, John Lennon, and Beyoncé. The album peaked at number 23 on the ARIA Albums Chart, failing to match the success of his debut album. Vidgen's second single "Finding You", which was written by The Potbelleez Ilan Kidron, was released digitally on 10 July 2012. He performed the song on Australia's Got Talent the next day. As of 2014, Vidgen is no longer signed to Sony Music Australia.

=== 2019–2020: The Voice and Australia Decides ===
On 2 June 2019, Vidgen returned to television on The Voice Australia. In an interview with Who magazine, Vidgen said "After winning Australia's Got Talent there was Facebook pages with death threats... life was hard..." adding "I stopped singing five years ago. I think I just burnt out. I just fell out of love with singing." Vidgen selected Guy Sebastian as his coach, eventually finishing as a semi-finalist before elimination.

The Voice performances and results (2019)
Episode	Song	Original Artist	Result
Audition	"Hello"	Adele	Through to The Knockouts
The Knockouts	"Love the Way You Lie (Part II)"	Rihanna ft. Eminem	Through to Battle Rounds
Battle Rounds	"Say Something"	A Great Big World	Through to live shows
Live show 1	"Rise Up"	Andra Day	Saved by Coach
Live show 2	"Dusk Till Dawn"	ZAYN ft. Sia	Saved by Public
Semi-final	"You Are the Reason"	Calum Scott	Eliminated

In December 2019, Vidgen was announced as a participant in Eurovision – Australia Decides 2020 in an attempt to represent Australia in the Eurovision Song Contest 2020. He competed with the song "I Am King I Am Queen", co-written by him and Andrew Lowden and placed eighth.

=== 2020–present: America's Got Talent and other television appearances ===
In January 2020, Vidgen appeared as a contestant on the second season of America's Got Talent: The Champions, however he didn't make the cut to the semi-finals. In January 2021, he appeared on the seventh season of I'm a Celebrity...Get Me Out of Here! Australia and was the first contestant to be eliminated. In October 2021, Vidgen was revealed as the "Kebab" on The Masked Singer (Australian season 3), making it to the semi-finals and placing fourth overall.

In 2022, Vidgen appeared as a celebrity guest contestant on the sixth season of Australian Ninja Warrior alongside athletes Emily Seebohm and Archie Thompson as a part of the celebrity challenge. He ended up winning the challenge, being the only celebrity to make it up the warped wall, and took home the $10,000 donation to his chosen charity the Trish MS Research Foundation. Later that year in 2022, Vidgen was announced as a contestant for the Australian adaption of the all new franchise The Challenge, titled The Challenge: Australia. Vidgen and his episode 2 teammate, Love Island Australia contestant Audrey Kanongara, were the second pair to be eliminated, exiting on the second episode.

== Personal life ==
Vidgen is gay.

In March 2014, it was reported that he had a lesion removed from behind his eye.

Vigden has struggled with substance addiction, and has received treatment through several drug rehabilitation programmes.

== Filmography ==
Television
Year	Title	Network	Role	Notes
2011	Australia's Got Talent	Seven Network	Contestant	Winner
2019	The Voice Australia	Nine Network	Contestant	Semi-finalist
2020	America's Got Talent: The Champions	NBC	Contestant	1st Eliminated
2021	I'm a Celebrity...Get Me Out of Here!	Network 10	Contestant	1st Eliminated
2021	The Masked Singer	Network 10	Contestant "Kebab"	4th place
2022	Australian Ninja Warrior	Nine Network	Guest contestant	Winner
2022	The Challenge: Australia	Network 10	Contestant	2nd Eliminated

== Discography ==
=== Studio albums ===
List of albums, with selected chart positions and certifications
Title	Details	Peak chart positions	Certifications
Title	Details	AUS	Certifications
Yes I Am	Released: 19 August 2011; Format: CD, digital download; Label: Sony Music Australia	3	ARIA: Gold
Inspire	Released: 27 April 2012; Format: CD, digital download; Label: Sony Music Australia	23	

=== Singles ===
List of singles, with selected chart positions
Year	Title	Peak chart positions	Album
Year	Title	AUS	Album
2011	"Yes I Am"	35	Yes I Am
2011	"And I Am Telling You (I'm Not Going)"	—	Yes I Am
2012	"Finding You"	—	Non-album single
2019	"I Am King I Am Queen"	—	Australia Decides 2020
2020	"I Have Nothing"	—	Non-album singles
2021	"Pray"	—	Non-album singles
2021	"Love Me Lonely"	—	Non-album singles
2021	"Goodbye"	—	Non-album singles

== Awards and nominations ==
Year	Type	Award	Result
2011	Nickelodeon Australian Kids' Choice Awards	Aussie Musos	Nominated
2011	IT List Awards	Single of 2011 ("Yes I Am")	Nominated
2011	IT List Awards	Album of 2011 (Yes I Am)	Nominated
2011	IT List Awards	Australian Male Artist	Nominated

Preceded by Justice Crew	Winner of Australia's Got Talent; 2011	Succeeded by Andrew De Silva
