= Chatswood High School =

Location
- Chatswood, New South Wales; Australia; 33°47′59″S 151°10′31″E

Information
- Type: Government-funded co-educational bi-modal partially academically selective and comprehensive secondary day school
- Motto: Latin: Per Gravia Ad Prospera (Through Hard Work We Prosper)
- Established: 1959; 67 years ago
- Principal: Robin Chand
- Years: 7–12
- Enrolment: approx. 2200 (2025)
- Campus: Suburban
- Colours: Navy blue and terracotta
- Website: chatswood-h.schools.nsw.gov.au

Chatswood High School is a government-funded co-educational partially academically selective and comprehensive secondary day school in Chatswood, a suburb on the Lower North Shore of Sydney, New South Wales, Australia. The school occupies extensive grounds on Centennial Avenue, which form part of the former Carr-Horden estate and include areas of remnant bushland.

Established in 1959, the school has approximately 1,500 students from Year 7 to Year 12. In 2023, the school ranked 63rd in New South Wales for the Higher School Certificate marks.

== History ==
The school had a cadet unit in the early days, for boys only. Girls wore wide-brimmed straw hats and gloves.

Chatswood was the first Australian school Stage Band to be invited to the Montreux Jazz Festival, in 1996.

As part of the Chatswood Education Precinct, planning went underway for a major redevelopment of the school, along with the nearby Chatswood Public School. Under this proposal, new buildings were constructed on both campuses, with some non-heritage buildings being demolished and rebuilt completely, while the IEC was moved to St Ives High School. The NSW Department of Planning, Industry & Environment has completed construction of the new buildings, with R block (near the front of the school, facing Centennial Avenue) having been completed earlier in 2022. S block was completed in December 2022, while T and Q blocks opened in April and May 2023 respectively. Building refurbishments in H and M blocks, alongside landscaping across the school was completed in late 2023.

== Marnie ==
In 1990, Chatswood High School's P & C purchased a country property for use as the school's Field Studies Centre. The property, Marnie, is a few kilometres from Rylstone, next to the Wollemi National Park. The property includes a cottage with accommodation for 10 people. It has served as a base for Duke of Edinburgh expeditions.

== Sport and school partnerships ==
Chatswood High School is a member of the North Shore 5 (NS5) Secondary Schools partnership, a collaboration between Killara High School, Ku-Ring-Gai Creative Arts High School, Saint Ives, and Turramurra High School. Chatswood Sport runs within the North Shore region that encompasses Turramurra, Killara, Pennant Hills, Cherrybrook Technology, St Ives, Carlingford and Galston High School.

== Notable alumni ==
- Liam Burrows, musician and singer
- Gordon McClymont OAM, agricultural scientist
- Carl Scully, former New South Wales Government minister
- Mark Taylor, former captain of the Australian cricket team
- Darren Percival, singer and performer
- Altiyan Childs, singer and songwriter

== See also ==
- List of government schools in New South Wales
- List of selective high schools in New South Wales
