= Liam Burrows =

Australian musician and singer

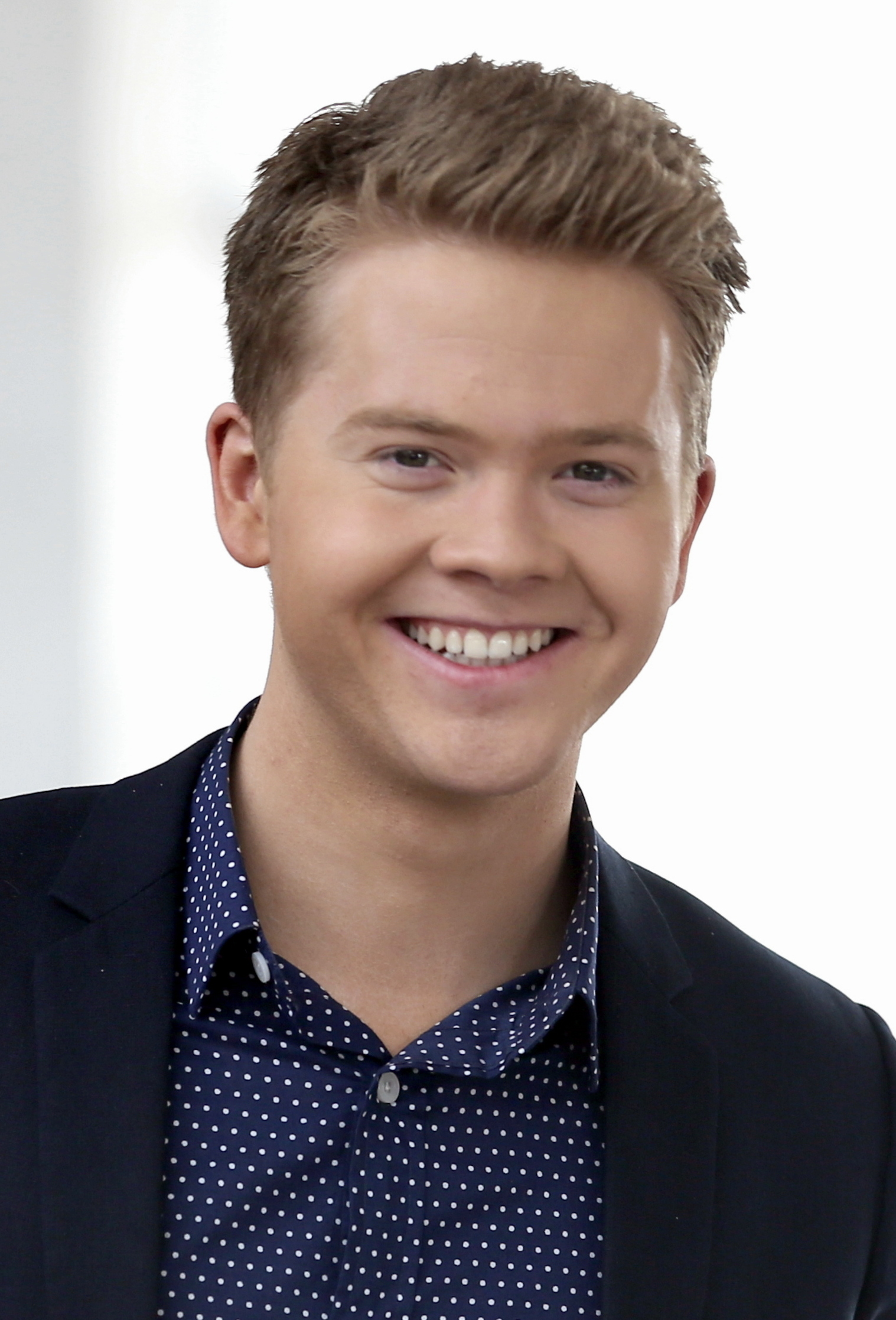
- Burrows in 2013
- Born: 22 February 1994 (age 32); Central Coast, New South Wales, Australia
- Education: Chatswood High School; National Institute of Dramatic Art (Open Program); Australian Institute of Music (BA Mus.)
- Occupations: Singer; musician
- Years active: 2008–present
- Awards: See Major awards and nominations
- Musical career
- Genres: Jazz; easy listening; adult contemporary; swing; big band; Broadway
- Instruments: Vocals, piano, trumpet
- Label: Skylark Records
- Website: www.liamburrows.net

Liam Burrows (born 22 February 1994) is an Australian musician and singer. He reached the grand final of the fifth season of Australia's Got Talent, and was awarded fifth place in the overall competition. His independently released debut album, All of Me, came out in 2011.

== Early life and education ==
Liam Burrows was born and raised in The Central Coast of New South Wales and comes from a musical family. Burrows' father Steve is ex-Australian Navy. His mother, Gemma is a high school music teacher. He has one younger sister. He played classical piano from the age of six, classical and jazz trumpet from the age of nine and sang at school events from the first year of high school. As a teen he performed with the Chatswood High School Stage Band at the Montreux Jazz Festival and has cited the school's music program as a major influence.

In 2014 Burrows completed the Musical Theatre Open Program at the National Institute of Dramatic Art (NIDA).

== Career ==
Burrows has headlined at jazz festivals around Australia including those at Manly, Noosa, Broadbeach, Adelaide Hills and Norfolk Island and performed at venues including the Crown Casino Melbourne, Jupiters Casino Townsville and Jupiters Hotel and Casino.

Burrows' appearances on television in Australia include Channel 7's The Morning Show, Channel Ten's The Circle, the Royal Children's Hospital Good Friday Telethon and the Channel 7 Perth Telethon. He performed as the opening act for the Pointer Sisters during their tour of Australia.

In 2011 he recorded his debut album with The Swing City Big Band. All of Me is a selection of songs including many from the Great American Songbook.

== Recognition ==
At age 14 Burrows won the Open Age Jazz Vocal Division of The Sydney Eisteddfod and was awarded The Central Coast Jazz League Scholarship for Most Promising Young Artist. In 2010 Burrows became the youngest vocalist selected to perform at Generations in Jazz.

In 2011 Burrows was again selected by James Morrison to perform at Generations in Jazz. At the age of 17 Burrows competed in the fifth season of Australia's Got Talent.

In 2012 Burrows competed in the Unsigned Only Music Competition, a talent search to locate artists who are not yet signed to record labels. Burrows came second in the Vocal Performance category. That same year, he was named Best Jazz Artist at the Australian Music Industry’s Musicoz Awards.

In 2013 Burrows won a Mo Award: The Johnny O'Keefe Award. In the same year he was a finalist in the jazz category of the MusicOz Awards.

In 2015, James Morrison presented Burrows with the Generations in Jazz Vocal Scholarship.

== Major awards and nominations ==
Year	Type	Award	Result
2015	Thelonious Monk Institute of Jazz	2015 Vocals Competition	Semi-Finalist
2015	International Unsigned-Only Competition	Vocal Performance Category	Second Place
2015	International Unsigned-Only Competition	Vocal Performance Category	Honourable Mention
2015	International Unsigned-Only Competition	Vocal Performance Category	Honourable Mention
2015	Generations in Jazz	Vocal Scholarship	Winner
2014	International Unsigned Only Competition	Vocal Performance Category	Second Place
2014	International Unsigned Only Competition	Vocal Performance Category	Honorable Mention
2013	MusicOz Awards	Jazz Category	Finalist
2013	International Unsigned Only Competition	Vocal Performance Category	Honorable Mention
2013	Mo Awards	Johnny O'Keefe Encouragement Award	Winner
2012	MusicOz Awards	Best Jazz Artist – Jazz Category	Winner
2012	International Unsigned Only Competition	Vocal Performance Category	Second place
2011	Australia's Got Talent	Grand Finalist	5th place
2010	Generations in Jazz	Vocal Scholarship	Finalist
2010	Mo Awards	Best New Talent	Winner
2008	Sydney Eisteddfod	Best Jazz Vocalist	Winner

== Charitable affiliations ==
Burrows is a youth ambassador for the following organisations:

- Angels Hope – Australian Anti-Bullying Organisation
- Australian Children’s Music Foundation

== Discography ==
=== Albums ===
Title	Details
All of Me	Released: 2011; Label: Skylark
