= Lifted (CDB album) =

Studio album by CDB
- Released: November 1997
- Genre: R&B
- Label: Sony Music
- Producer: The Rockmelons, M1:11, Jack Kugell, Steve Kipner

CDB chronology
Glide with Me (1995)	Lifted (1997)	The Essential CDB (2010)

Singles from Lifted
- 1. "Good Times" Released: August 1997; 2. "Back Then" Released: December 1997; 3. "Let It Whip" Released: April 1998; 4. "So Badd" Released: 1999

Lifted is the second studio album by Australian R&B and pop group CDB. The album was released in November 1997 and debuted and peaked at No. 45 on the Australia charts. The album was reissued in 1998 with two additional tracks.

== Track listing ==
Lifted
No.	Title	Writer(s)	Length
1.	"Good Times"	Andrew De Silva, Byron Jones, Raymond Medhurst, Jason Catherine, Danny Dharumasena, Neil Raymond, Jonathan Jones	3:59
2.	"Down for Love"		4:25
3.	"So Badd"		3:54
4.	"Back Then"	Gary Pinto, Brad Pinto, B. Van Geyzel	4:01
5.	"Hypnotic"		3:51
6.	"Let It Whip"	Reggie Andrews, Leon "Ndugu" Chancler	4:59
7.	"Never Thought"		3:53
8.	"Lay My Love On You"		3:45
9.	"Lifted"		3:47
10.	"Lessons"		4:23
11.	"Last Dance"		4:47

Lifted Reissue (1998)
No.	Title	Writer(s)	Length
12.	"After the Love Has Gone" (with Tommy Emmanuel)	Bill Champlin, David Foster, Jay Graydon	4:19
13.	"Live for Love"

== Charts ==
Chart (1997)	Peak position
Australian Albums (ARIA)	45
