= Good Times (CDB song) =

Single by CDB

from the album Lifted
- B-side: "When You Need Somebody"
- Released: August 1997
- Recorded: Sun Studios, Sydney
- Genre: Pop
- Length: 4:00
- Label: Sony Music Australia
- Songwriter(s): Andrew De Silva; Byron Jones; Raymond Medhurst; Jason Catherine; Danny Dharumasena; Neil Raymond; Jonathan Jones
- Producer(s): The Rockmelons

CDB singles chronology
"Don't Stop" (1996)	"Good Times" (1997)	"Back Then" (1997)

"Good Times" is a song by Australian boy band CDB, released in August 1997 as the lead single from their second studio album, Lifted (1997). The song peaked at number 28 on the ARIA Charts.

== Track listing ==
CD single (664738 2)

1. "Good Times" – 4:00
2. "When You Need Somebody" (Rockmelons Mix) – 3:56
3. "Good Times" (M1:11 Remix) – 4:11
4. "Good Times" (Instrumental) – 3:59

== Charts ==
"Good Times" debuted in Australia at number 46. It peaked at number 28 in September 1997. It remained in the top 50 for 12 weeks.

Chart (1997)	Peak position
Australia (ARIA)	28
