= Yes I Am (Jack Vidgen album) =

Yes I am

Studio album by Jack Vidgen
- Released: 19 August 2011
- Recorded: 2011
- Genre: Pop, soul, R&B
- Length: 46:19
- Label: Sony Music

Jack Vidgen chronology
Yes I am (2011)	Inspire (2012)

Singles from Yes I Am
- 1. "Yes I Am" Released: 3 August 2011

Yes I Am is the debut studio album by Australian recording artist Jack Vidgen, who was also the winner of the fifth season of Australia's Got Talent. It was released through Sony Music Australia on 19 August 2011.

== Track listing ==
No.	Title	Length
1.	"Yes I Am"	3:37
2.	"And I Am Telling You I'm Not Going" (Jennifer Holliday song)	2:24
3.	"Set Fire to the Rain" (Adele song)	3:43
4.	"Who's Lovin' You?" (The Miracles song)	5:07
5.	"Because You Loved Me" (Céline Dion song)	4:34
6.	"River Deep Mountain High" (Ike & Tina Turner song)	3:42
7.	"Think" (Aretha Franklin song)	3:07
8.	"Hero" (Mariah Carey song)	4:19
9.	"Glitter in the Air" (Pink song)	3:43
10.	"I Have Nothing" (Whitney Houston song)	4:50
11.	"Fly!"	3:28
12.	"Lovin' You" (Minnie Riperton song)	3:45

== Charts and certification ==
=== Weekly charts ===
Chart (2011)	Peak position
Australian Albums (ARIA)	3

=== Year-end charts ===
Chart (2011)	Position
Australian Albums (ARIA)	80

=== Certification ===
Country	Certification
Australia (ARIA)	Gold
