= One and One (Ain't I Good Enough) =

Single by Wa Wa Nee

from the album Wa Wa Nee
- Released: April 1987
- Studio: Studios 301, Sydney
- Genre: Pop
- Length: 3:16
- Label: CBS Records
- Songwriter(s): Paul Gray
- Producer(s): Paul Gray, Jim Taig

Wa Wa Nee singles chronology
"Sugar Free" (1986)	"One and One (Ain't I Good Enough)" (1987)	"Can't Control Myself" (1988)

"One and One (Ain't I Good Enough)" is a song from Australian pop group Wa Wa Nee. The song was released in April 1987 on 2x7" Vinyl Single as the fourth and final single from their self-titled debut studio album, (1986). The song peaked at number 19 on the Australian Kent Music Report.

The group performed the song live on Countdown.

== Track listing ==
7" (CBS – 650726)

- Side A "One and One (Ain't I Good Enough)" – 3:16
- Side B "Rubber Cookie" – 4:00
- Side C "Mind Over Matter" – 3:30
- Side D "Playtime" – 3:10

12"'

- Side A "One and One (Ain't I Good Enough)" – 7:00
- Side B "Playtime" – 6:10

== Charts ==
Chart (1987)	Peak position
Australian Kent Music Report	19
