= Stimulation (song) =

Single by Wa Wa Nee

from the album Wa Wa Nee
- Released: 21 April 1986
- Recorded: Studios 301, Sydney
- Genre: Synth-pop
- Length: 3:46
- Label: CBS Records
- Songwriter: Paul Gray
- Producers: Paul Gray, Jim Taig

Wa Wa Nee singles chronology
"Stimulation" (1986)	"I Could Make You Love Me" (1986)

"Stimulation" is the debut single from Australian pop group Wa Wa Nee. The song was released in April 1986 as the lead single from their self-titled debut studio album. The song peaked at number 2 on the Australian singles chart.

The group performed the song live on Countdown on 20 July 1986.

At the 1986 Countdown Australian Music Awards the song was nominated for Best Debut Single.

At the ARIA Music Awards of 1987, the song was nominated for Highest Selling Single.

In 2015, the song was listed at number 25 in In the Mix's '100 Greatest Australian Dance Tracks of All Time' with Nick Jarvis said "its dad-dance-inducing extended mix, a seven-minute slap-bass odyssey that rivals Prince's finest work for generating dancefloor fire".

== Track listing ==
7" (CBS - BA3373)

- Side A "Stimulation" - 3:46
- Side B "Headlines" - 3:36

12" (CBS - BA12182)

- Side A "Stimulation" (Extended Mix)
- Side B "Stimulation" (Dub Version)
- Side B "Headlines" - 3:36

== Charts ==
=== Weekly charts ===
Chart (1986–1988)	Peak position
Australia (Kent Music Report)	2
New Zealand (Recorded Music NZ)	11
US (Billboard Hot 100)	86

=== Year-end charts ===
Chart (1986)	Peak position
Australia (Kent Music Report)	5
