= CDB (group) =

Australian R&B, dance & vocal harmony quartet

- Origin: Melbourne, Victoria, Australia
- Genres: Pop, R&B, dance
- Years active: 1991–1999; 2006–present
- Labels: Epic; Sony
- Past members: Andrew De Silva; Brad Pinto; Gary Pinto; Danny Williams; Jude Nicholas

CDB are an Australian R&B, dance and vocal harmony quartet formed in 1991 with Andrew De Silva, Brad Pinto and his brother Gary Pinto, as well as Danny Williams. CDB is an initialism which stands for Central Dandenong Boys. Their highest charting single was a cover version of Earth, Wind & Fire's "Let's Groove", which peaked at number two on the ARIA Singles Chart and number one on the New Zealand Singles Chart. "Hey Girl (This Is Our Time)" also reached number one in New Zealand. Their debut studio album, Glide with Me was released in November 1995. The group disbanded in 1999.

Musicologist Ian McFarlane said their "sound combined elements of R&B, soul and New Jack Swing tied to dexterous vocal harmonies and arrangements."

== History ==
=== Career beginnings: 1991–1999 ===
CDB were formed in Melbourne in 1991 as a vocal harmony quartet by Andrew De Silva, Brad Pinto and his brother Gary Pinto, and Danny Williams. CDB performed local gigs around Melbourne for three years including providing backing vocals for Peter Andre when he supported Madonna on her Australian The Girlie Show World Tour. CDB signed a contract with Sony in 1994. CDB's first single "Hook Me Up" was released in October 1994 and peaked at number 11 on the Australian ARIA Charts. "Hey Girl (This Is Our Time)" was released in March 1995 and peaked at number 14 in Australia followed by a cover version of Earth, Wind & Fire's "Let's Groove" which peaked at number 2 in Australia.

CDB released their debut studio album, Glide with Me in November 1995, which debuted and peaked at number six on the ARIA Albums Chart and number 12 on the New Zealand Albums Chart. "Let's Groove" and "Hey Girl (This is Our Time)" both peaked at number 1 in New Zealand in 1996. "Don't Stop", peaked the top 30 in both Australia and New Zealand. and the album was certified platinum. At the ARIA Music Awards of 1996 "Let's Groove" won the Highest Selling Single category. In New Zealand it was their second number-one hit.

CDB promoted the album across Asia and toured South Korea, Thailand, Malaysia, Singapore, Taiwan, Hong Kong, the Philippines and Fiji including a special concert with John Denver, celebrating the South Korean bid to host the 2002 FIFA World Cup.

In 1997, Jude Nicholas joined the group replacing Andrew De Silva, who needed to receive cancer treatment. "Good Times" was released in August 1997 and peaked at number 28 in Australia. CDB's second studio album, Lifted was released in November 1997. The album had a more pop-oriented sound and reached the ARIA top 50. It provided three more singles "Back Then", "Let It Whip" and "So Badd".

CDB then collaborated with Tommy Emmanuel and Renee Geyer before disbanding in 1999.

=== 2000–present ===
In 2006 CDB were asked to reunite to play some charity shows, after which they reportedly reformed. The band went on to record songs for Myer shopping centre in the 2006 Spirit of Christmas album and for the ABC's Anthems of Australia initiative. In 2008, they released a cover version of Michael Jackson's "P.Y.T. (Pretty Young Thing)". The song was due to be the lead single from their third studio album, The Funk Sessions a covers album paying tribute to their heroes. The album was however cancelled prior to release.

The Essential CDB was released in October 2010 and included "P.Y.T.". In April 2017, the band announced they would release a new album titled Tailored for Now.

"This Is How We Do It", a cover of Montell Jordan's 1995 hit was released to radio in April 2017.

In November 2020, the group will release its first Christmas album, titled Christmas Is Here: The CDB Mixtape.

In 2026 the group toured with their Nineties Child Tour.

== Solo work ==
- Gary Pinto has worked as a vocal coach on several series of Australian Idol and The X Factor and has worked extensively with Guy Sebastian, co-writing the hit "Taller, Stronger, Better" among other songs. Gary co-wrote the theme for World Youth Day 2008, "Receive the Power" with Guy and penned "Behold the Cross", which features on the WYD08 Official Soundtrack. Gary co-wrote and recorded the song "Saint Mary MacKillop" for the canonisation of Australia's first Saint, Mary MacKillop in 2010. He has toured extensively with Jimmy Barnes who recorded one of Pinto's tunes, originally written for his own album. Gary has recorded two further albums, one for his Music Ministry in schools—As-U-R Volume 1 (2010) and also his solo album Take Back Our World (2010).
- Brad Pinto was nominated as a writer for Song of the Year at the 2012 Australian ARIA Awards for the four-times platinum hit "Boys like You", performed by Australian hip hop artist 360, who also performed on the night.
- Andrew De Silva reached the top 40 with his solo single "Just Like Good Music" in 2005, but no album release eventuated. In 2012, he competed in the sixth series of Australia's Got Talent, and his audition was seen on Australian TV on 28 April 2012, where he received an enthusiastic "yes" from all three judges. He went all the way to win the grand final on 25 July 2012. De Silva supported Mariah Carey on her 2013 Australian tour and released the songs "Miracle" (2013), "I See the Future" (2015) and an EP Now That I Believe in 2015. De Silva joined Boom Crash Opera in 2016.

== Discography ==
=== Studio albums ===
List of studio albums, with selected chart positions
Title	Album details	Peak chart positions		Certifications
Title	Album details	AUS	NZL	Certifications
Glide with Me	Released: November 1995; Label: Sony Music	6	12	ARIA: Platinum
Lifted	Released: November 1997; Label: Sony Music	45	—	
Tailored for Now	Released: 28 April 2017; Label: Warner Music Australia	28	—	
Christmas Is Here: The CDB Mixtape	Released: 6 November 2020; Label: CDB, Ambition Records	—	—	

=== Compilation albums ===
Compilation album, with selected details
Title	Details
The Essential CDB	Released: 29 October 2010; Label: Sony Music

=== Singles ===
List of singles, with selected chart positions and certifications
Title	Year	Peak chart positions		Certification	Album
Title	Year	AUS	NZL	Certification	Album
"Hook Me Up"	1994	11	—	ARIA: Gold	Glide with Me
"Hey Girl (This Is Our Time)"	1995	14	1		Glide with Me
"Let's Groove"	1995	2	1	ARIA: Platinum	Glide with Me
"Don't Stop"	1996	28	25		Glide with Me
"Good Times"	1997	28	—		Lifted
"Back Then"	1997	42	—		Lifted
"Let It Whip"	1998	51	—		Lifted
"After the Love Has Gone" (Tommy Emmanuel featuring CDB)	1998	74	—		Collaboration (Tommy Emmanuel album)
"So Badd"	1999	—	—		Lifted
"I'm Gonna Make You Love Me" (with Renée Geyer)	1999	92	—		Sweet Life (Renée Geyer album)
"P.Y.T"	2008	—	—		The Essential CDB
"This Is How We Do It"	2017	—	—		Tailored for Now
"—" denotes the single did not chart.

== Awards ==
=== ARIA Music Awards ===
The ARIA Music Awards is an annual awards ceremony that recognises excellence, innovation, and achievement across all genres of Australian music.

Year	Nominee / work	Award	Result
1996	"Let's Groove"	Highest Selling Single	Won
