= Yes I Am (song) =

Single by Jack Vidgen

from the album Yes I Am
- Released: August 3, 2011
- Recorded: 2011
- Genre: Gospel, soul
- Length: 3:37
- Label: Sony Music
- Songwriters: Jack Vidgen, Erana Clark, A2

Jack Vidgen singles chronology
"Yes I Am" (2011)	"Finding You" (2011)

"Yes I Am" is the debut single by Australian recording artist Jack Vidgen, taken from his debut studio album of the same name. Vidgen co-wrote the song with former Australian Idol vocal coach Erana Clark and producer A2. It was released for digital download 3 August 2011, as Vidgen's debut single, and peaked at number thirty-five on the ARIA Singles Chart.

== Charts ==
Chart (2011)	Peak position
Australia (ARIA)	35
