= Australia's Got Talent season 5 =

Australia's Got Talent
- Season 5
- Hosted by: Grant Denyer
- Judges: Brian McFadden; Dannii Minogue; Kyle Sandilands
- Winner: Jack Vidgen
- Runner-up: Cosentino

Release
- Original network: Seven Network
- Original release: 3 May – 2 August 2011

Season chronology
- ← Previous; Season 4 Next → Season 6

Australia's Got Talent is an Australian reality television show, based on the original UK series, claiming to find new talent. The fifth season premiered on the Seven Network on 3 May 2011 and ended on 2 August 2011, where singer Jack Vidgen was crowned the winner of Australia's Got Talent, while illusionist Cosentino became runner-up. Judges Dannii Minogue, Kyle Sandilands, and Brian McFadden returned for the series, as well as host Grant Denyer.

The producer auditions took place in 16 cities across Australia, and ran from October to December 2010. The successful acts from these auditions were then invited back for a second audition in front of the judges and a live audience. These auditions were held in February and March 2011 in four major cities, including one day in Gold Coast and Perth, two days in Sydney, and three days in Melbourne. From over 200 successful auditionees, only 48 acts were selected for the semi-finals. The six semi-final shows began on 31 May 2011 and ended on 5 July. Introduced, was a new format to the show where three acts from each semi-final would advance through to the next round. In previous years only two acts have made it through each semi-final.

One of the most notable performances was by Jack Vidgen, a 14-year-old singer who sang a rendition of Whitney Houston's "I Have Nothing" for his audition. His performance earned a standing ovation from both the judges and the audiences, and has received more than 1.5 million views on YouTube. Vidgen has since been dubbed Australia's answer to Justin Bieber, and has also attracted international and local interest. The show had also sparked controversy, with accusations of contestant Jordan Paris plagiarising other comedians' jokes in his audition, and reports of contestant Chooka Parker's incident backstage following his elimination from the show.

== Auditions ==
Judges & Host for Australia's Got Talent Season 5

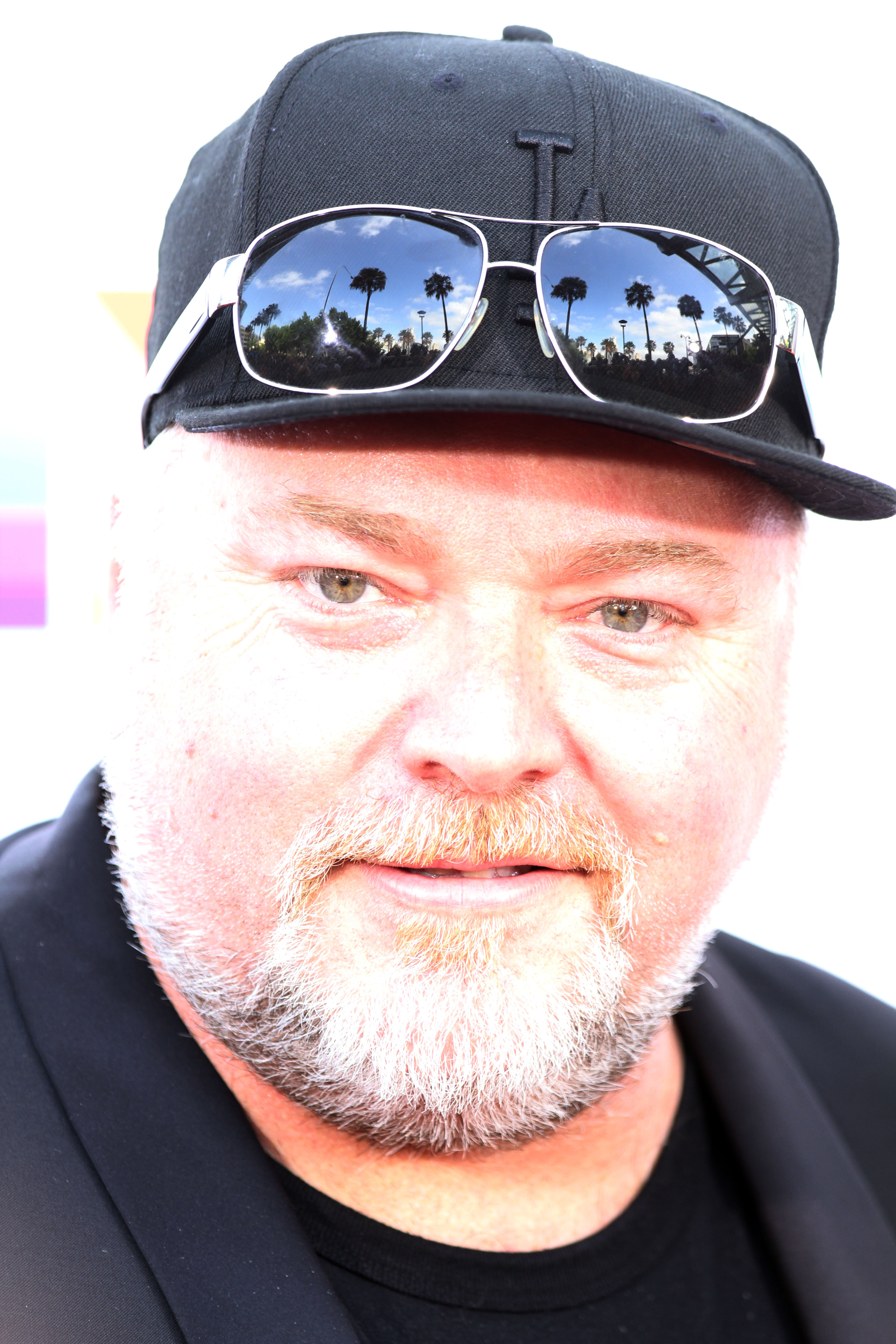
Kyle Sandilands

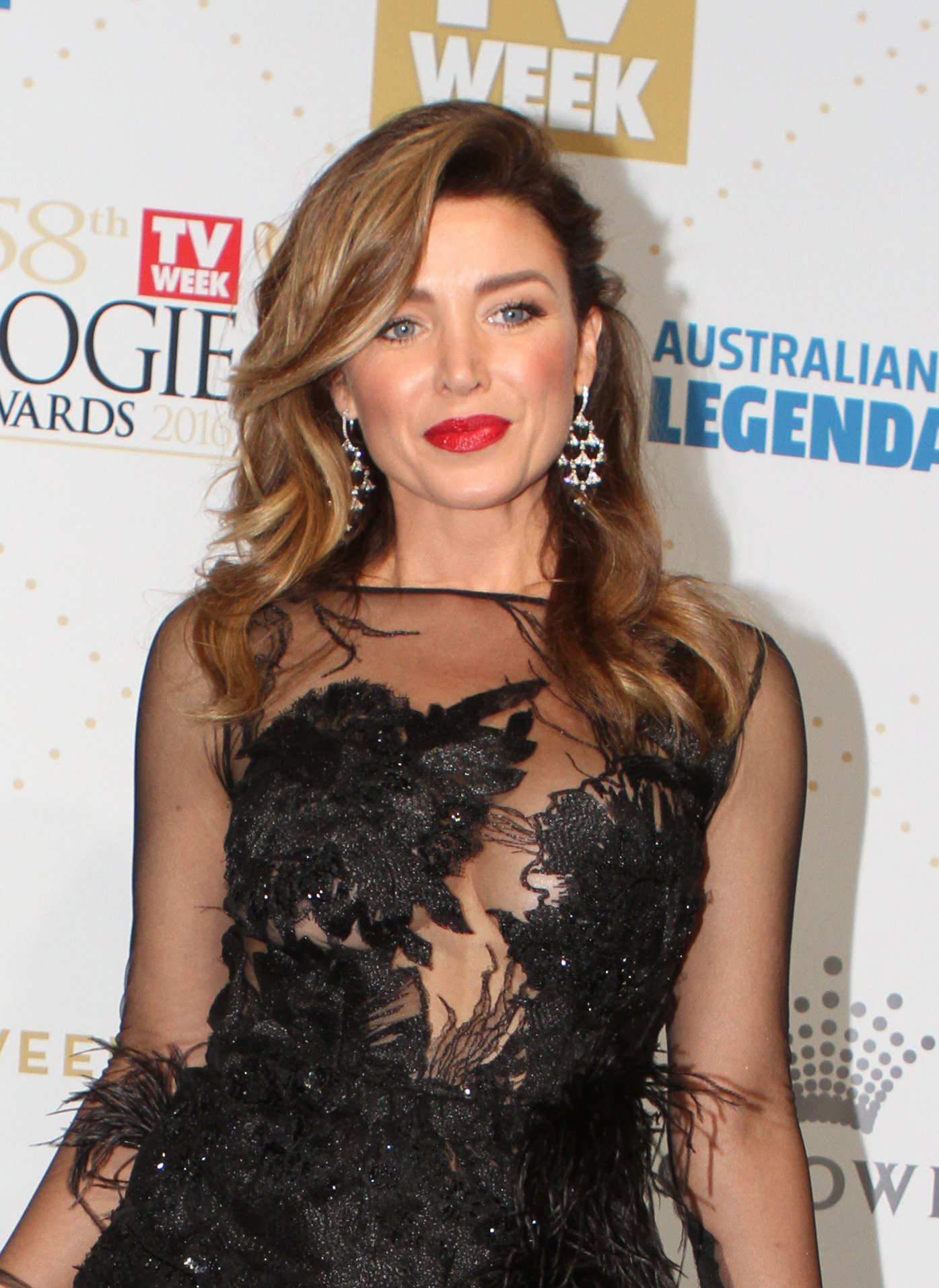
Dannii Minogue

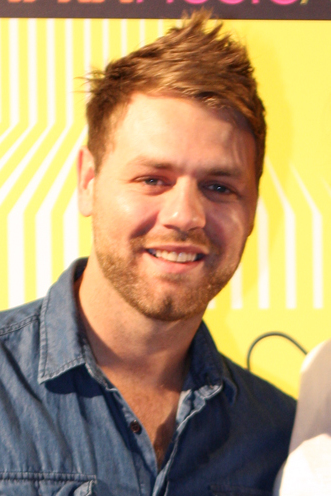
Brian McFadden

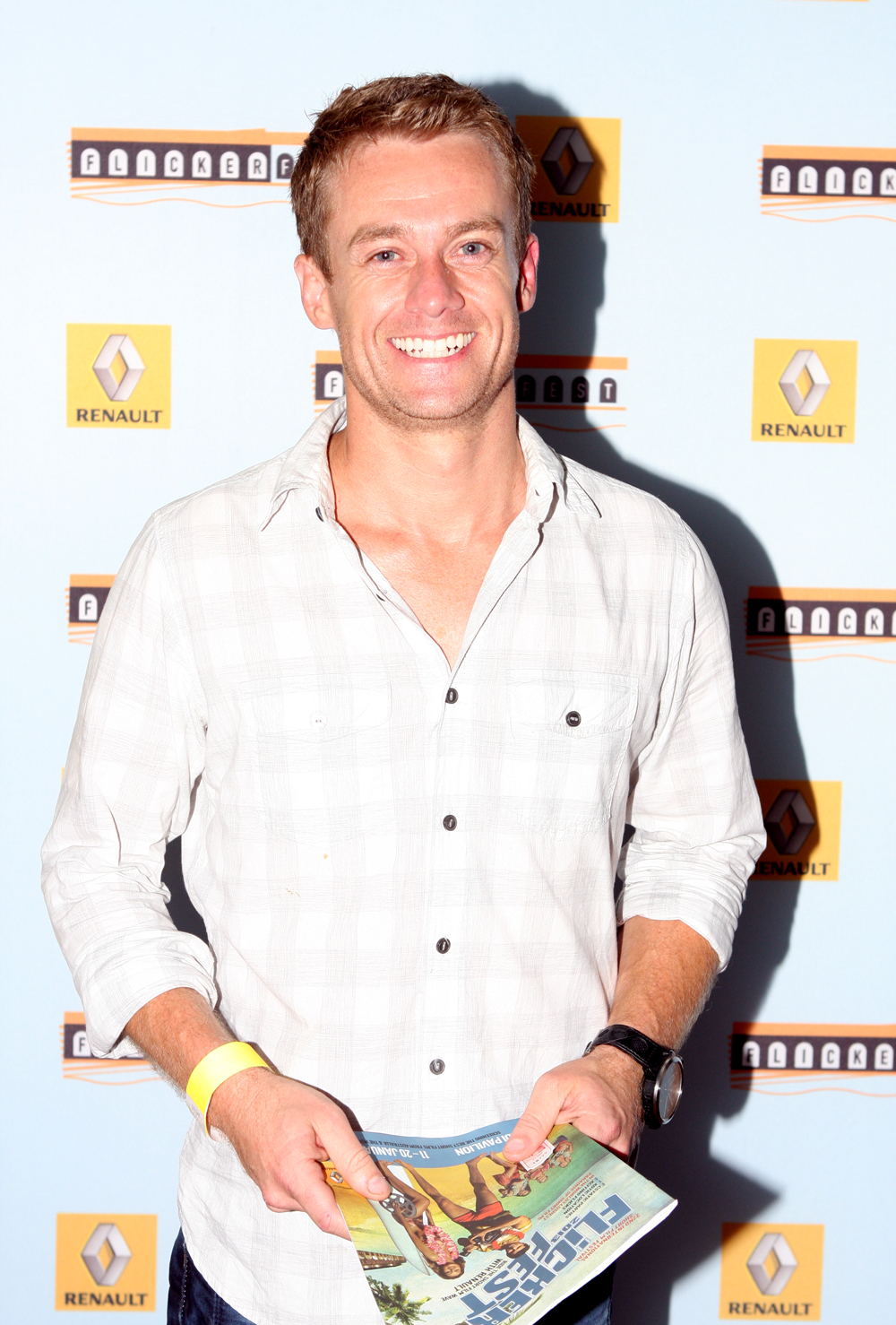
Grant Denyer

The producer auditions took place in 16 cities, throughout New South Wales, Queensland, Tasmania, Victoria, South Australia, Western Australia and the Northern Territory. These auditions began on 17 October 2010 and ended on 12 December 2010. The successful acts from the auditions were then invited to a second audition in front of the judges and a live audience. These auditions began in Gold Coast on 19 February 2011, followed by three days in Melbourne from 25 February 2011. They also took place in Sydney on 12–13 March 2011, and ended in Perth on 20 March 2011.

== Semi-finalists ==
Participant	Genre	Act	From	Semi-Final	Result
Adam Hynes	Music	Singer	Cairns	5	Finalist
Afrikan Warriors	Performing	Acrobatic Group	Launceston	5	Semi-finalist
Bree De Rome	Music	Singer	Gold Coast	1	Finalist
Belle Air	Performing	Aerial Duo	Sydney	4	Semi-finalist
Benchmark	Music	Singing Group	Gold Coast	2	Finalist
Ben Price	Comedy	Comedian	Melbourne	3	Finalist
Beau Sargent	Performing	Contortionist	Perth	5	Semi-finalist
Clara Helms	Singing	Opera Singer	Perth	5	Semi-finalist
Chooka Parker	Music	Pianist	Red Lion, Victoria	2	Finalist
Capree	Music	Singing Group	Sydney	3	Semi-finalist
Cosentino	Performing	Illusionist	Lysterfield South, Victoria	2	Runner-Up
Deep Blue	Music	Orchestra	Gold Coast	1	Semi-finalist
Dan Conway	Music	Singer	Tamworth, New South Wales	3	Finalist
Dangerboy & Ivy	Performing	Sideshow Duo	Newcastle, NSW	2	Semi-finalist
Dash & D'Bree	Comedy	Entertainers	Melbourne	1	Semi-finalist
David De Vito	Singing	Opera Singer	Gold Coast	3	Finalist
Fiona Mariah	Singing	Opera Singer	Perth	1	Semi-finalist
Hazel Phillips	Performing	Entertainer	Gold Coast	2	Semi-finalist
Instant Bun	Dancing	Dance Troupe	Various locations	4	Finalist
Jack Vidgen	Singing	Singer	Manly Vale, New South Wales	1	Winner
Jesse Emmanuel	Music	Singer	Coffs Harbour	6	Semi-finalist
Jordan Paris	Comedy	Comedian	Gold Coast	5	Semi-finalist
KLD X–treme Air Force	Dancing	Cheerleading Group	Melbourne	2	Semi-finalist
Ky Baldwin	Dancing	Tap Dancer	Sydney	6	Semi-finalist
Liam Burrows	Singing	Singer	Sydney	4	Finalist
Mac-Cussion	Music	Percussion Group	Brisbane	4	Semi-finalist
Majestic	Performing	Contortionist	Brisbane	6	Finalist
Meriden Rhythmix	Performing	Gymnastics Group	Strathfield	3	Semi-finalist
Misfits Stunt Crew	Performing	Stunt Team	Adelaide	3	Semi-finalist
Matty Shields	Gymnastics	Pole Dancer	Sydney	1	Semi-finalist
Matty "The Bandit" White	Music	Rapper	Coonabarabran, New South Wales	5	Finalist
Pete the Kabar Rockstar	Singing	Singer	Boonah, Queensland	4	Semi-finalist
Rock 'n' Roll Ropers	Dancing	Jump Rope Team	Queensland	1	Semi-finalist
Rod Collins	Music	Harmonica Player	Cairns	4	Semi-finalist
Rod "The Old Fella" Gregory	Comedy	Comedian	Maitland, New South Wales	4	Finalist
Replicators	Music	Band	Sydney	4	Semi-finalist
SKB	Dancing	Dance Group	Sydney	6	Semi-finalist
Steve Romig	Music	Singer	Tootgarook	2	Semi-finalist
Stuart Biggins	Singing	Singer	Albury, New South Wales	6	Finalist
Sisters and Misters	Music	Choir	Melbourne	5	Semi-finalist
Taiko Drum	Music	Percussion Group	Hobart, Tasmania	6	Semi-finalist
Team Rocket	Dancing	Dance Duo	Cairns	1	Finalist
The Flying Lotahs	Performing	Pole Acrobat Duo	Brisbane	6	Semi-finalist
Timomatic	Singing	Singer	Sydney	6	Finalist
Tom Ward	Music	Guitarist	Tasmania	3	Semi-finalist
Thomas Crane	Singing	Singer	Perth	3	Semi-finalist
Uprising	Music	Band	Mansfield, Victoria	2	Semi-finalist
Wayne Rogers	Performing	Drag Singer	Sydney	5	Finalist

=== Semi-final summary ===
Buzzed out | Judges' vote | Advanced - Public Vote
Advanced - Judges' Vote | Eliminated - Judges' Vote | Eliminated

==== Semi-final 1 ====
Semi-Finalist	Order	Buzzes and Judges' Vote			Result
Semi-Finalist	Order	Sandilands	Minogue	McFadden	Result
Fiona Mariah	1				Eliminated (Lost Judges' Vote)
Rock 'n' Roll Ropers	2				Eliminated
Bree De Rome	3				Advanced (Won Public Vote)
Matty Shields	4				Eliminated
Dash & D'Bree	5				Eliminated
Team Rocket	6				Advanced (Won Judges' Vote)
Deep Blue	7				Eliminated
Jack Vidgen	8				Advanced (Won Public Vote)

==== Semi-final 2 ====
Semi-Finalist	Order	Buzzes and Judges' Vote			Result
Semi-Finalist	Order	Sandilands	Minogue	McFadden	Result
KLD X–treme Air Force	1				Eliminated
Hazel Phillips	2				Eliminated
Dangerboy & Ivy	3				Eliminated
Steve Romig	4				Eliminated
Uprising	5				Eliminated (Lost Judges' Vote)
Benchmark	6				Advanced (Won Judges' Vote)
Cosentino	7				Advanced (Won Public Vote)
Chooka Parker	8				Advanced (Won Public Vote)

==== Semi-final 3 ====
Semi-Finalist	Order	Buzzes and Judges' Vote			Result
Semi-Finalist	Order	Sandilands	Minogue	McFadden	Result
Thomas Crane	1				Eliminated
Ben Price	2				Advanced (Won Judges' Vote)
Meriden Rhythmix	3				Eliminated
David De Vitto	4				Advanced (Won Public Vote)
Tom Ward	5				Eliminated
Capree	6				Eliminated (Lost Judges' Vote)
Misfits Stunt Crew	7				Eliminated
Dan Conway	8				Advanced (Won Public Vote)

==== Semi-final 4 ====
Semi-Finalist	Order	Buzzes and Judges' Vote			Result
Semi-Finalist	Order	Sandilands	Minogue	McFadden	Result
Replicators	1				Eliminated
Mac-Cussion	2				Eliminated
Rod Collins	3				Eliminated
Instant Bun	4				Advanced (Won Judges' Vote)
Pete the Kabar Rockstar	5				Eliminated
Rod "The Old Fella" Gregory	6				Advanced (Won Public Vote)
Belle Air	7				Eliminated (Lost Judges' Vote)
Liam Burrows	8				Advanced (Won Public Vote)

==== Semi-final 5 ====
Semi-Finalist	Order	Buzzes and Judges' Vote			Result
Semi-Finalist	Order	Sandilands	Minogue	McFadden	Result
Sisters and Misters	1				Eliminated
Afrikan Warriors	2				Eliminated
Clara Helms	3				Eliminated
Beau Sargent	4				Eliminated (Lost Judges' Vote)
Adam Hynes	5				Advanced (Won Public Vote)
Matty "The Bandit" White	6				Advanced (Won Judges' Vote)
Jordan Paris	7				Eliminated
Wayne Rogers	8				Advanced (Won Public Vote)

==== Semi-final 6 ====
Semi-Finalist	Order	Buzzes and Judges' Vote			Result
Semi-Finalist	Order	Sandilands	Minogue	McFadden	Result
Ky Baldwin	1		^{1}		Eliminated (Lost Judges' Vote)
Stuart Biggins	2				Advanced (Won Public Vote)
The Flying Lotahs	3	^{2}	^{2}	^{2}	Eliminated
Jesse Emmanuel	4				Eliminated
Taiko Drum	5				Eliminated
SKB	6				Eliminated
Majestic	7		^{1}		Advanced (Won Judges' Vote)
Timomatic	8				Advanced (Won Public Vote)

Notes

- ^1 Due to the majority vote for Majestic, Minogue's voting intention was not revealed.
- ^2 Due to complications, The Flying Lotahs had to perform outside the studio; the judges were required to be in person to view the performance, and used hand-carried signs in place of their buzzers, though they never used them.

== Finals summary ==
The "Order" columns lists the order of appearance each act made for every episode.

Key	Buzzed out	Judges' choice	Won the public vote	Won the judges' vote

=== Final showdown 1 ===
Order	Finalist	Act	Buzzes and Judges' votes			Result
Order	Finalist	Act	Kyle	Dannii	Brian	Result
1	Chooka Parker	Pianist				Lost judges vote
2	Bree De Rome	Singer/Guitarist				Eliminated
3	Ben Price	Comedian				Won public vote
4	David De Vito	Opera Singer				Won public vote
5	Instant Bun	Dance Troupe				Won judges vote
6	Dan Conway	Singer/Guitarist				Eliminated
7	Majestic	Contortionist				Eliminated
8	Jack Vidgen	Singer				Won public vote
9	Cosentino	Illusionist				Won public vote

Notes

- ^{1} David De Vitto, Cosentino, and Jack Vidgen were the three acts who won the public vote.
- ^{2} The judges then had to choose a fourth act to go through to the grand-final.

Judges' votes (revealed in order)

- McFadden: Ben Price
- Minogue: Chooka Parker
- Sandilands: Instant Bun

As their votes were a tie, the result went to the public vote. It was then revealed that the act who received the most votes was Ben Price.

=== Final showdown 2 ===
Order	Finalist	Act	Buzzes and Judges' votes			Result
Order	Finalist	Act	Kyle	Dannii	Brian	Result
1	Stuart Biggins	Singer				Eliminated
2	Team Rocket	Dance Duo				Lost judges vote
3	Liam Burrows	Singer				Won public vote
4	Benchmark	Singing Group				Won judges vote
5	Adam Hynes	Singer/Guitarist				Eliminated
6	Matty "The Bandit" White	Rapper				Won judges vote
7	Wayne Rogers	Drag Singer				Eliminated
8	Rod "The Old Fella" Gregory	Comedian				Won public vote
9	Timomatic	Singer/Dancer				Won public vote

Judges' first vote (revealed in order)

- McFadden: Matty "The Bandit" White
- Minogue: Benchmark
- Sandilands: Matty "The Bandit" White

As McFadden and Sandilands both voted for Matty "The Bandit" White, he won the first judges vote.

Judges' second vote (revealed in order)

- Sandilands: Benchmark
- Minogue: Benchmark

As Sandilands and Minogue both voted for Benchmark, they won the second judges vote. It is unsure who McFadden would have voted for.

=== Final ===
Key	Winner	Runner-up

Order	Contestant	Act	Finished
1	Liam Burrows	Singer	5th place
2	Instant Bun	Dance Troupe	10th place
3	Ben Price	Comedian	8th place
4	David De Vitto	Opera Singer	9th place
5	Matty "The Bandit" White	Rapper	6th place
6	Rod "The Old Fella" Gregory	Comedian	4th place
7	Timomatic	Singer/Dancer	3rd Place
8	Benchmark	Singing Group	7th place
9	Jack Vidgen	Singer	Winner
10	Cosentino	Illusionist	Runner-Up

Notes

- Vidgen was awarded the grand prize of $250,000.
- Guest performers on the grand final decider show were Justice Crew and Jessica Mauboy.

== Reception ==
=== Controversies ===
Comedian Jordan Paris, who made it through to the semi-finals, was accused of plagiarising his jokes in his audition, of which he performed a routine about English singer Robbie Williams. On 26 May 2011, The Gold Coast Bulletin reported that the same routine was performed by English comedian Lee Mack in 2007 on the British stand-up comedy show Live at the Apollo. Paris said he was aware of Mack's work but did not rip off his routine, stating "comedy's a funny thing. Obviously there are a lot of people doing a lot of things, but a joke's a joke. If it's making people laugh then I'm happy." That same day, Brisbane Times also reported that the other half of Paris' routine – about his three requirements for dating a woman – had been lifted from a routine by US comedian Geoff Keith.

After losing the judges' votes in the first final showdown, host Grant Denyer tweeted that Chooka Parker reportedly took the news of his elimination very badly. Parker was reportedly banging windows and doors after losing the grand final spot to dance troupe Instant Bun. He was then warned by studio security before driving off with his parents before the show ended. A spokeswoman for the Seven Network told The Daily Telegraph, "Chooka's family have acquired a TV since he became part of the show and he has understood how the show and fame works since he started... He was upset when Brian said his routine had not developed enough and later went upstairs to the edit suite and blamed them for ruining his performance and he became a bit physical, slamming his hand into a window."

Many of the above cited newspaper stories were grossly exaggerated with Chooka admitting later that although he had been upset it did not happen as the tabloids had argued. Instead Chooka was upset because "The producers took out a crucial part of my song. They pretty much destroyed my piece. I went backstage to ask them why they did it but they wouldn’t listen to me. I just hit the window, I definitely didn’t wrap my hand in a jumper and smash it. I’m not two-faced, what I said on stage I meant. All I want from my music is to make people happy", Chooka said. "You’ve got to hear my music from start to end. By changing it they made it sound as if I had made a mistake. Not winning the show wasn’t too disappointing, winning was never a dream. I just wish they hadn’t cut my song." explains Chooka. 17 year old Bree De Rome continued in her success from AGT 2011 and was managed by Adam Wilkinson (5 Seconds Of Summer)recording her first EP at Studio 31 and distributed By MGM, De Rome made an appearance on various programs including Love Child.

=== Contestants ===
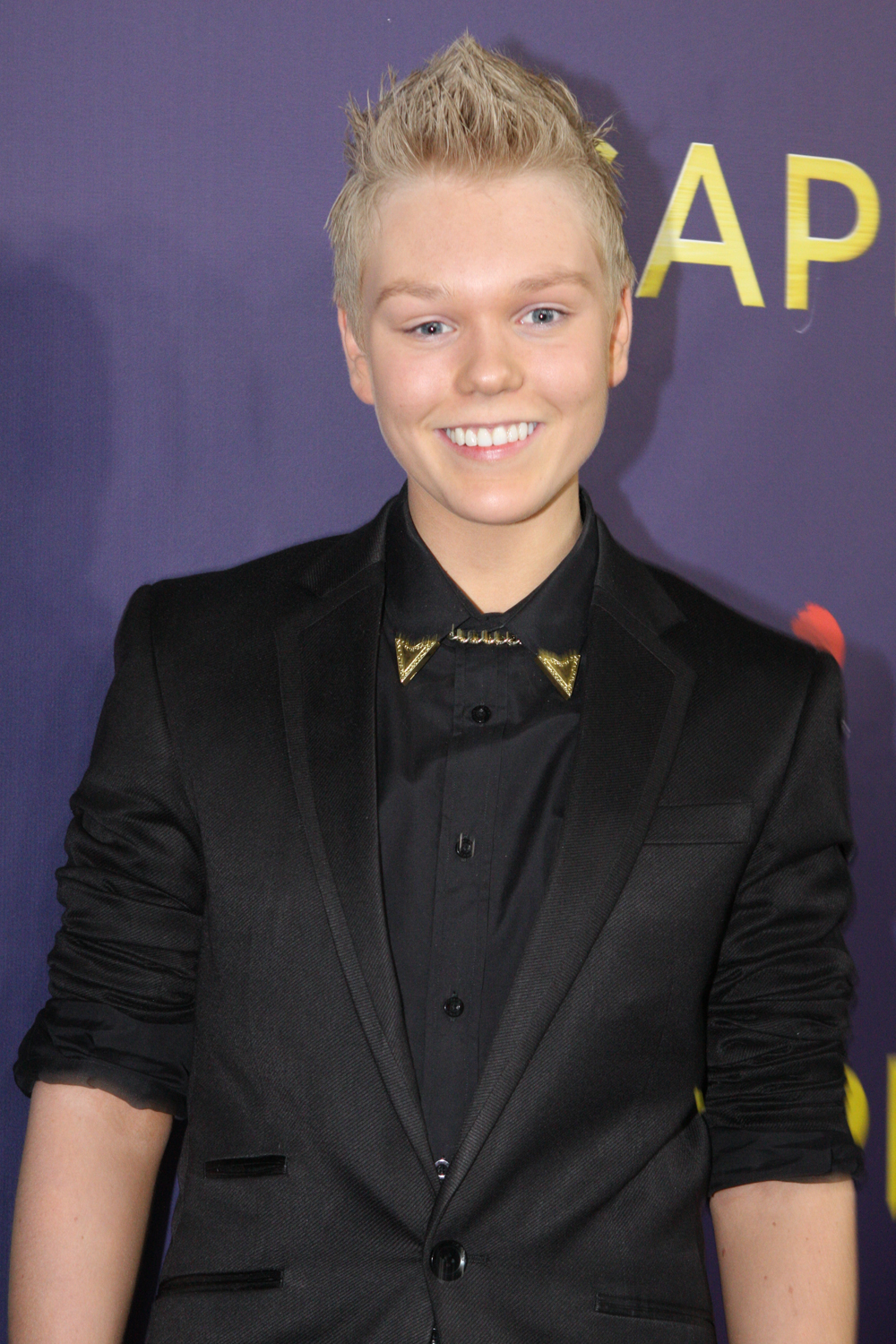
14-year-old Jack Vidgen eventually ended up winning the show.

Singer Jack Vidgen, a 14-year-old, appeared on the first episode on 3 May 2011, and performed a rendition of Whitney Houston's "I Have Nothing" for his audition. The performance earned a standing ovation from both the judges and the audiences. Judge Kyle Sandilands said, "You're either gonna be amazing or dreadful – both I will enjoy", while judge Brian McFadden was so moved from the performance he ran up on stage to kiss Vidgen's cheek. The performance has been viewed more than 3.5 million times on YouTube. Vidgen has since been dubbed Australia's answer to Justin Bieber and has received international and local interest. The celebrity gossip blogger Perez Hilton has posted several blogs of Vidgen's performances on his website. In late July 2011, it was reported that Vidgen had signed a record deal with Sony Music Australia.

While the artist Chooka Parker did not sign a contract with a record label he has gone on to become a successful pianist, performing around Australia and overseas. Chooka Parker won a major music award in the People's Choice category, which enabled him to perform at the Sydney Opera House. He has released two recordings to date, a CD titled "No Worries!" in October 2011, and an EP titled, "My Jewel" in 2012

=== Ratings ===
The first episode on 3 May 2011, achieved an audience of 1,563,000 and placed second overall for the night, being beaten by Masterchef Australia. The second episode saw a slight drop in ratings with 1,457,000 viewers, and placed second once again. The next five episodes each topped the nights overall ratings. The seventh episode reached an audience of 1,815,000, which made Australia's Got Talent the third highest rating program of 2011. The first live semi-final show on 31 May 2011, gained 1,949,000 viewers and topped the nights overall ratings. The ratings boost was credited to 14-year-old singer Jack Vidgen who performed a cover of "And I Am Telling You I'm Not Going" from the Dreamgirls soundtrack. The grand final show on 26 July 2011, achieved an audience of 2,192,000, becoming the season's highest ratings to date. The grand final decider show on 2 August 2011, gained 2,855,000 viewers and topped the nights overall ratings. The ratings were the highest achieved in 2011 so far by a television show broadcast in Australia.

Episode		Airdate	Timeslot	Viewers (millions)	Night Rank	Ref
1	"Auditions"	3 May 2011	Tuesday 7:30 pm–9:00 pm	1.563	2	
2	"Auditions"	4 May 2011	Wednesday 7:30 pm–8:30 pm	1.457	2	
3	"Auditions"	10 May 2011	Tuesday 7:30 pm–9:00 pm	1.752	1	
4	"Auditions"	11 May 2011	Wednesday 7:30 pm–8:30 pm	1.514	1	
5	"Auditions"	17 May 2011	Tuesday 7:30 pm–9:00 pm	1.783	1	
6	"Auditions"	18 May 2011	Wednesday 7:30 pm–8:30 pm	1.519	1	
7	"Auditions"	24 May 2011	Tuesday 7:30 pm–9:00 pm	1.815	1	
8	"Auditions"	25 May 2011	Wednesday 7:30 pm–8:30 pm	1.286	4	
9	"Semi-Finals"	31 May 2011	Tuesday 7:30 pm–9:00 pm	1.949	1	
10	"Semi-Finals"	7 June 2011	Tuesday 7:30 pm–9:00 pm	1.927	1	
11	"Semi-Finals"	14 June 2011	Tuesday 7:30 pm–9:00 pm	1.847	1	
12	"Semi-Finals"	21 June 2011	Tuesday 7:30 pm–9:00 pm	1.756	1	
13	"Semi-Finals"	28 June 2011	Tuesday 7:30 pm–9:00 pm	1.638	2	
14	"Semi-Finals"	5 July 2011	Tuesday 7:30 pm–9:00 pm	1.373	4	
15	"Final Showdowns"	12 July 2011	Tuesday 7:30 pm–9:00 pm	1.807	1	
16	"Final Showdowns"	19 July 2011	Tuesday 7:30 pm–9:00 pm	1.859	1	
17	"Grand Final Show"	26 July 2011	Tuesday 7:30 pm–9:30 pm	2.192	1	
18	"Grand Finale" "Grand Final Decider Show"	2 August 2011	Tuesday 7:30 pm–9:30 pm	2.316 2.855	2 1	
