= Gary Pinto =

Australian singer, songwriter and musician

- Born: Melbourne, Victoria, Australia
- Genres: Pop, R&B
- Occupations: Singer, songwriter, musician
- Years active: 1990–present
- Member of: CDB
- Website: garypinto.com

Gary Pinto is an Australian singer, songwriter and musician and was the lead singer of dance group, CDB.

== Early life ==
Gary Pinto is an Australian musician of Anglo-Indian descent. His parents were from Chennai and members of a minority Christian Indian Catholics. The family emigrated to Australia in 1973 where Gary was born.

== Career ==
=== 1991–1999 and 2006–present: CDB ===
CBD were formed by Gary Pinto alongside his brother Brad Pinto, Andrew De Silva and Danny Williams. The group released their debut studio album, Glide with Me in 1995 and won the ARIA Award for Highest Selling Single in 1996. The band split up in 1999.

=== 1999–present: Solo ===
Pinto moved on to perform as a solo artist and has since worked working with artists such as Guy Sebastian, Anthony Callea, Christine Anu, Jimmy Barnes, Jade MacRae and Taylor Dayne.

Pinto co-wrote "Receive the Power" with Guy Sebastian, a song for the World Youth Day 2008 in Sydney. It was performed live during the event by Guy Sebastian and Paulini Curuenavuli. The song was released in two versions, one in English (by Guy Sebastian and Paulini) and an international version verses in Italian (performed by Robert Galea), Spanish (by German Silva) and French (by Amelia Farrugia) and chorus in English. Gary Pinto performed "Receive the Power" and "Behold The Cross" during the same event.

In August 2010, he released his debut solo album Take Back Our World with contributions from Diesel, Dave Darling, Brad Pinto and Meredith Brooks. The album also contains the bonus track "Saint Mary MacKillop", a song he co-wrote as the 2010 official song for the canonisation of Mary MacKillop.

For World Youth Day 2011 in Madrid, Pinto released a joint EP, Firm in the Faith, with John Burland.

=== As-U-R Music Ministry ===
Gary Pinto co founded As-U-R Music Ministry with his brother Brad Pinto and manager Tracey Duff a music ministry for youth. It runs workshops in Catholic Primary Schools and concert/testimonial workshops in Catholic Secondary Schools. It also works with Catholic Youth Services (CYS), youth groups, the Catholic Education Office and various parishes to bring Catholic religious music and families back to church.

== Discography ==
=== Albums ===
List of albums
Title	Details
Divine Mercy Chaplet (with Robert Galea and Natasha Pinto)	Released: 14 May 2010; Format: Digital download, streaming; Label: Robert Galea, Gary Pinto, Natasha Pinto
Glorify: A Contemporary Mass Setting for Young People (with Robert Galea and Natasha Pinto)	Released: 20 June 2012; Format: Digital download, streaming; Label: Robert Galea, Gary Pinto, Natasha Pinto
Sam Cooke: The Music	Released: 22 April 2022; Format: Digital download, streaming; Label: Sony Music Australia

=== Singles ===
List of singles, with selected chart positions
Title	Year	Peak chart positions	Album
Title	Year	AUS	Album
"What the Day Brings"	2001	81	Non-album single
"Higher" (with Jimmy Barnes)	2002	80	Double Happiness
