= Andrew De Silva =

Australian R&B and rock singer

- Born: Andrew Conrad De Silva; 23 November 1974 (age 51); Melbourne, Victoria, Australia
- Genres: R&B, rock
- Instruments: Guitar, bass, keyboards
- Years active: 1991–present
- Formerly of: CDB
- Website: andrewdesilva.com.au

Andrew Conrad De Silva (born 23 November 1974) is an Australian singer. He was a member of the band CDB from 1993 to 1998, when he left to undergo treatment for cancer. De Silva won Australia's Got Talent in 2012, which included a cash prize of $250,000.

== Early life ==
De Silva was born in Melbourne into a family originally from Sri Lanka.

== Career ==
=== 1991–1999: CDB ===
Andrew De Silva formed CDB with Brad Pinto and Gary Pinto. Between 1991 and 1999, the group released two studio albums and won an ARIA Music Award. They disbanded in 1999.

=== 2004–present: Solo career and Boom Crash Opera ===
In 2005, De Silva released his debut solo single, "Just Like Good Music", which peaked at number 33 on the ARIA Charts.

In 2012, De Silva auditioned for and won season 6 of Australia's Got Talent.

In 2013, Andrew De Silva was the support act for Mariah Carey at Etihad Stadium & Allphones Arena.

In 2014, Andrew was presented with the Award for Media & Entertainment by the Sri Lankan Association of Australia. Also in 2014 at the Serendib awards, De Silva was presented with the Lifetime Achievement Award.

De Silva was a judge for the Miss Sri Lanka Online contest in 2012.

In September 2014, he released the EP Now That I Believe.

In 2016, Andrew De Silva was announced as the new lead singer of Australian group Boom Crash Opera.

In November 2016, De Silva gathered several Australian musicians to create a "Purple Revolution: A Tribute To Prince" tour.

== Discography ==
=== Albums ===
List of albums, with selected details
Title	Details
The Lost Demos	Released: April 2020; Format: Digital; Label: Believe Entertainment
Lighthill Sessions	Released: 30 August 2024; Format: Digital; Label: Believe Entertainment

=== Extended plays ===
List of EPs, with selected details
Title	Details
Now That I Believe	Released: September 2014; Format: Digital; Label: Believe Entertainment

=== Charting singles ===
List of singles, with selected chart positions
Title	Year	Peak chart positions
Title	Year	AUS
"Just Like Good Music"	2005	33

Preceded by Jack Vidgen	Winner of Australia's Got Talent; 2012	Succeeded by Uncle Jed
