= Paul Gray (songwriter) =

Australian keyboardist and songwriter

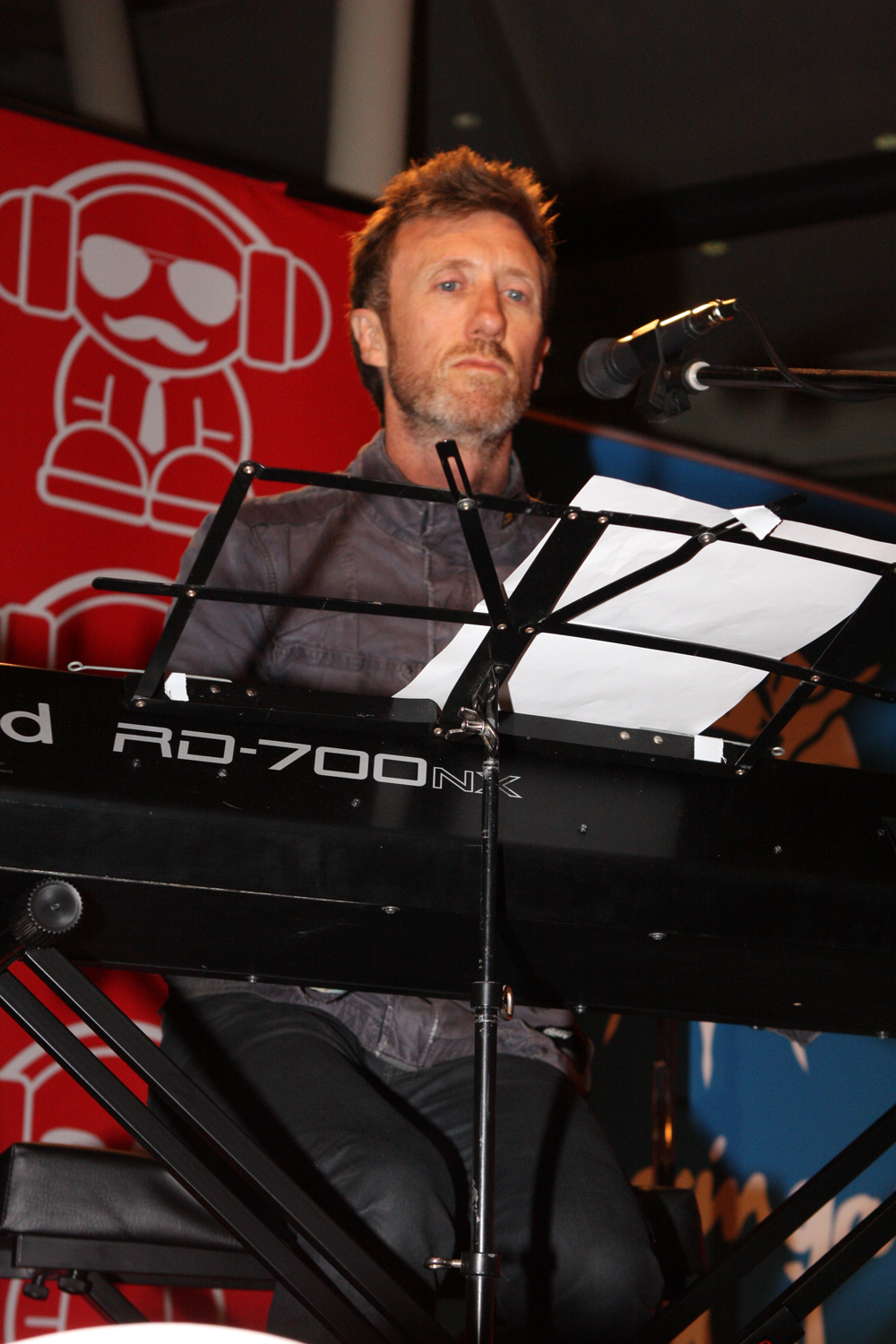
- Gray at Warringah Mall, Sydney, Australia, in July 2012

Background information
- Born: Paul Francis Gray; 28 November 1963; Melbourne, Victoria, Australia
- Died: 24 April 2018 (aged 54)
- Genres: Rock, pop
- Occupations: Musician, songwriter, singer
- Instruments: Keyboard, keytar, vocals
- Years active: 1980−2014
- Formerly of: Wa Wa Nee

Paul Francis Gray (28 November 1963 – 24 April 2018) was an Australian singer, songwriter, pianist, and record producer. He met with early success as the lead vocalist for the 1980s funk/pop band Wa Wa Nee.

After the disbanding of Wa Wa Nee, Gray concentrated on work as a keyboard player, musical director, songwriter and producer. He worked with many highly successful Australian artists, including Tina Arena, Kate Ceberano and Bardot.

Gray appeared in the Countdown Spectacular 2 concert series in Australia between late August and early September 2007 as a performer and musical director. He sang two songs: "Stimulation" and "Sugar Free". In 2012, Gray appeared on an episode of Myf Warhurst's Nice, singing a duet of "Islands in the Stream" with Warhurst.

== Death ==
Gray was diagnosed with multiple myeloma in 2014, and died from the disease on 24 April 2018, at age 54. The news was announced by his brother and fellow band member, Mark.

== Selective discography ==
- 1986 Wa Wa Nee, Wa Wa Nee – Paul Gray: vocals, keyboards, songwriting
- 1989 Wa Wa Nee, Blush – Paul Gray: vocals, keyboards, songwriting
- 1994 Kate Ceberano, Kate Ceberano and Friends – Paul Gray: keyboards, producer
- 2000 Bardot, Bardot – Paul Gray: programmer, producer
- 2001 Scandal'us, Startin' Somethin' – Paul Gray: producer
- 2003 Tina Arena, Vous Êtes Toujours Là – Paul Gray: musical director, keyboards
- 2004 Trentwood, Autotunes – Paul Gray: keyboards, backing vocals
- 2005 Anthony Callea, "Per Sempre"
- 2005 Tina Arena, Greatest Hits Live – Paul Gray: musical director, keyboards

He also appeared in three compilations and one video.
