= List of animated feature films of 2024 =

The following is a list of animated feature films that were released in 2024.

== List ==
Title	Country	Director	Production company	Animation technique	Notes	Release date	Duration
3 Little Kungpoo Goats	China; Islamic Republic of Iran	Farzad Dalvand; Kianoush Dalvand	Aria Animation Studio; Phoenix Motion Picture Production	CG animation		September 10, 2022 (World Festival of Animated Film); April 13, 2023 (Russia); May 24, 2024 (Turkey)	89 minutes
10 Lives	United Kingdom; Canada	Chris Jenkins	GFM Animation; Align; Quad; The Happy Producers	CG animation		January 20, 2024 (Sundance); April 5, 2024 (United Kingdom)	88 minutes
200% Wolf	Australia	Alexs Stadermann	Flying Bark Productions	CG animation		July 4, 2024 (New Zealand); August 8, 2024 (Australia)	98 minutes
Animal Tales of Christmas Magic	France; Germany	Camille Alméras; Ceylan Beyoglu; Natalia Chernysheva; Haruna Kishi; Caroline Attia Larivière; Olesya Shchukina	Les Valseurs; Arte France Cinéma; Luftkind Filmverleih; Gao Shan Pictures; Riverman; Studio Pulp; Amopix; Fabian & Fred; Ciné+ OCS; Centre national du cinéma et de l'image animée (CNC); La Région Île-de-France; Région Réunion; Région Grand Est; MOIN Filmförderung Hamburg Schleswig-Holstein; Filmförderungsanstalt (FFA); Société des Producteurs de Cinéma et de Télévision (Procirep); Arte France; Indéfilms 11	Flash animation		June 11, 2024 (Annecy); November 21, 2024 (Germany); November 27, 2024 (France)	72 minutes
Anpanman: Baikinman and Lulun in the Picture Book	Japan	Jun Kawagoe	Anpanman Production Committee; TMS Entertainment	Traditional		June 28, 2024	64 minutes
Arf	Italy	Simona Cornacchia; Anna Russo	Genoma Films	Flash animation		January 25, 2024	75 minutes
BanG Dream! Spring Sunshine, Lost Cat	Japan	Kōdai Kakimoto	Sanzigen	Traditional		September 27, 2024	
BanG Dream! Sing, Songs That Become Us & Film Live	Japan	Kōdai Kakimoto	Sanzigen	Traditional		November 8, 2024	
Star Blazers: Space Battleship Yamato 3199	Japan	Harutoshi Fukui; Naomichi Yamato	Studio Mother	Traditional		July 19, 2024	50 minutes
Berry and Dolly - Bells; Bogyó és Babóca 6 - Csengettyűk	Hungary	Géza M. Tóth; Kinga Fazakas	Kedd Animation Studio	Flash animation		March 28, 2024 (Hungary)	70 minutes
Big City Greens the Movie: Spacecation	United States	Anne O'Brian	Disney Television Animation	Traditional		June 6, 2024	82 minutes
Big Man	Czech Republic	Radek Beran	Bedna Films; Czech Television	Stop-Motion; Puppetry		May 2, 2024 (Cinema on the Border); October 3, 2024	72 minutes
Bizarros Peixes das Fossas Abissais	Brazil	Marcelo Fabri Marão	Boulevard Filmes; Marão Filmes	Traditional		January 25, 2024	75 minutes
Bloody Escape: Jigoku no Tōsō Geki	Japan	Gorō Taniguchi	Polygon Pictures	CG animation Traditional		January 5, 2024	87 minutes
Blue Lock: Episode Nagi	Japan	Shunsuke Ishikawa	Eight Bit	Traditional		April 19, 2024	91 minutes
Boonie Bears: Time Twist	China	Lin Huida	Fantawild Animation	CG animation		February 10, 2024	105 minutes
Bouchra; For Aicha	Italy; Morocco; United States	Meriem Bennani; Orian Barki	Fondazione Prada; 2 Lizards Production; Hi Production; SB Films	CG animation		October 31, 2024 (Milan); September 5, 2025 (Toronto); September 27, 2025 (New York); October 10, 2025 (Bordeaux) October 19, 2025 (Rome); 2026 (United States)	73 minutes (original cut); 83 minutes (festival run)
Boys Go to Jupiter	United States	Julian Glander	Glanderco	CG animation		June 7, 2024 (Tribeca); August 8, 2025 (United States)	90 minutes
Buffalo Kids	Spain	Pedro Solís García; Juan Jesús García Galocha	4Cats Pictures; Atresmedia Cine; Anangu Grup; Little Big Boy AIE; Mogambo Productions	CG animation		June 14, 2024 (Annecy); August 14, 2024 (Spain)	93 minutes
Butterfly Tale	Canada; Germany	Sophie Roy	CarpeDiem Film & TV; Ulysses Filmproduktion; Senator Film Köln	CG animation		September 16, 2023 (Atlantic International Film Festival); September 29, 2023 (Spain); October 13, 2023 (Canada); February 1, 2024 (Germany)	82 minutes
Captain Avispa	Dominican Republic	Jean Gabriel Guerra; Jonnathan Melendez	Guerra Films; Guerra Toons	CG animation		April 4, 2024 (Dominican Republic)	88 minutes
The Casagrandes Movie	United States	Miguel Puga	Netflix; Nickelodeon Movies	Traditional; Flash animation		March 22, 2024	85 minutes
Code Geass: Rozé of the Recapture	Japan	Yoshimitsu Ohashi	Sunrise	Traditional	Four-part film series	May 10, 2024 (Act 1); June 7, 2024 (Act 2); July 5, 2024 (Act 3); August 2, 2024 (Final Act)	74 minutes (Act 1); 76 minutes (Act 2); 76 minutes (Act 3); 74 minutes (Final Act)
The Colors Within	Japan	Naoko Yamada	Science Saru	Traditional		June 10, 2024 (Annecy); August 30, 2024 (Japan)	100 minutes
Combat Wombat: Back 2 Back	Australia	Ricard Cussó; Tania Vincent	Like a Photon Creative	CG animation		October 28, 2023 (Brisbane International Film Festival); February 29, 2024 (Australia)	81 minutes
Crayon Shin-chan the Movie: Our Dinosaur Diary	Japan	Shinobu Sasaki	Shin-Ei Animation	Traditional		August 9, 2024	106 minutes
Dalia and the Red Book	Argentina; Colombia; Brazil; Ecuador; Peru; Spain	David Bisbano	Vista Sur Films; Mi Perro Producciones; FilmSharks International; Golem Studio; Doce Entertainment; Cinefilm; Matte CG; Signos Studio; Mr Miyagi Films	CG animation		October 3, 2024 (Sitges Film Festival); October 17, 2024 (Argentina)	107 minutes
Dan Da Dan: First Encounter	Japan	Fūga Yamashiro	Science Saru	Traditional		August 31, 2024	75 minutes
The Day the Earth Blew Up: A Looney Tunes Movie	United States	Pete Browngardt	Warner Bros. Animation	Traditional		June 11, 2024 (Annecy); March 14, 2025 (United States)	91 minutes
Dead Dead Demon's Dededede Destruction	Japan	Tomoyuki Kurokawa	Production +h.	Traditional		March 22, 2024; May 24, 2024	120 minutes (each)
Demon Slayer: Kimetsu no Yaiba – To the Hashira Training	Japan	Haruo Sotozaki	Ufotable	Traditional		February 2, 2024 (Japan); February 23, 2024 (United States)	103 minutes
Despicable Me 4	United States	Chris Renaud	Universal Pictures; Illumination	CG animation		June 9, 2024 (Jazz at Lincoln Center); July 3, 2024 (United States)	95 minutes
Detective Conan: The Million Dollar Pentagram	Japan	Chika Nagaoka	TMS Entertainment	Traditional		April 12, 2024	110 minutes
Dikkie Dik en de verdwenen knuffel	Netherlands	Joost van den Boshe; Erik Verkerk	Ka-Ching Cartoons	Traditional		June 19, 2024	62 minutes
Diplodocus	Czech Republic; Poland; Slovakia	Wojtek Wawszczyk	Human Film; Telewizja Polska (TVP) - Agencja Filmowa; PFX; Dayhey	CG animation Live-action		June 9, 2024 (Annecy); September 23, 2022 (Gdynia Film Festival); October 4, 2024 (Poland)	90 minutes
Dongeng Sang Kancil	Malaysia	Ahmad Razuri Roseli	Les' Copaque Production; Astro Shaw	CG animation		December 26, 2024	99 minutes
Doraemon: Nobita's Earth Symphony	Japan	Kazuaki Imai	Shin-Ei Animation	Traditional		March 1, 2024	115 minutes
Double Tuckerr	India	Meera Mahadhi	Air Flick; PVR Inox Pictures	CG animation Live-action		April 5, 2024	120 minutes
Dragonkeeper	Spain; China	Salvador Simó; Li Jianping	Guardián de Dragones AIE; China Film Animation	CG animation		March 1, 2024 (Málaga); April 19, 2024 (Spain)	98 minutes
Elli and the Ghostly Ghost Train (also known as Elli and Her Monster Team)	Germany; Canada	Piet De Rycker; Jesper Møller; Jens Møller	Carpe Diem Film & TV; Dreamin' Dolphin Film; Eagle Eye Filmproduktion; Traumhaus Studios; Zooper Film	CG animation		June 27, 2024	86 minutes
Exorcism Chronicles: The Beginning	South Korea	Kim Dong-Chul	Locus	CG animation		June 13, 2024 (Annecy); February 21, 2025 (South Korea)	85 minutes
A Few Moments of Cheers	Japan	Popreq	Hurray! 100studio	Traditional		June 14, 2024	68 minutes
Flow	Belgium; Latvia; France	Gints Zilbalodis	Dream Well Studio; Sacrebleu Productions; Take Five	CG animation		May 22, 2024 (Cannes); October 30, 2024 (France)	85 minutes
The Formula for Water	Russia	Artyom Minakov	Magic Factory Animation; Soyuzmultfilm	CG animation		October 3, 2024	86 minutes
Fox and Hare Save the Forest	Netherlands; Belgium	Mascha Halberstad	Submarine; Walking the Dog; Doghouse	CG animation		February 18, 2024 (Berlinale)	71 minutes
From Ground Zero	Palestine; France; Qatar; Jordan	Aws Al-Banna; Ahmed Al-Danf; Basil Al-Maqousi; Mustafa Al-Nabih; Muhammad Alshareef; Ala Ayob; Bashar Al Balbisi; Alaa Damo; Awad Hana; Ahmad Hassunah; Mustafa Kallab; Satoum Kareem; Mahdi Karera; Rabab Khamees; Khamees Masharawi; Wissam Moussa; Tamer Najm; Abu Hasna Nidaa; Damo Nidal; Mahmoud Reema; Etimad Weshah; Islam Al Zrieai	Masharawi Fund For Films & Filmmakers in Gaza; Coorigines Production; Metafora Production; Sharjah Art Foundation; International Media Support; Akka Films; The Royal Film Commission; Doha Film Institute	Cutout; Live-action		July 5, 2024 (Amman)	112 minutes
Fureru	Japan	Tatsuyuki Nagai	CloverWorks	Traditional		October 4, 2024	107 minutes
Fuuto PI: Portrait of Kamen Rider Skull	Japan	Yousuke Kabashima	Studio Kai	Traditional		November 8, 2024	82 minutes
Ganbatte Ikimasshoi	Japan	Yūhei Sakuragi	Studio Moe; Reirs	Traditional		October 25, 2024	95 minutes
The Garfield Movie	United States	Mark Dindal	Columbia Pictures; Alcon Entertainment; DNEG Animation	CG animation		May 19, 2024 (Grauman's Chinese Theatre); May 24, 2024 (United States)	101 minutes
Gekijōban SutoPuri Hajimari no Monogatari: Strawberry School Festival!!!!	Japan	Naoki Matsuura	Liden Films	Traditional		July 19, 2024	83 minutes
Ghost Cat Anzu	Japan; France	Yŏko Kuno; Nobuhiro Yamashita	Shin-Ei Animation; Miyu Productions	Traditional		May 21, 2024 (Cannes); July 19, 2024 (Japan)	97 minutes
Giants of La Mancha	Argentina; Germany	Gonzalo Gutierrez 'G.G.'	3 Doubles Producciones; GF Films; GGVFX; M.A.R.K.13™ Studio 100; Studio Isar Animation	CG animation		March 28, 2024 (Portugal)	89 minutes
Given	Japan	Noriko Hashimoto	Lerche	Traditional		January 27, 2024 (Hiiragi mix); September 20, 2024 (To the Sea)	70 minutes (Hiiragi Mix); 80 minutes (To the Sea)
The Glassworker	Pakistan	Usman Riaz	Mano Animation Studios	Traditional		June 9, 2024 (Annecy); July 26, 2024 (Pakistan)	99 minutes
Gracie & Pedro: Pets To The Rescue	Canada; South Africa; United States	Kevin Donovan; Gottfried Roodt	GTE Productions; Second Chance Productions	CG animation		May 23, 2024 (Russia); August 9, 2024 (United Kingdom); October 18, 2024 (United States)	87 minutes
Haikyu!! The Dumpster Battle	Japan	Susumu Mitsunaka	Production I.G.	Traditional		February 16, 2024	85 minutes
Harold and the Purple Crayon	United States	Carlos Saldanha	Columbia Pictures; Davis Entertainment	Traditional; CG animation Live-action		July 21, 2024 (Culver City); August 2, 2024 (United States)	92 minutes
Happy Heroes: Multiverse Rescue	China		Alpha Group Co., Ltd. Guangdong Mingxin Chuangyi Cartoon Co., Ltd.	Traditional		January 20, 2024	102 minutes
The Haunted House Special: Red Eyed Reaper 신비아파트 특별편: 붉은 눈의 사신	South Korea	Park Hong-geun	CJ ENM Co. Studio BAZOOKA	Traditional		August 14, 2024	77 minutes
Hitpig!	United Kingdom; Canada	Cinzia Angelini; David Feiss	Aniventure	CG animation		November 1, 2024 (United States)	86 minutes
Hola Frida!	France; Canada	André Kadi; Karine Vézina	Tobo Média; Du Coup Animation; Haut et Court	Flash animation		June 15, 2024 (Annecy); October 25, 2024 (Morelia); February 12, 2025 (France)	82 minutes
Hump	Germany; Belgium	Peter Dodd; Amin Matalqa	Odin's Eye Entertainment; MovieBrats Pictures; Walking The Dog	CG animation		November 15, 2024	
IF	United States	John Krasinski	Paramount Pictures; Sunday Night Productions; Maximum Effort	CG animation Live-action		May 8, 2024 (France); May 17, 2024 (United States)	104 minutes
Inside Out 2	United States	Kelsey Mann	Disney; Pixar Animation Studios	CG animation		June 10, 2024 (El Capitan Theatre); June 14, 2024 (United States)	96 minutes
Into the Wonderwoods; Angelo dans la forêt mystérieuse	France; Luxembourg	Vincent Paronnaud; Alexis Ducord	Je Suis Bien Content; Gao Shan Pictures; ZEILT productions	CG animation		May 22, 2024 (Cannes); October 23, 2024 (France)	81 minutes
Iris the Movie: Full Energy!!	Japan	Hiroshi Ikehata	Studio Gokumi	Traditional		May 17, 2024	60 minutes
Johnny Puff: Secret Mission	United States; Spain; Italy	Néstor F. Dennis	Méliès Producciones	CG animation		January 12, 2024	87 minutes
John Vardar vs the Galaxy	North Macedonia; Croatia; Hungary; Bulgaria	Goce Cvetanovski	Lynx Animation Studios; 3D2D Animatori; Invictus; Umatik Entertainment	Flash animation Traditional; CG animation		October 5, 2024 (Sitges); November 1, 2024 (North Macedonia); March 27, 2025 (Hungary)	86 minutes
Justice League: Crisis on Infinite Earths – Part One	United States	Jeff Wamester	Warner Bros. Animation; DC Studios	Traditional		January 9, 2024	93 minutes
Justice League: Crisis on Infinite Earths – Part Two	United States	Jeff Wamester	Warner Bros. Animation; DC Studios	Traditional		April 23, 2024	95 minutes
Justice League: Crisis on Infinite Earths – Part Three	United States	Jeff Wamester	Warner Bros. Animation; DC Studios	Traditional		July 16, 2024	98 minutes
Koyomi Vamp	Japan	Tatsuya Oishi	Shaft	Traditional		January 12, 2024	144 minutes
Kung Fu Panda 4	United States	Mike Mitchell	Universal Pictures; DreamWorks Animation	CG animation		March 3, 2024 (The Grove); March 8, 2024 (United States)	94 minutes
Liberato's Secret	Italy	Francesco Lettieri; Giorgio Testi; Giuseppe Squillaci; LRNZ	Red Private	Traditional; Live-action		May 9, 2024	90 minutes
Little Emma	United States; China; Ireland	Leo Lewis Liao	Bootleg Universe; Fís Éireann / Screen Ireland; Gold Valley Films; Neko Productions; Toonz Media Group	CG animation		September 6, 2024 (United States)	106 minutes
Living Large	Czech Republic; France; Slovakia	Kristina Dufková	Barletta; Czech Television; NOVINSKI; Novanima Productions	Stop-Motion		June 2024 (Annecy); June 29, 2024 (Karlovy Vary); October 17, 2024	80 minutes
Look Back	Japan	Kiyotaka Oshiyama	Studio Durian	Traditional		June 10, 2024 (Annecy); June 28, 2024 (Japan)	58 minutes
The Lord of the Rings: The War of the Rohirrim	New Zealand; Japan; United States	Kenji Kamiyama	New Line Cinema; Warner Bros. Animation; Sola Entertainment	Traditional		December 13, 2024	134 minutes
Love Live! Nijigasaki High School Idol Club Final Chapter (Part 1)	Japan	Tomoyuki Kawamura	Sunrise	Traditional		September 6, 2024	59 minutes
Mars	United States	Sevan Najarian	Midnight Kids Studios Inc. Whitest Kids Films LLC.	Flash animation		June 6, 2024 (Tribeca); March 13, 2026 (United States)	85 minutes
Maya, Give Me a Title	France	Michel Gondry	Partizan Films	Cutout; Stop-Motion		October 2, 2024 (Theatres); February 2025 (Berlinale)	61 minutes
Megamind vs. the Doom Syndicate	United States	Eric Fogel	DreamWorks Animation Television	CG animation		March 1, 2024	85 minutes
Memoir of a Snail	Australia	Adam Elliot	Arenamedia; Snails Pace Films	Stop-Motion		June 10, 2024 (Annecy); October 17, 2024 (Australia)	94 minutes
Moana 2	United States	David Derrick Jr.	Walt Disney Animation Studios	CG animation		November 27, 2024	100 minutes
Mobile Suit Gundam SEED Freedom	Japan	Mitsuo Fukuda	Bandai Namco Filmworks	Traditional		January 26, 2024	124 minutes
Mononoke the Movie: Phantom in the Rain	Japan	Kenji Nakamura	EOTA	Traditional		July 26, 2024	89 minutes
Moonzy: Homecoming	Russia	Konstantin Bronzit	CTB Film Company; Melnitsa Animation Studio	CG animation		August 29, 2024	78 minutes
The Most Precious of Cargoes	France	Michel Hazanavicius	Les Films du Fleuve; Prima Linea Productions; Studiocanal; Les Compagnons du Cinema; Ex Nihilo	Traditional		May 2024 (Cannes); November 20, 2024 (France)	81 minutes
Mufasa: The Lion King	United States	Barry Jenkins	Walt Disney Pictures; Walt Disney Studios Motion Pictures	CG animation		December 9, 2024 (Dolby Theatre); December 20, 2024 (United States)	118 minutes
Mustafa	Turkey	H. Sinan Güngör; Ibrahim Turali; Halil Öztürk	Outline Animation and Games	CG animation		October 25, 2024	75 minutes
My Hero Academia: You're Next	Japan	Tensai Okamura	Bones	Traditional		August 2, 2024	110 minutes
My Oni Girl	Japan	Tomotaka Shibayama	Studio Colorido	Traditional		May 24, 2024	112 minutes
Nature Cat's Nature Movie Special Extraordinaire	United States	Adam Rudman; David Rudman; Todd Hannert	PBS Kids; Spiffy Pictures	Flash animation		April 22, 2024	53 minutes
Night of the Zoopocalypse	Canada; France; Belgium	Ricardo Curtis; Rodrigo Perez-Castro	Elevation Pictures; Apollo Films; House of Cool; Mac Guff	CG animation		October 6, 2024 (Sitges); January 29, 2025 (France); March 7, 2025 (United States/Canada)	91 minutes
Niko - Beyond the Northern Lights	Finland; Germany; Denmark; Ireland	Kari Juusonen; Jørgen Lerdam	Anima Vitae; Animaker; Ulysses Filmproduktion; Moetion Films; A. Film Production	CG animation		October 11, 2024	86 minutes
No Time to Spy: A Loud House Movie	United States	Kyle Marshall	Paramount+ Nickelodeon Movies	Flash animation		June 21, 2024	81 minutes
Noah's Ark	Brazil; India	Sérgio Machado; René Veilleux	Globo Filmes; Gullane; NIP; Symbiosys Technologies; VideoFilmes	CG animation		January 5, 2024 (South Africa); November 7, 2024 (Brazil)	96 minutes
Olivia & the Clouds	Dominican Republic	Tomás Pichardo Espaillat	Guasábara Cine; Historias de Bibi; Cine Chani	Rotoscope; Traditional; Cutout; Live-Action		August 15, 2024 (Locarno)	81 minutes
Orion and the Dark	United States	Sean Charmatz	Netflix; DreamWorks Animation	CG animation		February 2, 2024	93 minutes
Out of the Nest	Thailand; China	Arturo A. Hernandez; Andrew Gordon; Veerapatra Jinanavin	Base FX; Shellhut Entertainment	CG animation		June 13, 2024 (Annecy); September 5, 2024 (Thailand); September 7, 2024 (China)	84 minutes
Overlord: The Sacred Kingdom	Japan	Naoyuki Itō	Madhouse	Traditional		September 20, 2024	135 minutes
Paddington in Peru	United Kingdom; France; Japan; United States	Dougal Wilson	StudioCanal	CG animation Live-action		November 8, 2024 (United Kingdom); February 14, 2025 (United States); February 5, 2025 (France)	106 minutes
Panda Bear in Africa	Denmark; Netherlands; France; Germany; Estonia; China	Richard Claus; Karsten Kiilerich	A. Film Production; Cool Beans; Le Pacte; Katuni Animation; Comet Film	CG animation		February 15, 2024 (Berlin); October 16, 2024 (Netherlands)	84 minutes
Piece by Piece	United States	Morgan Neville	The Lego Group; Tremolo Productions; I Am Other	CG animation		August 30, 2024 (Telluride); October 11, 2024 (United States)	93 minutes
Pinocchio and the Water of Life	Spain; Estonia; United States	Viktor Lakisov	Asymmetric Studios OU; Asymmetric Universe S.L.	CG animation		December 12, 2024	85 minutes
Pleasant Goat and Big Big Wolf: The World Guardians	China	Huang Junming; Chen Lijin	Alpha Group; Creative Power Entertaining; Huaxia Film Distribution; Youku Information Technology (Beijing); Guangdong Mingxing Chuangyi Cartoon; Shanghai Tao Piao Piao Movie and TV Culture; Zhejiang Dong Yang Microcosmic Pictures	Flash animation		July 19, 2024	96 minutes
The Proud Princess	Czech Republic	Radek Beran	Luminar Film; PFX	CG animation		November 7, 2024	84 minutes
Pui Pui Molcar The Movie MOLMAX	Japan	Mankyū	Shin-Ei Animation	CG animation		November 29, 2024	69 minutes
Rabbits Kingdom the Movie	Japan	Masayoshi Ozaki	Studio Sign	Traditional		June 14, 2024	84 minutes
Rebellious	United Kingdom; Cyprus	Alex Tsitsilin	Creation Entertainment Media; Magic Frame Animation	CG animation		October 25, 2024	94 minutes
Red vs. Blue: Restoration	United States	Matt Hullum	Rooster Teeth	CG animation		May 21, 2024	85 minutes
Road to Summer Sonia	Japan	Shū Honma	P.A. Works	Traditional		March 1, 2024	119 minutes
Rocket Club: Across the Cosmos	Canada	Steve Ball; Hailey Kathler	ICON Creative Studio	CG animation		March 8, 2024	68 minutes
Robotia, the Movie	Argentina; Spain; Costa Rica	Diego Cagide; Diego Lucero	Malabar Animation Studio; Dibulitoon Studio; Paycom Cinema; Tropics Creative	CG animation		June 7, 2024 (Spain); August 29, 2024 (Argentina)	86 minutes
Ryan's World the Movie: Titan Universe Adventure	United States; Japan	Albie Hecht	Shin-Ei Animation (animation)	Traditional; Live-action		April 6, 2024 (CIFF); August 16, 2024 (United States)	83 minutes
Savages	Switzerland; France; Belgium	Claude Barras	Nadasdy Film; Haut et Cort; Panique!	Stop-Motion		May 18, 2024 (Cannes)	87 minutes
Saving Bikini Bottom: The Sandy Cheeks Movie	United States	Liza Johnson	Netflix; Nickelodeon Movies	CG animation Live-action		August 2, 2024	82 minutes
The Sloth Lane	Australia	Tania Vincent; Ricard Cussó	Like A Photon Creative; Screen Queensland Studios	CG animation		June 10, 2024 (Annecy); June 15, 2024 (Sydney); July 25, 2024 (Australia)	89 minutes
Sonic the Hedgehog 3	United States; Japan; Canada	Jeff Fowler	Paramount Pictures; Original Film; Sega; Blur Studio; Marza Animation Planet	CG animation Live-action		December 10, 2024 (Empire Leicester Square); December 20, 2024 (United States); December 27, 2024 (Japan)	110 minutes
Spellbound	United States	Vicky Jenson	Netflix; Skydance Animation	CG animation		November 22, 2024	109 minutes
Spermageddon	Norway	Tommy Wirkola; Rasmus A. Sivertsen	Qvisten Animation; 74 Entertainment	CG animation		June 10, 2024 (Annecy); February 28, 2025 (Norway)	80 minutes
Sunburnt Unicorn	Canada	Nick Johnson	2448223 Alberta	CG animation		June 10, 2024 (Annecy)	81 minutes
Super Charlie	Sweden; Denmark	Jon Holmberg	A. Film Production; Film i Skåne; Nordisk Film; Slugger Film; Sveriges Television	CG animation		December 25, 2024	80 minutes
The Super Elfkins	Germany	Ute von Münchow-Pohl	ARX Anima Animation Studio; Akkord Film Produktion GmbH; SERU Animation; Tobis Film	CG animation		December 24, 2024	76 minutes
SuperKlaus	Spain; Canada	Steve Majaury; Andrea Sebastián	3 Doubles Producciones; Capitán Araña; PVP Media	CG animation		November 28, 2024	88 minutes
That Christmas	United Kingdom; United States	Simon Otto	Netflix Animation; Locksmith Animation; DNEG Animation	CG animation		October 19, 2024 (68th BFI London Film Festival); December 4, 2024 (Netflix)	97 minutes
Thelma the Unicorn	United States	Jared Hess; Lynn Wang	Netflix Animation; Scholastic Entertainment; Netflix Studios	CG animation		May 17, 2024	93 minutes
The Tiger's Apprentice	United States	Raman Hui	Paramount+ Paramount Animation	CG animation		January 27, 2024 (Los Angeles); February 2, 2024 (United States)	84 minutes
Transformers One	United States	Josh Cooley	Paramount Animation; Hasbro Entertainment; Di Bonaventura Pictures	CG animation		September 11, 2024 (Sydney); September 20, 2024 (United States)	104 minutes
Trapezium	Japan	Masahiro Shinohara	CloverWorks	Traditional		May 10, 2024	94 minutes
Ultraman: Rising	United States; Japan	Shannon Tindle; John Aoshima	Netflix Animation; Tsuburaya Productions; Industrial Light & Magic	CG animation		June 12, 2024 (Annecy Festival); June 14, 2024 (Worldwide)	117 minutes
Uma & Haggen; Uma y Haggen: Princesa y Vikingo	Mexico	Eduardo Cabrera; Martín Claudón; Benito Fernández	Ithrax Studio; Santo Domingo Animation	Traditional		January 4, 2024	94 minutes
Uma Musume Pretty Derby: Beginning of a New Era	Japan	Ken Yamamoto	CygamesPictures	Traditional		May 24, 2024	108 minutes
Wallace & Gromit: Vengeance Most Fowl	United Kingdom	Nick Park; Merlin Crossingham	Netflix; Aardman Animations	Stop-Motion		October 27, 2024 (AFI); December 25, 2024 (BBC); January 3, 2025 (Netflix)	79 minutes
Watchmen: Chapter I	United States	Brandon Vietti	Warner Bros. Animation; Paramount Pictures; DC Entertainment	CG animation Traditional		August 13, 2024	84 minutes
Watchmen: Chapter II	United States	Brandon Vietti	Warner Bros. Animation; Paramount Pictures; DC Entertainment	CG animation Traditional		November 26, 2024	89 minutes
Wild Kratts: Our Blue and Green World	United States	Chris Kratt; Martin Kratt	PBS Kids; Kratt Brothers Company; 9 Story Media Group	Flash animation		April 1, 2024	48 minutes
The Wild Robot	United States	Chris Sanders	Universal Pictures; DreamWorks Animation	CG animation		September 8, 2024 (TIFF); September 27, 2024 (United States)	101 minutes
Wonderful Pretty Cure! The Movie: A Grand Adventure in a Thrilling Game World!	Japan	Naoki Miyahara	Toei Animation	Traditional		September 13, 2024	70 minutes
Woody Woodpecker Goes to Camp	United States	Jon Rosenbaum	Universal 1440 Entertainment; Universal Animation Studios	CG animation Live-action		April 12, 2024	98 minutes
Yumi's Cells: The Movie	South Korea	Kim Da-hee	Studio N Locus Animation	CG animation		April 3, 2024	93 minutes
YuruYuri	Japan	Naoyuki Tatsuwa	Passione; Studio Lings	Traditional		February 2, 2024; June 21, 2024	43 minutes (both films)
Zak & Wowo: The Legend of Lendarys	France; Canada	Philippe Duchêne; Cuvelier Jean-Baptiste	2 Minutes Animation; Caramel Films; PM SA; Perpetua Capital	CG animation		July 3, 2024	85 minutes
Zegapain STA	Japan	Masami Shimoda	Bandai Namco Filmworks	Traditional		August 16, 2024	90 minutes

== Highest-grossing animated films ==
The following is a list of the 10 highest-grossing animated feature films first released in 2024.

Rank	Title	Distributor	Worldwide gross	Ref
1	Inside Out 2	Walt Disney Studios Motion Pictures	$1,698,778,437	
2	Moana 2	Walt Disney Studios Motion Pictures	$1,058,741,595	
3	Despicable Me 4	Universal Pictures	$971,030,070	
4	Mufasa: The Lion King	Walt Disney Studios Motion Pictures	$717,019,861	
5	Kung Fu Panda 4	Universal Pictures	$547,812,900	
6	The Wild Robot	Universal Pictures	$334,144,308	
7	Boonie Bears: Time Twist	Fantawild	$275,866,316	
8	The Garfield Movie	Sony Pictures Releasing	$257,211,519	
9	Transformers One	Paramount Pictures	$129,364,141	
10	Detective Conan: The Million-dollar Pentagram	Toho	$108,136,957	

=== Box office records ===
- The Kung Fu Panda film series grossed over $2 billion with the release of Kung Fu Panda 4.
- The Boonie Bears franchise gross over $1 billion with the release of Boonie Bears: Time Twist.
- Moana 2 became the 56th film and the 13th animated film to gross $1 billion worldwide.
  - The Moana film series grossed over $1 billion with the release of Moana 2.
  - The Moana film series grossed over $1.5 billion with the release of Moana 2.
- Inside Out 2 became the 54th film to gross $1 billion worldwide, and the 12th animated film to do so.
  - Inside Out 2 became the fastest animated film to gross $1 billion worldwide, doing so in 17 days, surpassing Frozen 2, which did so in 21 days.
  - It has the best second weekend for any animated film, grossing around $100 million in its second week, a 35 percent drop from its $135 million gross in its first week, surpassing The Super Mario Bros. Movie. It also has the best second week drop for any film that debuted at over $150 million.
  - It had the third-highest theatrical opening for an animated film of all time, behind Incredibles 2 and The Lion King.
  - It had the fourth-highest PG-rated opening ever, behind Beauty and the Beast, Incredibles 2 and The Lion King.
  - It had the third-biggest domestic Monday for any animated film, behind Incredibles 2 and Shrek 2.
  - It became the first film since Barbie to gross $100 million during its debut.
  - It became the highest grossing Pixar film of all time, surpassing Incredibles 2.
  - The Inside Out film series grossed over $2 billion with the release of Inside Out 2.

== See also ==
- List of animated television series of 2024
