= For My Best Family =

2024 art exhibition

- Artist: Meriem Bennani; Orian Barki
- Year: 2024
- Medium: Mechanical installation (Sole Crushing); Computer-animated feature (For Aicha)
- Location: Fondazione Prada; Milan

For My Best Family was a 2024 art exhibition by Meriem Bennani and Orian Barki, funded by the Milan host facility Fondazione Prada. Developed over a two-year period, it featured two components on different levels of the Prada, a mechanical installation named Sole Crushing and a computer-animated film entitled For Aicha. The latter revisited the universe of Bennani and Barki's 2020 web series 2 Lizards, and was the first animated feature produced in Morocco.

The exhibition ran at the Prada premises between 31 October 2024 and 24 February 2025, and was well-received by Italian outlets. Both portions of Family resurfaced as separate attractions in late 2025: an extended version of Aicha which received festival release as the retitled Bouchra, and a standalone edition of Sole Crushing that debuted in Paris.

== Overview ==
For My Best Family was held across two levels of Milan's Fondazione Prada during its run. The ground floor was occupied by a mechanical installation named Sole Crushing, while the upstairs Cinema Godard section on the first floor showed a computer-animated film entitled For Aicha.

Sole Crushing comprised no fewer than 190 flip-flops laid out across six platforms, which "slap against panels, creating a riotous, polyphonic composition and choreography....Most of them face a small, central podium bearing a single pair of flip-flops whose slapping movements are occasionally isolated, creating a sense of conversation between an individual and a crowd." For Aicha—the 73-minute progenitor of what became Bouchra—told the story of a 35-year-old queer Moroccan canid filmmaker (Note: Depending on the source, Bouchra has been described as a jackal (during the 2024 Prada release) or coyote (during the 2025 festival run).) coming to terms with her sexuality and career through a series of phone calls to her Casablanca mother. Sole Crushing's sound played during Aicha, particularly during the plot's "points of tension": "As the two main characters reach their resolution, so does the composition of the footwear when they finish their symphony."

== Development ==
With funding from the Fondazione Prada, Meriem Bennani worked on For My Best Family over a two-year period, with different collaborators on each portion: Sole Crushing featured Reba Senhaji (a musician performing as Cheb Runner), while For Aicha reunited her with creative partner Orian Barki (with whom she co-created the 2020 web series 2 Lizards). All three were natives of the Middle East and North Africa (MENA) region: Bennani and Runner from Morocco, and Barki from Tel Aviv, Israel. In response to Prada's development deal, Bennani insisted that the exhibition include a feature film.

Family was Bennani's "first solo exhibit in an Italian institution." In Prada's promotion, she discussed the two components thus:

"[O]ne of the central themes of For My Best Family is knowing how to be together, wondering where a person begins and ends. The film focuses on a mother and daughter learning to be together, while in the installation the concept is more abstract and refers to collectivity in a broader sense, nonverbal moments of encounter in which there seems to be a force that takes the form of a multiform body. Like a puppet, the multitude becomes a single thing, a single voice, a single way of acting, and everyone knows exactly what they have to do at that moment, rhythmically or singing, for example how to use their bodies and stomp their feet. I like to use animation as a means of questioning togetherness and what it means to be alive."

For Aicha was the first animated feature produced in Morocco, and was set in the same universe as 2 Lizards. Nearly 20 crew members in New York City animated the film on the Blender platform under a budget and 1 1/2-year deadline; motion capture was also used. Online videos of fans at Casablanca football matches served as Bennani's inspiration for Sole Crushing.

Another 2 Lizards crew member, Flavien Berger, worked on the music in Aicha. Influenced by Berber customs and based on his initial perception of the characters, Berger's score would eventually bring Who Framed Roger Rabbit to mind for Bennani and Barki. Runner composed the cues heard in Aicha's Casablanca radio broadcasts; he and Bennani also wrote the 45-minute backing track for Sole Crushing.

== Themes ==
The two components of Family "explore the centrality of human relationships, whether familial or collective," and "seek to understand the dynamics of being connected, like a family," while also recalling the artistic traits of early 20th-century animation. Both use breathing as a metaphorical motif: Sole Crushing uses pneumatic pumps, while Aicha's protagonist Bouchra takes shots of Ventolin to cope with her asthma symptoms. A writer for Italy's designboom noted the mutual relationships present in both components: Bouchra depends on Aicha, while the shoes depend on the pneumatic system that operates them.

The exhibition's title is referenced in one of the film's last lines, spoken by Bouchra's aunt: "I am really good because I am here with my best family." Bennani admitted that this sentence "is grammatically incorrect" in English, but she and the Aicha team left it in the dialogue since it is open to interpretations by the viewer.

== Tenure ==
For My Best Family received its earliest mention in a late January 2024 article on Italian art site RED•EYE. The names of Family's two components were revealed in Mexico's Noir Magazine by late July, and Italy's Artribune the following month. Following a preview on 30 October, the Fondazione Prada held Bennani and Barki's exhibit between 31 October 2024 and 24 February 2025. (Note: Prada's official page listed 26 February as the intended end date.)

== Reception ==
Family was well-received by Italian arts outlets. The staff of Gilt Magazine said on its opening day, "If you are passionate about contemporary art or simply curious, [this exhibition] offers a must-see opportunity to explore the new boundaries of art and visual storytelling." Laura McLean-Ferris of Mousse magazine wrote, "Sole Crushing is a moving, thrilling piece of work, but gains even more nuance from its pairing with For Aicha." Ilaria Introzzi of Espoarte called Family "an act of love by the Moroccan artist [Bennani], towards herself and visitors. She devotes herself to both portions, free of towering complications." Near the end of its run, Jace Clayton of 4Columns approved of its welcoming atmosphere despite the Prada building's "austere and unwelcoming" design.

== Legacy ==
In late 2025, the two components of For My Best Family resurfaced separately across different venues. An extended 83-minute edit of For Aicha entered the festival circuit under a new name, Bouchra, while Sole Crushing was relaunched in a different configuration at Paris' Lafayette Anticipations on 22 October.

== Bibliography ==
- Bennani, Meriem; Barki, Orian (2024). Mainetti, Mario; Gravina, Niccolò (eds.). For My Best Family: For Aicha / Sole Crushing (in English and Italian). Milan: Fondazione Prada. ISBN 978-88-87029-92-5.
