= Bouchra =

2024 adult computer-animated film

- Theatrical release poster
- Directed by: Meriem Bennani; Orian Barki
- Written by: Meriem Bennani; Orian Barki; Ayla Mrabet
- Produced by: John Michael Boling; Jason Coombs
- Starring: Meriem Bennani; Fatim-Zahra Alami; Yto Barrada; Dounia Berrada; Orian Barki; Ariana Faye Allensworth
- Cinematography: John Michael Boling
- Music by: Flavien Berger
- Production companies: Fondazione Prada; 2 Lizards Production; Hi Production; SB Films
- Distributed by: Film Movement (United States)
- Release dates: 31 October 2024 (Milan); 5 September 2025 (Toronto); 27 September 2025 (New York); 10 October 2025 (Bordeaux); 19 October 2025 (Rome); 26 June 2026 (United States)
- Running time: 73 minutes (original Milan cut); 83 minutes (festival run)
- Countries: Italy; Morocco; United States
- Languages: Moroccan Arabic; French; English

Bouchra (French pronunciation: [buʃ.ra]), originally titled For Aicha, is a 2024 adult animated art drama film directed, written by, and starring Meriem Bennani and Orian Barki. Commissioned by Milan's Fondazione Prada and animated on the Blender platform, it is the first feature film directed by Bennani and Barki. Bennani voices the titular character—a lesbian Moroccan canid in Brooklyn, New York City—in a semi-autobiographical account which chronicles her personal and sexual exploration amid a series of telephone calls with her Casablanca mother.

The film is set in the same universe as 2 Lizards, a web series helmed by Bennani and Barki during the COVID-19 pandemic. Production lasted for two years as part of an art exhibition Bennani created for Prada's hometown facility, and involved nearly 20 crew members in New York. Live-action footage was used for the backgrounds, while Bouchra and Aicha's on-screen conversations—added in the later stages of production—were based on Bennani's actual recordings. Several other members of the 2 Lizards team returned for the follow-up, among them composer Flavien Berger. Amid creative struggles and script rewrites, Bennani sought to conceive a story that would resonate with both Western and Middle Eastern audiences.

Bouchra debuted at the Prada premises under its original name, For Aicha, on 31 October 2024. Through a retitled and re-edited version, the film made its festival debut in Toronto and New York's 2025 editions, marking Bennani's first appearance at those venues in three years. It became the first animated work nominated for Toronto's Platform Prize, an honour that Ukrainian live-action candidate To the Victory! ultimately won. A month afterward, it received the Gold Q-Hugo at the Chicago International Film Festival's LGBTQ+-oriented OutLook program. The film was released by Film Movement in the U.S. (via international sales company Lucky Number) on 26 June 2026.

Critics positively reviewed Bouchra, with many of them commenting on its cultural and LGBTQ+ themes, psychological motifs, blending of reality and filmed fiction, and its styles of animation and narrative. Several compared it to Disney's 2016 feature Zootopia and the works of Richard Linklater, but criticized the quality of the CGI and noted that the metafictional structure might be difficult to follow. The film was met with enthusiasm across its festival screenings and gained popularity with the furry userbase of the Letterboxd site.

== Synopsis ==
Bouchra, a 35-year-old lesbian Moroccan canid, works as a filmmaker in Brooklyn, New York City; her mother, Aicha, lives in Casablanca. After a period of creative drought, Bouchra embarks on a journey of exploring herself and her sexual identity during her work on a semi-autobiographical film set in Morocco, where her character has an affair with another woman and deals with her relatives. Willing to move on with her career, she also yearns for reconciliation with Aicha through a series of telephone calls; this follows up on a coming-out letter she wrote to her parents nine years prior. The storyline involves real and fictional versions of both characters; according to Jace Clayton of 4Columns, "metafictional elements get conveyed via text messages, video calls, visual and sonic puns, a play-within-a-film [where] young animals dress up as vegetables for their school performance, pen-and-ink storyboarding of the scene being shown, and more." In the closing scenes, Bouchra and her mother finally meet at a dinner table, accompanied by their relatives; she breaks her silence by explaining what her production deals with. This leads the former's aunt, Yamna, to quip that "I am with my best family."

== Voice cast ==
- Meriem Bennani as Bouchra, a canid who works as a filmmaker in Brooklyn and doubles as her voice actor's "alter-ego"; her fictional counterpart is voiced by Fatim-Zahra Alami. She converses with her Moroccan friends and relatives in Arabic and French, while also using English as a New Yorker. In contrast with her real-life counterparts' carnivorous nature, she is highly vulnerable in trait. Thanks to her asthma symptoms, she resorts to shots of Ventolin to cope. Bouchra shares her name with Bennani's real aunt, whom Yamna—a middle-aged and single Moroccan—substitutes in-universe.
- Yto Barrada as Aicha, a cardiologist in Casablanca. She stands in for Bennani's real mother, whom Barrada dubbed over. The Aicha in Bouchra's universe is a painter and sculptor, voiced by Dounia Berrada.
- Orian Barki as Yani, a Brooklyn lizard. Yani was formerly one of the unnamed titular characters in Bennani and Barki's web series 2 Lizards.
- Salima Dhaibi as Lamia, a Moroccan bear whom Bouchra gradually falls in love with.
- Ariana Faye Allensworth as Nikki, a cow who is Bouchra's ex-girlfriend and proposes a job for her. Allensworth had previously voiced an impala in 2 Lizards.
- Fayçal Azizi, Hassan Hamdani, Bouchra Benzeki, and Lil Patty voice additional characters.

== Production ==
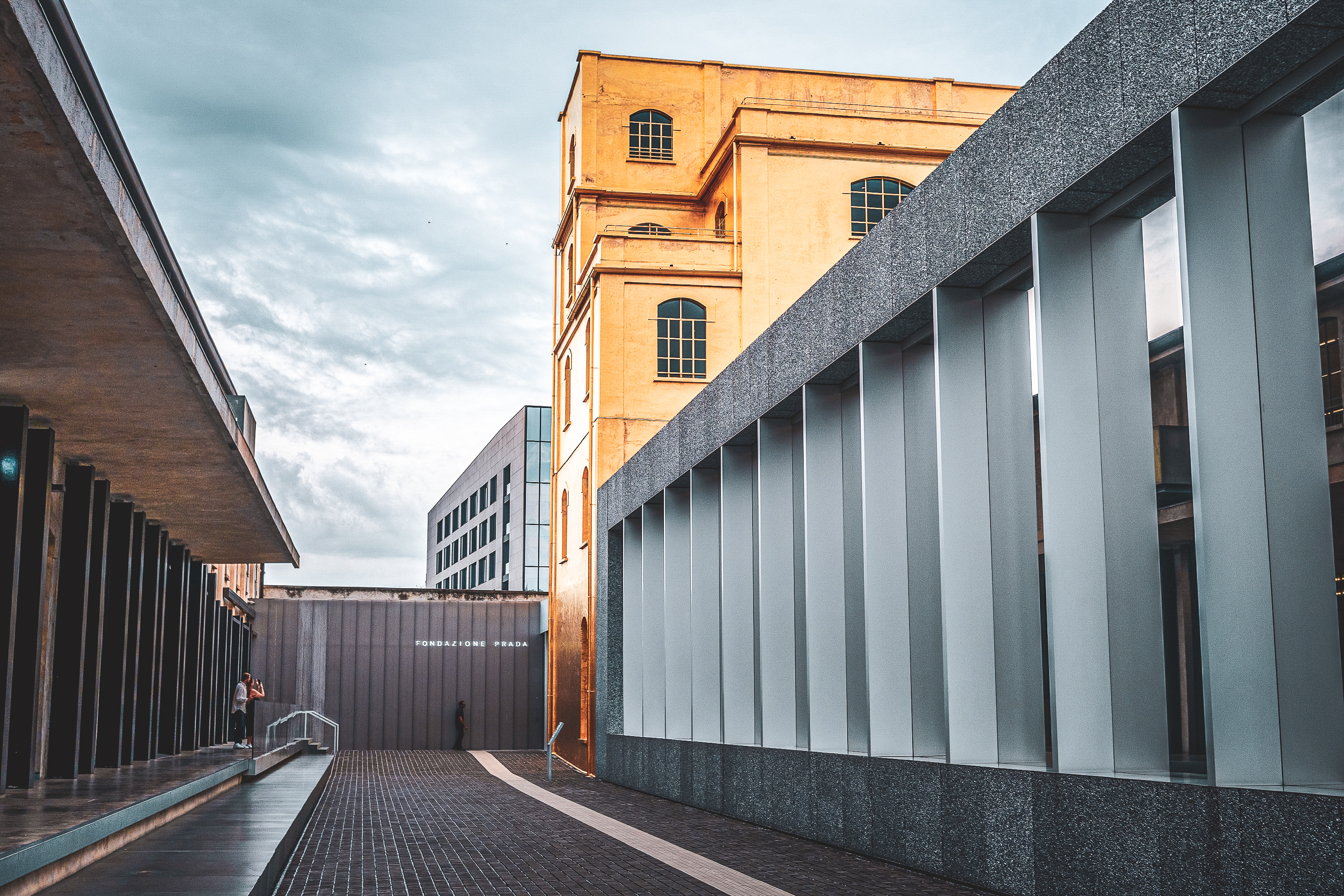
Milan's Fondazione Prada (pictured in 2025) funded and hosted Meriem Bennani's 2024 art exhibition For My Best Family, whose animated component For Aicha would evolve into Bouchra.

"What Orian and I have in common is we look for when something feels true. It's a balance between a certain tenderness and humor that is not trying to be cool or relevant—it just is. That's been our compass for this film, especially as we explore daughterhood and queerness in a North African context, which is often flattened by imported ideas of what 'coming out' should look like."

— Meriem Bennani, as quoted by Variety

=== Background and funding ===
Bouchra is the directorial debut for its creators, Meriem Bennani and Orian Barki. Based in New York City, Bennani and Barki respectively hailed from Rabat, Morocco and Tel Aviv, Israel. The film is set in the same universe as 2 Lizards, an eight-episode web series the creator duo previously helmed during the COVID-19 pandemic; their production company was later named after it. Both enjoyed working together on the series, and wished to do something longer. After the Fondazione Prada of Milan gave her an offer to develop an exhibition, Bennani insisted that a feature film be included in the deal.

Prada would fund Bennani's film as part of the resulting showcase, For My Best Family. Family, which also featured a mechanical installation named Sole Crushing, was made over a two-year period and was "her first solo exhibition in an Italian institution." In Prada's promotion, Bennani discussed the two components thus:

"[O]ne of the central themes of For My Best Family is knowing how to be together, wondering where a person begins and ends. The film focuses on a mother and daughter learning to be together, while in the installation the concept is more abstract and refers to collectivity in a broader sense, nonverbal moments of encounter in which there seems to be a force that takes the form of a multiform body. Like a puppet, the multitude becomes a single thing, a single voice, a single way of acting, and everyone knows exactly what they have to do at that moment, rhythmically or singing, for example how to use their bodies and stomp their feet. I like to use animation as a means of questioning togetherness and what it means to be alive."

=== Writing ===
Bouchra is a semi-autobiographical account of the life of Bennani, who voices the titular character; the phone calls depicted in the scenes were based on recordings of the actual French-language conversations, which also served as research resources and arrived in the later stages of production. Bennani endured creative difficulties during the making of the project, particularly as she struggled to conceive a story that would ideally appeal to both Western and Middle Eastern audiences. As she summarised during the 2025 Toronto International Film Festival screenings, Bouchra constituted "the story of us making the film. Struggling to make the film. And me calling my mom."

The film bore the working title of Good News early in development; Good News was a translation of "Bouchra", the name of Bennani's real aunt. During production, it was renamed For Aicha and underwent constant script rewrites. The original version focused on Bouchra's trip back home to Morocco, but was scrapped when Bennani and Barki ran into plot issues amid both their lack of writing experience and attempts to avoid clichéd Westernised views of the LGBTQ+ experience. An unsuccessful rewrite implored them to work more of the mother's point of view into the plot; the phone calls that followed provided Bennani with a story that surpassed the crew's previous attempts and inspired them to add a metafictional aspect to the script. Bennani was given permission by her mother to use the recordings and became an interpreter for their playback. Half of the film's dialogue is in English and the remainder in French and Arabic.

Depending on the source, the titular character has been described as a jackal (during the 2024 Prada release) or coyote (during the 2025 festival run). In 2024, Bennani told the Italian Architectural Digest that she made Bouchra a jackal due to the predominance of this species across North Africa. At a Toronto Q&A session, Barki offered a different story: While the crew honoured Bennani's choice at first, they soon settled for a coyote instead, which "ended up impacting the personality of the character. As Barki said at TIFF, Bouchra is very 'contained, well-behaved, she wants to fit into her worlds. But the coyote is a wild animal, with potential to get angry.' Barki wanted Bouchra's presence to 'hold that energy'." Bennani also modelled many of the other characters after her real relatives.

=== Animation and music ===
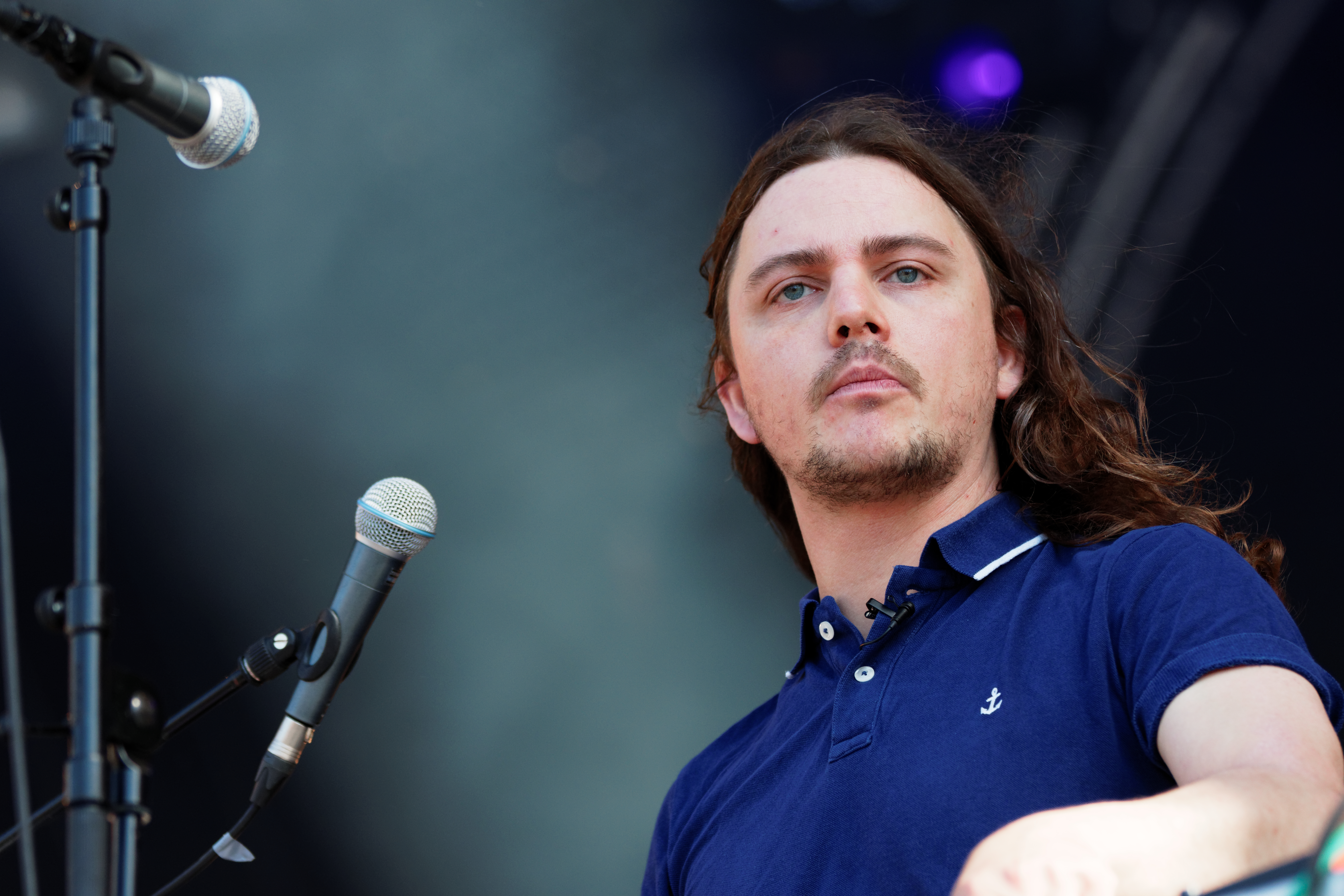
Bouchra involved various cast and crew from Bennani and Barki's 2 Lizards web series, among them composer Flavien Berger (pictured in 2016).

Aided by the Blender animation software, a New York City crew of almost 20 members worked on For Aicha under a 1 1/2-year deadline and budget. Utilising the same blend of documentary and animation previously showcased in 2 Lizards became "a major challenge for the team." This involved different production methods for different scenes and improvisations that made the style comparable to higher-budgeted works.

Bennani and Barki took visual cues from Chungking Express (1994), Mulholland Drive (2001), and the works of Pedro Almodóvar. The "low-lit metropolitan" skylines of Casablanca and Brooklyn were shot in live action, then processed in CGI; the interior sets were fully computer-animated. Thanks to the Fondazione Prada's involvement, the animators used clothing designs from its sister firm, Prada, for some of the characters' wardrobe. Other outfits were based on what the real-life actors wore. Becky Akinyode, who once played a leopard in 2 Lizards, returned as the CGI stylist for Bennani's character. Cinematographer John Michael Boling and long-term collaborator Jason Coombs "came out of semi-retirement" for For Aicha, and Coombs frequently acted out character animation in motion capture suits along with Bennani in addition to traditional rig animation.

The first of two sex scenes made for the film was set in Morocco, and became the second shown in story order; for the other one, two friends of the creators acted in reference footage. While making those scenes, the creator duo tackled the portrayal of kisses between animal characters who sported "long muzzles".

For Aicha's composer, Flavien Berger, was a close friend of Bennani's who had previously scored three episodes of 2 Lizards. His score, influenced by Berber customs, was based on his initial perception of the characters, and would eventually bring Who Framed Roger Rabbit to mind for Bennani and Barki. The work of guest musician Reda Senhaji, who performs as Cheb Runner, is heard during the film's Casablanca radio broadcasts as well as in Sole Crushing.

== Themes ==
"[Thanks to its animal characters, Bouchra] feels like it's like achieving humanity by moving away from it or something. It's capable of showing the truth about people by stepping away from them."

— Julio Torres, Vulture

Bouchra consists entirely of anthropomorphic animal characters, which various outlets have considered akin to the roster of 2016's Zootopia; various works of the furry community; and the tradition of Aesop's Fables. Jared Mobarak of The Film Stage posits its universe as an adult-oriented alternative to the Disney animated feature, but with better handling of cultural issues. "Rather than have a specific rhyme or reason for which characters are which," Mobarak continues, "I imagine this stylistic choice was made to create a remove from reality while also playing with the notion of children's stories using animals as a teaching tool. It probably also helped cajole friends and family to participate by voicing 'themselves.'" Veronica Neulichedl of Italian entertainment site Taxidrivers saw Bouchra as a metaphor for survival, adaptation, and resilience; her bear friend Lamia a representation for power, courage, and strength; and Nikki the cow a foil for the titular canid's "chaotic energy". The latter "highlights the gap between the personality of the protagonist and the tranquility represented by the former partner."

As stated by Italian outlets, Bennani and Barki's decision to employ all-animal casts in 2 Lizards and Bouchra "proves to be powerful in translating the content of the work outside the box of reality to make it even more open and inclusive," while enabling those characters "to comment on reality through acute irony." In Bouchra itself, it "adds both tenderness and intensity" to the "allegory of family dynamics"; helps form a "surreal narrative that touches on current issues"; effectively represents human qualities, dilemmas, and sensibilities as an indicator of universality; and "serves to efface the usual signifiers that one would associate with a film focalized around a character's sexuality—especially when that character is queer." In similar fashion to Gints Zilbalodis' Flow and Céline Sciamma's Petite Maman and Tomboy, the film uses its technology as "a filter that tells the truth more forcefully." Reviewers of the Milan run stated that the animation helped bring its "weighty subject matter" across and "challenge the limits of representation", while recalling the "abstract and anti-realistic characters" found in the medium's works of the early 20th century.

Lumi Tan of Italian art magazine CURA. called Bouchra a coming-of-age story "that feels less resolute and teleological" than similar works dependent on "facile nostalgia" and heavy on "sing-along soundtracks, fashion mistakes, and winking pop cultural references". The film "adopts a psychological realism that blends nostalgia, sensitivity, and eroticism", per Martha Kirszenbaum of French magazine Les Inrockuptibles. Commentary on the Moroccan diaspora is offered, along with views on migration differentiated from the depictions of Hispanics and Latinos common in American media. Culture clashes and generation gaps, and issues surrounding communication between family members, are also brought up. Bouchra's fear of entering elevators, which implores her to walk eleven floors up her New York apartment, is seen as a metaphor for control loss and inability to escape conversations. As the story progresses, her living conditions improve; her mother Aicha comments on art's healing tendencies at one point.

Lawrence Garcia of In Review Online compared the voice and dialogue work, and stylistic flourishes, to Richard Linklater's oeuvre; he also found the "long-distance" mother-daughter dynamic reminiscent of Joanna Arnow's i hate myself :). (Note: Listed in Garcia 2025 as a 2015 title, but officially premiered in 2013.) "Structurally," he added, "Bouchra has a kind of reflexive, meta-fictional aspect to it", referring to the storyboards and clips from the titular character's work in progress. Bouchra's phone-call scenes mirror one with Bennani's lizard character in the precursor web series.

During the film, Bouchra's openly gay identity is at odds with her family's conservative religious beliefs. Emotionally ostracised by her other relatives, Bouchra also "feels rejected by her mother's silence". As Mobarak writes, "Her sexuality is obviously a cultural sticking point—one born from the societal indoctrination of Aicha and her husband's youth and religion. They never disowned their daughter, but they've also never been comfortable handling their shame." Alessia Baranello of Italian magazine Lampoon made a similar observation, adding that "cultural barriers remain high and conflict is not eschewed...the discomfort [over Bouchra's coming out] remains unsolvable, without a happy ending." Unless she reconciles with Aicha, says Monita Roy Mohan of Geek Girl Authority, Bouchra and her project will not achieve a "breakthrough". "Coming out," says ArtReview's Cici Peng, "is neither linear nor final but an ongoing process of reevaluation, [the film's] narrative frequently revisiting Bouchra's confessional moment" and the calls that soon follow, "examining anew their diverging version of events."

The word "gay" is not heard until Bouchra and Aicha have dinner together during the closing scenes. John Lynn of the International Cinephile Society observed the uncompromising tone in the depiction of Bouchra's issues.

One of the film's last lines, spoken by Bouchra's aunt, echoes the title of the Prada exhibition it was made for: "I am really good because I am here with my best family." Bennani admitted that this sentence "is grammatically incorrect" in English, but she and the For Aicha team left it in the dialogue since it is open to interpretations by the viewer.

== Release ==
External media

Images
- Creators Bennani and Barki at the New York Film Festival premiere on 27 September 2025. By Dia Dipasupil, courtesy of Getty Images.

Video
- The crew's discussion on Bouchra at the New York Film Festival. Official YouTube upload by Film at Lincoln Center (29 September 2025).

For Aicha's parent exhibition, For My Best Family, received its earliest mention in a late January 2024 article on Italian art site RED•EYE. The names of Family's two components were revealed in Mexico's Noir Magazine by late July, and Italy's Artribune the following month. Following a preview on 30 October, Milan host facility Fondazione Prada first screened For Aicha's original 73-minute cut in its Cinema Godard section between 31 October 2024 and 24 February 2025. (Note: Prada's official page listed 26 February as the intended end date.) (Note: The Cinema Godard was on the first floor, while Sole Crushing occupied the ground floor.) After its Prada run ended, Bennani and Barki animated several minutes of new scenes featuring their own characters (thanks to audience feedback) and the Brooklyn canid's ex-girlfriend, thanks to additional funding.

In late August 2025, film-sales company Lucky Number acquired the duo's animated feature under its new name, Bouchra. With a new 83-minute runtime, it began its festival run on 5 September, when the Toronto International Film Festival held its North American premiere. On 27 September, the film made its U.S. debut as a New York Film Festival Currents selection, which prompted Lynn to comment, "[The title's curation status] says a lot; Bouchra isn't chasing the traditional prestige or red-carpet slot but instead combines experimentation and hybridity with the deeply personal." Bennani's 34-minute science-fiction video trilogy, Life on the CAPS, had previously appeared in both venues' 2022 editions. (Note: CAPS played alongside 2 Lizards at Toronto's Power Plant gallery, and as part of New York's Current Shorts lineup (Program 5: "After Utopia").)

Bouchra was also screened at the Chicago International Film Festival on 16 October, and at Montreal's Cinemania in early November. Its European showings resumed on 10 October at the Bordeaux International Independent Film Festival (FIFIB). During its tenure in France, it would also play at La Roche-sur-Yon shortly afterward, along with Chéries-Chéris and Entrevues Belfort in mid-November. The film returned to Italy as part of the Panorama Italia (Premio del Pubblico) lineup in Rome's Alice nella città on 19 October, and at Florence's Schermo dell'arte on 15 November. By the time of its first anniversary, it was an Alquimias selection at Valladolid's Seminci in Spain on 29 October, and appeared in Thessaloniki's "Plot Twist: Beyond the Sixth Sense" program in Greece two days afterward. In Belgium, the 25th edition of Brussels' CinemaMed hosted it in late November as part of its "RêVolution" lineup. Through its 1 December showing, Bouchra became one of the first three Italian selections at the Singapore International Film Festival (alongside La grazia and Waking Hours). It also appeared at the Glasgow Film Festival on 26–27 February 2026.

At Toronto, Bennani pointed out the increasing challenges of submitting animated films into festivals, (Note: Mohan 2025: "Coming from the art world, that must be a frustrating realization for Bennani.") and expressed hope that viewers in her native Morocco would get a chance to see Bouchra. In December 2025, arthouse company Film Movement secured U.S. distribution rights; a theatrical run in that market began on 26 June 2026 at New York City's Metrograph. This came after various outlets advocated a public launch (FlickSided, Les Inrockuptibles and Cahiers du Cinéma) and speculated on its chances at a Best Animated Feature Oscar nomination. (Note: Birnam 2025: "Its festival-circuit intimacy and avant-garde sensibility make it more of a critical darling than a mainstream contender.") By February 2026, Norte Distribution secured the rights for a 3 June release in France.

== Reception ==
=== Critical analysis ===
As of July 2026, Bouchra carries a 75% score (with a weighted average of 7.2/10) on review aggregator Rotten Tomatoes, based on 12 reviews. On Metacritic, it received a Metascore of 64 (indicating "generally favourable reviews") based on seven reviews.

==== Milan run ====
"...the power of works such as For Aicha lies in the way this special intensity conveys colors of emotion and revelatory moments of intimacy less seen, including queer and other styles and affects, and alternative rhythms of the everyday. In so doing, [creators Bennani and Barki] imagine a curious kind of realism in which communion is more possible, and in so making, the artists create their own suspended moments of social utopia."

— Laura McLean-Ferris, concluding her review of the film's original Milan release

Several publications reviewed For Aicha during its original Milan screenings. CURA.'s Lumi Tan commented on the effectiveness of the emotional expressions Bennani sought in her characters, while adding that "its long narrative format lends time for further character development and narrative agility". Laura McLean-Ferris of Mousse, another Italian art magazine, wrote that Sole Crushing "gains even more nuance from its pairing with" the companion feature. "In some ways," she said, "[it] doesn't exactly feel like art. I mean this in a positive sense, in that it doesn't seem like anything else, in way that, say, the works of Ryan Trecartin and Lizzie Fitch, who have also shown at [the Fondazione Prada], didn't either, the first time I saw them. It feels like the fully realized and original expression of a group, its shared visions and sensibilities." Billie Muraben of Canvas Online found the storyline "confusing" to follow on the first watch, but "a true representation of difficult conversations with people we love" on the second. The staff of Gilt Magazine said on its opening day, "If you are passionate about contemporary art or simply curious, [the parent exhibition] offers a must-see opportunity to explore the new boundaries of art and visual storytelling."

Near the end of its Prada tenure in January 2025, Jace Clayton said, "For all the mixed-media wizardry and zoomorphic verve, For Aicha is a tender story of familial reconciliation." A month later, Bonsi remarked: "[B]etween moments of raw emotion and liberating joy [emerges] a narrative that is deeply human despite its animated form. This interplay of movement, everyday reality, and experimental visual storytelling—amplified by the presence of anthropomorphized animal characters—creates a crescendo of emotion while simultaneously fostering a sense of possibility and connection."

==== Festival run ====
"The animation [in Bouchra] isn't just a stylistic choice; it's the film's beating heart, helping to give it its identity in a landscape where many animated titles can feel overly similar in tone, design, and feel....[and serves as] a psychological device rather than a visual gimmick. Bouchra's coyote form becomes a metaphor for self-representation, a way to reconcile queerness, diaspora, and creative expression in ways live action alone could not."

— J Don Birnam (October 2025)

Through its North American festival run, the retitled Bouchra was screened to positive reviews, and gained popularity with the furry userbase of online film database Letterboxd. Enthusiasm for the film was reported by FlickSided during its Toronto showings, and by French newspaper Le Monde some time later.

On its North American premiere, Lawrence Garcia called Bouchra an "unusual, surprising, and often moving debut feature", with "dialogue [that is] often entertaining and witty [and] interactions [that] are convincingly naturalistic." Monita Ray Mohan found it "wistful and charming", further writing that "Watching this film is an immersive and breathtaking experience.... It's wonderful to see such a touching and hopeful queer story centering characters from other backgrounds." Minority Review gave it a 4/5 grade, remarking that it was simultaneously "subtle yet stark," and "is every bit worth the watch for both the storyline and the way the artistic vision has been carried out from a cinematic point of view." In their 3/5 review, Ontario campus-radio station CFMU's Animation in Motion praised the "beautiful" design but criticised the motion-captured movement and the fast pace of the subtitles, adding that the behind-the-scenes story was as interesting as the film itself.

Around the time of its New York premiere, Jason Bailey of Crooked Marquee deemed it "a frankly thrilling experiment" despite its familiar plot. Lynn awarded it 3 1/2 stars out of five, writing: "One of the most intimate and political animations of the year... [Bouchra] insists on new forms and a new cinematic language." Giving it 7/10, Next Best Picture's John Bayer predicted it would become a classic of LGBTQ+ cinema, and felt that the voice cast's "genuine, honest" performances compensated for its stilted CGI and uncanny valley effect. Upon its Chicago screenings, Nicki Ni of Cine-File wrote, "Barki and Bennani excel at constructing an absorbing story that so effortlessly conveys many things at once.... It's also a medium-conscious film that's rich in social commentary." Jeanne Boisteault of French university outlet #HASHTAG INFOS called it "an absolutely poignant work of art", adding that Berger's music "creates an atmosphere that takes us on a journey through countries and cultures." In a survey of animated highlights from Toronto 2025, Faní Emmanouíl of Greek site Exostis said that asking about the titular character existentially, rather than answering, made the film enjoyable. Isabel Lutz, who attended its mid-November 2025 showing at Vienna's Queertactics, called it "a sincere and very personal story" recommended for furry audiences. According to Ariel Schweitzer of Cahiers, Bouchra was part of 2025's originality-driven Nouvelle Vagues lineup at La Roche-sur-Yon.

Reviewing Bouchra in March 2026 after its Glasgow screenings, Film Carnage rated it a 7/10, commenting on the rushed pace of the scenes while also writing, "It has a very big heart and a meaningful story to tell but overall, it's not as strong as it could have been." The film received 4 out of 5 stars in a Guardian review.

==== Art style and narrative ====
Various reviews highlighted Bouchra's animation style, with a few likening it to the aesthetic associated with early to mid-2000s video games; many of the same stylistic elements from 2020's 2 Lizards resurface in the feature follow-up. In his positive review from Toronto, Cineuropa contributor David Katz said, "Bouchra isn't quite revolutionary enough to feel 'new', but everything about it is made with such intelligence and rigour, persuading us that PlayStation 2 graphics and autofiction actually do belong together." Jamie Lang of Cartoon Brew wrote that its characters are "not rendered in a cartoony style, nor pushed toward photorealism, but designed with a grounded, textural realism that gives the world an authentic presence that feels immediately identifiable to anyone who has lived in a metropolitan city. That visual approach, paired with the intimacy of the story, sets Bouchra apart from much of today's CGI animated fare." Louis Skye of FlickSided shared a similar view while commending the team's work and their ability to deliver under their deadline. Mohan described the film as "a Lego creation of video, photography, hand art, and 3D" that would pass off as a live-action work if not for the animal characters. Boisteault praised the originality in Bennani and Barki's combination of techniques, while Neulichedl wrote that the aesthetic comes alive through Bouchra's drawings. Julio Torres of New York's Vulture commended Bennani's "exciting" yet unconventional blend of live-action and animation techniques, while Lutz said that the "imaginative and visually impressive" style "gives the work a special, multi-layered atmosphere." Film Carnage said, "[Bennani and Barki's style] is either going to work for you or it's not."

Among Milan-era reviewers, Tan wrote that "Bennani and Barki's collaboration with creative producers and animators John Michael Boling and Jason Coombs achieves an astounding level of visual detail." Another two noted the "playful visual moments" in Bennani's work, which was also "characterized by a delicate touch". Annalise Kamegawa of culture magazine NR said at the time, "In this blend of cinematic styles—documentary, traditional filmmaking, animation—a layered, experimental work emerges."

Reviewers also observed the story's juxtaposition of reality and filmed fiction, (Note: Attributed to multiple sources: Tozzi 2024, McLean-Ferris 2024, Kirszenbaum 2025, Bailey 2025, Lynn 2025, and Lutz 2025.) which "makes the movie stand out" in Bailey's view, as well as its "stunning and unexpected shots"; neo-noir palette; and cyberpunk aesthetic. Several noted the differences in lighting, character wardrobe, and weather (Note: The New York scenes are rain-soaked, while those in Morocco are sunlit (Bonsi 2025; Ni 2025).) between the New York and Casablanca scenes. A few also discussed its realism, Lynn among them:

"Characters don't always speak like native speakers, but they always come across as true, with pauses, hesitations, blunt statements, and even banality. Bennani herself has said she couldn't always tell whether a scene was fascinating or boring, and that feels exactly right; some viewers will vibe with the film's rhythm, others may find it banal. But those who settle into its cadence will find it touching, political, and deeply sincere."

Some of them, however, found the film's metafictional structure difficult to follow and potentially challenging to viewers. As Peng wrote, "It is often unclear whether the storyboards reveal Bouchra's memories, of if they expand into episodes of a film Bouchra has already made." Emmanouíl added that the fourth wall gets broken "in a way that reshapes what came before, and reveals that [Bouchra's supposed] memoir is actually something more unsettling."

=== Accolades ===
Bouchra was the first animated work nominated for Toronto's Platform Prize, whose tenth-anniversary award ultimately went to Ukraine's live-action To the Victory! by Valentyn Vasyanovych. It also received the Gold Q-Hugo in Chicago's OutLook program, which showcases material catering to LGBTQ+ audiences; the festival's jury said in their citation, "In a year that highlights genre, this film boldly defies it....[and] is a genre all its own." In France, it won the Grand Prix in Bordeaux's international feature-film competition; La Roche-sur-Yon's "Nouvelles vagues" prize; the Prix du Jury at Chéries-Chéris; and the Ciné+ OCS Distribution Support Prize at Entrevues Belfort. It also received a "Mention du Jury Jeune" at CinemaMed, and the 2026 Ingmar Bergman Debut Award at Sweden's Gothenburg Festival.

== See also ==
- List of Moroccan films
- List of animated feature films of 2024
- List of LGBTQ-related films of 2024
- List of animated films with LGBTQ characters
- List of LGBTQ-related films directed by women
- List of films featuring fictional films

== Bibliography ==
- Bennani, Meriem; Barki, Orian (2024). Mainetti, Mario; Gravina, Niccolò (eds.). For My Best Family: For Aicha / Sole Crushing (in English and Italian). Milan: Fondazione Prada. ISBN 978-88-87029-92-5.
