= Chess photography =

The earliest surviving photograph depicting chess is most often credited to William Henry Fox Talbot, and consists of a portrait of two players seated at a chess board. There is still considerable debate as to who should be credited with the image. Titled Chess Players, the photo was published in Nicolaas Henneman's 1847 collection Talbotypes or Sun Pictures. One of the players, Antoine Claudet, was a known friend of Talbot. However, the identity of his opponent, initialed "M", is still unknown.

Among those photographed during the early development of film photography was Emanuel Lasker, World Chess Champion from 1894 to 1921. Most early chess photography took place in New York, which had developed into a hub for chess hustlers, enthusiasts, and professionals over the twentieth century. Famous photographer Stanley Kubrick played chess at Washington Square Park, which served as a filming site for multiple chess movies filmed in the late 20th century.

In 1972, Bobby Fischer played in the World Chess Championship, representing the US, facing Boris Spassky of the USSR in Reykjavik. The match was broadcast worldwide, and the stakes were high given cultural, social, and political tension between the USSR and USA. Fischer invited Harry Benson, a photographer, and Brad Darrasch, a reporter from LIFE magazine, to watch him prepare. Harry Benson went on to become a close friend of Fischer, one of the only people in the world to do so.

The 1997 match between Garry Kasparov and Deep Blue provoked many questions on chess and how it should continue to develop, and was widely covered and photographed. The photos taken on-site varied drastically between the first and second match, as Kasparov won the first and lost the second to Deep Blue. Arguably the most famous chess images of all time were taken during the rematch, Game 6. Among others, photojournalist Stan Honda and photographers from Reuters took photos depicting Kasparov's blunder in Game 6, and the pictures of the emotional loss Kasparov experiences after realizing his blunder are yet to be matched in popularity in internet usage and distribution.

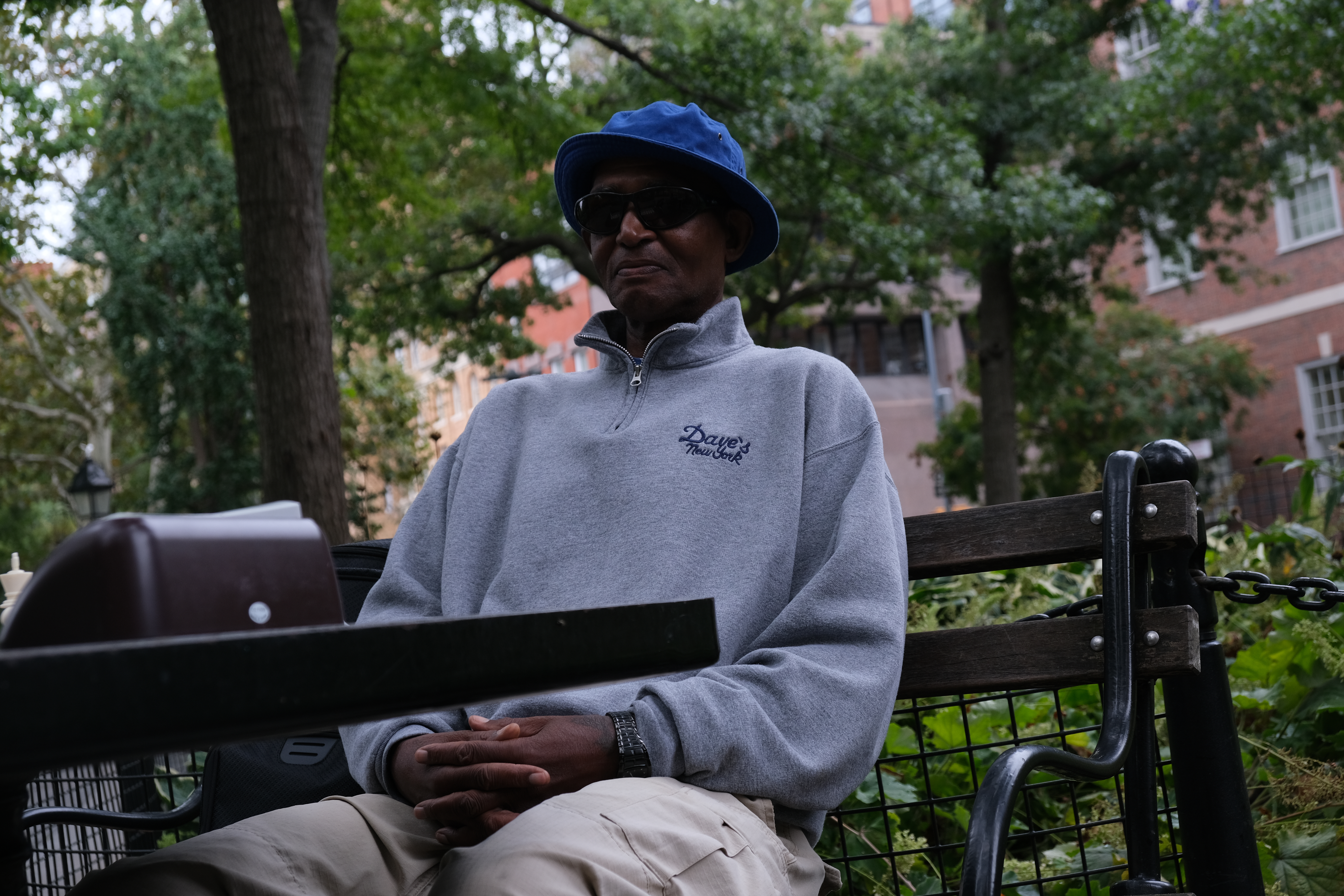
Duke, a chess hustler, sits at his table in Washington Square Park.

== Notable figures ==
- Stan Honda, a photojournalist, captured the crucial moment Kasparov realized he blundered to Deep blue in 1997.
- Harry Benson, famous for celebrity photography, took many of the remaining photographs of Bobby Fischer.
- Michael Hanke placed high in multiple photography contests, like the 2017 World Press Photo contest, for his work in chess photography.
- Lennart Ootes won 2018 Chess Photographer of the Year from the Russian Chess Federation, and has been in chess photography for over a decade.
