= 2 Lizards =

2020 adult computer-animated web series

- Genre: Adult animation (Note: Eckardt 2024: "Throughout the series, we see the animated creatures experience having to move back home after a job loss, reveling in the thrill of a sexual encounter after going so long with physical touch, and feeling like they’ve dreamt showing up to work without pants on the first time they forgot their mask. (Not to mention working without pants becoming a part of their daily routines.)"); Docuseries; Surrealism
- Created by: Meriem Bennani; Orian Barki
- Voices of: Meriem Bennani; Orian Barki
- Country of origin: United States
- Original language: English (open captions)
- No. of episodes: 8

Production
- Running time: 1–5 minutes

Original release
- Network: Instagram Live
- Release: 17 March – 5 July 2020

Related
- Bouchra

2 Lizards is a 2020 American adult computer-animated short-form web series created by Meriem Bennani and Orian Barki. The duo voices unnamed lizard versions of themselves, who navigate their way through the COVID-19 crisis in a New York City populated by anthropomorphic animal characters. During the first week of lockdowns in their home borough of Brooklyn (where the series takes place), Bennani and Barki started working on 2 Lizards as a way to cope. Friends of theirs contributed their own music and improvised dialogue to the episodes; storylines were also based on news reports at the time of production. The series utilised live-action backgrounds of the city shot on iPhones, with each installment taking 2–7 days to make.

2 Lizards ran from 17 March to 5 July 2020; eight episodes were streamed on co-creator Bennani's Instagram channel. A viral hit, it received positive acclaim during and after its original run, and was showcased on Adult Swim's Off the Air anthology program. In 2021, a compilation re-edit was inducted into the collections of two New York art institutions, one of whose curators championed the series. In later years, it was cited as one of the earliest works to address the pandemic. Bennani and Barki revisited 2 Lizards' universe in their 2024 feature debut, For Aicha (later retitled Bouchra for festival release).

== Synopsis ==
Bennani: "I mean, to be honest, I'm kind of into this confinement thing because I feel like I've been fantasizing about not having any plans and just having to stay home and do things I never have time to do. So in a fucked up way, I'm loving this."

Barki: "That's such a quarantine week one thing to say."

— Opening dialogue from the first episode, in which the creators' lizard characters relax on a rooftop

A "surrealist diary" of its release period, 2 Lizards is set in a version of Brooklyn, New York City, populated by anthropomorphic animals. Creators Meriem Bennani and Orian Barki voice unnamed lizard versions of themselves, both of whom discuss and deal with life and quarantines during the first few months of the COVID-19 pandemic. As the series progresses, the lizards become more aware of the environment around them. "In the second [episode]," writes Jon Caramanica of The New York Times, "they're on the street; in the third, the news of the outside world reaches them; and in the fourth, they learn about the suffering taking place all around them." The series runs on a freeform basis in favour of a traditional narrative arc, beginning—and ending—on the same Brooklyn rooftop.

== Voice cast ==
- Meriem Bennani and Orian Barki as the lizards. Bennani has green scales and a "girlish and urbane" accent, while brown-coloured Barki "is sensuously low-voiced, with an Israeli accent".
- Anthony Fauci as himself (through archive news footage). Appears as a snake in the third episode.
- Cady Chaplin as a nurse cat in the fourth episode. Chaplin worked at Manhattan's Lenox Hill Hospital at the time of release.
- Ariana Faye Allensworth as an impala, and Diamond Stingily as an ostrich. In the seventh episode, they both discuss workplace diversity after the George Floyd incident.
- Kyunghee Jwa as a raccoon immigrant in the eighth episode. Unable to pay her rent, she moves back to her native South Korea.
- Becky Akinyode as a leopard, one of whose lines "echo[es] the reverberating sense of physical isolation that has characterized this age of lockdown."

== Production ==
2 Lizards was created by Bennani and Barki, who respectively hailed from Morocco and Israel. It is Bennani's first project set and produced in the United States, as opposed to her native country for earlier works. The titular characters originated on the crowdsourcing 3D-model site, TurboSquid, as a singular asset that user Mathieu Riedinger (under the pseudonym "Tam4tik") originally created for game use; Bennani had previously purchased it for use in another project. Barki, at the time, had more experience in the live-action documentary field than animation.

The creators made the first installment in their Brooklyn apartments as a means of coping with the first week of COVID-19 lockdowns, and also as a way to procrastinate and find relief in the production process. Running 86 seconds in length, it was based on a conversation between the creators shortly before its making, an approach that would carry over to the next seven. News stories at the time of production influenced the duo's "mood of the week", while various episodes were inspired by Taxi Driver, Manhattan, and Vanilla Sky. According to a W Magazine story, "The pair invited their friends to choose animals to represent them and send voice memos of improvised lines whenever inspiration struck." Apart from the seventh episode, the storylines were based on "the personal experiences of those around them."

Bennani preferred to work "unglorious" species, such as flies, donkeys, and crocodiles, into her plots. She and Barki spent two days making the first installment, and one week for the finale. The low activity level in New York City at the time gave them the opportunity to capture the scenery as live-action backgrounds on their iPhones.

The few lines spoken in 2 Lizards' premiere "quickly establish the characters as worldly New Yorkers-from-elsewhere who regard their adopted city with side-eyed affection. The city seems to glitter under their gaze." The duo scored the shorts to musical contributions from friends of theirs: COQUETA, Flavien Berger, Asma Maroof, Sienna Fekete and Color Plus, and Morris. At the end of the first episode, their characters dance to Miles Davis' 1954 performance of "It Never Entered My Mind" atop a Brooklyn building, along with three other animal residents. The series' soundtrack, per Charlene K. Lau of The Brooklyn Rail, "oscillates between hope and uncertainty".

== Themes ==
"Animated animals" like the cast of 2 Lizards, said Lau, "have never felt so real, their classification a curious stand-in for our own differences. In this way, their virus-laden world is also ours (but cuter) and provides a great comfort against a backdrop of strangely desolate scenes and our worry-addled brains." In a January 2022 essay for the Visual Resources journal, Hilde Nelson stated that "2 Lizards affirms the ways in which the digital and the material are intertwined and interdependent, a state only strengthened in an age of pandemic and cyber-life. In this sense, Bennani and Barki exploit the potential of heterotopic space, a quotidian fantasy in which to escape, cope, and reckon." Later installments of the series touch on racial discrimination and the Black Lives Matter movement, with a news-anchor mouse reporting on the latter's proceedings in the seventh episode.

== Release ==
Bennani and Barki targeted 2 Lizards towards the mobile-device demographic, formatting their work for sideways viewing. They released the first episode on Bennani's Instagram feed on 17 March 2020; its viral popularity surprised the creators, and encouraged them to create another seven installments until 5 July. By early April, they were even receiving viewer requests for musical and guest spots in future episodes. The second episode was featured in "Dreams", a tenth-season installment of Adult Swim's Off the Air anthology program.

Re-edited as a single 22-minute compilation short, the series was inducted into the permanent collection of New York's Whitney Museum of American Art in late 2021, a decision which "made perfect sense" to Barki on account of its "historical and archival value". During that same period, it was also picked up by the Museum of Modern Art. Between September 2022 and February 2023, a trail of lizard footprints guided visitors to Whitney's exhibit.

== Reception ==
For their work on the series, Jon Caramanica dubbed Bennani and Barki as "coronavirus art stars" in an April 2020 New York Times story. "Part of the effectiveness [of the four episodes thus far]," he said, "owes to how they're rooted in actual circumstance but rendered with fancy and wit. In a moment when fact can be elusive, or harsh — what's unassailable, and needs no translation, is feeling." Whitney Museum curator Rujeko Hockley championed the shorts as "the most on-the-nose, accurate, what it feels like to be in New York City during this quarantine period" account at the time. (Note: The creators accepted a chance to be interviewed for Caramanica's story to maintain their American visas.) Another Times reporter, Sasha Weiss, said in 2021: "Watching 2 Lizards a year and a half after it debuted, I'm struck by how much it has to tell us, and how pithily and lightly it does so. It feels definitive — perhaps the canonical artwork about a very bad year....[and] has something devastating to say. But at the same time, it has the appeal of a cartoon."

Halfway through its original run, Sarah Ben Romdane of lifestyle site Mille World said, "2 Lizards delightfully encapsulates the daily lives of two ordinary individuals navigating the anxiety of self-isolation... It doesn't matter if they're computer-generated; the creatures are brutally genuine." By the time six episodes had been reached, Simon Wu of BOMB Magazine wrote, "I was drawn to the way that the lizards move. Each episode is a bit of quarantine choreography."

Nelson retrospectively noted in January 2022, "To its viewers...the series offers the kindness of recognition, creating a forum in which the lizards are compatriots and co-conspirators with their audiences in their shared claustrophobia and exuberance, anxiety and joy." She also observed the creators' and their partners' ability to assume animal identities in the wake of a pandemic-ridden cityscape. In September 2023, Osman Can Yerebakan of The Art Newspaper remarked that "the videos' relatable tone has found a much wider audience than Bennani and Barki might originally have expected."

Artsy reported that the first episode earned more than 68,000 views and over 400 comments by April 2020, a harbinger of the series' "devoted following"; this figure grew to almost 200,000 by the end of 2021. Laura McLean-Ferris of Italian art magazine Mousse praised its animation and voice work, while Yerebakan found that its plot typified the "joy of missing out" (JOMO) effect. Episode seven garnered close to 108,000 views by the start of 2022.

== Legacy ==
2 Lizards was later seen as one of the earliest examples of art addressing the COVID-19 crisis. Bennani and Barki's previous production experience "helped them capture the emotional nuances [of] 2020's lockdowns," wrote Yerebakan. "Infused with hints of what was deemed as a 'new normal' at the time, the sequences contemplate the urban realities of a global emergency while the leads fill in the parts of both the voice of reason and the Greek chorus: they contradict and agree with one another in ways that will be familiar to many viewers."

In a 2020 Filmmaker Magazine article, Barki stated that 2 Lizards is unlikely to return; Bennani, however, added that the methods they used would be kept around for future projects. Amid the series' high popularity, its end coincided with New York's post-onset rebound. Barki told W Magazine a few years later, "It was just very spontaneous. It wasn't symbolic. If we tried to make something similar now, we already have too much perspective."

The series would later lend its name to the duo's production company; their 2024 directorial debut, For Aicha, takes place in its universe. The first animated feature produced in Morocco, 2 Lizards' For Aicha features a blend of documentary and fiction elements similar to what the 2020 series employed; in both works, Bennani's character talks to her mother by phone. Composer Berger returned for this follow-up, as did voice actors Allensworth and Akinyode, and Barki's lizard character (now named Yani). It was originally commissioned by the Fondazione Prada as part of an art exhibit at their home facility in Milan. In September 2025, the film returned on the festival circuit under a new name, Bouchra.

== See also ==
- Love in the Time of Corona, a Freeform series
- Impact of the COVID-19 pandemic on social media
- COVID-19 pandemic in New York City
