= Meriem Bennani =

Moroccan 3D animation and video artist based in New York (born 1988)

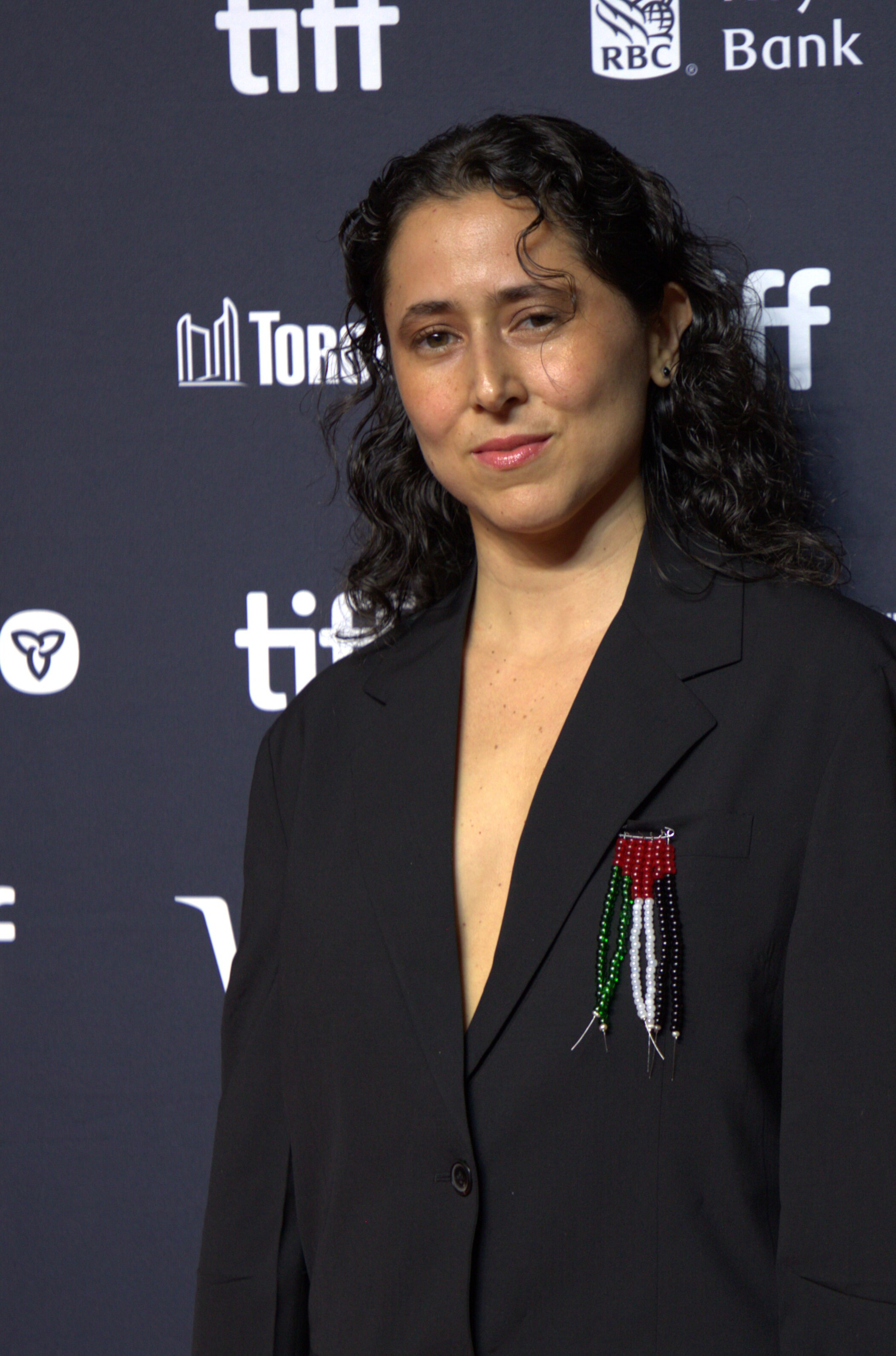
- Bennani in 2025 at TIFF.
- Born: 1988 (age 37–38); Rabat, Morocco
- Education: The Cooper Union; École Nationale Supérieure des Arts Décoratifs
- Website: http://meriembennani.com/

Meriem Bennani (born 1988) is a Moroccan artist currently based in New York City.

== Biography ==
Bennani was born and raised in Rabat, Morocco. She received her BFA from The Cooper Union in 2012 after having received her MFA in Animation from the École Nationale Supérieure des Arts Décoratifs in Paris in 2011.

== Work ==
Bennani works in video, sculpture, multimedia installation, drawing, and Instagram. She is known for her playful and humorous use of digital technologies such as 3D animation, projection mapping, and motion capture. She often publishes her work on social media such as Instagram and Snapchat.

Bennani was one of the four artists featured in the 2019 Whitney Biennial who formally requested that their work be removed via a collective letter which was also published on Artforum.

She was the winner of the 2019 Eye Art & Film Prize

The collections of Guggenheim Museum New York, USA; Kadist Foundation, Paris, France; and Musée d’Art Moderne de la Ville de Paris, Paris, France has held Bennanni's work.

=== Gradual Kingdom ===
Bennani's exhibition, Gradual Kingdom, which was featured at SIGNAL gallery in 2015, incorporated video, drawing and sculpture. This exhibit addresses the relationship between her hometown, Rabat, Morocco, and global networks of exchange. Bennani incorporates sand into her sculptural installation to highlight the extraction of sand from her home region to build artificial islands in the Middle East and to replenish eroding luxury beaches.

=== Siham and Hafida ===
Bennani's 2017 exhibition Siham and Hafida was a multi-channel video installation at The Kitchen in which Benanni explores the generational conflict between two Moroccan chikha singers, combining the artist's own footage with digital manipulations and animations.

=== Fly ===
Bennani's 2016 video installation FLY at MoMA PS1 featured a layered choreography of projections which evoked the kaleidoscopic eye of the titular animal. An animated fly acts as a diegetic guide through footage shot in Bennani's hometown of Rabat, Morocco. The fly moves us through fragmented scenes of markets, a wedding, and interviews with relatives, stopping occasionally to sing a distorted version of Rihanna's “Kiss It Better.”

=== Fardaous Funjab ===
Fardaous Funjab is an itinerant fake reality TV show centered around a fictitious hijab designer who creates campy and absurdist designs such as a hijab made of a tennis ball basket or a multi-tiered wedding cake. The project explores the cultural significance of the headscarf, selecting events and holidays that pay homage to both Muslim and American cultures as inspiration for her hijab designs.

=== 2 Lizards ===
In 2020, Bennani collaborated with Israeli artist Orian Barki on a series entitled 2 Lizards. The video series has been hailed by writers and curators as a preeminent document of life under quarantine. The subject of the series is life in New York City during the COVID-19 pandemic. The 8 short videos are now in the collection of the Museum of Modern Art and the Whitney Museum of American Art.

=== For My Best Family ===
Bennani would later create For My Best Family, a 2024–25 exhibition commissioned by the Milan host facility, Fondazione Prada. Developed over a two-year period, it comprised two interconnected components on different levels of the Prada: a mechanical installation named Sole Crushing, and a computer-animated feature titled For Aicha. Sole Crushing was made in collaboration with musician Reda Senhaji (performing as Cheb Runner), and For Aicha with Barki. The first animated feature produced in Morocco, Aicha owed its setting and production-company name to 2 Lizards, and was Bennani and Barki's directorial debut; a re-edited version entered festival release as Bouchra in September 2025.

== Reception ==
Sasha Weiss of The New York Times Magazine wrote in 2021, "Bennani's work combines the frenetic surrealism of a Ryan Trecartin video, the argot of memes, Hollywood special effects and hand-held smartphone cinematography."
