= List of animated television series of 2024 =

This is a list of animated television series that aired in 2024.

Title	Seasons	Episodes	Country	Year	Original channel	Technique
1001 Mondes Antiques	1	13	France	2024	France 4	Flash
The 3 Musketeers	1	52	France	2024–present	Okoo	CGI
Alex Player	1	26	France	2024–present	France 4	Flash
Alice's Diary	1	52	Portugal	2024–present	RTP2, Disney Jr.	Flash
Agent 203	1	26	Germany, Italy, North Macedonia	2024	Super RTL	CGI
Angry Birds Mystery Island	1	24	United States	2024	Amazon Prime Video	Flash
Ariel	2	55	United States	2024–present	Disney Jr.	CGI
Ark: The Animated Series	1	13	United States	2024–present	Paramount+	Traditional
Astronauta	1	6	Brazil	2024	HBO	Flash
Audrey's Shelter	1	52	Canada, Spain	2024–present	TVOKids	Flash
Baahubali: Crown of Blood	1	9	India	2024	Disney+ Hotstar	
Bad Dinosaurs	1	8	United States	2024	Netflix	CGI
Barney's World	1	40	United States	2024–present	Cartoonito	CGI
Batman: Caped Crusader	1	10	United States	2024–present	Amazon Prime Video	Traditional
Beast Boy: Lone Wolf	1	10	United Kingdom	2024	Cartoon Network	Flash
BIg Lizard	1	52	United Kingdom	2024	CBeebies	CGI
Bujji and Bhairava	1	2	India	2024	Amazon Prime Video	CGI
Caillou (2024)	1	26	Canada	2024–present	Peacock	CGI
Camp Snoopy	1	13	United States	2024–present	Apple TV+	Flash/Traditional
Carl the Collector	1	23	Canada, United States	2024–present	PBS Kids	Flash
Chhota Startup			India	2024	Hungama	
Chums	3	36	Canada	2024–present	APTN	CGI
Coco Boo	1	10	Canada	2024	TVOKids	Flash
Creature Commandos	1	7	United States	2024–present	Max	Traditional
Dee & Friends in Oz	2	17	United States	2024	Netflix	CGI
Dora (2024)	4	104	Canada, United States	2024–present	Nickelodeon / Paramount+	CGI
Dream Productions	1	4	United States	2024	Disney+	CGI
Dylan's Playtime Adventures	1	52	Canada	2024–present	CBC Kids	CGI
Eddie's Lil' Homies	1	10	Australia	2024	NITV	CGI
Exploding Kittens	1	9	United States	2024	Netflix	Flash
Everybody Still Hates Chris	1	10	United States	2024–present	Comedy Central	Flash
The Fairly OddParents: A New Wish	1	20	United States	2024	Nickelodeon	CGI
Good Times: Black Again	1	10	United States	2024	Netflix	Flash
Grimsburg	3	29	United States	2024–present	Fox	Flash
Hamsters of Hamsterdale	1	26	Canada	2024	Nickelodeon	Flash
Hop	1	26	Canada	2024–present	Max	Flash
Hot Wheels Let's Race	3	20	United States	2024–2025	Netflix	CGI
In the Know	1	6	United States	2024–present	Peacock	Stop-Motion
Invincible Fight Girl	1	10	United States	2024	Adult Swim	Traditional
Iwájú	1	6	United States	2024	Disney+	CGI
Jay Jagannath			India	2024	Pogo	
Jentry Chau vs. the Underworld	1	13	United States	2024	Netflix	Traditional
Jurassic World: Chaos Theory	3	30	United States	2024–present	Netflix	CGI
Kindergarten: The Musical	1	25	United States	2024–25	Disney Jr.	CGI/Flash
Kite Man: Hell Yeah!	1	10	United States	2024–present	Max	Traditional
Let's Go Bananas	2	52	Canada	2024–25	CBC Kids	Flash
Lisa & Golos	1	10	France	2024	Canal+ Kids	Flash
Lupi & Baduki	1	13	Brazil	2024	Discovery Kids	Flash
Lyla in the Loop	1	30	United States	2024–present	PBS Kids	Flash
Maddie + Triggs	1	52	Ireland	2024	RTÉjr	Flash
Masters of the Universe: Revolution	1	5	United States	2024	Netflix	Traditional
Max & the Midknights	4	40	United States	2024–26	Nickelodeon	CGI
MechWest	1	3	United States	2024–present	YouTube	CGI
Megamind Rules!	1	16	United States	2024	Peacock	CGI
Mermaid Magic	1	10	United States, Italy	2024	Netflix	CGI
Mia & Codie	2	40	Canada	2024–present	TVOKids	CGI
Mighty MonsterWheelies	1	52	United States	2024–25	Netflix	CGI
Mini Smiley	1	78	France	2024–present	Ici TOU.TV	CGI
Miniheroes of the Forest	1	52	France, Italy	2024	France 5, Rai Yoyo	CGI
Modo Challenge	1	52	France	2024	TF1	CGI
Mojo Swoptops	1	52	United Kingdom	2024	CBeebies	CGI
Monster Shaker	1	52	France	2024	Gulli	Flash
Morphle and the Magic Pets	1	52	United States	2024–2025	Disney Jr.	CGI
Mr. Birchum	1	6	United States	2024	DailyWire+	Flash
Paramigos Imparáveis	1	26	Brazil	2024	Gloobinho	Flash
Paula & Pals	2	98	Singapore	2024–26	Channel 5	CGI
Press Start!	1	6	United States, France	2024	Peacock	CGI
Primos	1	28	United States	2024–25	Disney Channel	Traditional
Ren & Stimpy	1	10	United States	2024	Comedy Central	Traditional/Toon Boom Harmony
Rick and Morty: The Anime	1	10	United States, Japan	2024	Adult Swim	Traditional
Rock Paper Scissors	3	40	United States	2024–26	Nickelodeon	Flash
Sausage Party: Foodtopia	2	16	United States	2024–present	Amazon Prime Video	CGI
Seasons of Blossom	1	12	South Korea	2024	KBS 2	Traditional
The Second Best Hospital in the Galaxy	2	16	United States	2024–present	Amazon Prime Video	Flash
Secret Level	1	15	United States	2024–present	Amazon Prime Video	CGI
Slay The Gods	2	30	China	2024–present	Tencent Video	CGI
Super Happy Magic Forest	1	52	United Kingdom	2024	CBBC	Flash
Tales of the Teenage Mutant Ninja Turtles	1	12	United States	2024–present	Paramount+	Toon Boom Harmony/Traditional
Tea Town Teddy Bears	1	26	United States	2024	Peacock	CGI
Tomb Raider: The Legend of Lara Croft	2	16	United States	2024–25	Netflix	Traditional
True Beauty	1	13	South Korea	2024	Crunchyroll	Traditional
Twilight of the Gods	1	10	United States	2024	Netflix	Traditional
Universal Basic Guys	2	25	United States	2024–present	Fox	Flash
Vovó Tatá	1	20	Brazil	2024	Gloobinho	Flash
Wonder Pets: In the City	2	26	United States	2024–26	Apple TV+	Flash
Wonderoos	2	40	Canada	2024	Netflix	CGI
WondLa	2	14	United States	2024–present	Apple TV+	CGI
Woodlings	1	26	Denmark	2024–present	DR Ramasjang	Flash
The Woohoos	1	52	United Kingdom	2024	Milkshake!	Flash
X-Men '97	2	19	United States	2024–present	Disney+	Traditional
Yukee		52	United Kingdom	2024	CBeebies	Flash
Zombies: The Re-Animated Series	1	20	United States, Canada	2024	Disney Channel	CGI

== See also ==
- 2024 in animation
- 2024 in anime
- List of animated feature films of 2024
