= Marcy Borders =

American 9/11 photograph subject (1973–2015)

- Borders covered in dust after the collapse of the World Trade Center on September 11, 2001.
- Born: July 19, 1973; Bayonne, New Jersey, U.S.
- Died: August 24, 2015 (aged 42); Paterson, New Jersey, U.S.
- Other name: Dust Lady
- Occupation: Legal assistant
- Known for: Survivor of 9/11; Subject of the "Dust Lady" photograph

Marcy Borders (July 19, 1973 – August 24, 2015) was an American legal assistant who worked for Bank of America at its branch located in the World Trade Center's North Tower and survived its collapse, following the September 11 attacks.

Stan Honda, a photographer for Agence France-Presse, captured an image of Borders, completely covered in dust from the building collapse. The image became so well known and so widely distributed that Borders became known as "The Dust Lady".

== Personal impact ==
A resident of Bayonne, New Jersey, the 28-year-old Borders had recently started a job with Bank of America as a legal assistant. She arrived at their offices on the 81st floor inside of the North Tower soon after 8:00 AM. When American Airlines Flight 11 hit the tower, her supervisor thought it might have been a small jet plane that nipped the building. The plane hit 12 stories above them, and Borders and her colleagues could feel the building shaking, and see chairs and office supplies falling out of the windows.

Borders fled down the staircase, and estimated it took her an hour to escape. By this time, the South Tower had also been hit, and had begun collapsing. The resulting dust cloud knocked Borders off her feet, and she struggled to breathe or see. A man pulled her out of the dust cloud, and dragged her into the lobby of a nearby building.

It was in this building Stan Honda captured the photo of her. Recalling the moment he said, “this woman came in completely covered in dust. It was a strange sight. She paused for a second, and I took one photo. It was just that one frame – I really only had time for that shot, then somebody took her upstairs and she was gone.” Afterwards, Borders walked to the tip of Manhattan where she made her way home on a ferry. When the photograph of her was published through AFP, her name was not included. A relative of Borders contacted the AFP office to give them her name, and Honda later visited Borders in Bayonne.

Borders told Honda she was afraid to go back to New York, and that she was frightened of tall buildings and planes. Over the years, she fell into depression. She had nightmares about Osama bin Laden, and turned to alcohol and drugs. In April 2011, she checked herself into a rehab center. A week later, the news broke about the death of Osama bin Laden. She said that news aided her in returning to sobriety, as she felt able to move on from the events of 9/11.

== Cultural impact ==
The image Honda took of Borders became famous. She was remembered in many retrospective articles about the attacks of 9/11.

== Cancer diagnosis and death ==
Borders was diagnosed with stomach cancer in August 2014. Borders's cancer had resulted in a $190,000 debt—even though she had not yet received surgery and she still needed additional chemotherapy. Borders said she could not even afford to get her prescriptions filled. She believed that her cancer was triggered by the toxic dust she was exposed to when the World Trade Center collapsed, having once stated, "I definitely believe it because I haven't had any illnesses. I don't have high blood pressure, high cholesterol, diabetes." Borders died from cancer on August 24, 2015.
