= Stan Honda =

American photojournalist

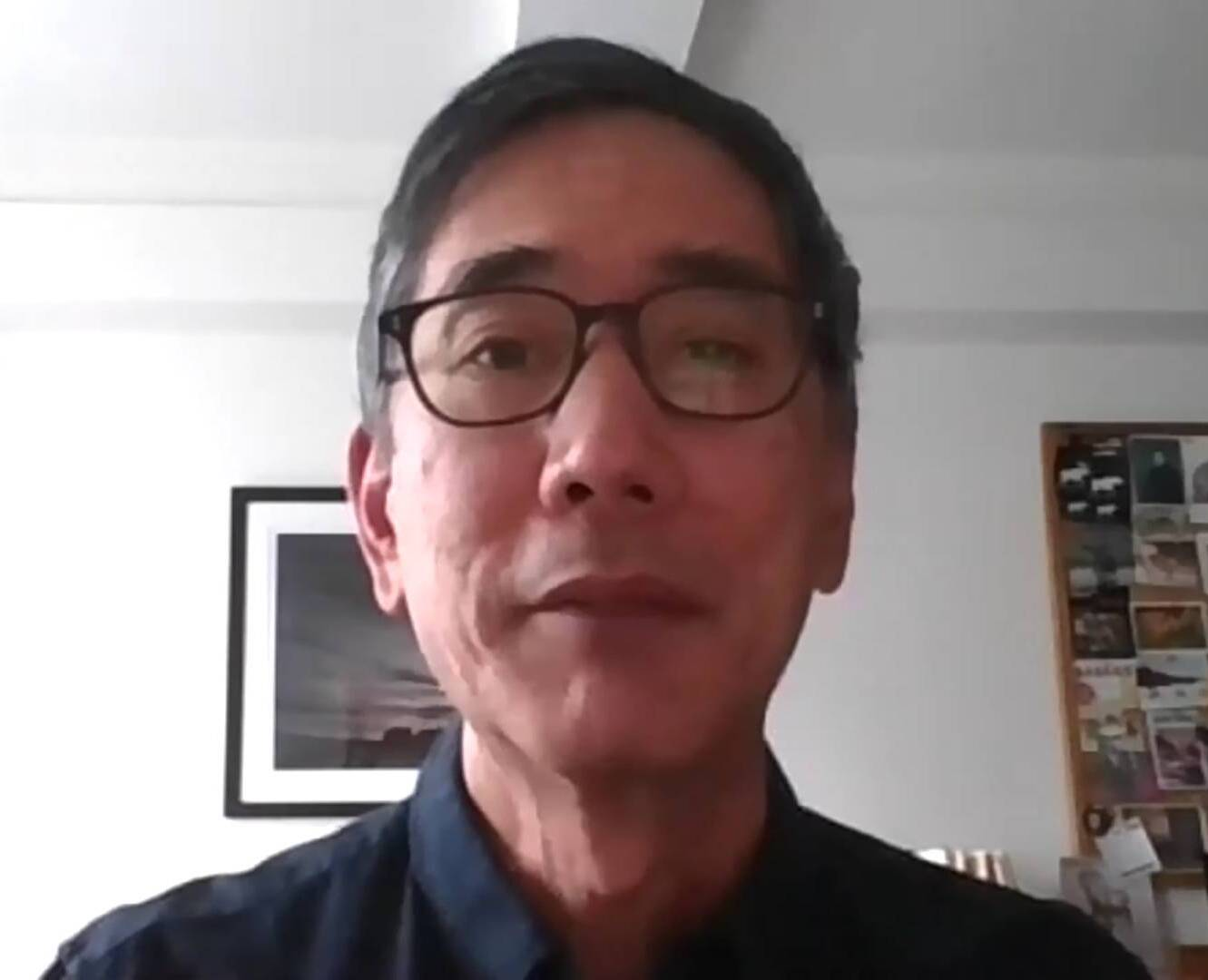
- Honda in 2020
- Occupation: Photojournalist

Stan Honda is an American photojournalist.

== Career ==
Honda's first job as a professional photojournalist, following working as a volunteer photojournalist at the campus newspaper of the University of California at San Diego, was a 1981 gig at the Daily Californian. Since then, Honda has been employed by numerous publications, including: the San Diego Union Tribune, the Los Angeles Times, New York Newsday, The National Post, and Agence France-Presse.

Honda's photo of Marcy Borders, a distressed survivor of the World Trade Center collapse, has been very widely republished.

Honda is known for capturing one of the most iconic images of the aftereffects of al Qaeda's attacks of September 11, 2001, a photo of Marcy Borders, a survivor of the collapse of the World Trade Center, completely covered in white dust. She became known as "The Dust Lady".

In 2005, the journal Visual Resources published a special issue devoted to "Photojournalism, Mass Media and the Politics of Spectacle". An interview with Honda formed an eight-page chapter of this issue of the journal. That interview focussed on Honda's photos of the after-effects on the World Trade Center attack, his photos of Japanese internment survivors, and of his photos while embedded with American soldiers during the American invasion and occupation of Iraq.

In March 2015, Honda wrote under his own byline, when he described his trip to the remote Arctic Island of Svalbard to record a rare total solar eclipse.

Honda produced a VHS narrative of a selection of some of iconic images, entitled "Eyewitness: Stan Honda - Reflections of a Photojournalist."

Honda is also an amateur astronomer; he has given lectures on photographing the night sky.
