= The Elfkins – Baking a Difference =

2020 film project

- Theatrical release poster
- German: Die Heinzels – Rückkehr der Heinzelmännchen
- Directed by: Ute von Münchow-Pohl
- Written by: Jan Strathmann
- Produced by: Dirk Beinhold
- Starring: Rivka Rothstein; Liam Mockridge; Valentin Beinhold; Suzanne Ritter; Erik Hansen; Steve Jacob; Matthew Burton; Kristen Bush
- Edited by: Ute von Münchow-Pohl; Erik Stappenbeck
- Music by: Alex Komlew
- Production company: Akkord Film Production arx anima animation studios Seru films
- Release dates: 8 October 2019 (Schlingel); 30 January 2020 (Germany)
- Running time: 75 minutes
- Country: Germany Austria
- Language: German
- Box office: $5,468,395

The Elfkins – Baking a Difference, also known as A Piece of Cake (German: Die Heinzels – Rückkehr der Heinzelmännchen) is a 2019 German animated film directed by Ute von Münchow-Pohl.

The film premiered at the 2019 SCHLINGEL International Film Festival.

The film was followed by a sequel, The Super Elfkins, released in Germany on 24 December 2024.

== Plot ==
Heinzelmännchen are helping a baker.

Synopsis:

For more than 200 years, the Elfkins have been living under ground, hiding from the upper world and avoiding any interaction with the “ungrateful and mean” human beings. But one day, the vivid Elfkin girl Helvi cannot bear the lack of space and individual fulfillment any longer. Together with two companions, the Elfkin boys Kipp and Butz, she climbs up to the earth's surface to find her fate. After hilarious adventures, Helvi's growing friendship with the initially grumpy pastry chef Theo will remind her and all the other Elfkins of their true purpose in life: helping others!

== Festivals ==
Schlingel Chemnitz 2019, Cartoon Movie 2020, Golden Sparrow Gera/Erfurt 2020, Leeds Young Film Festival 2020, Kinderfilmtage im Ruhrgebiet 2020, Filem'On Brussels CFF 2020, Chicago CFF 2020 (awarded), Giffoni CFF Winter 2020 (awarded)

== Sequel ==
A sequel, The Super Elfkins, was released in Germany on 24 December 2024.
