= The Super Elfkins =

- Directed by: Ute von Münchow-Pohl
- Written by: Jan Strathmann
- Produced by: Dirk Beinhold; Valentin Greulich
- Starring: Jella Haase; Paul Pizzera; Michael Ostrowski; Annette Frier
- Cinematography: Francesco Paglia
- Edited by: Ute von Münchow-Pohl; René Weinber
- Music by: Alex Komlew
- Production companies: ARX Anima Animation Studio; Akkord Film Produktion
- Distributed by: TOBIS Film (Germany); Constantin Film (Austria)
- Release dates: 27 September 2024 (SCHLiNGEL); 24 December 2024 (Germany & Austria)
- Running time: 76 minutes
- Countries: Germany; Austria
- Languages: German; English
- Budget: €9 million
- Box office: $2.7 million

The Super Elfkins is a 2024 animated film directed by Ute von Münchow-Pohl. The film serves as a sequel to The Elfkins – Baking a Difference.

The film premiered at SCHLiNGEL on 28 September 2024, and was released in Germany and Austria on 24 December 2024.

== Cast ==
- Jella Haase as Helvi
- Paul Pizzera as Bo
- Michael Ostrowski as Horik
- Annette Frier as Komissarin Lanski

== Production ==
Production of the film took place from December 2022 to November 2023. The film was completed by Autumn 2024. The film's budget was €9 million.

== Release ==
The Super Elfkins premiered at the SCHLiNGEL on 28 September 2024, and was released in Germany and Austria on 24 December.
