= Visual Resources =

- Discipline: Visual art
- Language: English

Publication details
- History: 1980–present
- Publisher: Routledge
- Frequency: Quarterly

Standard abbreviations
- ISO 4: Vis. Resour.

Indexing
- CODEN: VRVRDZ
- ISSN: 0197-3762 (print); 1477-2809 (web)
- OCLC no.: 06017386

Links
- Journal homepage

Visual Resources is a quarterly peer-reviewed academic journal covering art theory, digital art history, and art historiography published by Routledge. It was established in 1980 and the editor-in-chief is Barbara Pezzini (University of Manchester).

== Abstracting and indexing ==
The journal is abstracted and indexed in Bibliography of the History of Art, British Humanities Index, EBSCO databases, and Scopus.
