= Fondazione Prada =

Italian museum

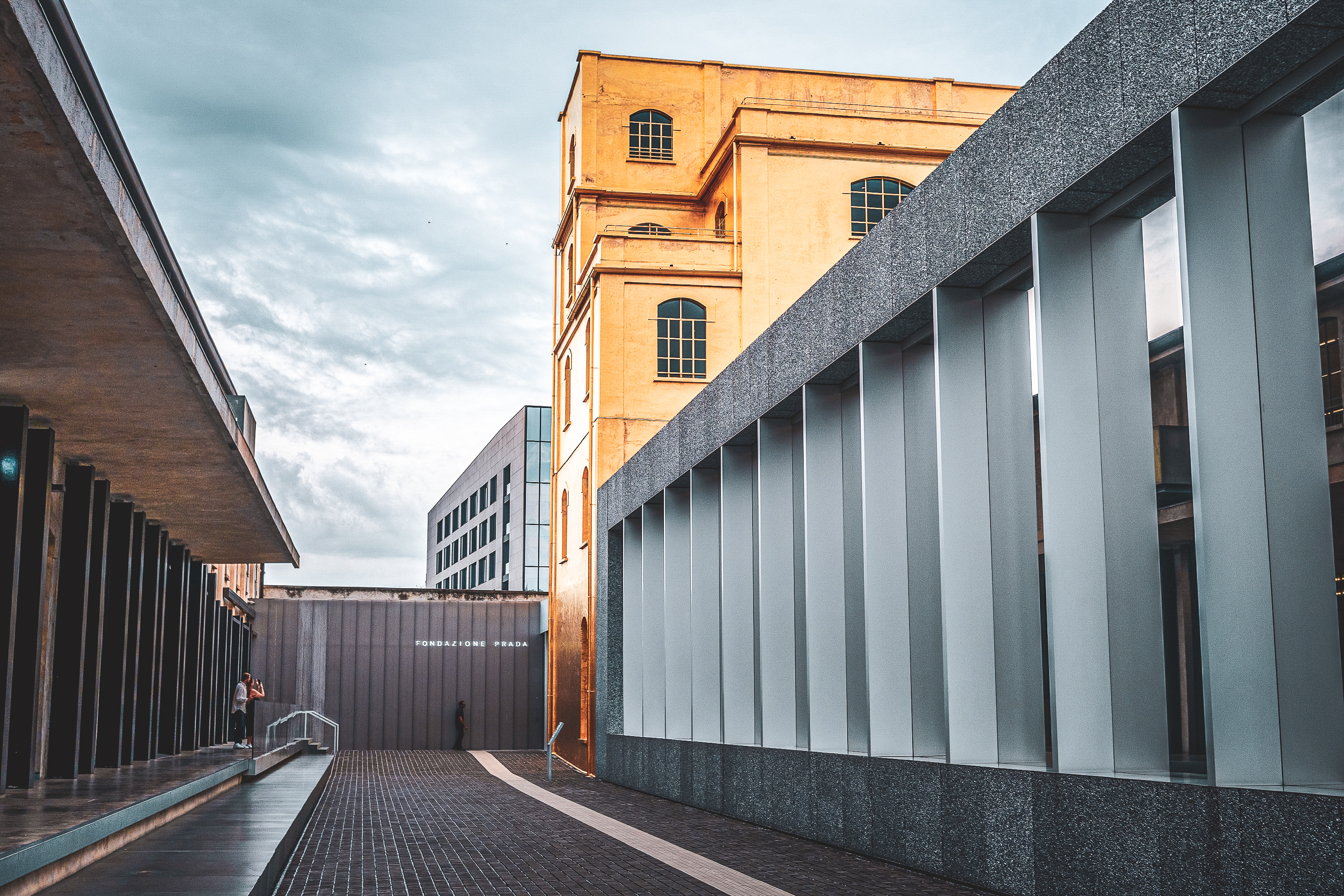
Fondazione Prada in Milan (2015)

Fondazione Prada, co-chaired by Miuccia Prada and Patrizio Bertelli since 1995, is an institution dedicated to contemporary art and culture. From 1993 to 2010, the Fondazione has organised 24 solo shows at its exhibition spaces in Milan, conceived as dialogues with acclaimed contemporary artists. In 2015, the Fondazione Prada opened a new, permanent facility in Milan.

== History ==
In the past 20 years, it has also promoted a rich cultural programme, such as film festivals (Tribeca Film Festival at Fondazione Prada”, 2004; “Italian Kings of the Bs. Secret History of Italian Cinema, 1949–1976”, 2004; “Secret History of Asian Cinema”, 2005; “Secret History of Russian Cinema”, 2007), multi-disciplinary and philosophy talks and architecture and design projects (“Herzog & de Meuron, OMA/AMO Rem Koolhaas. Projects for Prada. Works in Progress”, 2001; “Unveiling the Prada Foundation”, 2008; “Rotor: Ex Limbo”, 2011. In 2011, the Fondazione Prada opened a new exhibition space in Venice, the Ca’ Corner della Regina, a historic palazzo on the Grand Canal, which has hosted several collective exhibitions: “Fondazione Prada_Ca’ Corner”, 2011; “The Small Utopia. Ars multiplicata”, 2012, “When Attitudes Become Form: Bern 1969/Venice 2013”, 2013 and "Art or Sound", 2014.

Special international projects by the Fondazione include "Double Club" by Carsten Höller in London, "Prada Transformer" by OMA in Seul and "24h Museum" by Francesco Vezzoli at the Palais d’Iéna in Paris.

Between 2005 and 2009, on the occasion of the Venice Biennale, solo exhibitions by Francesco Vezzoli (2005), Thomas Demand (2007), John Wesley (2009) were presented at the Giorgio Cini Foundation in Venice.

Other artists exhibited included Anish Kapoor (1995), Louise Bourgeois (1997), Sam Taylor-Wood (1998), Walter De Maria (1999), Enrico Castellani (2001), Steve McQueen (2005), Tom Sachs (2006), Nathalie Djurberg (2008) and John Baldessari (2010)

== Venues in Milan ==
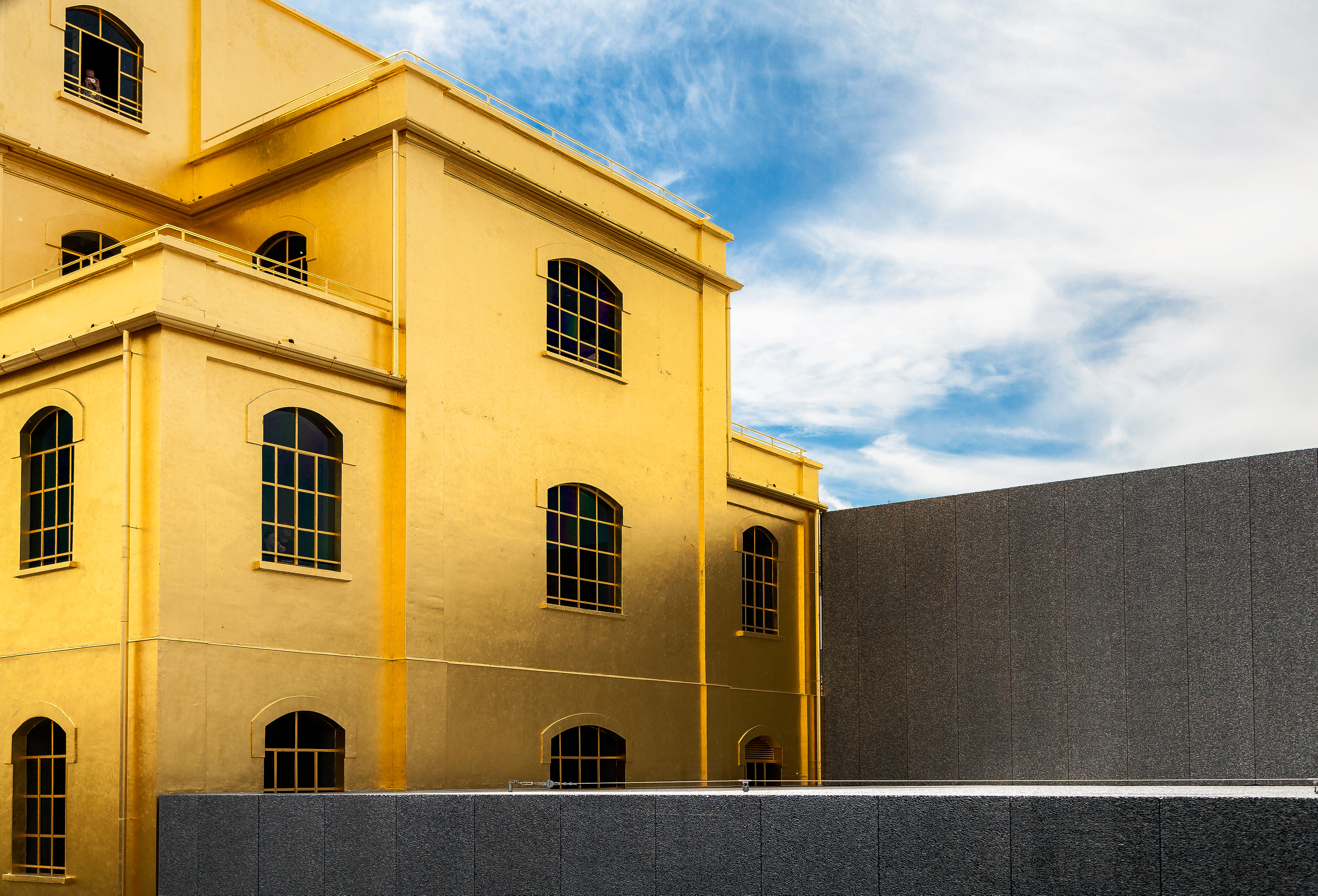
Fondazione Prada, Milan

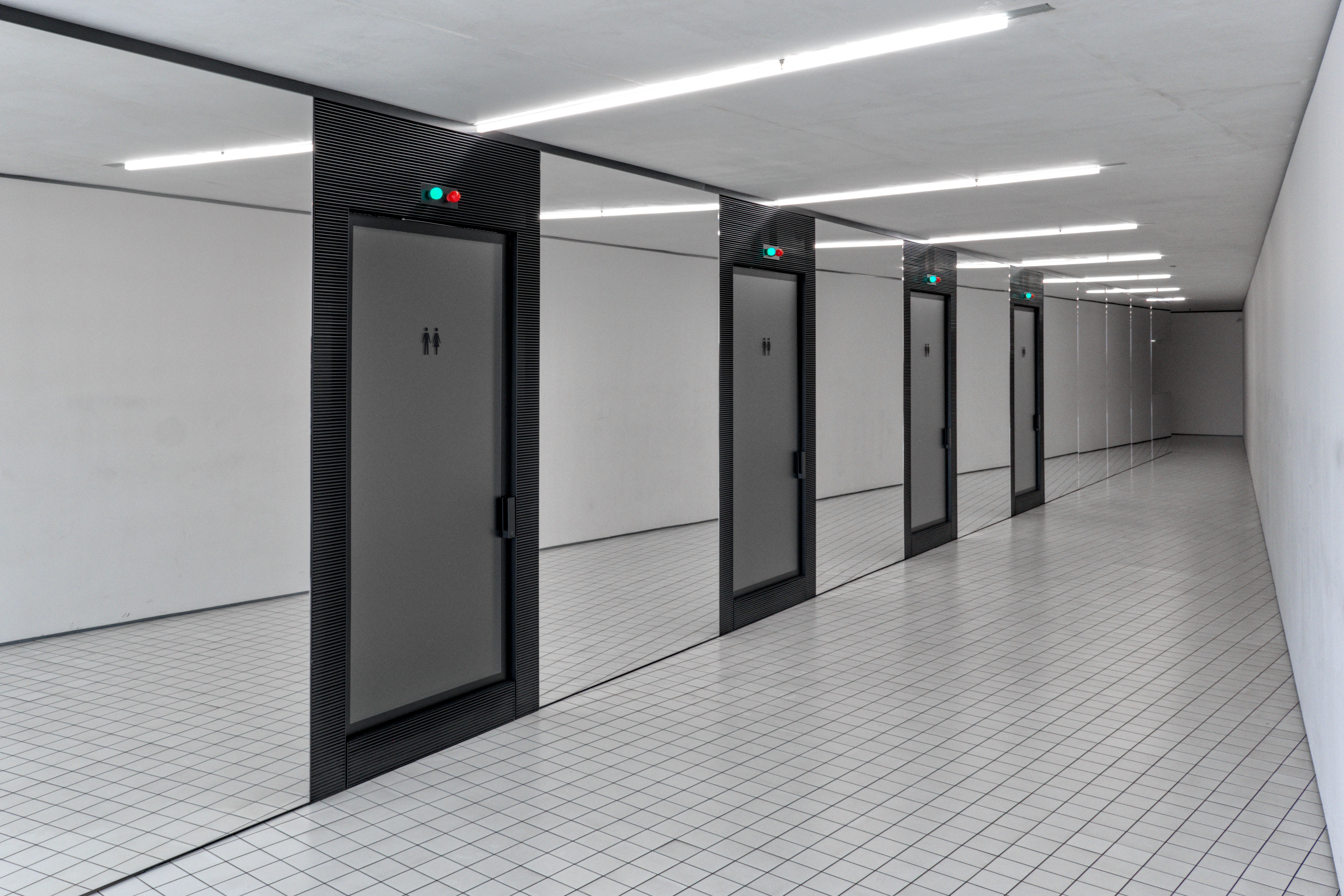
Fondazione Prada, Milan

=== Largo Isarco ===
On 9 May 2015, the Fondazione Prada unveiled its new permanent Milan venue, in Largo Isarco. The new Milan venue of the Fondazione, conceived by architecture firm OMA—led by Rem Koolhaas—expands the repertoire of spatial typologies in which art can be exhibited and shared with the public. The complex, which is the result of the transformation of a former distillery dating back to the 1910s, is articulated by an architectural configuration which combines preexisting buildings with three new structures, named “Podium”, “Cinema” and “Torre”. The hallmark of the new venue is the so-called “Haunted House”, a 4-story building, clad in 24 carat gold foil, where pieces from the permanent collection of art of the Fondazione Prada are permanently on display.
Located in Largo Isarco, in the South of Milan, the compound has a gross surface area of 19,000 m^{2}/205,000 ft^{2}, of which 11,000 m^{2}/118,000 ft^{2} is dedicated as exhibition space. The entrance building welcomes visitors to two new facilities, developed through special collaborations: a kids' area designed by a group of students from the École nationale supérieure d'architecture de Versailles, and a bar where director Wes Anderson has recreated the typical mood of old Milan cafés.

On the occasion of the opening of its new Milan venue, Fondazione Prada presented a wide range of activities. Robert Gober and Thomas Demand realized site-specific installations in dialogue with the industrial architecture and the new spaces in the compound. Roman Polanski explores the cinematographic inspirations behind his artistic vision, through a new documentary and a series of film screenings. Selections of artworks from the Prada Collection are presented in a series of thematic exhibitions.

In September 2015, the Fondazione hosted its very first performing arts project, “Atlante del gesto”, a series of choreographic actions conceived by Virgilio Sieni. In November 2015, Fondazione Prada presented an anthological exhibition devoted to Gianni Piacentino (Turin, 1945) and curated by Germano Celant. The thematic exhibition “Recto Verso” presented in December 2015, showcased artworks that consciously foreground the hidden, concealed or forgotten phenomenon of “the back.”

In early 2016, the Cinema at Fondazione Prada hosted “Flesh, Mind and Spirit” is a selection of 15 films chosen by Academy Award-winning director Alejandro González Iñárritu (Mexico City, 1963) in collaboration with Elvis Mitchell, film critic and Curator at LACMA of Los Angeles.

On 4 February 2016, "Goshka Macuga: To the Son of Man Who Ate the Scroll" opened to the public - developed by artist Goshka Macuga for Fondazione Prada's spaces, it brings together reflections on seminal issues such as time, beginnings and endings, collapse and renewal.

One of the museum's first exhibits was a large collection of works by Edward Kienholz. The exhibition included Five Car Stud, an installation that had not been available for public view.

=== Osservatorio ===
In 2016, the Fondazione launched Osservatorio, a photography gallery on the fifth and sixth floors of Milan's Galleria Vittorio Emanuele II.

== Venues in Venice ==
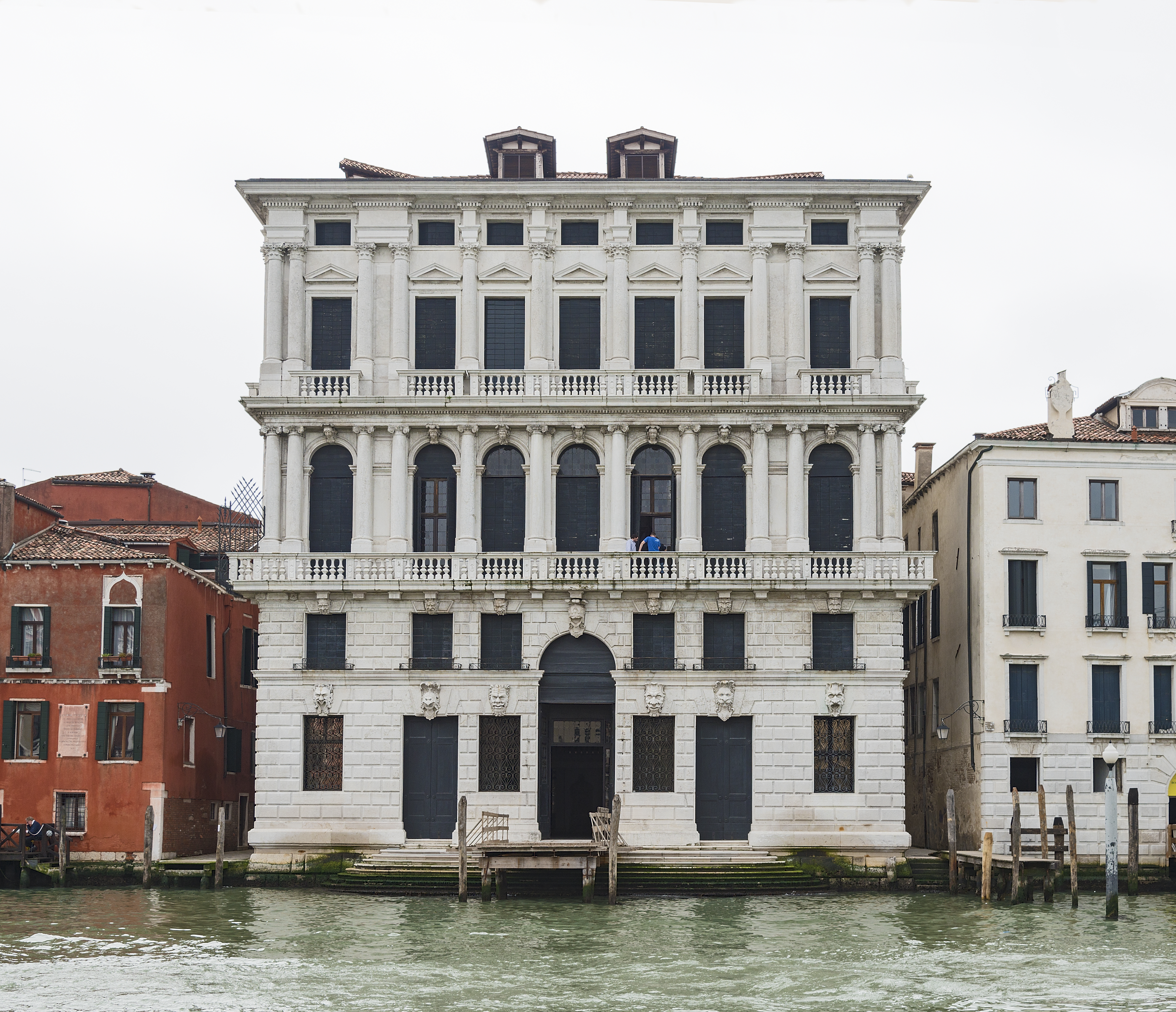
Fondazione Prada Venice at Ca’ Corner della Regina

The Fondazione Prada was the private sector partner of a series of retrospective in Italian Cinema, first launched at the 61st Venice International Film Festival called The Secret History of Italian Cinema.

The Fondazione operates an exhibition in the 18th century Palazzo Corner della Regina, which now also houses the History Archives of the Contemporary Art Exhibition of the Biennale di Venezia. From May and throughout summer 2015, both locations were thematically linked by two antiquity art exhibitions, the Serial Classic (ending on 24 August 2015) and the Portable Classic (ending on 13 September 2015), devised by Salvatore Settis.

== See also ==
- List of largest art museums
