= Consolation (album) =

2022 studio album by Pomme

Studio album by Pomme
- Released: 26 August 2022
- Genres: Folk rock; indie pop; chanson française
- Length: 37:09
- Language: French
- Labels: Sois Sage Musique; Polydor Records
- Producers: Pomme; Flavien Berger

Pomme chronology
Les Failles (2019)	Consolation (2022)	Saisons (2024)

Singles from Consolation
- 1. "tombeau" Released: june 7, 2022; 2. "Nelly" Released: june 17, 2022; 3. "vide" Released: January 13, 2023

Consolation (stylized in all lowercase) is the third studio album by French singer Pomme. It was released on August 26, 2022 at Sois sage musique / Polydor Records.

== Promotion ==
The first single from the album was unveiled during a session on A Colors Show on June 2, 2022. It was officially released on June 7 and is titled tombeau. Its release was accompanied by the announcement of the album Consolation, set for release on August 26 of the same year.

On June 17, 2022, the second single from the album, the song Nelly, was unveiled, along with a music video. In this song, Pomme pays tribute to the Quebecois writer Nelly Arcan.

On January 16, 2023, the singer announced on her social media the release of a reissue of her album, (Lot 2) Consolation, scheduled for February 10, 2023.

== Track listing ==
=== Consolation ===
No.	Title	Length
1.	"22:51"	0:33
2.	"jardin"	4:52
3.	"dans mes rêves"	3:37
4.	"la rivière"	4:26
5.	"Nelly"	3:25
6.	"septembre"	2:34
7.	"bleu"	4:15
8.	"when I c u"	3:58
9.	"puppy"	1:23
10.	"tombeau"	2:47
11.	"allô"	3:49
12.	"B."	1:30

=== (Lot 2) Consolation ===
The tracklist of the reissue was announced a month before its release on January 16, 2023, along with the opening of pre-orders.

No.	Title	Length
1.	"rien pour toi"
2.	"rdv"
3.	"tout ça"
4.	"un million"
5.	"very bad"

== Participants ==
Credits adapted from the physical album notes of "Consolation".

Musicians

- Pomme – vocals, piano and pocket piano, acoustic and electric guitar, omnichord
- Flavien Berger – sampler, backing vocals, and synthesizers
- Laurie Torres – percussion, drums, and organ
- Agathe Dupéré – bass, acoustic and electric guitars, synth bass, effects, and backing vocals
- Simon Veilleux – mandolin and violin
- Albin de la Simone – additional piano (track 4)
- Ghyslain Luc Lavigne – effects
- Rose Normandin – string arrangements
- Yu Bin Kim – violin
- Marianne Houle – cello
- Zoé Dumais – violin
- Gabriel Desjardins – wind arrangements
- Jean-Sébastien Vachon – tuba
- David Carbonneau – trumpet
- Jérôme Dupuis-Cloutier – trumpet
- Renaud Gratton – trombone

Production

- Pomme – production
- Flavien Berger – production
- Ghyslain Luc Lavigne – mixing
- Marc Thériault – mastering

Design

- Claude Ponti – illustrations
- Lian Benoit – photography
- Raegular – graphic design

Recording

- Recorded by Ghyslain Luc Lavigne, assisted by Charles St-Amour at Wild and Treatment Room studios in Saint-Zénon and Montreal.
- Vocal recordings of Pomme and additional sounds by Flavien Berger at La Savonnerie and Radio 89 studios in Brussels.

== Charts ==
Chart (2019–2020)	Peak position
Belgian Albums (Ultratop Wallonia)	5
French Albums (SNEP)	4
Swiss Albums (Schweizer Hitparade)	32
