= Saisons =

2024 studio album by French singer Pomme

Studio album by Pomme
- Released: 22 March 2024
- Genre: Orchestral music; Folk rock; indie pop; chanson française
- Length: 35:58
- Label: Sois Sage Musique; Polydor
- Producer: Pomme

Pomme chronology
Consolation (2022)	Saisons (2024)

Alternative cover
- EP cover

Singles from Saisons
- 1. "_dec carte de noël" Released: november 11, 2023; 2. "_jun perseides" Released: february 29, 2024

Saisons (transl. "Seasons") is the fourth studio album by the French singer Pomme. It was released on March 22, 2024, under Sois Sage Musique and Polydor Records.

This album, which bridges the gap between folk music, French music, and classical music, takes the form of an orchestral and conceptual album designed as a modern opera. In it, Pomme explores the different seasons and months of the year through music. The album is divided into four movements, one for each season, each with its own cohesive atmosphere and musical universe, where every song represents a month of the year.

== Context and production ==
The album originated from the singer's desire to write Christmas songs, which were later associated with winter and the seasons. The concept of an orchestral album came to her after a concert with the Radio France Philharmonic Orchestra and arrangements by Malvina Meinier. In an interview with Tsugi magazine, Pomme described Saisons as an album inspired by Quebec, composed of composed of 12 songs divided into 4 movements, each split into 3 acts. "It's an ode to the seasons, a way for me to change my working method. A way to reconnect with a slower rhythm, to stop running, really. There's this idea of naturalism, where I'm more of an observer than the main character."

The first movement of the album, "Autumn-Winter," was created in collaboration with Flavien Berger for the autumn section and Aaron Dessner (from the American band The National) for the winter section. The orchestral arrangements were composed by conductor Malvina Meinier.

== Release and promotion ==
In early November 2023, Pomme invited her followers on social media to subscribe to a newsletter that would provide updates on her upcoming releases. On November 8, 2023, fans received an email containing a password and a link to a dedicated website for the upcoming album, Pomme — Saisons, where they could preorder vinyls, CDs, and specific merchandise. The complete album was finally released on March 22, 2024, under the title Saisons — édition intégrale.

=== Singles ===
The album's first single, "_dec carte de noël", was released on November 10, 2023. On the same day, the upcoming release of the album's first movement, titled "Autumn-Winter," was announced for December 1, 2023. The second part was announced for 2024. The single's music video was published on November 21, 2023. The second single, "_jun perseides", was released on February 29, 2024, while the complete album release was confirmed for March 22.

=== Video Films ===
On February 16, 2024, Pomme shared a video on her social media explaining the term "ghosting," accompanied by a date announcement: February 23, 2024. On this date, she released a music video titled Saisons, le film: hiver on her YouTube channel, illustrating the concept of ghosting with melodies from the "Winter" section of the album. The short film was co-directed with Hugo Pillard.

Three additional musical short films were created in collaboration with Hugo Pillard and Nina Richard, resulting in a total runtime of 36 minutes: Saisons, le film: printemps, announced on March 28, 2024, addressing eating disorders; Saisons, le film: automne, released on May 3, 2024; Saisons, le film: été, released on July 5, 2024.

== Track listing ==
Saisons (Automne-Hiver)
No.	Title	Length
1.	"_mar le temps des fleurs"	4:14
2.	"_apr le temps des fleurs"	2:57
3.	"_may le temps des fleurs"	2:07
4.	"_jun perseides"	2:56
5.	"_jul perseides"	1:58
6.	"_aug perseides"	3:55
Total length:		18:07

Saisons (Printemps-Été)
No.	Title	Length
1.	"_sept magie mauve (feat. Flavien Berger)"	3:57
2.	"_oct magie mauve (feat. Flavien Berger)"	1:59
3.	"_nov magie mauve (feat. Flavien Berger)"	3:02
4.	"_dec carte de noël"	2:04
5.	"_jan carte de noël"	4:30
6.	"_feb carte de noël"	2:19
Total length:		17:51

Saison – édition intégrale

I. Le temps des fleurs
No.	Title	Length
1.	"mars"	4:14
2.	"avril"	2:57
3.	"mai"	2:07
Total length:		9:18

II. Perseides
No.	Title	Length
4.	"juin"	2:56
5.	"juillet"	1:58
6.	"août"	3:55
Total length:		6:34

III. Magie mauve
No.	Title	Length
7.	"septembre" (featuring Flavien Berger)	3:57
8.	"octobre" (featuring Flavien Berger)	1:59
9.	"novembre" (featuring Flavien Berger)	3:02
Total length:		8:58

IV. Carte de Noël
No.	Title	Length
10.	"décembre"	2:04
11.	"janvier"	4:30
12.	"février"	2:19
Total length:		8:53

== Personnel ==
Credits adapted from the liner notes of Saisons.

=== Musicians ===
- Claire Pommet – songwriting, vocals, composition, guitars, triangle, keyboard, bells, background vocals
- Malvina Meinier – composition (I, II), orchestral arrangements
- Flavien Berger – composition, background vocals, piano, bells (III)
- Aaron Dessner – composition, piano, synthesizer (IV)
- Joachim Baumerder, Camille Garin, Lison Favard, Marie-Anne Favreau, Lou Leveque – violins
- Maelle Desbrosses, Nina Tonji – violas
- Maia Collette, Adrienne Auclair – cellos
- Sulivan Loiseau – double basses
- Lilou Claverie – flute
- Ariane Bacquet, Coralie Ménuge – oboes
- Anne-Sophie Lobbé, Lauriane Maudry – clarinets
- Diane Mugot, Chloé Balducchi – bassoons
- André Jaeger – trumpet
- Elodie Baert – horn
- Jessica Simon – trombone
- Christophe Alary – saxophone

=== Artwork ===
- Claire Pommet – concept
- Lawrence Fafard – photography
- Juste du Feu – art director, set design
- Catherine Thibault – assistant art director
- Mélodie Wronski – styling
- Laurence Boire, Ascètes – furniture
- Safia Nolin – graphic design

=== Production ===
- Ghyslain Luc Lavigne – mixing
- Marc Thériault – mastering

=== Recording ===
- Studios Treatment Room (Montreal)
- Studios La Savonnerie (Brussels)
- Studios Mini Pond (Biarritz)
- Studios Ferber (Paris)
