= Les Failles =

2019 studio album by Pomme

Studio album by Pomme
- Released: 1 November 2019
- Genres: Folk rock; indie pop; chanson française
- Length: 32:25
- Language: French
- Label: Polydor Records
- Producers: Pomme; Albin de la Simone

Pomme chronology
À peu près (2018)	Les Failles (2019)	Consolation (2022)

Singles from Les Failles
- 1. "je sais pas danser" Released: 30 August 2019; 2. "anxiété" Released: 27 September 2019; 3. "vide" Released: 24 January 2020; 4. "les oiseaux" Released: 14 May 2020; 5. "grandiose" Released: 30 August 2020; 6. "chanson for my depressed love" Released: 30 October 2020; 7. "magie bleue" Released: 18 December 2020; 8. "les cours d'eau (Oklou Remix)" Released: 22 January 2021

Les Failles (transl. "The Faults") is the second studio album by French singer Pomme, released on 1 November 2019 through Polydor Records. The album was produced by Pomme and Albin de la Simone and the lyrics were all written by Pomme. An expanded version titled Les Failles cachées was released 14 February 2020, and an expanded version titled Les Failles cachées (Halloween Version) was released 30 October 2020.

== Promotion ==
Pomme presented Les Failles in the radio broadcasting program Popopop! of France Inter, on 29 October 2019, where she performed the song "je sais pas danser". In the program, Pomme announced a tour throughout France starting in January 2020.

On 30 August, "je sais pas danser" was released as the first single of Les Failles. A month later, "anxiété" was released as the second single of the album.

== Critical reception ==
Professional ratings
Review scores
Source	Rating
Le Devoir	4/5 stars

Les Failles received critical acclaim. Le Devoir's Sylvain Cormier said "this second album of the most [...] is of a sober elegance, of an exquisite taste in restraint". Addict Culture's Camille Locatelli said that the album is "sort of sensitive diary that she reveals with modesty and poetry", adding that "it's an intriguing mix of chanson française and dream folk", and concluded that "Les Failles is a jewel burning with truth, to listen by the fireside or in the dark. Perfect for rocking your fall, so".

== Track listing ==
=== Les Failles ===
All tracks are written by Pomme. All titles are entirely spelled in lowercase.

No.	Title	Length
1.	"anxiété"	3:51
2.	"je sais pas danser"	2:18
3.	"grandiose"	3:15
4.	"les séquoias"	3:13
5.	"les oiseaux"	3:16
6.	"pourquoi la mort te fait peur"	3:36
7.	"la lumière"	3:41
8.	"soleil soleil"	2:37
9.	"saphir"	2:40
10.	"une minute"	4:08
11.	"chapelle"	2:50
Total length:		35:25

=== Les Failles cachées ===
Expanded version released 14 February 2020. All tracks are written by Pomme. All titles are entirely spelled in lowercase.

No.	Title	Length
1.	"anxiété"	3:51
2.	"je sais pas danser"	2:18
3.	"grandiose"	3:15
4.	"les séquoias"	3:13
5.	"les oiseaux"	3:16
6.	"1996"	4:21
7.	"les cours d'eau"	3:01
8.	"les cours d'eau - Solo"	2:58
9.	"vide"	2:22
10.	"sorcières" (featuring Klô Pelgag)	3:58
11.	"pourquoi la mort te fait peur"	3:36
12.	"la lumière"	3:41
13.	"soleil soleil"	2:37
14.	"saphir"	2:40
15.	"une minute"	4:08
16.	"chapelle"	2:50
Total length:		52:05

=== Les Failles cachées (Halloween Version) ===
Expanded version released 30 October 2020. All tracks are written by Pomme. All titles are entirely spelled in lowercase.

No.	Title	Length
1.	"anxiété"	3:51
2.	"je sais pas danser"	2:18
3.	"grandiose"	3:15
4.	"les séquoias"	3:13
5.	"les oiseaux"	3:16
6.	"1996"	4:21
7.	"les cours d'eau"	3:01
8.	"les cours d'eau - Solo"	2:58
9.	"vide"	2:22
10.	"sorcières" (featuring Klô Pelgag)	3:58
11.	"pourquoi la mort te fait peur"	3:36
12.	"la lumière"	3:41
13.	"soleil soleil"	2:37
14.	"saphir"	2:40
15.	"une minute"	4:08
16.	"chapelle"	2:50
17.	"magie bleue" (featuring Flavien Berger)	7:45
18.	"chanson for my depressed love"	3:09
19.	"comme tu dis"	4:02
Total length:		67:01

== Personnel ==
Credits adapted from Les Failles liner notes.

=== Musicians ===
- Pomme – lead vocals, arrangements, piano (track 1, 3), acoustic guitar (track 2, 4, 6, 8, 10), synthesizer (track 9)
- François Poggio – guitar (track 1), electric guitar (all tracks except 5, 9, 11)
- Albin de la Simone – arrangements, drum programming (track 1), synthesizer programming (track 1, 3, ), synthesizer (track 4, 7, 8), bass guitar (track 2, 6), piano (track 2, 6, 7, 10), organ (track 6, 7)
- Raphael Chassin – drums (track 1, 4), percussion (track 2, 3, 6, 7, 8, 10)
- Renée Largeron – vocals (track 10)

=== Design ===
- Ambivalently Yours – illustration, graphic design

=== Production ===
- Albin de la Simone – production
- Pomme – production
- Ghyslain-Luc Lavigne – mixing, engineering

=== Recording ===
- Recorded at a personal studio

== Charts ==
=== Weekly charts ===
Chart (2019–2020)	Peak position
Belgian Albums (Ultratop Wallonia)	24
French Albums (SNEP)	10
Swiss Albums (Schweizer Hitparade)	87

=== Year-end charts ===
Chart (2020)	Position
Belgian Albums (Ultratop Wallonia)	97
French Albums (SNEP)	73

Chart (2021)	Position
Belgian Albums (Ultratop Wallonia)	172
