= À peu près =

2017 studio album by French singer Pomme

Studio album by Pomme
- Released: 6 October 2017
- Studios: Dare Dare Studio; Melodium Studio
- Genres: Folk rock; indie pop; chanson française
- Length: 39:41
- Language: French
- Label: Polydor Records
- Producers: Benjamin Hekimian; Matthieu Joly; Yann Arnaud; Siméo

Pomme chronology
En cavale (2016)	À peu près (2017)	Les Failles (2019)

Singles from À peu près
- 1. "De là-haut" Released: September 8, 2017; 2. "A Lonely One" Released: September 15, 2017; 3. "On brûlera" Released: September 22, 2017; 4. "Pauline" Released: September 28, 2017; 5. "À peu près" Released: June 21, 2018

À peu près (transl. "Nearly") is the debut studio album by French singer Pomme, released on October 6, 2017 through Polydor Records.

== Deluxe edition ==
On April 20, 2018 a deluxe edition of À peu près was released in digital download format, featuring five bonus tracks recorded live in the "Sessions Montréalaises", those five tracks were also released separately the next day in vinyl format as an EP with the title A Peu Près - Sessions Montréalaises.

== Critical reception ==
Professional ratings
Review scores
Source	Rating
Le Devoir	3/5 stars

Madmoizelle's Lucie Kosmala said that accepting the album is "accepting to let oneself be enveloped by a melancholy folk and delightful for the time of thirteen titles", and also praised the lyrics: "Her poetic lyrics interweave metaphors into profound and even spiritual songs". She also referred to the influence of chanson française in her music, saying that "other titles finally come to flirt with the chanson française that one could describe as more patrimonial, but at the same time they're being completely modernized, like "Ceux qui rêvent"".

Le Devoir's Sylvain Cormier praised Pomme's voice: "[...] and that voice with a deliciously porous tone, this voice with an astonishing register that goes from the ultra-acute to the subtle melodies".

== Track listing ==
No.	Title	Writer(s)	Length
1.	"À peu près"	Pomme	3:26
2.	"Même robe qu'hier"	Ben Mazué	2:45
3.	"Ce garçon est une ville"	Abel K1	2:33
4.	"Comme si j'y croyais"	Yannick Marais	3:15
5.	"La gare"	Pomme	3:34
6.	"Adieu mon homme"	Julien Bensenior	3:17
7.	"La lavande"	Pomme	4:19
8.	"De là-haut"	Pomme, Jean Felzine	2:43
9.	"A Lonely One"	Don Cavalli	3:25
10.	"Pauline"	Jean Felzine	2:39
11.	"Ceux qui rêvent"	Julien Bensenior	1:58
12.	"On brûlera"	Pomme	3:27
13.	"De quoi te plaire"	Siméo	2:20
Total length:			39:41

Deluxe edition
No.	Title	Writer(s)	Length
14.	"De quoi te plaire" (live Session Montréalaise, featuring Les Sœurs Boulay)	Siméo	2:25
15.	"A Lonely One" (live Session Montréalaise, featuring Elliot Maginot)	Don Cavalli	4:04
16.	"Pauline" (live Session Montréalaise, featuring Fanny Bloom)	Jean Felzine	2:28
17.	"Comme si j'y croyais" (live Session Montréalaise, featuring Philémon Cimon)	Yannick Marais	2:55
18.	"On brûlera" (live Session Montréalaise, featuring Safia Nolin)	Pomme	3:49
Total length:			56:42

== Personnel ==
Credits adapted from À peu près liner notes.

Musicians

- Pomme – lead vocals, acoustic guitar (track 1, 3, 6, 12), autoharp (track 1 to 3, 6, 8, 10), backing vocals (track 1, 2, 3, 4, 5, 6, 8, 11), cello (track 3, 5, 8), electric guitar (track 7, 12), double bass (track 2), omnichord (track 4), glockenspiel (track 9)
- Benjamin Hekimian – acoustic guitar (track 2, 4, 5, 6, 8, 9, 10, 11), bass (track 1, 2, 4, 6, 8, 10, 11, 12), electric guitar (track 1, 2, 4, 5), drums (track 8, 12), percussion (track 1, 6, 8, 10, 12), ukulele (track 2), lap steel guitar (track 3)
- Matthieu Joly – drum programming (track 1, 2, 3, 5, 6, 7, 8, 10, 12), keyboards (track 1, 2, 3, 5, 6, 7, 8, 10, 12), mellotron (track 9), organ (track 1, 6, 8, 10, 12), piano (track 3, 10, 11), synthesizer (track 4), omnichord (track 4)
- Rémi Sanna – drums (track 1, 7, 8, 11, 12)
- Olivier Marguerit – bass (track 4), acoustic guitar (track 4), piano (track 4), synthesizer (track 4)
- Rafael Angster – bassoon (track 4)
- Jean Thévenin – drums (track 4)
- Sammy Decoster – electric guitar (track 4)
- Yann Arnaud – percussion (track 4)
- Stéphane Bellity – synthesizer (track 4)
- Julien Bensenior – backing vocals (track 6)
- Siméo – guitar (track 13)

Design

- Marta Bevacqua – photograph
- Frank Loriou – artwork

Production

- Waxx & Matt (Benjamin Hekimian & Matthieu Joly) – production (track 1, 2, 3, 5, 6, 7, 8, 9, 10, 11, 12)
- Yann Arnaud – production (track 4)
- Siméo – production (track 13)
- Nicolas Risser – mastering
- Antoine Gaillet – mixing
- Matthieu Joly – recording (track 1, 2, 3, 5, 6, 7, 8, 9, 10, 11, 12)
- Yann Arnaud – recording (track 4)
- Siméo – recording (track 13)
- Christopher Colesse – recording assistance (track 1, 2, 3, 5, 6, 7, 8, 9, 10, 11, 12)

Recording

- Recorded at Dare Dare Studio and Melodium Studio (Montreuil, Paris)
- Mixed at Studio Soyouz
- Mastered at Studio Kilohertz
- Produced at Melodium Studio

== Charts ==
Chart (2017)	Peak position
Belgium (Ultratop 200 Wallonia)	200
France (SNEP)	91
