= En cavale =

2016 EP by French singer Pomme

EP by Pomme
- Released: 1 January 2016
- Recorded: 2015–2016
- Studio: La Frette Studios; Melodium Studio; Studio Polydor
- Genre: Folk rock; indie pop; chanson française
- Length: 15:54
- Label: Polydor Records
- Producer: Yann Arnaud

Pomme chronology
En cavale (2016)	À peu près (2017)

Singles from En cavale
- 1. "J'suis pas dupe" Released: June 29, 2015

En cavale (transl. "On The Run") is the first extended play by French singer Pomme, released on January 1, 2016 through Polydor Records. The album was produced by Yann Arnaud. En cavale follows the release of her first single "J'suis pas dupe" on June 29, 2015, including that track in the album.

== Track listing ==
No.	Title	Writer(s)	Length
1.	"J'suis pas dupe"	Claire Pommet	3:23
2.	"En cavale"	Louis Aguilar	5:50
3.	"Sans toi"	Vianney Bureau	3:03
4.	"Jane & John"	Simon Rochon Cohen	2:38
Total length:			15:54

== Personnel ==
Credits adapted from En cavale liner notes.

Musicians

- Pomme – lead vocals, cello (track 1), backing vocals (track 1, 2)
- Olivier Marguerit – bass, piano (track 1, 3, 4), synthesizer (track 1, 3), organ (track 2, 4), backing vocals (track 2), trumpet (track 3)
- Sammy Decoster – guitar, banjo (track 1, 4), backing vocals (track 2)
- Jean Thevenin – drums, percussion
- Jan Ghazi – guitar (track 4)
- Victor Roux – compositor (track 1, 4)

Design

- Frank Loriou – design
- Lucie Sassiat – photography

Production

- Yann Arnaud – production, mixing (track 3), recording
- Jean-Dominique Grossard – additional recording
- Antoine Chabert – mastering, engineering

Recording

- Recorded at La Frette Studios, Melodium Studio and Studio Polydor
- Mixed at La Frette Studios and Melodium Studio
- Mastered at Translab
- Produced at La Frette Studios and Melodium Studio
