= The Lonely One =

The Lonely One or Lonely One may refer to:

== Film and television ==
- "The Lonely Ones", 1964 episode of Ben Casey
- "The Lonely One", 1992 episode of The Ray Bradbury Theatre
- "The Lonely Ones", 1961 episode of Dr. Kildare

== Music ==
=== Albums ===
- The Lonely One..., 1959 album by jazz pianist Bud Powell
- The Lonely One, 2014 EP by Dana Williams
- Lonely Ones, album by Graham Colton

=== Songs ===
- "Lonely One", 2018 song by Nariaki Obukuro
- "The Lonely One", by Nat King Cole from After Midnight, 1957
- "The Lonely One", 1959 song by Duane Eddy
- "The Lonely One", by Alice Deejay from Who Needs Guitars Anyway?, 2000
- "(I'm) The Lonely One", song written by Gordon Mills, recorded by Cliff Richard and Tom Jones
- "Lonely One", by Milow from Modern Heart, 2016
- "Lonely One", by Swollen Members from Armed to the Teeth, 2009
- "A Lonely One", by Pomme from À peu près, 2017
