= Kiara (drag queen) =

Canadian drag entertainer

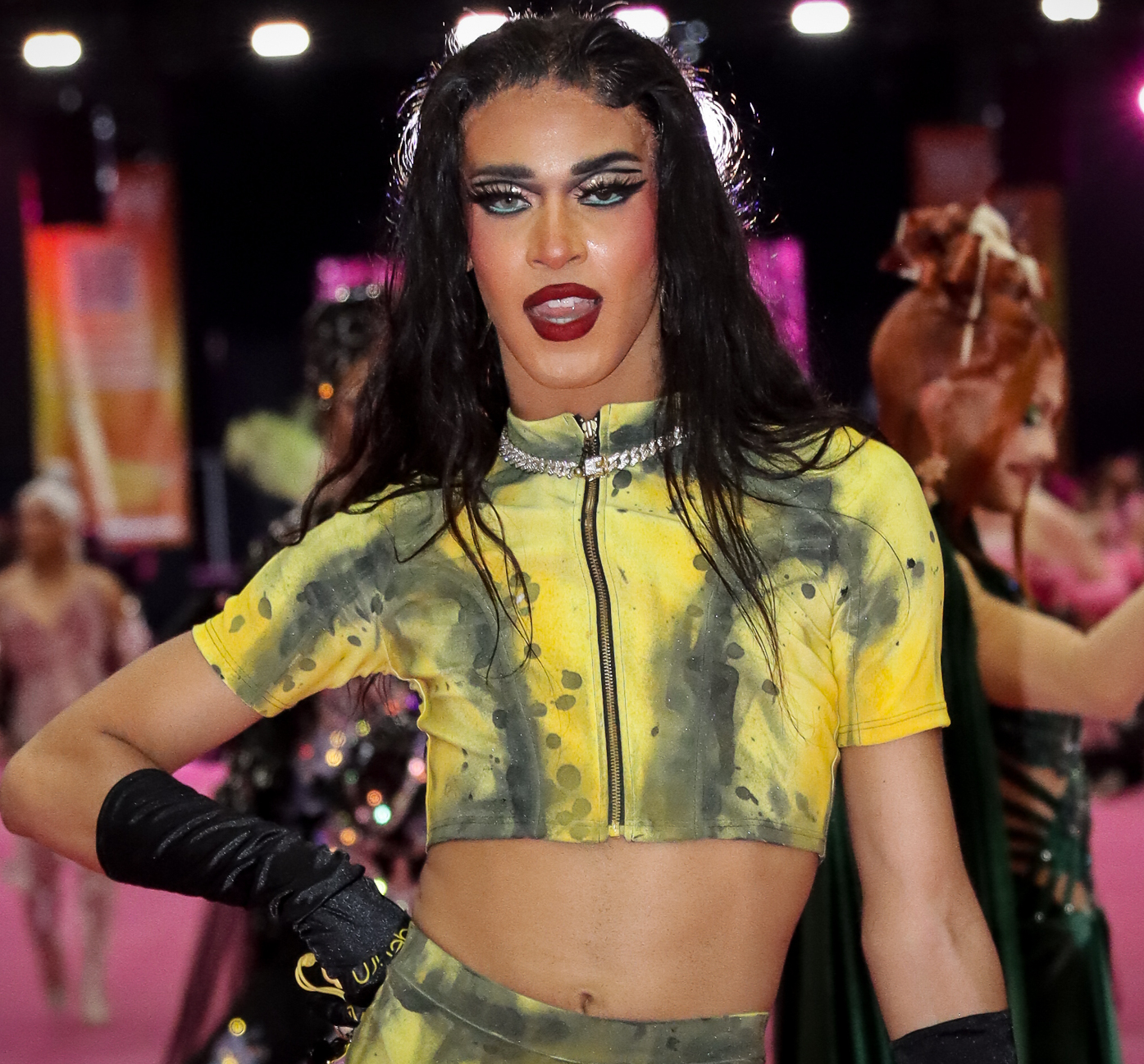
- Kiara at RuPaul's DragCon LA 2024
- Born: Dimitri Nana-Côté; July 28, 1998 (age 28); Quebec City, Quebec, Canada
- Other names: Kiara Schatzi; Kiara Mulan
- Education: Concordia University (BFA)
- Occupation: Drag queen
- Years active: 2010s–present
- Known for: Canada's Drag Race

Kiara, sometimes credited as Kiara Schatzi or Kiara Mulan, is the stage name of Dimitri Nana-Côté (born July 28, 1998), a Canadian drag entertainer from Montreal, Quebec who is most noted as a competitor in the first season of Canada's Drag Race.

== Early life and education ==
The biracial son of a Black Canadian father and a Québécois mother, Nana-Côté grew up in Quebec City, and moved to Montreal to study film at Concordia University. He began performing drag at Cabaret Mado, including as Mel B in a regular Spice Girls tribute show, choosing the drag name Kiara in reference to the character Kiara from The Lion King.

== Career ==
Kiara appeared on the first season of Canada's Drag Race, and was eliminated from the competition in the fifth episode after performing a poor impression of Mariah Carey in the Snatch Game challenge; however, her Lip Sync for Your Life performance against Priyanka, to Céline Dion's cover of "I Drove All Night", was widely labelled as the best lipsync battle of the season and one of the best in the history of the Drag Race franchise. In a post-elimination interview with the entertainment website PopBuzz, Kiara revealed that she had considered impersonating Canada's Drag Race judge Stacey McKenzie.

On June 24, 2020, after production on Canada's Drag Race had wrapped but before the series had begun airing, Kiara was the host of Sainte-Jeanne, an LGBTQ-themed Saint-Jean-Baptiste Day celebration coordinated by singer-songwriter Safia Nolin, whose participants also included comedians Tranna Wintour and Karl Hardy, actress and writer Gabrielle Tremblay, songwriter and producer Annie Sama (Apigeon), rapper Backxwash and drag queens Matante Alex and Gisèle Lullaby. For the special online edition of Fierté Montréal's Drag Superstars show, which saw all of the queens from Canada's Drag Race appearing in prerecorded video performances, Kiara performed to Marie-Mai's single "Qui prendra ma place" in a video which climaxed with her dancing in front of the Montreal Biosphere.

Following the conclusion of the season, Kiara participated in the national Canada's Drag Race Live at the Drive-In tour.

In October 2020, Kiara appeared in the video for Cœur de pirate's single "T'es belle". In the same month, Kiara released her first single as a vocalist, a bilingual collaboration with Matante Alex and Marc-André Sauvageau titled "Straight to Your Heart" in English and "Droit sur ton cœur" in French.

Kiara also had a small acting role in "The Son", an LGBT-themed episode of the 2020 television anthology series Little America.

She is an active ballroom participant and part of the Canadian chapter of the Imperial Dynasty Kiki House of Hua Mulan, where she holds the title of "Princess".

== Filmography ==
=== Television ===
- Canada's Drag Race (season 1)
- Bring Back My Girls (2022)
