= Matthieu Mendès =

French singer, songwriter, record producer and guitarist

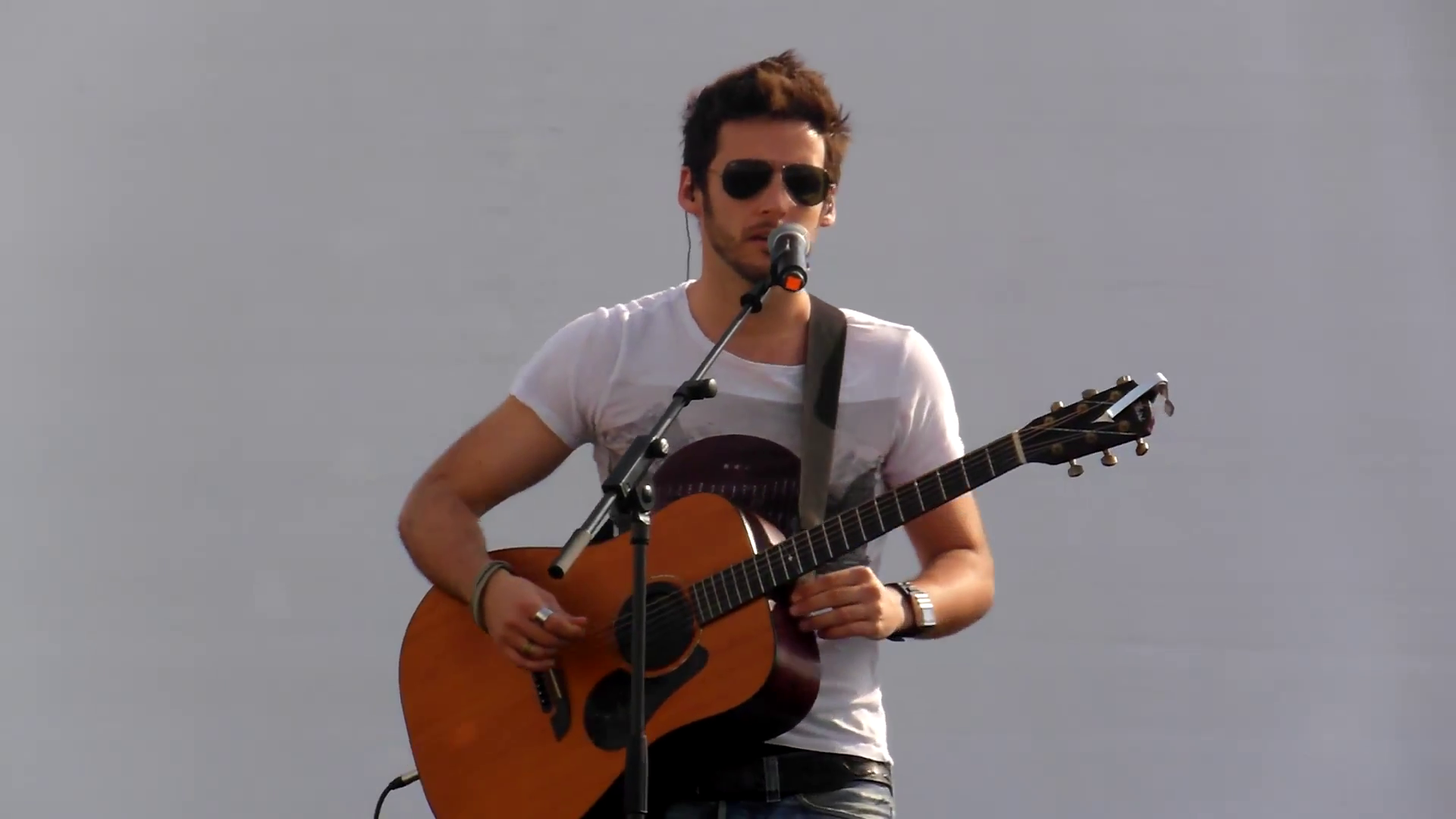

Background information
- Birth name: Matthieu Bernard Houbé
- Also known as: Mendes the Dude
- Born: 7 March 1982 (age 43); Arras, Hauts-de-France, France
- Genres: Pop, Rock
- Years active: 2005 – present
- Labels: EMI Music France
- Website: www.mendesthedude.com

Matthieu "Mendès" Bernard Houbé (born 7 March 1982 in Arras, Hauts-de-France) is a French singer, songwriter, record producer and guitarist. He has worked with a number of well-known artists including M. Pokora, Ycare, Luce and others and composed soundtracks for a number of films.

== Career ==
Matthieu Mendès passed his adolescence in north of France. At eight he picked up a guitar and played in a young local band. Before concentrating on music, he obtained his college degree in Physics, and then commenced his studies in an engineering school in Paris. During his studies, he started to write lyrics in French. 2004 saw his first single "J'en sais rien" and was signed to Peermusic France releasing his self-titled debut album Matthieu Mendès on Warner.

In 2006, he co-wrote Adrienne Pauly's single "J'veux un mec" and in the following two years composed soundtracks for a number of films, including the K. Duffy's American film Becoming Blond, for the French TV series Flics created by Olivier Marchal and for Dom Juan sur Seine by Jérôme Maldhé.

In 2009, Matthieu Mendès collaborated with the young artist Ycare, a notable contestant in Nouvelle Star composing, arranging and pre-producing Ycare's prospective album and writing Ycare's second hit single "J'y crois encore". In 2010, he toured with Jena Lee as her guitarist and worked with yet another Nouvelle Star candidate and eventual winner Luce.

2011 saw a close collaboration with M. Pokora on the latter's new album À la poursuite du bonheur. This resulted in the two penning seven tracks on the album, namely three singles from the album "Juste un instant", "On est là", "Si tu pars" as well as album tracks "Reste comme tu es", "Sauve-toi", "Mon évidence" and "Cours". The association between the two continued in the French musical Robin des Bois with Matthieu Mendès as part of the writing team of the musical, that had a successful run after premiering on 26 September 2013.

In 2013, he released his own new single "Jour après jour", in preparation for a full new album Echo on EMI, eight years after his debut album. In addition to "Jour après jour", the album includes his second single "Okay" featuring Pomme and includes a cover of the Téléphone hit "Cendrillon".

== Discography ==
=== Albums ===
Year	Album	Peak positions
Year	Album	FR
2005	Matthieu Mendès	105
2013	Echo	–

=== Singles ===
Year	Single	Peak positions	Album
Year	Single	FR	Album
2004	"J'en sais rien"	41	Matthieu Mendès
2012	"Jour après jour"	–	Echo
2013	"Cendrillon"	–	Echo
2013	"Okay" (feat. Pomme)	–	Echo
