= Pomme (singer) =

French musician (born 1996)

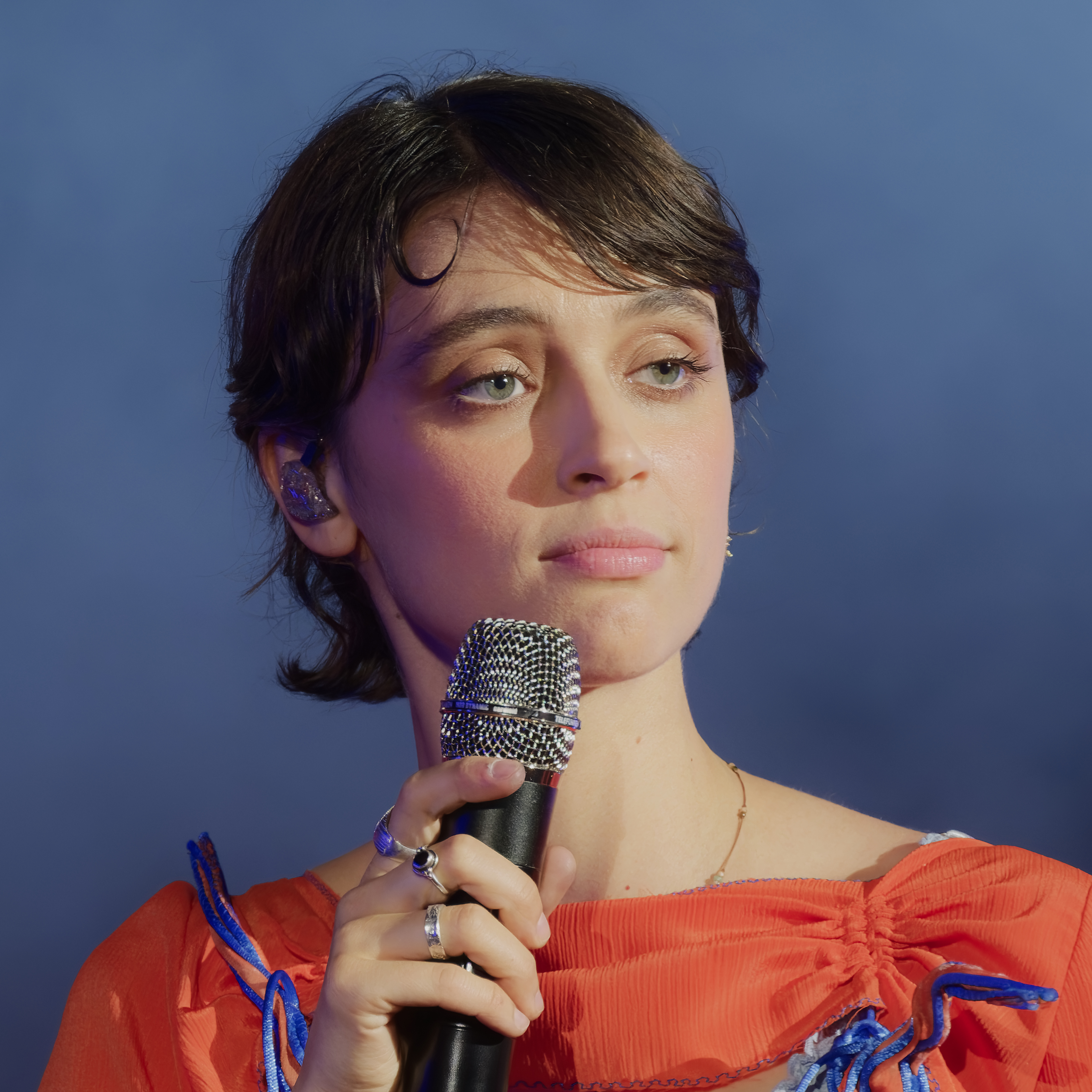
- Pomme performing in 2024

Background information
- Born: 2 August 1996 (age 30); Décines-Charpieu, Lyon, France
- Genres: Chanson; folk rock
- Occupations: Singer; songwriter; musician
- Instruments: Vocals; guitar; autoharp
- Years active: 2014–present
- Label: Polydor
- Spouse: Safia Nolin (m. 2022)
- Website: pommemusic.fr

Claire Pommet (French pronunciation: [klɛːʁ pɔmɛ]; born 2 August 1996), known professionally as Pomme (pronounced [pɔm]; French for 'Apple'), is a French singer, songwriter, musician, and actress. Born and raised near Lyon, she learned to play several instruments at a young age. Her debut studio album, À peu près (2017), received critical acclaim for its mixture of pop and folk music and entered the French album charts at number 91. Pomme followed with her second studio album, Les Failles (2019), which became her first project to reach the top 10 in her home country. The record was later reissued as Les Failles cachées (2020) and re-entered record charts in two countries. Her third studio album, Consolation, was released on 26 August 2022.

== Life and career ==
=== 1996–2012: Early life ===
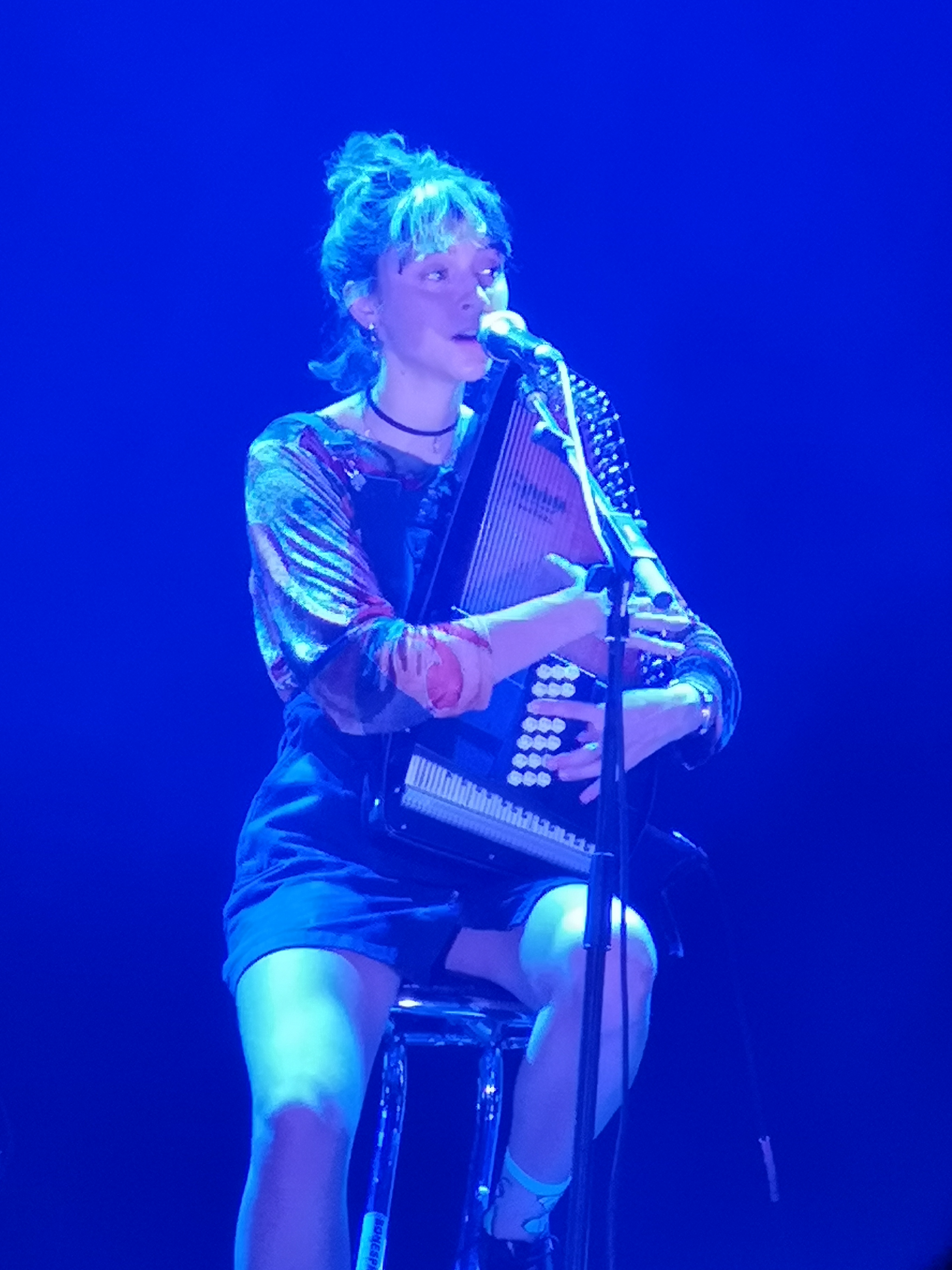
Pomme playing autoharp at a concert in Bourges, September 2020

Claire Pommet was born on 2 August 1996 in Décines-Charpieu but grew up in Caluire-et-Cuire, a French town in the metropolis of Lyon. She learned music theory with her three siblings from the age of 6, joined a children's choir, La Cigale de Lyon, at age 7, and learned to play the cello at age 8. Her mother plays the flute while her father, a real estate agent, listened to Michel Polnareff, Serge Reggiani, and Charles Aznavour. One of her father's friends introduced her to American folk and country music. She is self-taught and publishes videos on the YouTube web platform.

=== 2013–2015: Career beginnings and En cavale ===
Pommet's stage name "Pomme", which derives from her last name, was a nickname used by her friends at university. In early 2015, Pomme was signed to Polydor Records and began working on her debut extended play (EP) En cavale. She released her debut single "J'suis pas dupe" in June 2015. Following the EP's release in January 2016, it received a positive reception and was promoted with music videos and concerts.

=== 2016–2017: À peu près ===
In September 2017, aged 21, she performed for the first time at La Boule Noire in Paris. In October she released her first chanson française album, titled À peu près; it was described as a mixture of pop and folk by Salome Rouzerol-Douglas in Le Figaro. It was "very encouraging" according to Gilles Renault in Libération. At the same time, Marie-Catherine Mardi of RFI said that "the lyrics do not convince [in their entirety]" but praised Pommet's voice. Despite the acclaim received, Pomme expressed frustration towards the album since she felt trapped by "the desire to please [others] more" instead of herself. She performed in the first part of the Asaf Avidan tour in autumn 2017.

=== 2018–2020: Les Failles ===
In February 2018, she performed at the Café de la Danse in Paris, after having performed as an opening act for Louane and Vianney, then took the stage in La Cigale in mid-2018 and in La Trianon in early 2019. In 2019, she released her second studio album Les Failles (2019), which was later reissued a year later. Described by Pomme as an album with "absolute truth and humility", she conceived it while reflecting on a breakup. In February 2020, she won the Victoires de la Musique award for album révélation ("newcomer album") of the year with Les Failles. The singer later released the EP Quarantine Phone Sessions in May 2020, which she stated to be available only during the COVID-19 lockdowns.

=== 2021–present: Consolation ===
In 2021, she was crowned artiste féminine ("female artist") of the year. On New Year's Day 2022, Pomme revealed plans of releasing a third studio album later that year through her Twitter account. Later in that month, her collaboration "Everything Matters" with Norwegian singer-songwriter Aurora was released as a single from the latter's third studio album, The Gods We Can Touch.

In May 2022, she published the children's book Sous les paupières with French singer Pauline de Tarragon, who also did the illustrations.

She released her third studio album Consolation on August 26, 2022.

In 2024, she released two tracks in collaboration with Japanese folk artist Ichiko Aoba, a French version of Aoba's song "Seabed Eden" and a Japanese version of Pomme's song "Grandiose".

On November 20, Pomme will release her album, la forteresse, her first after leaving her label Universal. She announced collaborating with The National's Bryce Dessner at the PEOPLE festival, Berlin.

== Artistry ==
Pomme's music incorporates chanson française, folk-pop, French pop and indie folk. The journalists of Libération and Le Figaro emphasized the quality of Pomme's live performances, during which she primarily plays the autoharp and the guitar. The lyrics she writes often evoke themes of love, death, and "everyday situations that resort to romanticism". She has dedicated songs to her wife, Quebec singer Safia Nolin. Other topics she explored are intimacy, feminism, and environmentalism, which she considered to be "natural and obvious to me for my generation and for myself."

Pomme noted that despite being heavily influenced by folk music, she has also listened to pop musicians. She cited French singers Barbara, Édith Piaf and Lorie as her primary influences, with Barbara and Lorie being singers she listened to during her childhood and youth. Other influences include Lady Gaga, Lizzo, Celine Dion, Lily Allen, Camélia Jordana, Cœur de Pirate, Keaton Henson, Aldous Harding, Feist, Sufjan Stevens, Mylène Farmer, Dolly Parton and Kate Nash. Vogue France called her appearance "a fairy-like look straight out of a Tim Burton movie," with Pomme calling Burton's film Charlie and the Chocolate Factory and its protagonist Willy Wonka as style icons for her. She was also inspired by French poet Paul Éluard and feminist works and comics.

== Personal life ==
Pomme explained in an interview with Télérama: "I am naturally comfortable with my homosexuality, for example, using female pronouns in my songs. And I think it's important, given the amount of thank-you messages I get. As a teenager, I would have also liked to recognize myself in lesbian singers". Pomme's songs also often refer to her love story with singer Safia Nolin, who became her wife in 2022. The two now share their life in Paris and Montreal. For the 2020 municipal elections in Lyon, she made public her support for the Europe Écologie Les Verts party. In February 2021, in support of the #MeToo movement, Pomme stated that she had been "manipulated and morally and sexually harassed" from age 15 to 17.

== Discography ==
=== Studio albums ===
Title	Details	Peak chart positions		
Title	Details	FRA	BEL (Wa)	SWI
À peu près	Released: 6 October 2017; Label: Polydor; Formats: CD, LP, digital download, streaming	91	200	—
Les Failles	Released: 1 November 2019; Label: Polydor; Formats: CD, LP, digital download, streaming	10	24	87
Consolation	Released: 26 August 2022; Label: Polydor; Formats: CD, LP, digital download, streaming	4	5	32
Saisons	Released: 22 March 2024; Label: Polydor; Formats: CD, LP, digital download, streaming	17	—	—
"—" denotes album that did not chart or was not released.

=== Reissues ===
Title	Details	Peak chart positions	
Title	Details	FR	SWI
Les Failles cachées	Released: 14 February 2020; Label: Polydor; Formats: CD, LP, digital download, streaming	76	73
les Failles cachées (Halloween Version)	Released: 30 October 2020; Label: Polydor; Formats: CD, LP, digital download, streaming	—	—
(Lot 2) Consolation	Released: 10 February 2023; Label: Polydor; Formats: CD, LP, digital download, streaming	—	—

=== Extended plays ===
Title	EP details
En cavale	Released: 1 January 2016; Label: Polydor; Formats: CD, digital download, streaming
A Peu Près – Sessions Montréalaises	Released: 21 April 2018; Label: Polydor; Format: LP
Quarantine Phone Sessions	Released: 20 April 2020; Label: Polydor; Formats: Digital download, streaming

=== Singles ===
==== As lead artist ====
Title	Year	Peak chart positions									Certifications	Album
Title	Year	FRA	AUS	BEL (WA)	CAN	GER	NLD	UK	US	WW	Certifications	Album
"J'suis pas dupe"	2015	—	—	66	—	—	—	—	—	—		En cavale
"Même Robe qu'hier"	2017	—	—	76	—	—	—	—	—	—		À peu près
"Mon Frère" (Rough Version)	2018	—	—	—	—	—	—	—	—	—		Non-album single
"De là-haut" (Radio Remix)	2018	—	—	—	—	—	—	—	—	—		À peu près
"J'attends" (with Ben Mazué)	2018	—	—	—	—	—	—	—	—	—		Les Femmes idéales
"2019"	2019	—	—	—	—	—	—	—	—	—		Non-album single
"Je sais pas danser"	2019	—	—	—	—	—	—	—	—	—		Les Failles
"Anxiété"	2019	—	—	—	—	—	—	—	—	—		Les Failles
"Vide"	2020	—	—	—	—	—	—	—	—	—		Les Failles cachées
"La Lumière"	2020	—	—	—	—	—	—	—	—	—		Les Failles cachées
"Grandiose"	2020	—	—	—	—	—	—	—	—	—		Les Failles cachées
"À perte de vue"	2021	—	—	—	—	—	—	—	—	—		Non-album singles
"Itsumo Nando Demo"	2021	—	—	—	—	—	—	—	—	—		Non-album singles
"Tombeau"	2022	—	—	—	—	—	—	—	—	—		Consolation
"Nelly"	2022	—	—	—	—	—	—	—	—	—		Consolation
"Ma Meilleure Ennemie" (with Stromae)	2024	1	1	23	29	28	21	19	69	11	SNEP: Diamond; ARIA: Gold; BRMA: Platinum; BPI: Silver	Arcane League of Legends: Season 2
"La Nuit"	2025	—	—	—	—	—	—	—	—	—		La Venue de l’avenir
"Des Excuses"	2025	—	—	—	—	—	—	—	—	—		Non-album singles
"Le Village"	2026	—	—	—	—	—	—	—	—	—		Non-album singles
"—" denotes single that did not chart or was not released.

==== As featured artist ====
Title	Year	Peak chart positions		Album
Title	Year	FRA	BEL (Wa)	Album
"Okay" (Matthieu Mendès featuring Pomme)	2013	—	57	Echo
"Debout les femmes (as part of 39 Femmes)	2018	—	—	Non-album single
"Le train du soir" (Raphaël featuring Pomme)	2020	—	—	Haut fidélité
"Galore (French Version)" (Oklou featuring Pomme and Danny L Harle)	2021	—	—	"Galore Anniversary" single
"Everything Matters" (Aurora featuring Pomme)	2022	—	—	The Gods We Can Touch
"Grand Soleil" (Damso featuring 18 other artists, including Pomme)	2025	56	—	Non-album single
"—" denotes single that did not chart or was not released.

=== Guest appearances ===
List of non-single guest appearances, with other performing artists, showing year released and album name
Title	Year	Other artist(s)	Album
"Entre ses bras"	2016	Cécile Corbel	Vagabonde
"Soleil brûlant"	2016	Various	We Love Disney 3
"Ghost"	2019	Waxx	Fantôme
"Je serai (ta meilleure amie)"	2019	Safia Nolin	Reprises, Vol. 2
"Ceux qui s'aiment"	2020	Various	De Béart a Béart(s) Vol. 2

=== Music videos ===
Title	Year	Director(s)
"J'suis pas dupe"	2015	Sébastien Brodart
"Je t'emmènerais bien"	2015	Sébastien Brodart
"En cavale"	2015	Sébastien Brodart
"Jane & John"	2015	Sébastien Brodart
"Sans toi"	2016	Sébastien Brodart
"De là-haut"	2017	Marta Bevacqua
"A Lonely One"	2017	Marta Bevacqua
"On brûlera"	2017	Marta Bevacqua
"Pauline"	2017	Marta Bevacqua
"Je sais pas danser"	2019	Vladimir Féral
"Anxiété"	2019	Hugo Pillard
"Les oiseaux	2020	Claire Pommet
"Grandiose"	2020	Claire Pommet and Ambivalently Yours
"Chanson For My Depressed Love"	2020	Claire Pommet and Hugo Pillard
"Magie bleue"	2020	Claire Pommet and Hugo Pillard
"À perte de vue"	2021	Vincent René-Lortie and Claire Pommet
"Nelly"	2022	Jeanne Joly and Claire Pommet

- Director information obtained from each video description on YouTube.

== Filmography ==
Year	Title	Role	Director	Notes
2023	Spirit of Ecstasy	Jeanne Francœur	Héléna Klotz	
2025	Colours of Time	Fleur	Cédric Klapisch	

== Bibliography ==
- Sous les paupières (2022) (with Pauline de Tarragon)
