= J'suis pas dupe =

2015 song by Pomme

Single by Pomme

from the EP En cavale
- Language: French
- English title: I'm Not Fooled
- Released: 29 June 2015
- Recorded: 2015
- Studio: La Frette (La Frette-sur-Seine, France); Melodium; Polydor
- Genre: Folk; indie rock
- Length: 3:20
- Label: Polydor
- Composer(s): Claire Pommet; Victor Roux
- Lyricist(s): Claire Pommet
- Producer(s): Yann Arnaud

Pomme singles chronology
"Okay" (2013)	"J'suis pas dupe" (2015)	"Même robe qu'hier" (2017)

Music video
- "J'suis pas dupe" on YouTube

"J'suis pas dupe" (transl. "I'm Not Fooled") is the first single by French singer Pomme from her debut EP En cavale and was released on 29 June 2015 via Polydor Records. "J'suis pas dupe" was written by Pomme herself and produced by Yann Arnaud, it reached position 66 in Belgium, becoming her second-highest song in that country after "Okay".

== Music video ==
The music video was directed by Sébastien Brodart, who also directed the rest of En cavale music videos, and was released on 29 June 2015. The music video shows Pomme riding a bicycle along a rural road.

== Personnel ==
Credits adapted from En cavale and "J'suis pas dupe" liner notes.

=== Musicians ===
- Pomme – lead and backing vocals, cello
- Olivier Marguerit – bass guitar, piano, synthesizer
- Sammy Decoster – guitar, banjo
- Jean Thevenin – drums, percussion
- Victor Roux – composer

=== Design ===
- Frank Loriou – design
- Lucie Sassiat – photography

=== Production ===
- Yann Arnaud – production, recording
- Jean-Dominique Grossard – additional recording
- Antoine Chabert – mastering, engineering

=== Recording ===
- Recorded at La Frette Studios (La Frette-sur-Seine, France), Melodium Studio (Paris, France), and Studio Polydor (London, England)
- Mixed at La Frette Studios (La Frette-sur-Seine, France) and Melodium Studio (Paris, France)
- Mastered at Translab (Paris, France)
- Produced at La Frette Studios (La Frette-sur-Seine, France) and Melodium Studio (Paris, France)

== Charts ==
Chart (2015)	Peak position
Belgium (Ultratip Wallonia)	66
