= Safia Nolin =

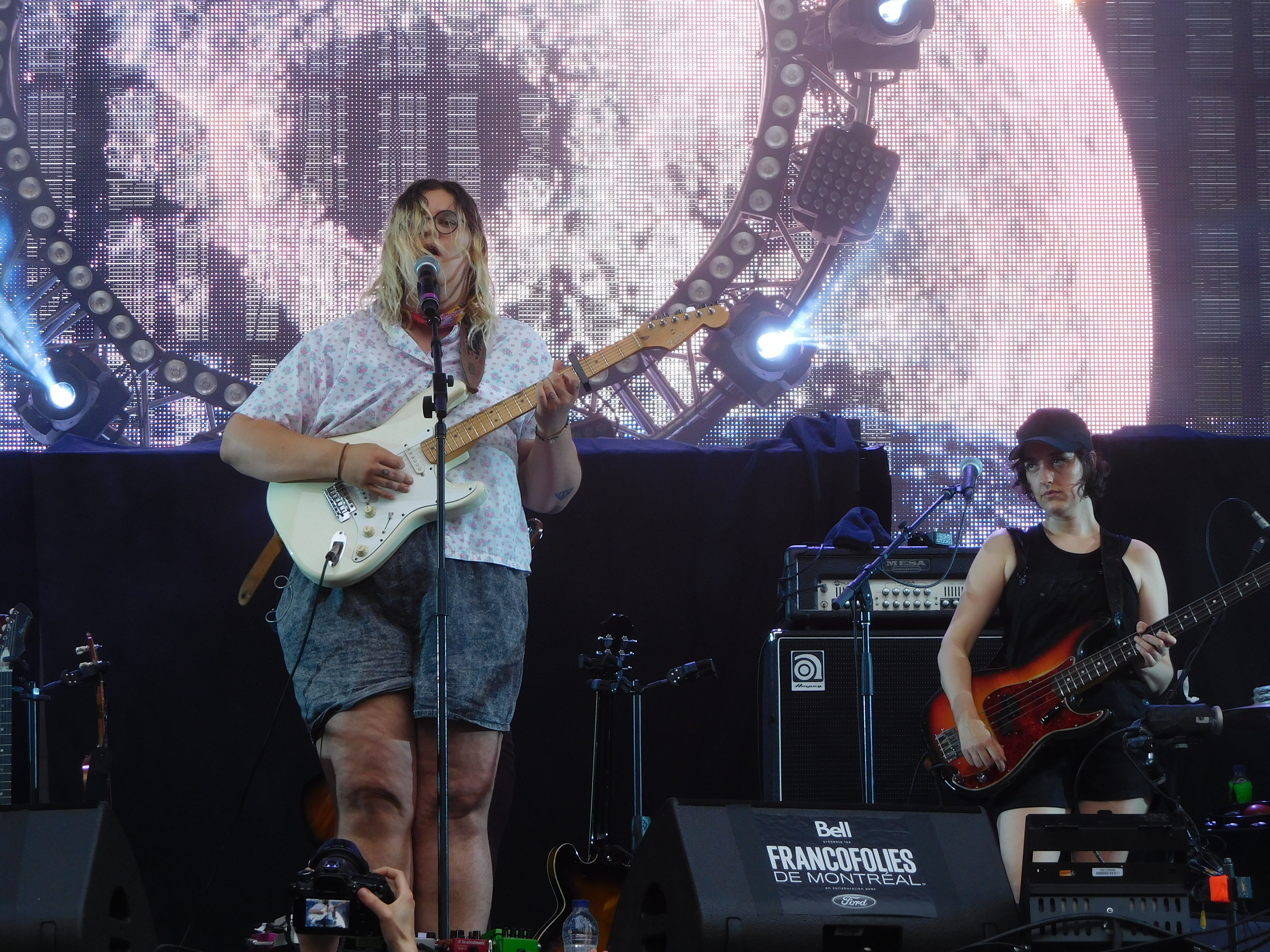
- FrancoFolies de Montréal, 2017

Background information
- Born: 1992 (age 33–34)
- Origin: Quebec City, Quebec
- Genres: indie pop; folk pop
- Years active: 2000s–present
- Label: Bonsound
- Spouse: Pomme (m. 2022)

Safia Nolin is a French Canadian folk-pop singer-songwriter from Quebec City, Quebec.

Her debut album, Limoilou, was released in 2015 via Bonsound. Modestly successful at first, her album sales increased significantly in 2016 after she appeared on Tout le monde en parle, opening up about her teenage struggles with anxiety and bullying. She has toured France as an opening act for Lou Doillon, and Quebec as an opening act for Louis-Jean Cormier.

In June 2016, she won the Prix Félix-Leclerc at the FrancoFolies de Montréal. Her song "Igloo" was shortlisted for the 2016 SOCAN Songwriting Prize, and Limoilou was named a longlisted nominee for the 2016 Polaris Music Prize.

Her second album, Dans le noir, was released in 2018.

She is out as lesbian. She is married to French singer Pomme.

In 2019, she released the EP xX3m0 $0ng$ 2 $!nG @L0nG 2Xx. It included a duet with John K. Samson, on a cover of Taking Back Sunday's "Cute Without the E".

In 2020, she coordinated Saint-Jeanne, an LGBTQ-inclusive Saint-Jean-Baptiste Day livestream scheduled for June 24. The event was hosted by Kiara, a Montreal drag queen who also competed in the first season of Canada's Drag Race, and the performance line-up included comedians Tranna Wintour and Karl Hardy, actress and writer Gabrielle Tremblay, songwriter and producer Annie Sama (Apigeon), rapper Backxwash, singer-songwriter FLORAA, and drag queens Matante Alex and Gisèle Lullaby.

In 2025, she cancelled her participation in a Fierté Montréal Pride event due to the festival's ties to pro-Israel groups. She instead performed at the city's alternative pride festival, Wild Pride.

== Discography ==
- Limoilou (2015)
- Reprises, Vol. 1 (2016)
- Dans le noir (2018)
- Reprises, Vol. 2 (2019)
- xX3m0 $0ng$ 2 $!nG @L0nG 2Xx EP (2019)
- Seum EP (2021)
- UFO Religion (2024)
- Reprises, Vol. 3 (2026)
