= Wild Pride =

LGBTQ organisation in Montreal, Canada

Wild Pride (French: Fierté Indomptable Montréal) is an LGBTQ organisation in Montreal, Canada co-founded by Aisha Stone, Samya Lemrini, Shannon Thompson, & Yara Coussa. It was created in 2025 in response to grievances against the city's mainstream Pride festival, Fierté Montréal. Wild Pride positions itself as “a radical, anti-colonial, anti-capitalist, anti-corporate and uncompromising Pride.” The organisation has taken a stance against Zionism, Pinkwashing, and Rainbow capitalism, notably refusing to take corporate sponsorships. Wild Pride held events throughout the city of Montreal from July 30 to August 18, 2025.

== History ==
=== Background and formation ===
On April 4, 2025, a joint statement published on Instagram by artistic collectives Blush, Discoño, ElleLui, and Sweet Like Honey, announced that they would no longer associate themselves with Fierté Montréal. The statement accused Fierté Montréal of abusive practices and creating events that were financially inaccessible to economically disadvantaged members of the city's queer community. Fierté Montréal issued a press release on April 9, accusing the collectives of intentionally spreading disinformation and emphasising the transparency and flexibility of their contracts.

The Consent Collective, a Montreal-based resource centre for victims of sexual assault, announced that it would be severing ties with Fierté Montréal in an Instagram post published on April 14. The collective cited concerns regarding the presence of Zionist groups at Fierté Montréal's parade, as well as the organisation's refusal to disavow corporate sponsors with investments in Israel. The announcement was made in tandem with four other organisations, including Helem's Montreal branch. Yara Coussa, a Helem Montreal board member, became a co-organiser of Wild Pride, which began online operations on the same day as the Consent Collective's announcement.

In May 2025, 10 LGBTQ organisations signed an open letter criticising Fierté Montréal, accusing the organisation of prioritising corporate sponsors over the needs of queer people. Wild Pride co-organizer Yara Coussa was among the letter's signatories .

Fierté Montréal's inclusion of Ga'ava, a Jewish community group, drew criticism after the group's president referred to pro-Palestinian activists who disrupted Fierté Montréal's 2024 festival as "pro-terror". Ga'ava was briefly uninvited from Fierté Montréal's 2025 festival before being reinvited shortly thereafter, sparking further backlash.

=== Wild Pride 2025 ===
Wild Pride held its opening ceremony on July 30, 2025, at Saint-Louis Square. The organisation's parade on August 10 was notably attended by members of Québec solidaire, including Manon Massé as well as the party's co-spokespersons, Ruba Ghazal and Guillaume Cliche-Rivard. The festival concluded with its closing ceremony on August 18. Other Wild Pride events such as workshops and performances were held throughout the city during August 2025. The organisation has expressed intention to continue operating "in the long term."

== Criticism ==
Ga'ava criticised Wild Pride for its use of the term "Intifada" in the name of one their 2025 events, "Intifada On The Dancefloor". The organisation rebuked the use of the term for its associations to "campaigns of bomb-related terrorism and deadly firearm assaults."

== Endorsements ==
Transition Montréal, along with its leader Craig Sauvé, endorsed Wild Pride in an Instagram post on August 8, 2025. Sauvé was the mayoral candidate for Transition Montréal in the 2025 Montreal municipal election.
