= Mona Greenbaum =

Canadian LGBT rights activist

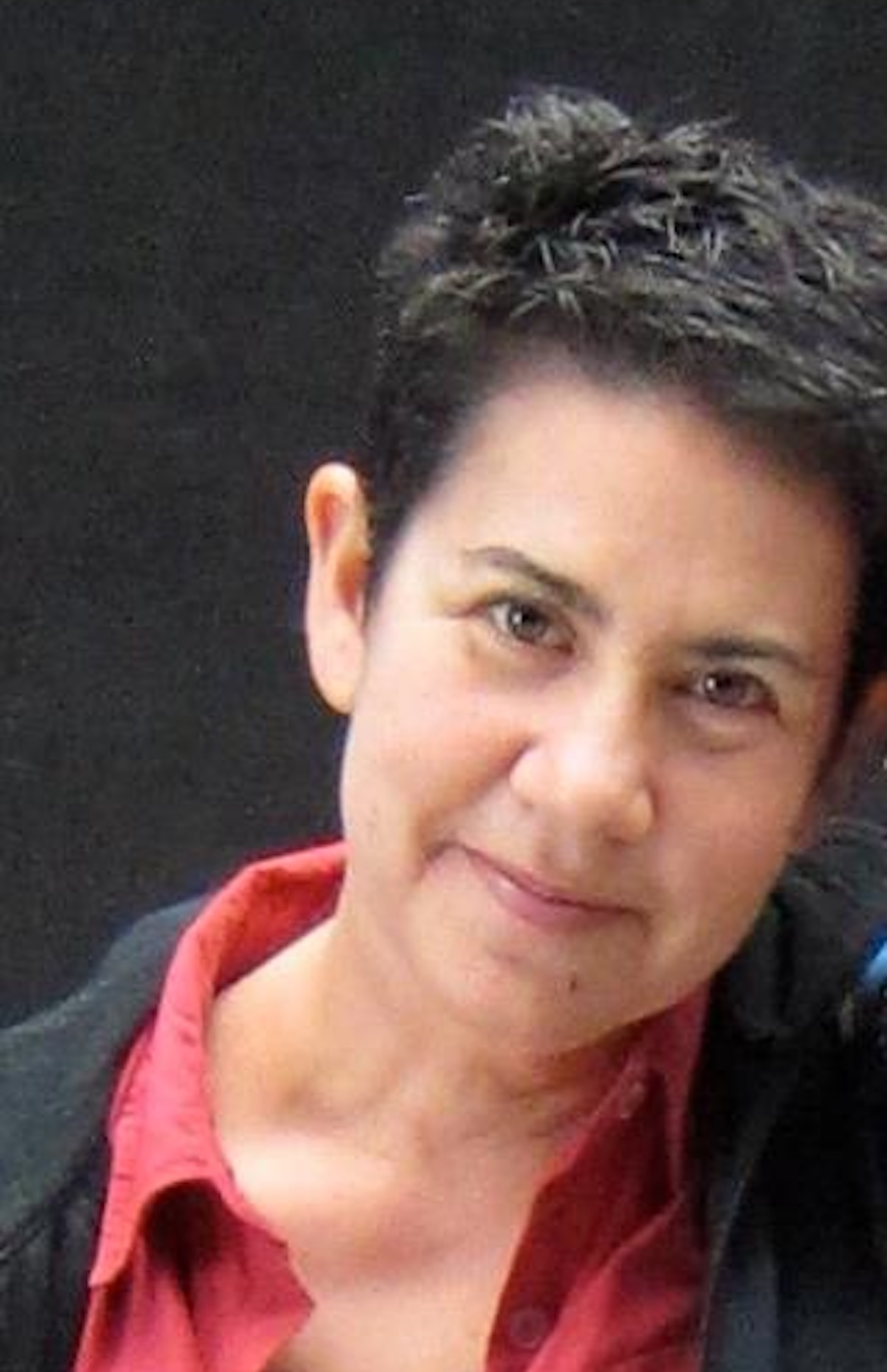
- Occupations: Activist, educator, author
- Organization: Coalition des familles LGBT+ (est. 1998)
- Known for: Founder and executive director of the LGBT+ Family Coalition

Mona Greenbaum (born June 18, 1964) is a Canadian LGBTQ+ rights activist, educator, and author based in Montréal, Quebec. She is the founder and executive director of the LGBT+ Family Coalition (fr:Coalition des familles LGBT+), an organization focused on the legal and social recognition of queer and trans families in Quebec and Canada.

== Early life and career ==
Born in western Montreal, Greenbaum trained as a biochemist. In 1998, Greenbaum and her partner Nicole Paquette founded the LGBT+ Family Coalition (Coalition des familles LGBT+, first known as the Association des mères lesbiennes or Association of Lesbian Mothers), to provide resources, advocacy, and community for same-sex parents in Quebec. The Coalition has since expanded its scope to include family law advocacy, anti-homophobia and anti-transphobia education and training at the provincial and national levels.

== Advocacy ==
Under Greenbaum's direction, the LGBT+ Family Coalitionhas led or contributed to numerous reforms and public consultations.

In 2001, the Association of Lesbian Mothers submitted a brief to the federal Standing Committee on Health concerning access to fertility clinics for women regardless of marital status or sexual orientation, a position later reflected in Canada's Assisted Human Reproduction Act (2004). The following year, the Association presented briefs before a Quebec parliamentary commission on the draft Civil Union Act, which resulted in the inclusion of parental rights and filiation for same-sex couples.

Between 2004 and 2006, Greenbaum participated in a Commission des droits de la personne et des droits de la jeunesse working group on homophobia in Quebec, which produced a 2007 report that informed Quebec's subsequent policy against homophobia and transphobia. From 2005 to 2006, she served on the scientific committee for the international conference "The Right to be Different," held in Montreal, which addressed the rights of LGBT persons and drew approximately 2,000 attendees from around one hundred countries.

In 2006, the Association was involved in the creation of Ulysse et Alice, a French-language children's picture book for ages three to seven depicting a family with two mothers, and promoted the book through media, unions, school boards, and book fairs.

Also in 2006, Greenbaum co-founded Multimundo, a coalition of 19 community organizations serving gay and lesbian individuals from ethnocultural communities.

Also in 2023, in celebration of its 25th anniversary the Coalition launched a traveling exhibition, Fierté et résilience, featuring the stories of over thirty 2SLGBTQ+ families across Quebec; the exhibition was shown at the National Assembly in 2025, the year of Greenbaum's retirement from the coalition.

== Work with the INSPQ ==
Since 2017, Greenbaum has worked as a trainer and consultant for the Institut national de santé publique du Québec (INSPQ), designing and delivering professional development programs on sexual and gender diversity for health, social services, and education workers.

== Selected publications ==
Greenbaum has piloted, authored or co-authored numerous educational and literary works, including:

- Association des mères lesbiennes du Québec (2005). Le respect et l'estime de soi : Parler de l'orientation et de l'identité sexuelle avec nos enfants.
- Bertouille, A. (2006). Ulysse et Alice (M.C. Favreau Illus.). Les éditions du remue-ménage. and its accompanying educator guide (2007)
- Greenbaum, M. (Dir.). (2015). Familles LGBT, le guide. Les éditions du remue-ménage.
- LGBT+ Family Coalition. (2020). Adoption and Fostering of Children Residing in Quebec (2020 edition).
- Drouin, M.-P. (Dir.). (2022). Des mots pour exister. Coalition des familles LGBT+.
- Chbat, M. (2024). Familles queers : Récits et célébrations (M. Greenbaum, Collab.; M. Houisse, Illus.). Les éditions du remue-ménage.
- LGBT+ Family Coalition. (2024). A Little Guide About Surrogacy (2nd edition).
- LGBT+ Family Coalition. (2025). Insemination Guide for Future 2SLGBTQ+ Parents (7th edition).

== Awards and recognition ==
- 2002 – Prix Arc-en-ciel (social action), Gala Arc-en-ciel
- 2002 – Named among the 20 most influential women of the year, Coup de Pouce magazine
- 2010 – Médaille de l'Assemblée nationale du Québec
- 2012 – Queen Elizabeth II Diamond Jubilee Medal
- 2013 – Prix Honoris, Gala Arc-en-ciel
- 2015 – Prix Hommage, Commission des droits de la personne et des droits de la jeunesse
- 2017 – Recognition by the Canadian Museum for Human Rights during Canada's 150th anniversary
- 2024 – Prix Hommage, Lesbian Visibility Day
- 2025 – King Charles III Coronation Medal
