= Fierté Montréal =

Annual LGBT event in Montreal, Quebec

Fierté Montréal Montreal Pride
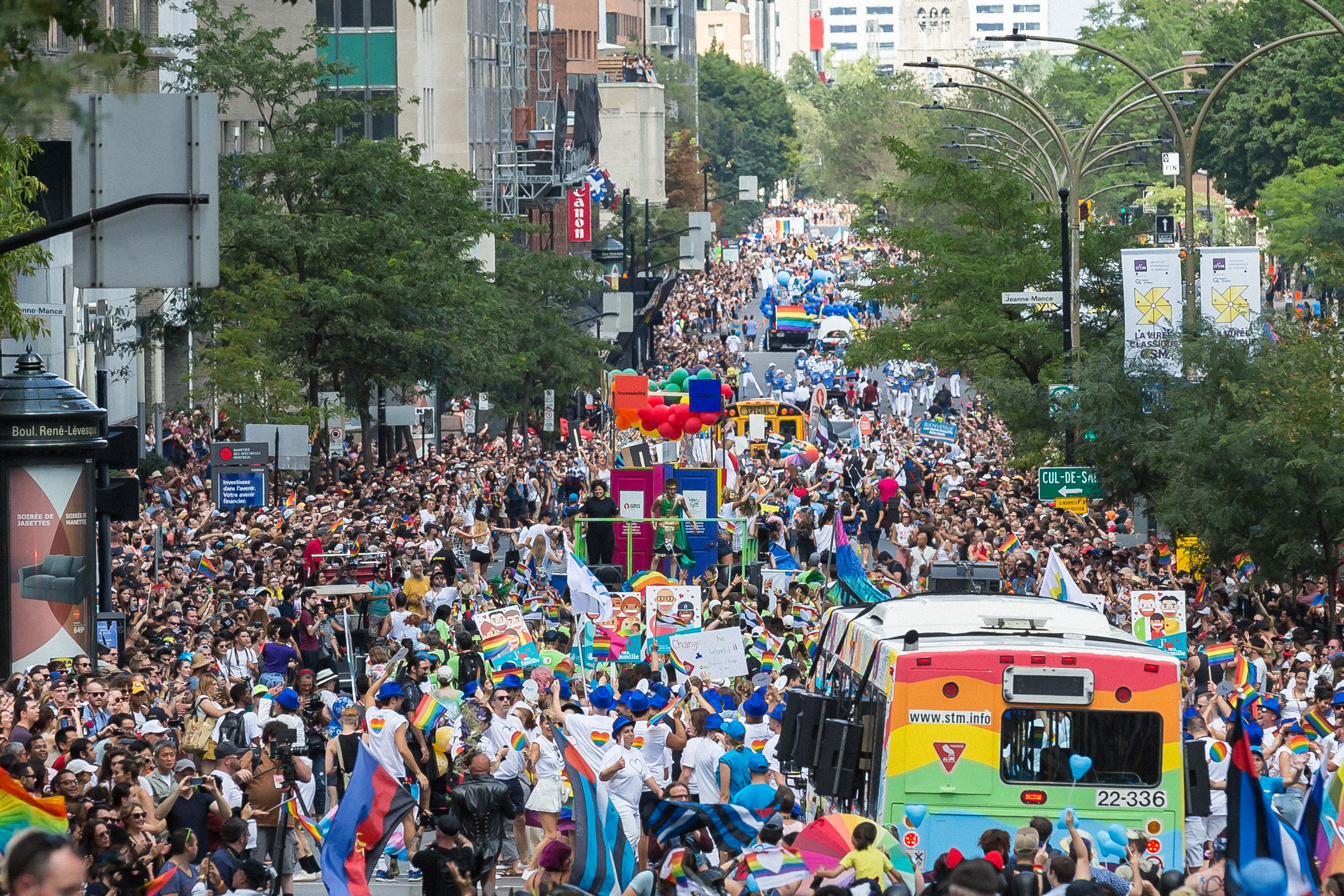
- 2018 Montreal Pride Parade
- Status: Active
- Genre: Pride festival
- Locations: Montreal, Quebec
- Country: Canada
- Years active: 19
- Inaugurated: 2007
- Attendance: 3.4 million entries (2019)
- Website: fiertemtl.com

Fierté Montréal, also called Montreal Pride, is an annual LGBT pride festival in Montreal, Quebec. The event was founded in 2007 at the initiative of Montreal’s LGBTQ+ communities after the city's prior Pride festival, Divers/Cité, repositioned itself as a general arts and music festival.

Montreal Pride is one of the largest LGBTQ+ festivals in Canada alongside Pride Toronto, and the largest LGBTQ+ gathering in the francophone world. Active year-round, Montreal Pride supports local LGBTQ+ communities and advocates on behalf of LGBTQ+ people living in countries that are hostile toward LGBTQ+ rights.

Today, Montreal Pride Festival attracts more than 3 million local and international visitors for 11 days of community, cultural, and festive activities including free shows, panels, and the parade.

== Fierté Canada Pride Montreal 2017 ==
Fierté Canada Pride Montreal 2017 Logo

From August 10 to 20, 2017, the festival’s special edition Fierté Canada Pride Montreal 2017, was featured as part of the official programming of Montreal’s 375th and Canada 150 celebrations. In the lead-up to the parade, Montreal Mayor Denis Coderre offered an official apology to the LGBTQ+ community for violence and discrimination perpetrated against the community by local police forces in the 1960s to 1990s. The 2017 edition of the parade was the largest in the city's history. In an event that attracted significant media attention, Prime Minister Justin Trudeau marched that year with Irish Taoiseach Leo Varadkar (the first openly gay Irish leader) and Vradkar's partner Matthew Barrett. The grand marshals for this special Montreal Pride edition included: John Banks, Janik Bastien Charlebois, Puelo Deir, Khloé Dubé, Florence Gagnon, Mona Greenbaum, Maïtée Labrecque-Saganash, Mado Lamotte, Fleurien Leth Graveson, Stuart Milk, Martine Roy, Bill Ryan, Jack Saddleback, Mark Singh, Chrissy Taylor and Mark Tewksbury.

== Montreal Pride 2018 ==
The 12th edition of the Montreal Pride festival ran from August 9 to 19, 2018. The parade was led by transgender women and their allies holding a sign which read “Trans women first, never again last.” The theme for the parade was the fifth color of the LGBTQ+ flag: blue. The grand marshals of the parade included Jacq Brasseur, Stonewall activist Miss Major Griffin-Gracy, US Olympic athlete Gus Kenworthy, Dominique Lavergne, Julie Lemieux, Kennedy Olango, and Dany Turcotte.

== Montreal Pride 2019 ==
The 13th edition of the Montreal Pride festival ran from August 8 to 18, 2019. The grand marshals of the festival included: LGBTQ+ activist and athlete Val Desjardins, advocate and M. Cuir Montréal 2011 Dany Godbout, author and activist Ma-Nee Chacaby, creator of the trans flag Monica Helms, actor and advocate Wilson Cruz and founder of Proud To Be Us Laos Anan Bouapha. The headliners for this edition included: Ciara, Margaret Cho, Ariane Moffatt, Steve Grand, 12 stars of RuPaul's Drag Race for the Drag Superstars show hosted by Sasha Velour with performances from Robin S and Janice Robinson. The theme for Montreal's 36th Pride Parade was the sixth color of the LGBTQ+ flag: violet.

Shortly prior to Montreal's Pride parade, LGBTQ activists supporting the 2019–20 Hong Kong protests, Action Free Hong Kong Montreal (Freehkmtl), were expelled from participating in the event for alleged security reasons. argued that their primary duty was ensuring public safety, asserting that complex international geopolitical conflicts should not be permitted to derail a local LGBTQ+ liberation event. To justify the last-minute exclusion, organizers stated to the media that law enforcement had alerted them to a specific sabotage risk. However, a subsequent CBC News investigation revealed that the Montreal Police Service (SPVM) publicly and explicitly denied issuing any such security warning or safety directive to the organization. The move was criticized as giving in to threats against the pro-Hong Kong activists from pro-Chinese Communist Party groups.

Following this disclosure, Freehkmtl representative Henry Lam, alongside civil rights advocates, accused Pride leadership of fabricating police warnings to protect corporate sponsorships, maintain a superficial image of political neutrality, and avoid public controversy.

== COVID era ==
In 2020, due to the COVID-19 pandemic in Canada, the traditional Fierté Montréal festival was cancelled; in its place, organizers presented a digital program of online events over the internet. The events included a special virtual edition of the annual Drag Superstars show, featuring prerecorded video performances by all of the competing queens from the first season of Canada's Drag Race. Competitor Rita Baga, known as Jean-François Guèvremont when not on stage, is Fierté Montréal's director of programming.

== Montreal Pride 2022 ==
=== Cancellation ===
In 2022, the planned parade was cancelled just a few hours before it was set to begin, with organizers blaming a lack of volunteer security staff due to COVID. Despite the cancellation of the official parade, however, over 1,000 attendees began their own impromptu march along the parade route.

== WorldPride 2023 ==
Montreal Pride submitted an application to the InterPride committee to host WorldPride in 2023; although the bid launched with heavy municipal backing, it was marred by multiple controversies, including the invitation of then-premier François Legault and the domestic censorship scandal in 2019. Just two months later, on October 20, 2019 in the delegate vote in Athens, Greece, delegates awarded the event to Sydney, Australia, in a 60% landslide vote. Media analysis noted that "the InterPride decision shows that if Fierté Montréal wants to play on the world stage, it needs to do a better job at home. It is easy to wave a flag and march down the street, but real inclusion takes work."

== Montreal Pride 2023 ==
In May 2023, Montreal Pride launched a comprehensive rebrand of its website and logo, meant to signal that the non-profit had moved on from the last-minute cancellation of the 2022 parade, which was cancelled due to a lack of organization. Montreal Pride has hired 200 additional employees with event planning experience to ensure the August 13 parade is well-organized and prepared for the 100,000 expected attendees.

As of 2023, Fierté Montréal also sponsors an award for the best LGBTQ-themed film screening at the annual Festival du nouveau cinéma.

== Montreal Pride 2025 ==
The 2025 edition of Fierté Montréal was marked by significant internal controversy and community division. In May 2025, over 15 local Sapphic event programmers and community leaders signed an open letter calling for major changes to Fierté Montréal's policies and staff. By mid-2025, approximately 20 queer groups publicly cut ties with Fierté Montréal, accusing the organization of fostering a toxic environment that excluded communities they claimed to support. These groups argued Fierté Montréal prioritized public image over genuine activism, favoring corporate interests over queer communities.

In response to the mass divestment from Fierté Montréal, organizers created Wild Pride, a grassroots alternative festival. The parade was held overlapping with Fierté Montréal.
