= Chaton (singer) =

French singer, musician and songwriter

- Born: August 27, 1983 (age 42); Lyon, France
- Other names: Siméo; Chaton; Petit Cœur
- Occupations: Singer; songwriter; musician
- Musical career
- Genres: Chanson; pop
- Years active: 2003–present
- Labels: Warner Chappell Music, Because Editions, Columbia, Columbia, Le Contenu
- Website: chaton-musique.com

Simon Cohen (born August 27, 1983), known professionally with the pseudonyms Siméo, Chaton, and Petit Cœur, is a French singer, songwriter, and musician.

== Biography ==
He was registered at the age of 6 at the conservatory where he had the right to touch a musical instrument from the age of 10 years. The piano is his first instrument, then follow guitar, bass, various brass, wood and percussion. He made his first compositions in several groups of amateur music during his adolescence and published his first album, Les idées bleues, in 2003, at the age of 20 years.

He traveled Europe with nearly 500 concerts alone on stage, assisted by his machines, between 2003 and 2009. In March and April 2009, he toured Asia (Simeo Asian Tour 2009) through 6 countries: Vietnam, Cambodia, Thailand, Brunei, Burma and Bangladesh. Then another in China in 2012.

In 2018, he released his fourth album, which earned him a critical recognition of the Inrocks. He is also noted for his resumption of a Celine Dion title written by Jean-Jacques Goldman, Pour que tu m'aimes encore.

== Discography ==
=== Studio albums ===
- Les Idées bleues (2003)
- Envie (2006)
- Sous un ciel trois étoiles (2009)
- Possible (2018)
- Brune Platine (2019)
- Princesse Pigalle (2019)
- Héros (2021)
- Vie (2021)
- Populaire (2021)
- Violent Beau (2022)
- Minute (2022)
- Le Geste (2022)
- Château Marcadet (2022)
- Palace (2023)

== Sources ==
- Chaudon, Marie-Valentine (July 24, 2007). "Les curieuses inventions d'un artisan du son. Simeo, chanteur" (in French). ISSN 0242-6056. Archived from the original on April 26, 2019.
- Pérez, Valentin (March 8, 2018). "La troisième vie de Chaton". Le Monde (in French). Archived from the original on April 26, 2019.
- Bordier, Julien (March 18, 2018). "Chaton, l'écouter, c'est l'adopter". L'Express (in French). Archived from the original on February 9, 2019.
- Tixier, Alice (July 10, 2018). "Chaton, la revanche d'un hypersensible". L'Obs. Archived from the original on April 26, 2019.
- Lecarpentier, Charline (March 12, 2018). "Chaton fait sa griffe". Libération (in French). Archived from the original on April 27, 2019.
