= Albin de la Simone =

French singer

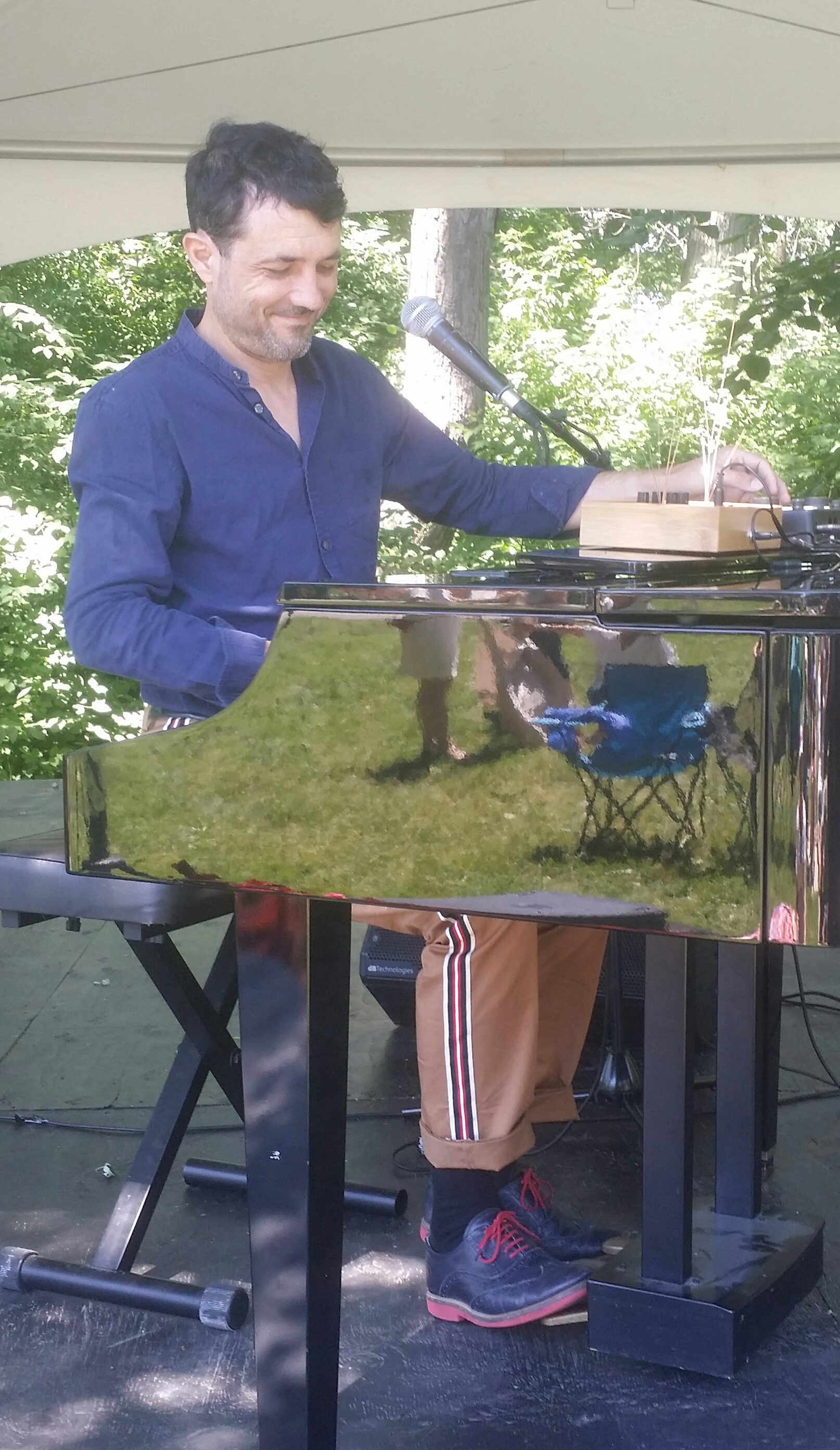
Albin de la Simone

Albin de la Simone (born in Amiens, Picardy, France on 14 December 1970) is a French singer-songwriter.

He has released five albums since 2003, being nominated to the 2018 Victoires de la Musique in the Best Song Album (Meilleur album de chansons) category and in 2014 in the Best Live Newcomers (Révélation scène) category.

He has been working in music since the mid-1990s as a keyboardist, bassist, arranger, and director for a large number of artists, including Miossec, Vanessa Paradis, Keren Ann, Arthur H, Alain Souchon, Raphaël Haroche, Mathieu Boogaerts, Jean-Louis Aubert, and Salif Keita, among others (complete discography below).

As an artist, his musical works are exhibited at Les Francofolies de La Rochelle, Philharmonie de Paris, and many other galleries and festivals.

He is also associated with the Théâtre National de Bretagne.

== Career ==
=== Startings ===
After studying art at the Institut Saint-Luc in Tournai (Belgium) and arrangement and orchestration at the Centre d'informations musicales (CIM) in Paris, Albin L'Eleu de la Simone started his career as composer and jazz pianist (his father being a New Orleans Jazz clarinetist) as a member of the band "The Barbecues."

In 1995, he and his quintet were finalists in La_Défense_Jazz_Festival.

Between 1995 and 2000, he toured in Africa with Salif Keita and Angélique Kidjo, and he began to feature on other French singers' tracks.

Parallelly, de la Simone met the new singers of his generation (Mathieu Boogaerts, Matthieu Chedid, Arthur H, Nina Morato...) and found his calling. He wrote his first songs towards the end of the 1990s.

=== 2003–2004: First album ===
In 2003, de la Simone performed his first concerts as singer in Japan, opening for Mathieu Boogaerts.

In September, he released Albin de la Simone, his first album, on the label Virgin Records, co-directed with Renaud Letang. Of the album, "Elle aime", sung as a duet with Feist, and "Patricia," with Alain Souchon, became hits.

He composed in part the soundtrack of the film Tiresia, directed by Bertrand Bonello.

== Discography ==
=== Albums ===
Year	Album	Peak positions	
Year	Album	FRA	BEL (WA)
2003	Albin de la Simone	—	—
2005	Je vais changer	154	—
2008	Bungalow!	155	—
2013	Un homme	55	68
2017	L'un de nous	50	18
2021	Happy end (Bo du film)	—	—
2023	Les cents prochaines années	—	86
2025	La vie de château - Mon enfance à Versailles (BO du film)	—	—
2025	Toi là-bas (encore)	—	—
2025	Toi là-bas (encore)	—	—

== Decorations ==
- Chevalier of the Order of Arts and Letters (2015)
