= Flavien Berger =

French musician

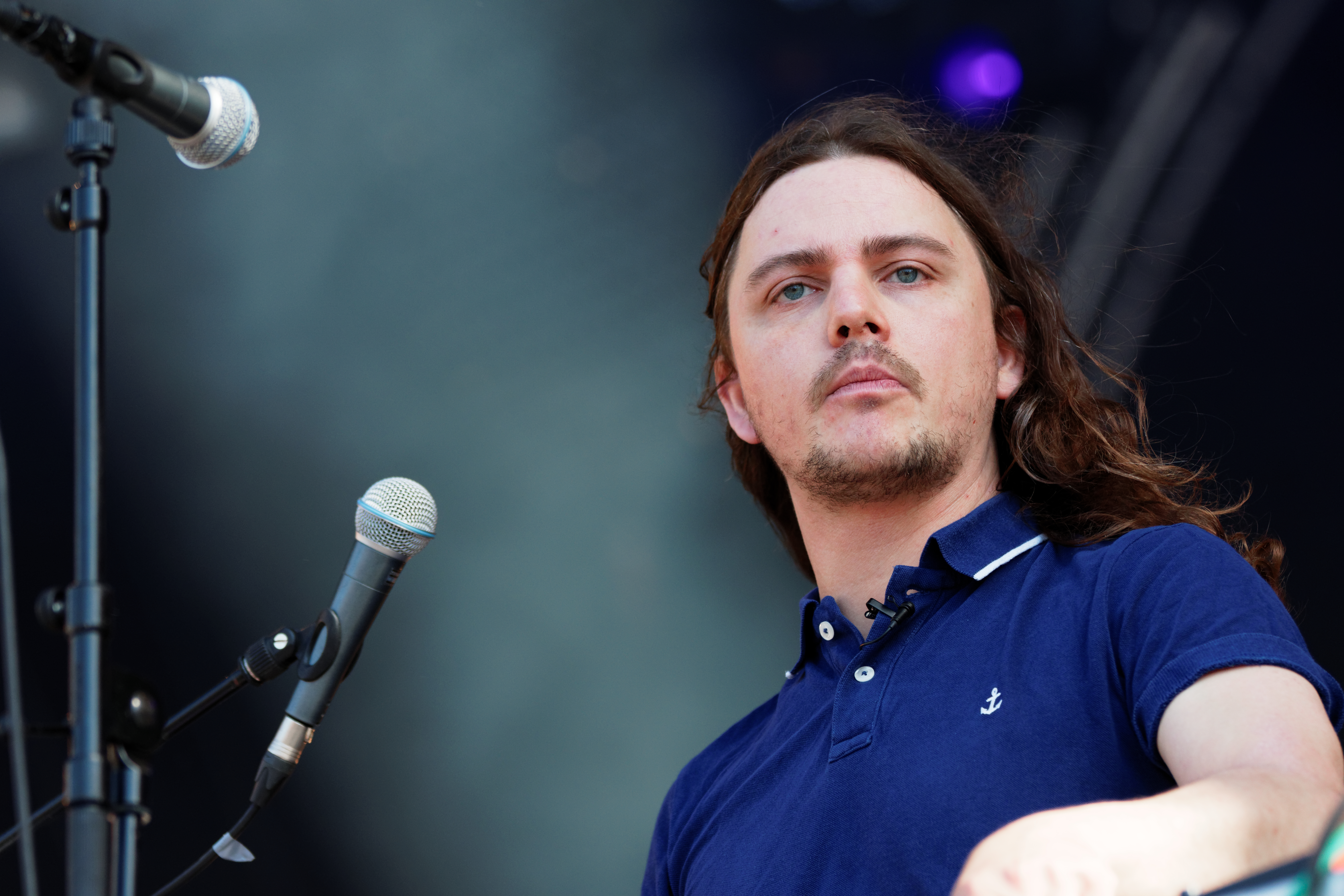
- Flavien Berger performing at the Vieilles Charrues Festival in 2016.

Background information
- Born: 2 July 1986 (age 39); Paris, France
- Occupations: Musician, singer-songwriter
- Years active: Since 2014
- Labels: Pan European Recording

Flavien Berger (born 2 July 1986, in Paris) is a French singer-songwriter. A hybrid artist blending electro and psychedelia, Berger discovered music composition on his PlayStation 2 with the game Music 2000.

Berger pursued sound design at the ENSCI – Les Ateliers. He began his first experiments with other art students, who later formed the collective Sin and then moved to Brussels. Together, they produced installations, video projects for which Flavien composed the original scores.

He released his debut album, Léviathan, in 2015. In 2018, he released his second album, Contre-Temps. The album was recorded in 2017 in Normandy, under the influence of the landscapes and the temporality of the place.

== Discography ==
=== Albums ===
- Léviathan (2015)
- Contre-Temps (2018)
- Dans cent ans (2023)

=== Singles ===
- "La Fête Noire" (2018)
- "Maddy La Nuit" (2019)
